= Hubert Robert =

French painter (1733–1808)

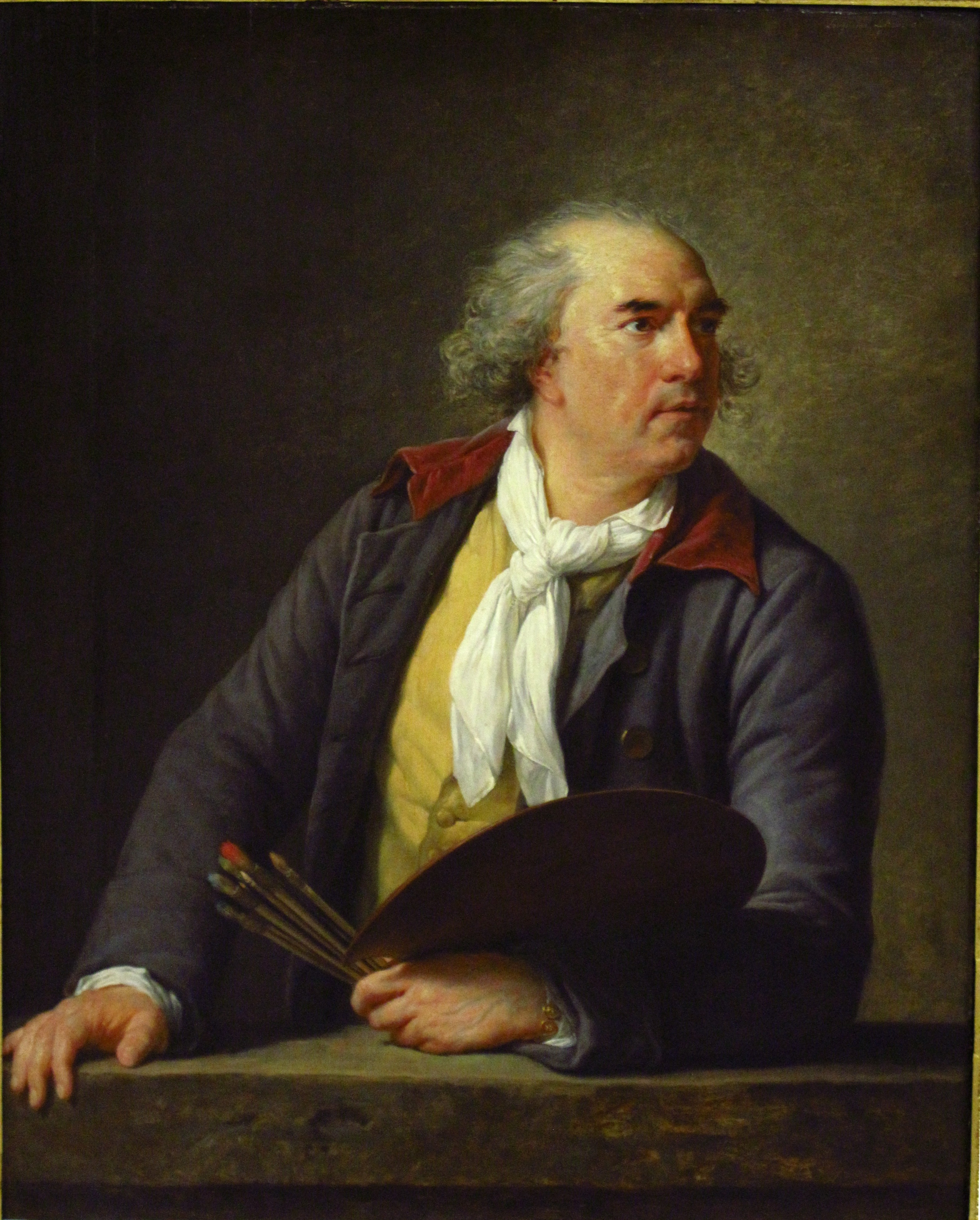
- Portrait of Hubert Robert by Élisabeth Vigée-Lebrun, 1788
- Born: 22 May 1733; Paris, France
- Died: 15 April 1808 (aged 74); Paris, France

Signature
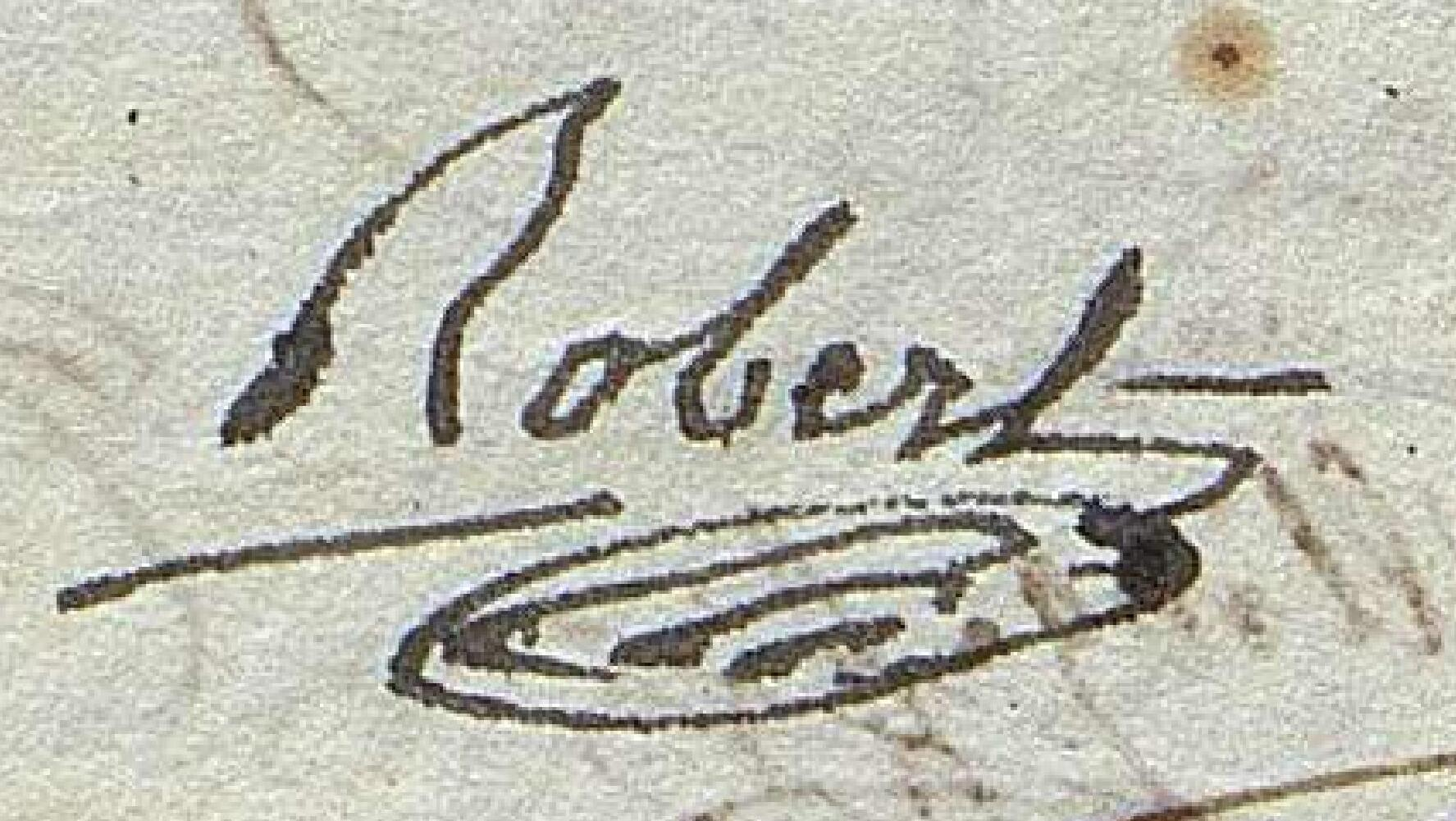

Hubert Robert (French pronunciation: [ybɛʁ ʁɔbɛʁ]; 22 May 1733 – 15 April 1808) was a French painter in the school of Romanticism, noted especially for his landscape paintings and capricci, or semi-fictitious picturesque depictions of ruins in Italy and of France.

== Biography ==
=== Early years ===
Hubert Robert was born in Paris in 1733. His father, Nicolas Robert, was in the service of François-Joseph de Choiseul, marquis de Stainville, a leading diplomat from Lorraine. Young Robert finished his studies with the Jesuits at the Collège de Navarre in 1751 and entered the atelier of the sculptor Michel-Ange Slodtz who taught him design and perspective but encouraged him to turn to painting. In 1754 he left for Rome in the train of Étienne-François de Choiseul, son of his father's employer, who had been named French ambassador and would become a Secretary of State for Foreign Affairs to Louis XV in 1758.

=== In Rome ===
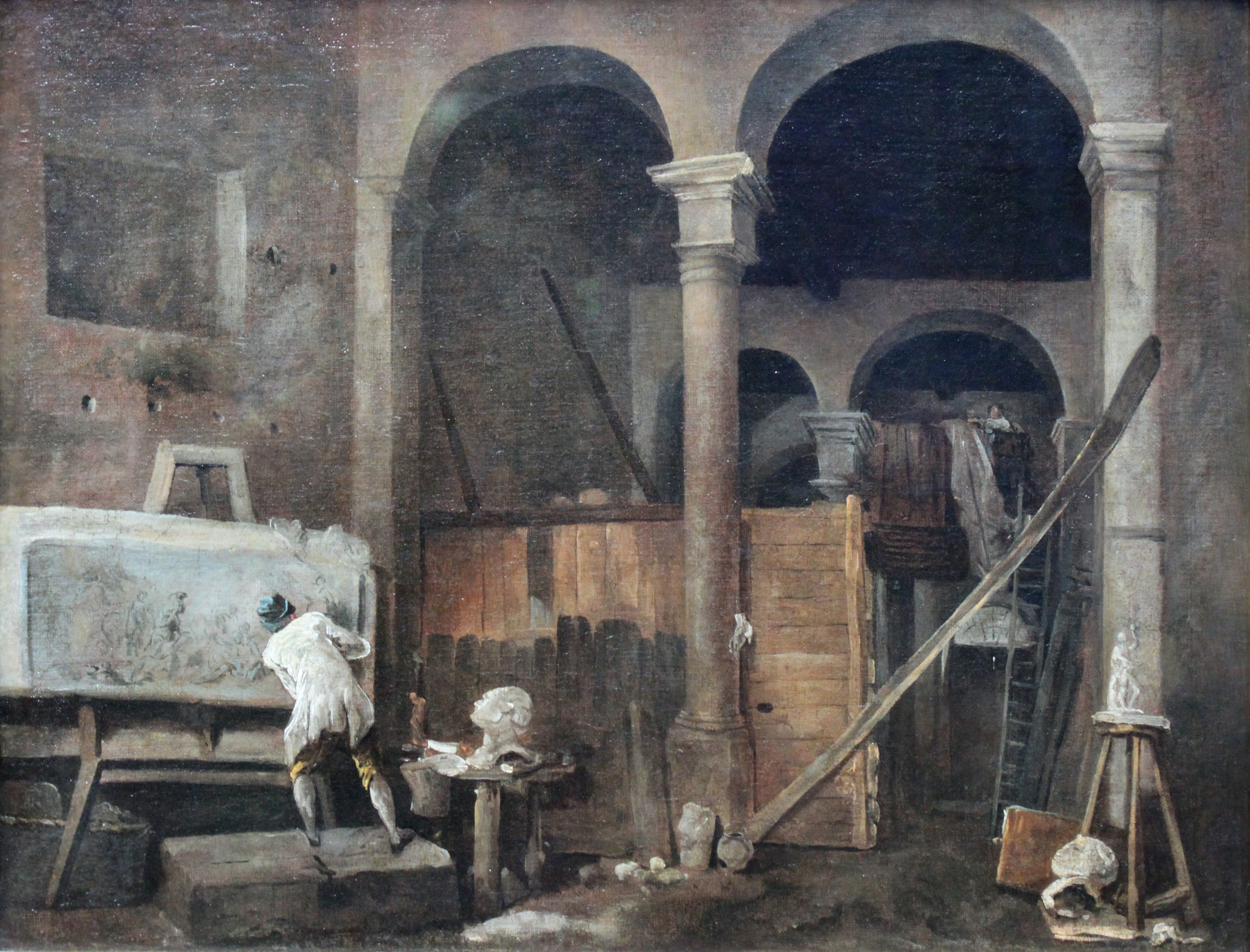
The Artist's Studio, 1760, Städelsches Kunstinstitut

He spent fully eleven years in Rome, a remarkable length of time; after the young artist's official residence at the French Academy in Rome ran out, he supported himself by works he produced for visiting connoisseurs like the abbé de Saint-Non, who took Robert to Naples in April 1760 to visit the ruins of Pompeii. The marquis de Marigny, director of the Bâtiments du Roi kept abreast of his development in correspondence with Natoire, director of the French Academy, who urged the pensionnaires to sketch out-of-doors, from nature: Robert needed no urging; drawings from his sketchbooks document his travels: Villa d'Este, Caprarola.

The contrast between the ruins of ancient Rome and the life of his time excited his keenest interest. He worked for a time in the studio of Giovanni Paolo Panini, whose influence can be seen in the Vue imaginaire de la galerie du Louvre en ruine (illustration) and in the capriccio A View of Ripetta. Robert spent his time in the company of young artists in the circle of Piranesi, whose capricci of romantically overgrown ruins influenced him so greatly that he gained the nickname Robert des ruines. The albums of sketches and drawings he assembled in Rome supplied him with motifs that he worked into paintings throughout his career.

He is reported to have carved his name into the walls of the Colosseum in 1767.

=== In Paris ===
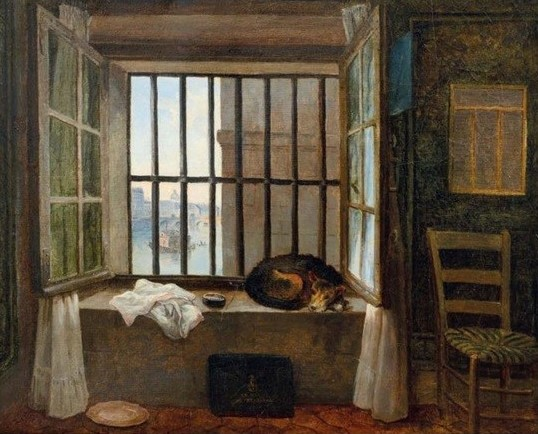
Vue de la cellule du Baron de Besenval à la prison du Châtelet (1789). Formerly the baron's collection at the Hôtel de Besenval.

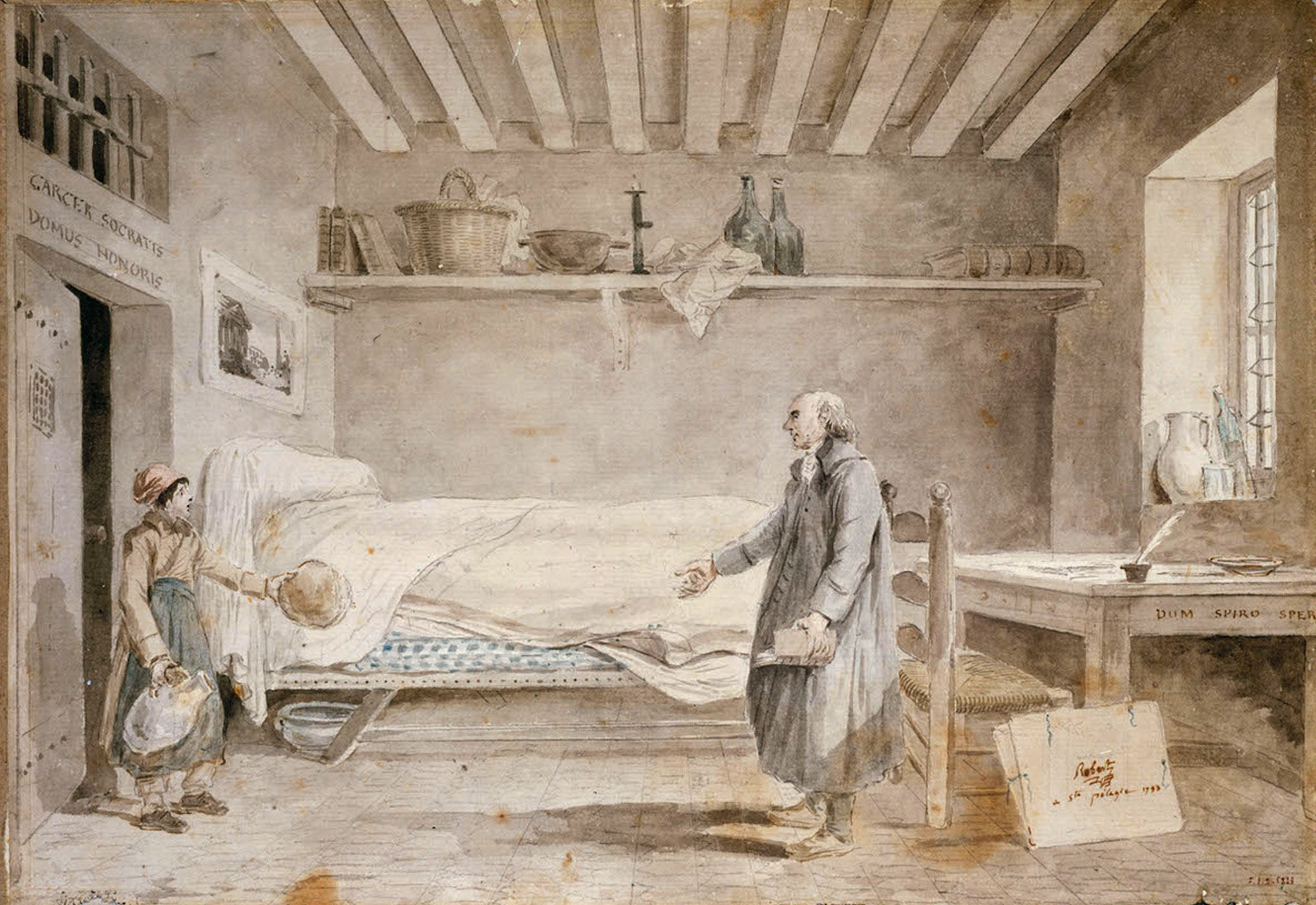
The Artist in His Cell (1793), ink, wash, watercolor, and chalk, 22.7 x 32.7 cm., Musée Carnavalet

His success on his return to Paris in 1765 was rapid: the following year he was received by the Académie royale de peinture et de sculpture, with a Roman capriccio, The Port of Rome, ornamented with different Monuments of Architecture, Ancient and Modern. Robert's first exhibition at the Salon of 1767, consisting of thirteen paintings and a number of drawings, prompted Denis Diderot to write: "The ideas which the ruins awake in me are grand." Robert subsequently showed work at every Salon until 1802. He was successively appointed "Designer of the King's Gardens", "Keeper of the King's Pictures" and "Keeper of the Museum and Councilor to the Academy".

Robert was arrested in October 1793, during the French Revolution. During the ten months of his detention at Sainte-Pélagie and Saint-Lazare he made many drawings, painted at least 53 canvases, and painted numerous vignettes of prison life on plates. He was freed one week after the fall of Robespierre. Robert narrowly escaped the guillotine when through error another prisoner with a similar name was guillotined in his place.

Subsequently, he was placed on the committee of five in charge of the new national museum at the Palais du Louvre.

The Revolution also resulted in the destruction of some of Robert's work; his painting Péché Cardinal (ca.1799) is one that is thought to be lost or destroyed in a fire. Robert had designed the decorations for a little theatre in the new wing at the location of the current staircase Gabriel in the Palace of Versailles. Designed to seat about 500, this theatre was built from the summer of 1785 and opened in early 1786. It was intended to serve as an ordinary court theatre, replacing the Theatre of the Princes Court which was too old and too small, but was destroyed during the time of Louis Philippe I. A watercolour of Robert's design is in the National Archives in Paris.

Robert died of a stroke on 15 April 1808.

== Style and legacy ==
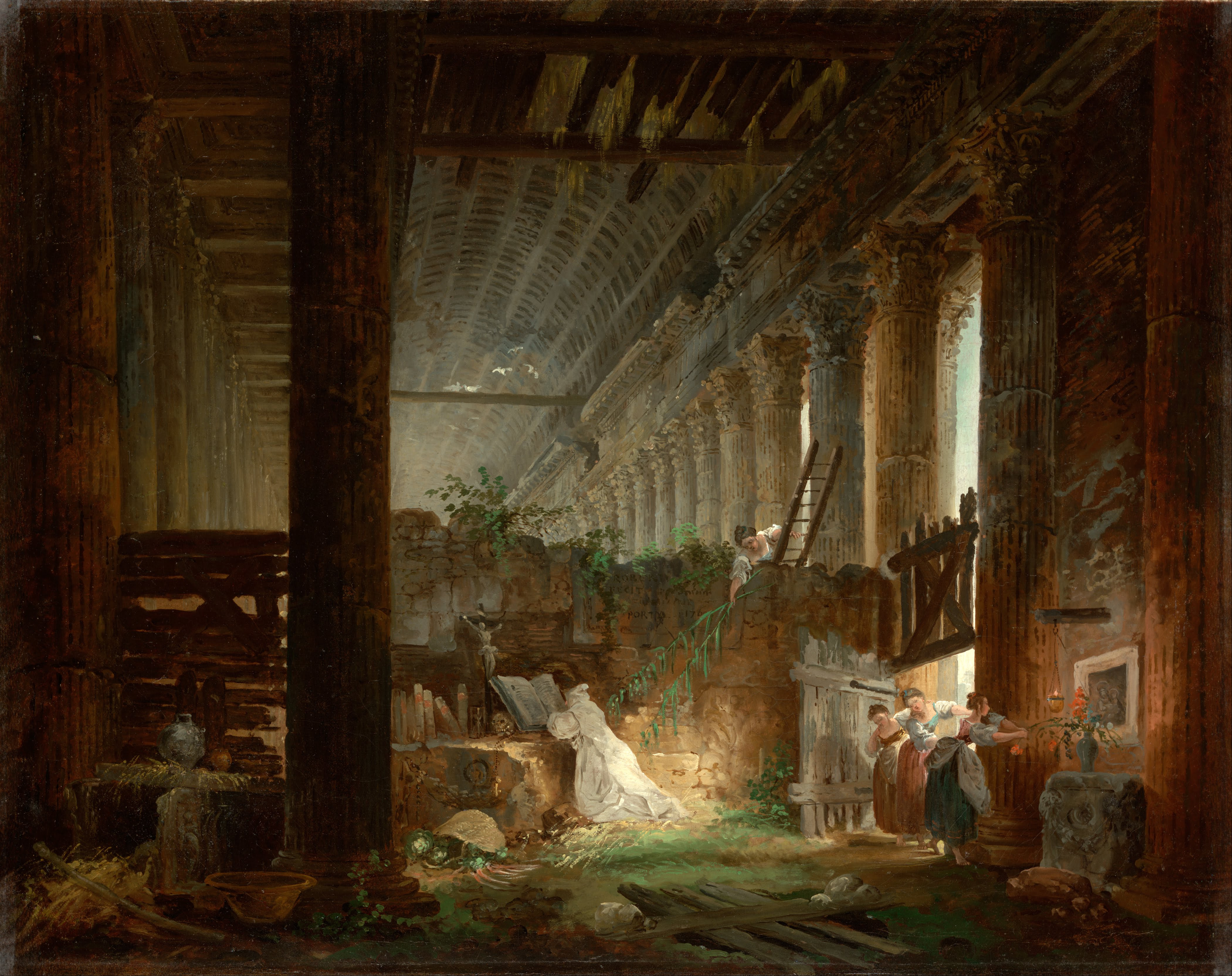
A Hermit Praying in the Ruins of a Roman Temple

The quantity of his work is immense, comprising perhaps one thousand paintings and ten thousand drawings. The Louvre alone contains nine paintings by his hand and specimens are frequently to be met with in provincial museums and private collections. Robert's work has more or less of that scenic character which justified his selection by Voltaire to paint the decorations of his theatre at Ferney.

In 2016, the Louvre and the National Gallery of Art presented Hubert Robert, 1733–1808: A Visionary Painter, a retrospective surveying his work as both a painter and draftsman.

His work was much engraved by the abbé de Saint-Non, with whom he had visited Naples in the company of Fragonard during his early days; in Italy his work has also been frequently reproduced by Chatelain, Linard, Le Veau, and others.

He is noted for the liveliness and point with which he treated the subjects he painted. Equally at ease painting small easel pictures or huge decorations, he worked quickly using an alla prima technique. Along with this incessant activity as an artist, his daring character and many adventures attracted general admiration and sympathy. In the fourth canto of his L'Imagination Jacques Delille celebrated Robert's miraculous escape when lost in the catacombs.

=== Robert and picturesque gardens ===
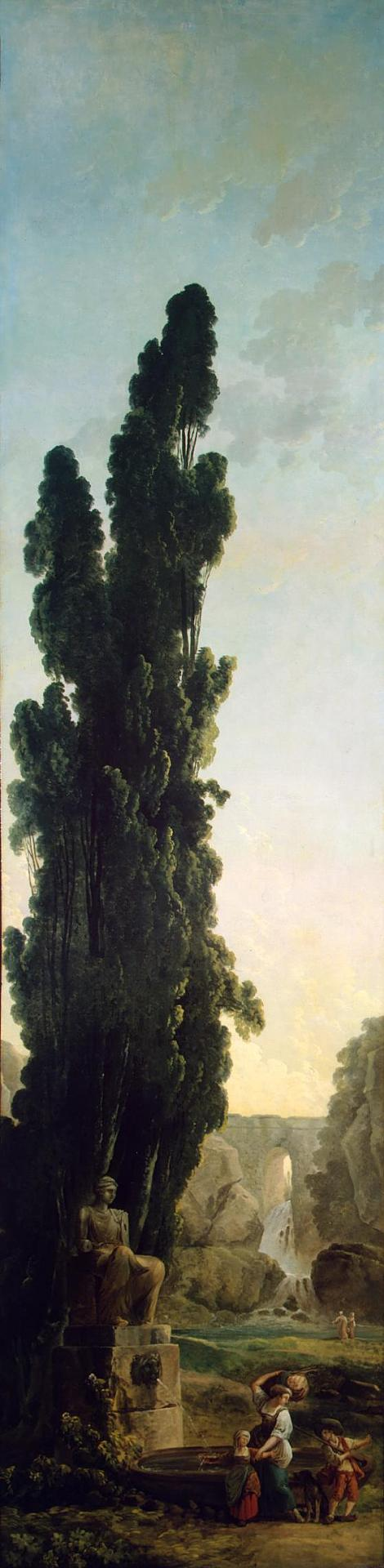
Cypresses (1773), 300 x 75 cm., Hermitage

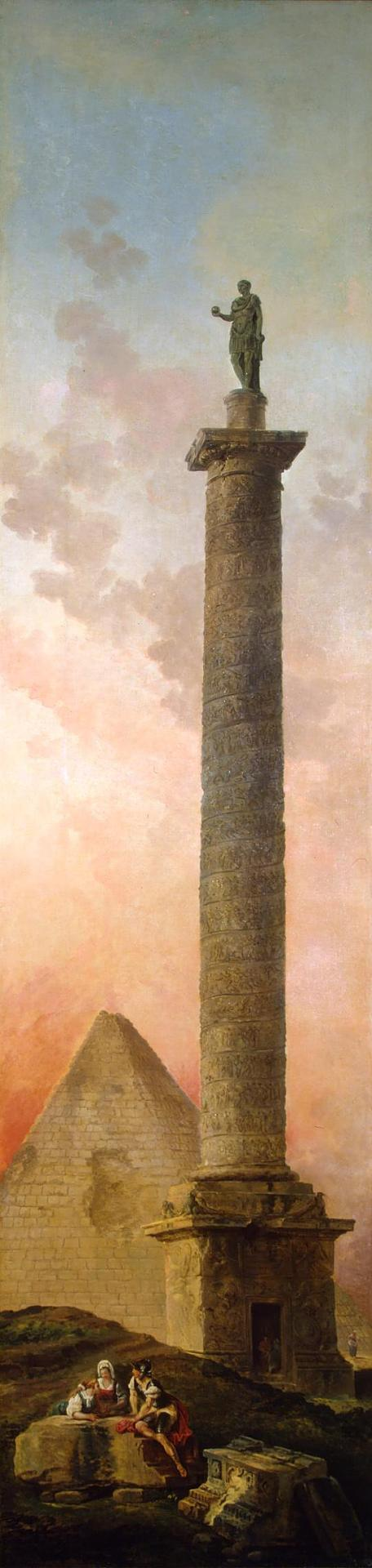
Triumphal Column (1773), 300 x 74 cm., Hermitage

Enterprising and prolific, Robert also acted in a role similar to that of a modern-day art director, conceptualizing fashionably dilapidated gardens for several aristocratic clients, summarized by his possible intervention at Ermenonville; there he would have been working with the architect Jean-Marie Morel for the marquis de Girardin, who was the author of Compositions des paysages (1777) and had distinct views of his own. In 1786 he began his better documented collaboration at Méréville, with his most significant patron, the financier Jean-Joseph de Laborde, who found François-Joseph Bélanger's plans too expensive and perhaps too formal.

Though documents are again lacking, Hubert Robert's name is invariably invoked in connection with Marie Antoinette's 'premier architecte' Richard Mique through several phases of the creation of an informal landscape garden at the Petit Trianon, and the setting of the petit hameau. Robert's contribution to garden design was not in making practical ground plans for improvements but in providing atmospheric inspiration for the proposed effect. At Ermenonville and at Méréville "Hubert Robert's paintings both recorded and inspired", according to W.H. Adams: Robert's four large ruin fantasies, painted in 1787 for Méréville may be searched in vain for direct connections with the garden. Hubert's paintings of the Moulin Joly of his friend Claude-Henri Watelet render the fully-grown atmosphere of a garden that had been under way since 1754. His set of six Italianate landscape panels painted for Bagatelle were not the inspiration for the formal turfed parterre set in the thinned woodlands, designed by Bélanger; the later picturesque extensions of Bagatelle were carried out by its Scottish gardener, William Blaikie. Robert's commissioned painting of the long-delayed rejuvenation of the park at Versailles, begun in 1774 with the cutting down of the trees for sale as firewood, is a record of the event, resonant with allegorical meaning. Robert was more certainly responsible for the conception of the grotto and cascades of the 'Baths of Apollo,' tucked within a grove of the château's park and built to house François Girardon's celebrated sculpture group Apollo Attended by Nymphs.

== Gallery ==
=== Works on paper ===
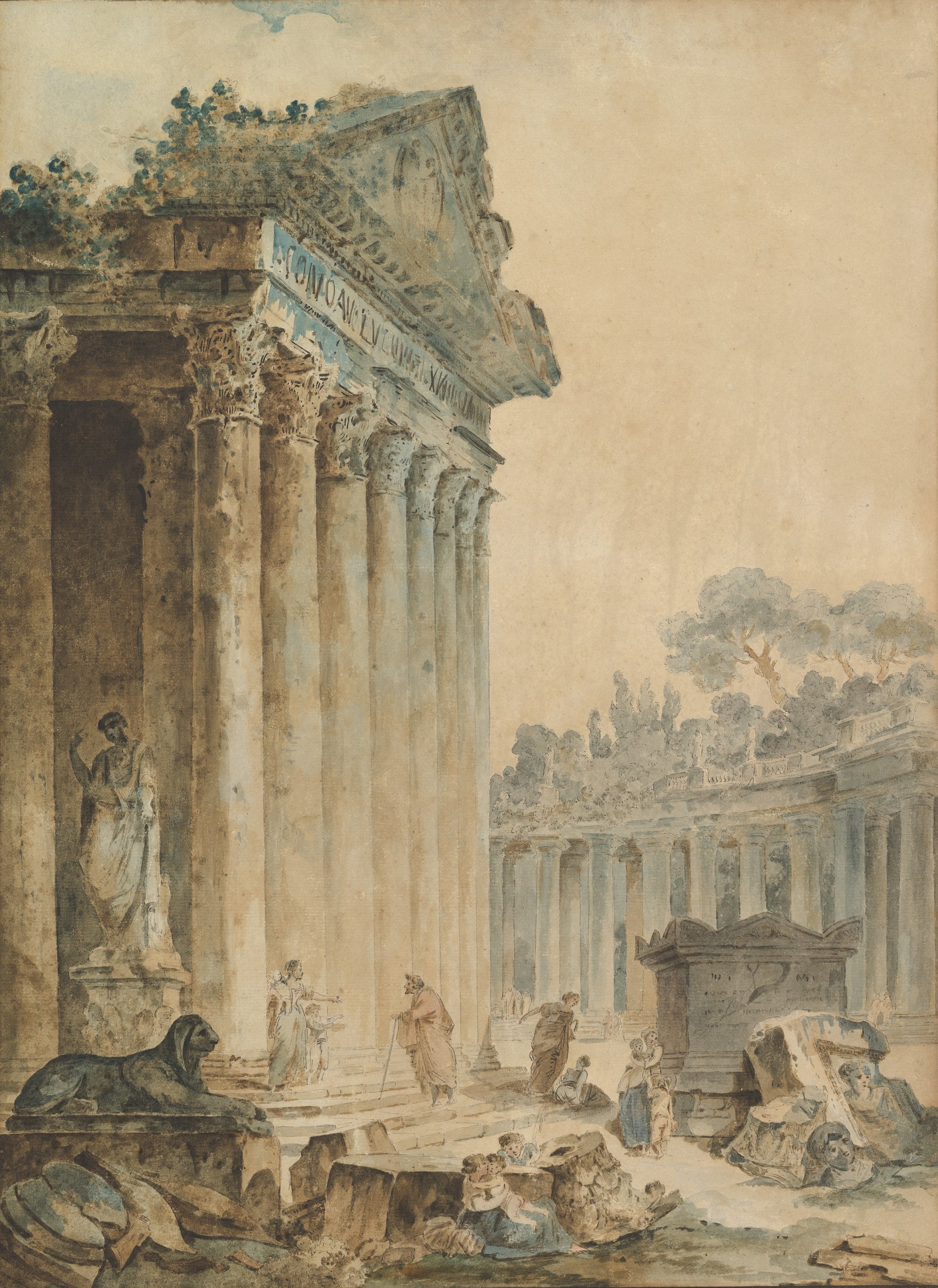
Capriccio (ca. 1756), watercolor, 56.4 x 41.3 cm., Metropolitan Museum of Art

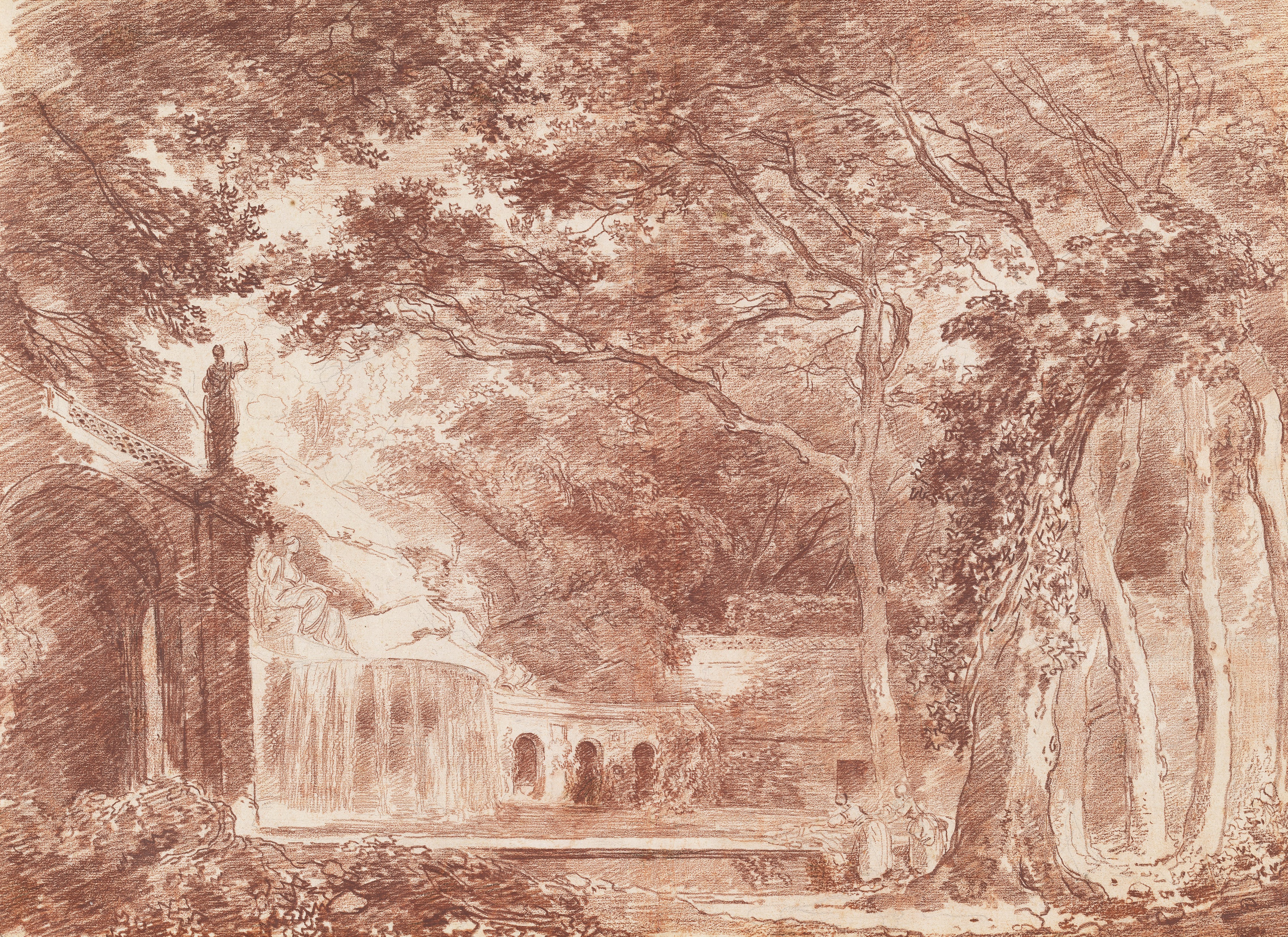
Oval Fountain in the Villa d'Este Gardens, Tivoli (1760), 32.7 x 45 cm., National Gallery of Art

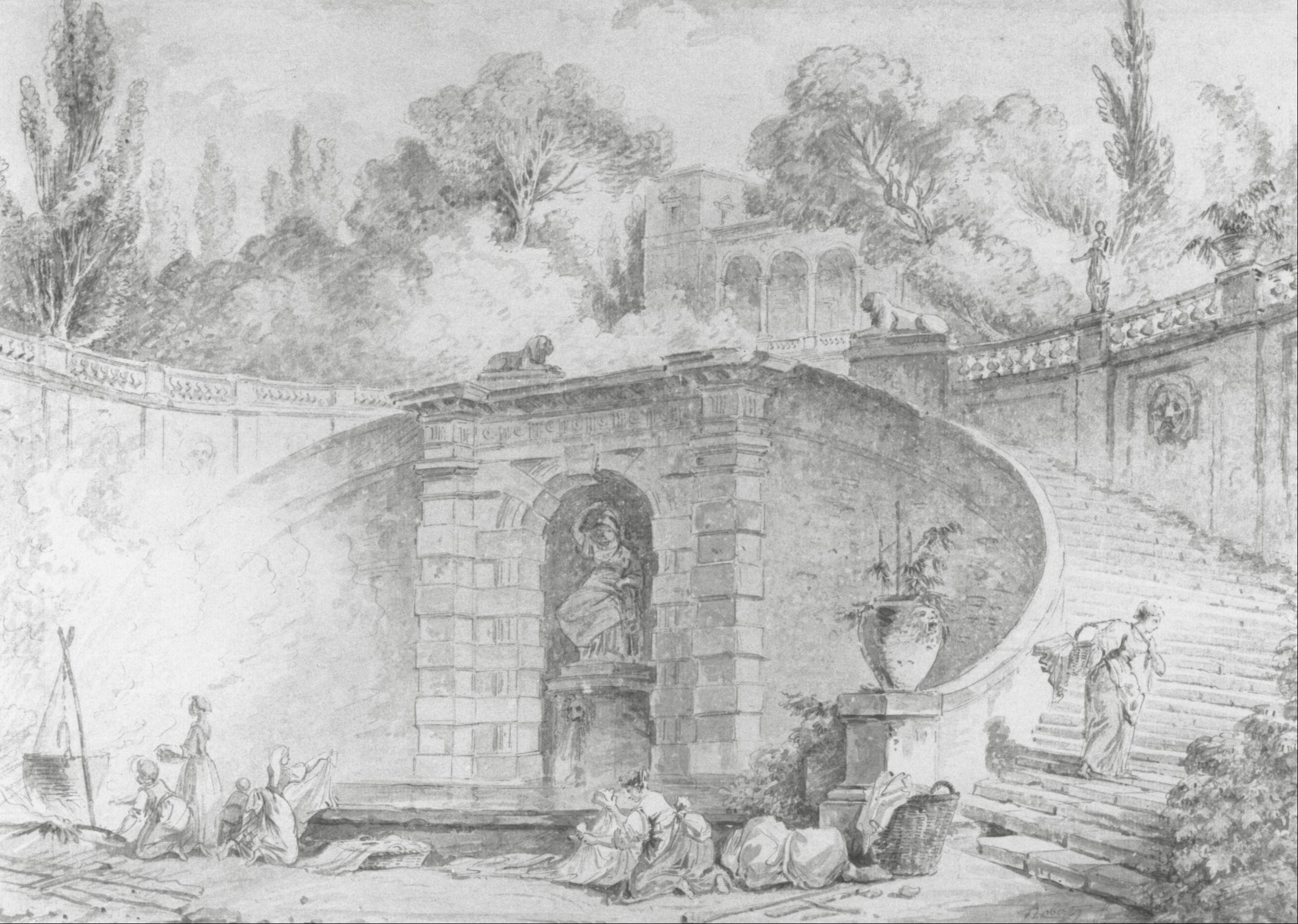
The Large Staircase (ca. 1761–65), 45 x 32.3 cm., Pen and ink, wash, watercolor, and chalk, Museum of Fine Arts, Houston

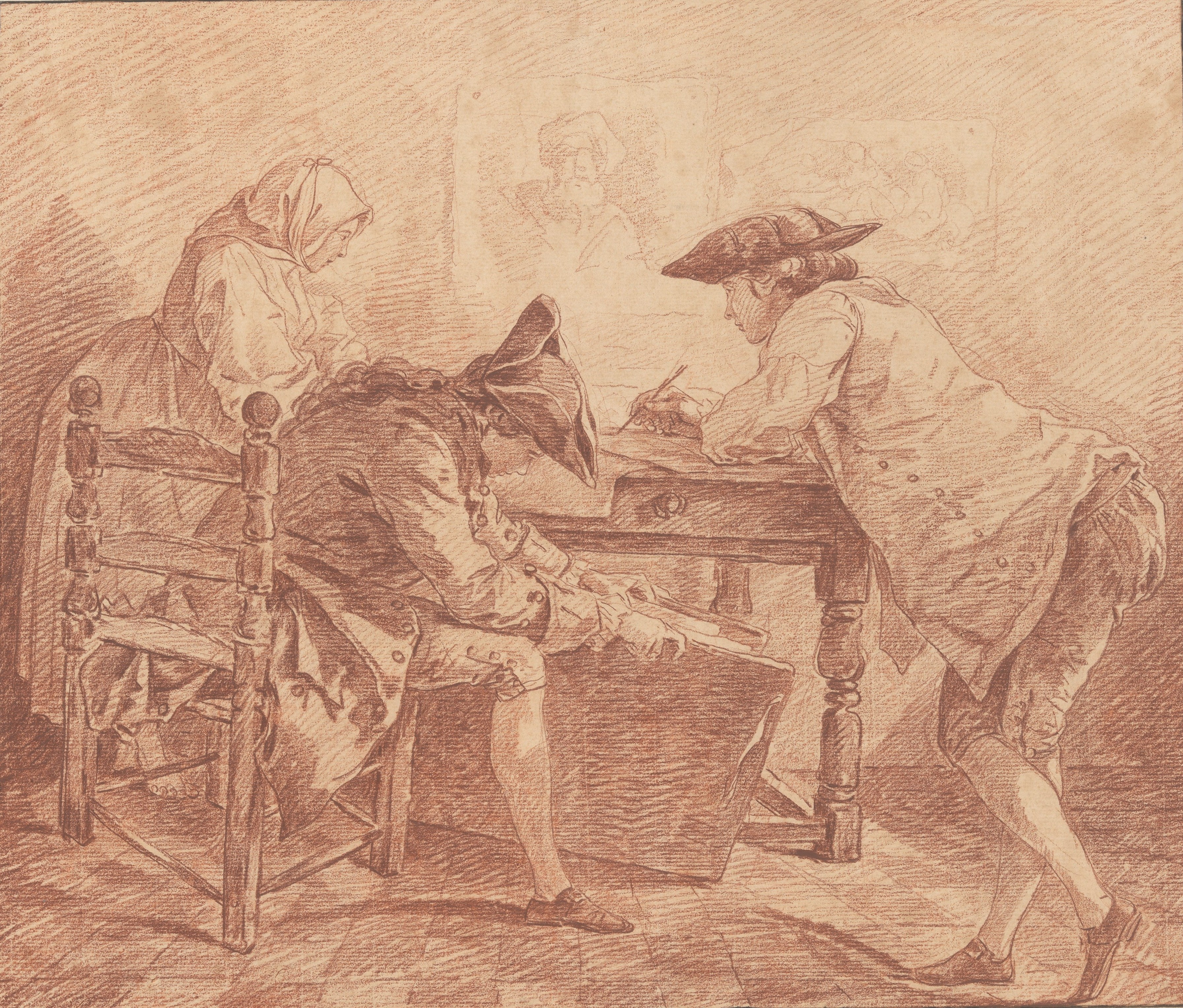
Young Artists in the Studio (ca.1763-65), red chalk, 35.2 x 41.2 cm., Metropolitan Museum of Art

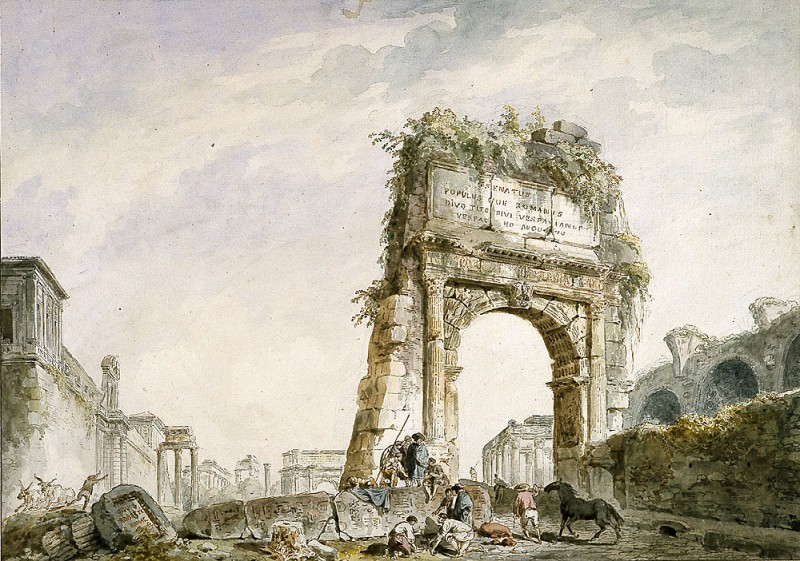
Arch of Titus in Rome (1760s), watercolor, 35 x 49.5 cm., Czartoryski Museum

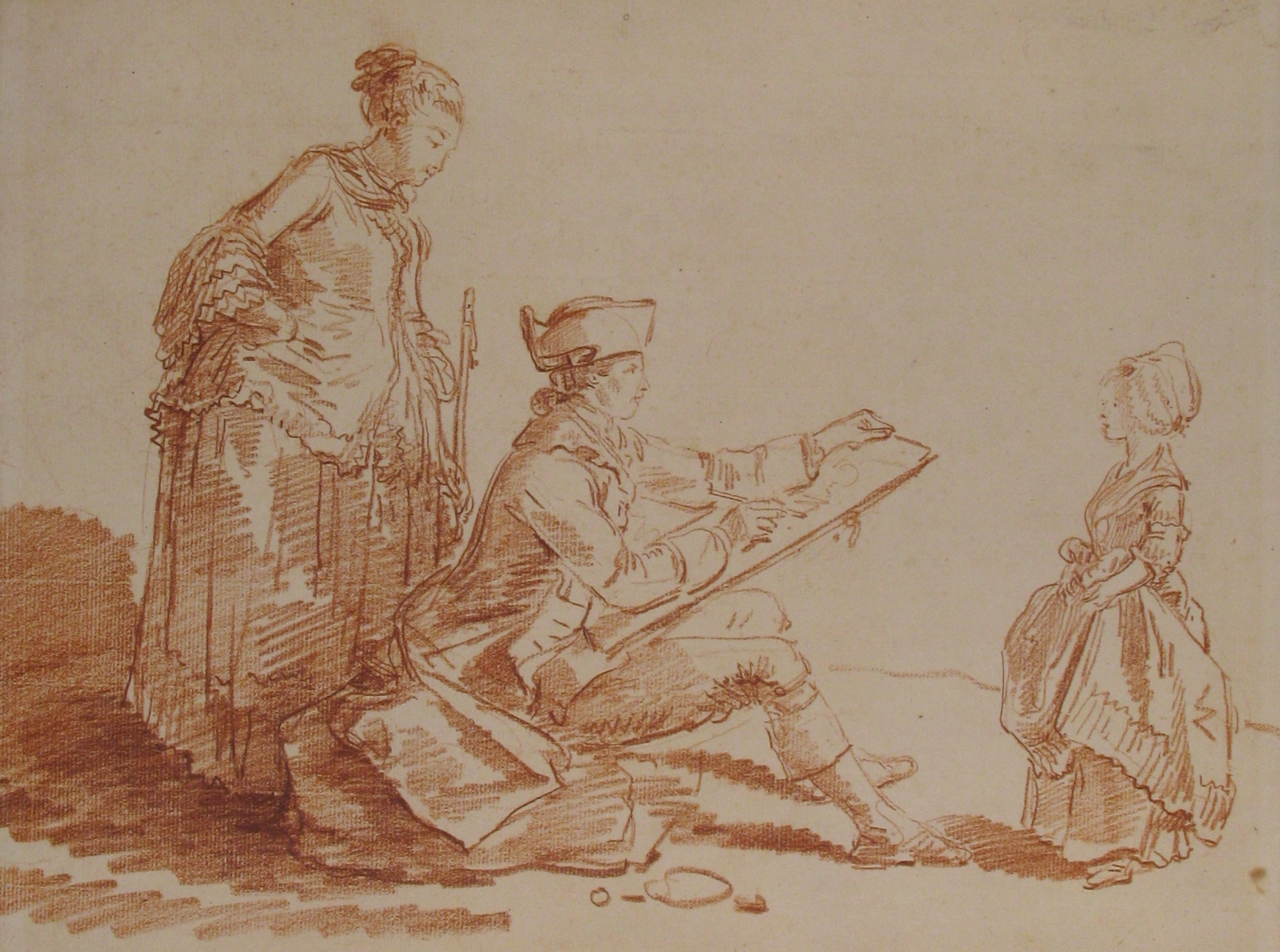
Artist Sketching a Young Girl (ca. 1773), red chalk, 25.5 x 33.8 cm., Metropolitan Museum of Art

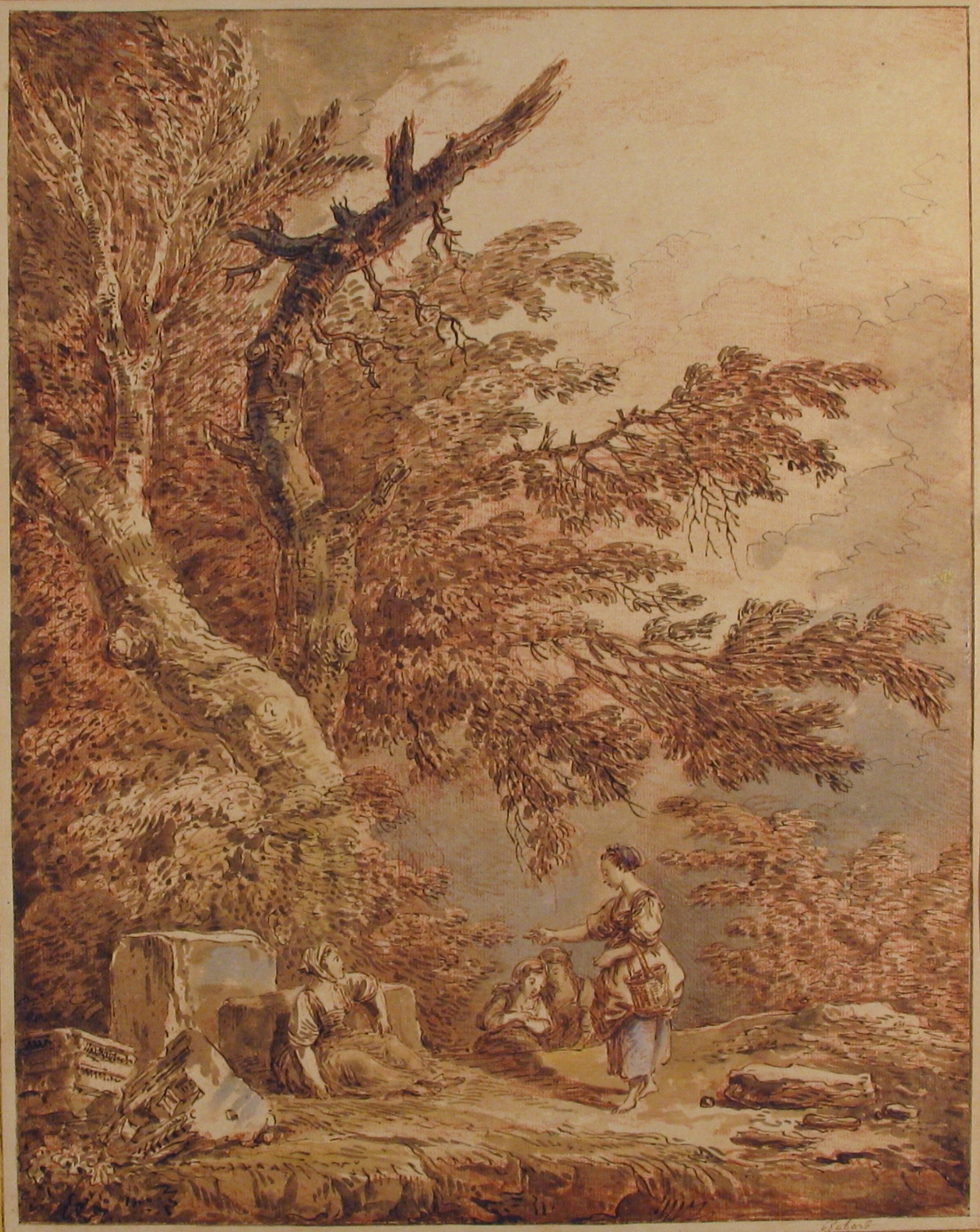
Women in Landscape (ca. 1773), ink, wash, & chalk, 36.6 x 28.7 cm., Metropolitan Museum of Art

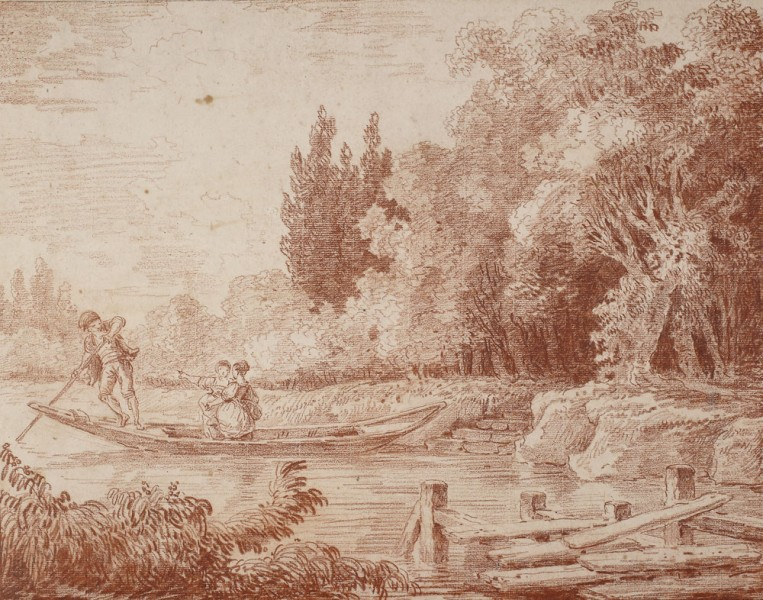
Boat Journey (1774), sanguine, 28.9 x 36.5 cm., National Museum in Warsaw

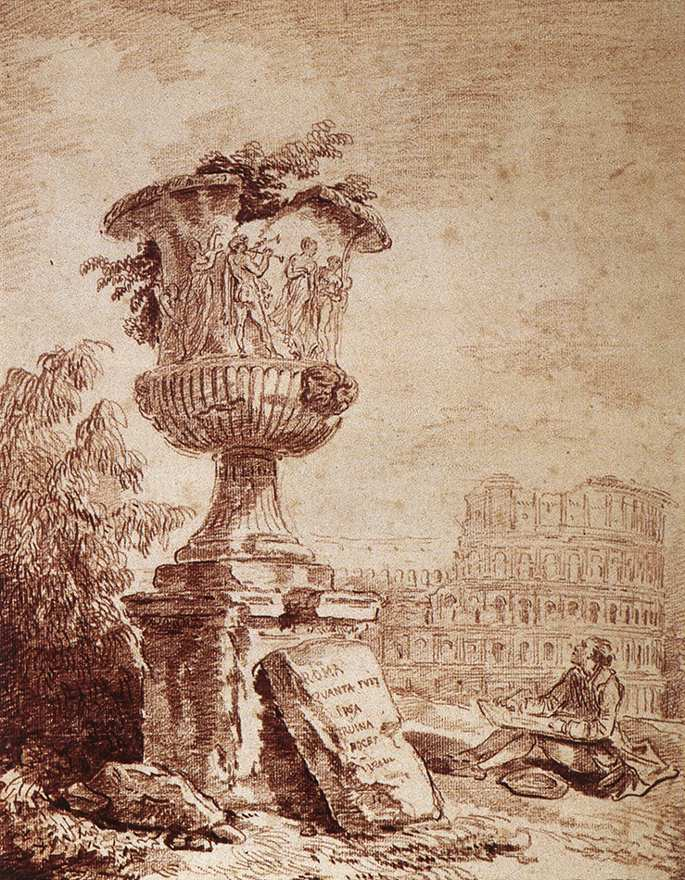
Draughtsman of the Borghese Vase (ca. 1775), chalk, 36.5 x 29 cm., Museu de Belles Arts de València

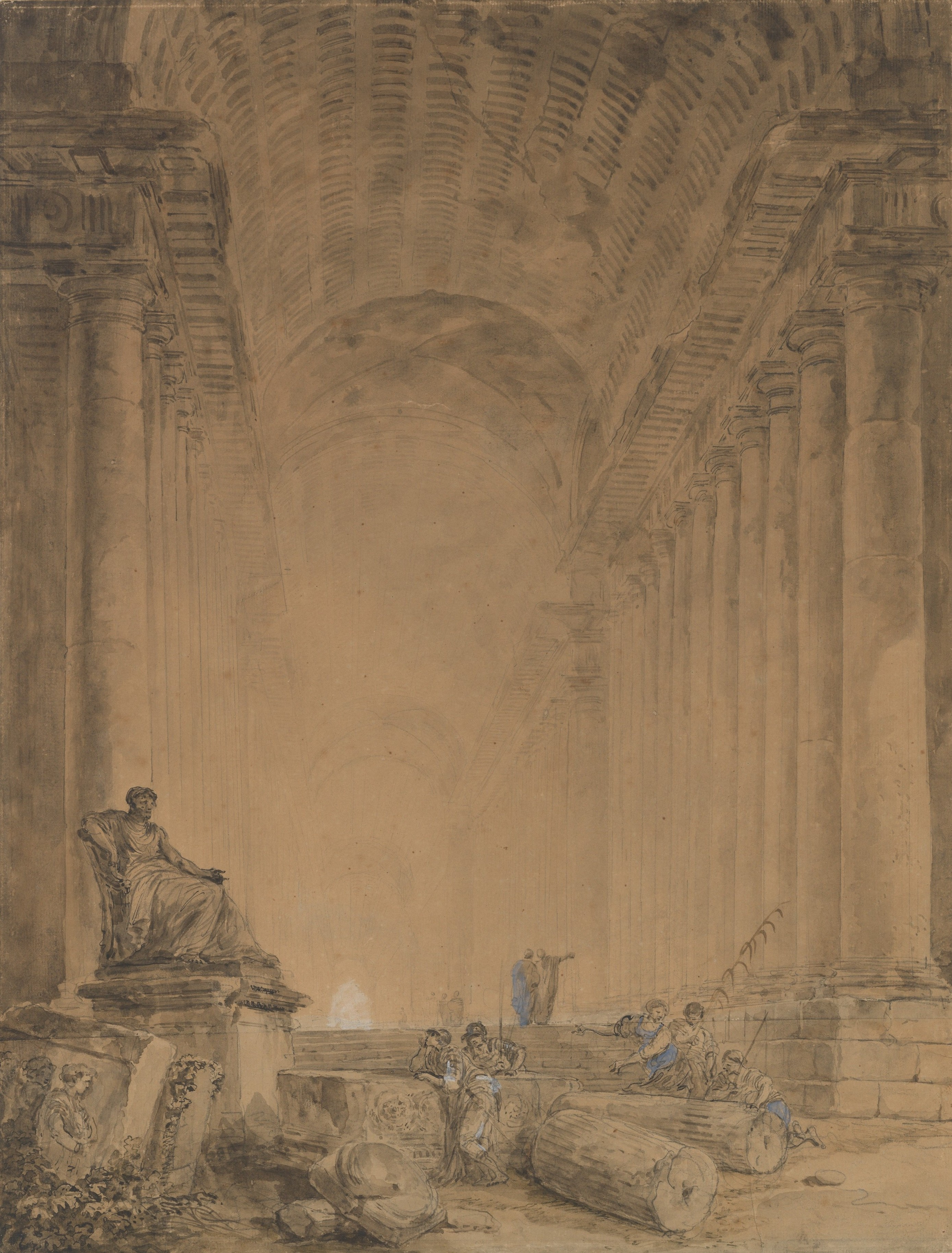
Figures in a Colonnade (ca. 1780), ink, wash, & chalk, 58.6 x 44 .7 cm., Metropolitan Museum of Art

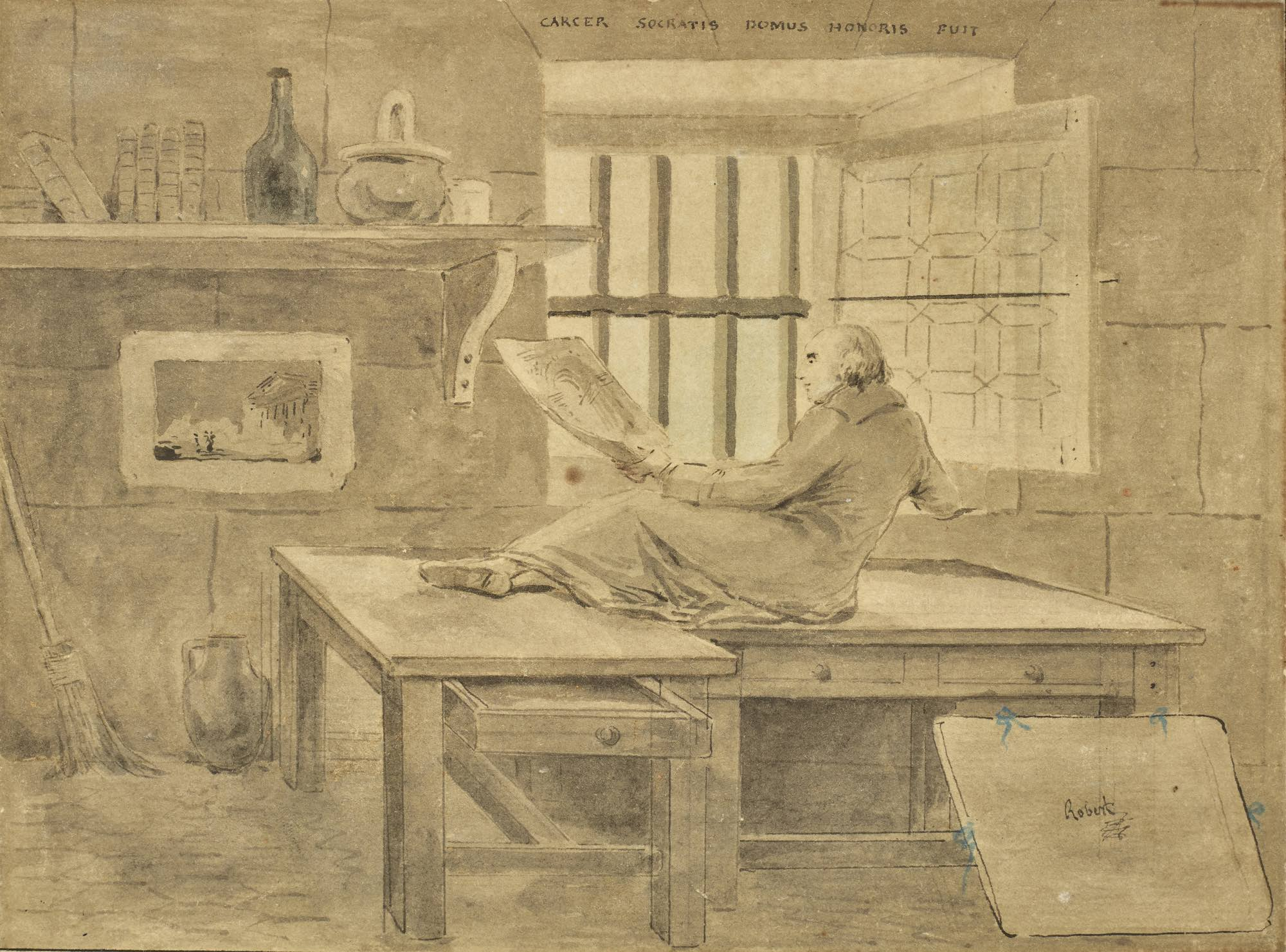
Self Portrait in Prison (ca 1793–94), ink, wash, watercolor and chalk, 17.6 x 23.8 cm., Galerie Coatalem

=== Oil paintings ===
Stairway of Farnese Palace Park , 217x149 cm., National Museum of Serbia

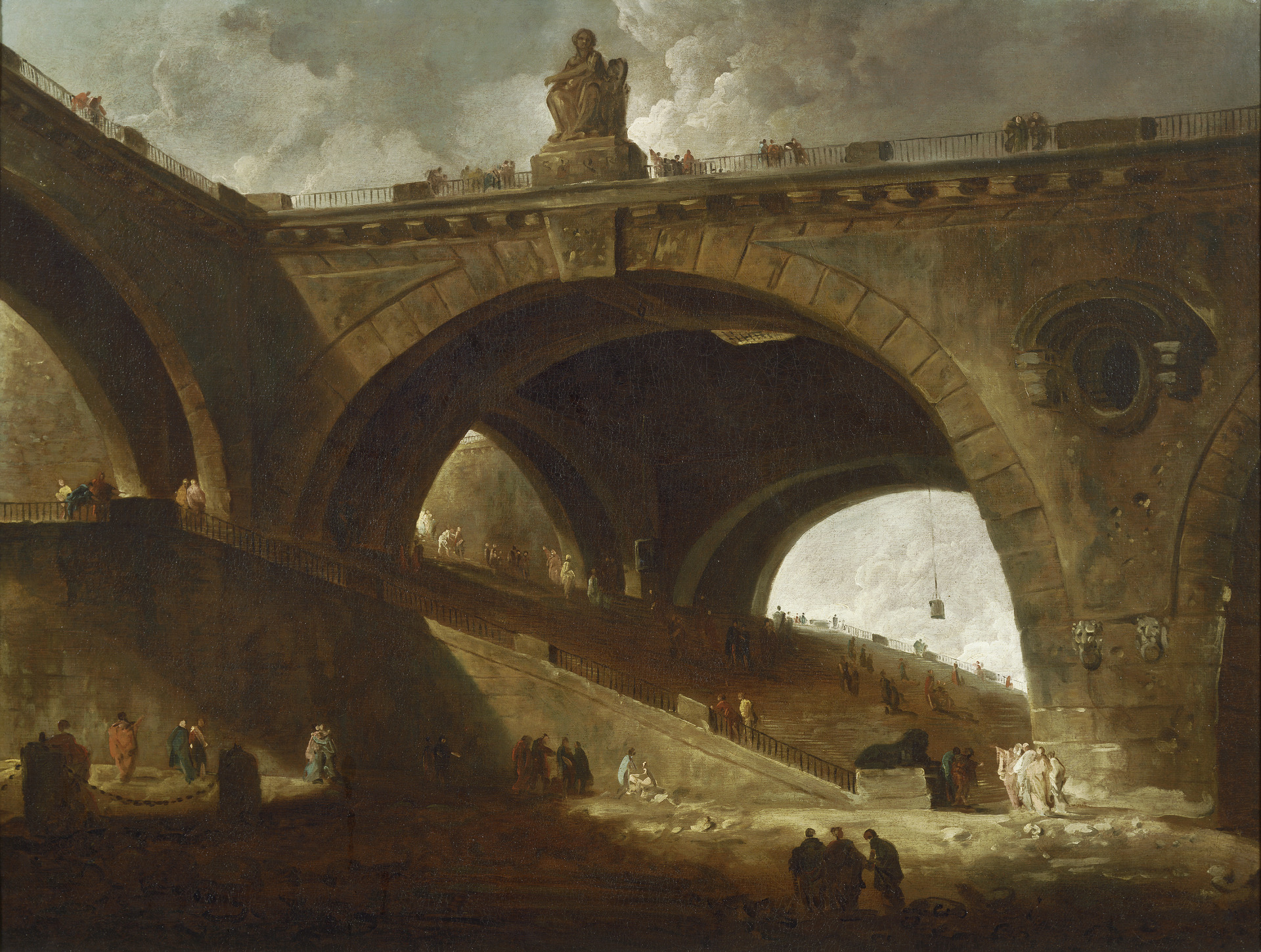
The Old Bridge (1760), 76.2 x 100.3 cm., Yale University Art Gallery

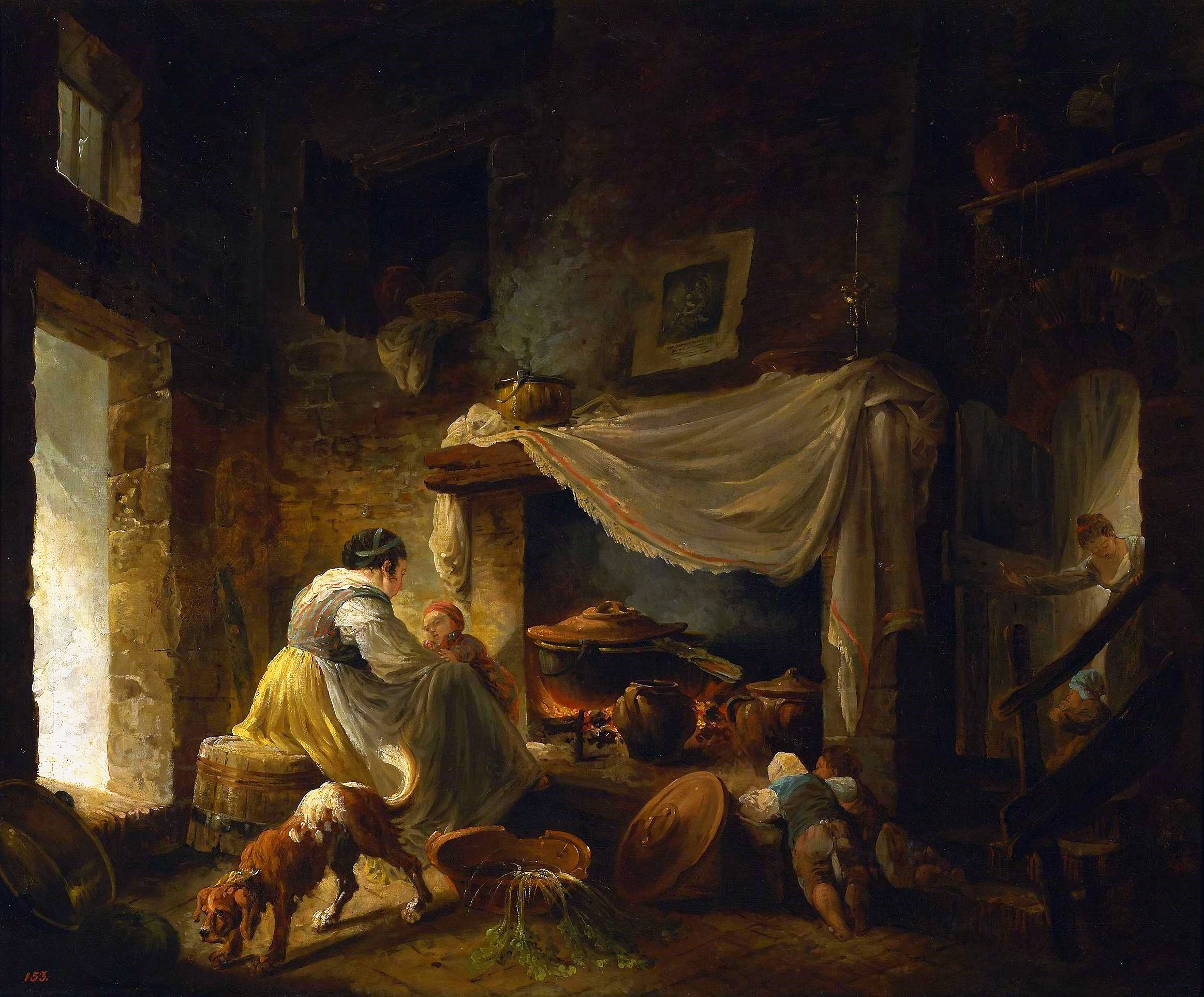
Italian Kitchen (ca. 1760–67), 60 x 75 cm., National Museum in Warsaw

Orator in Prison (1760s), 48 x 38 cm., Nationalmuseum

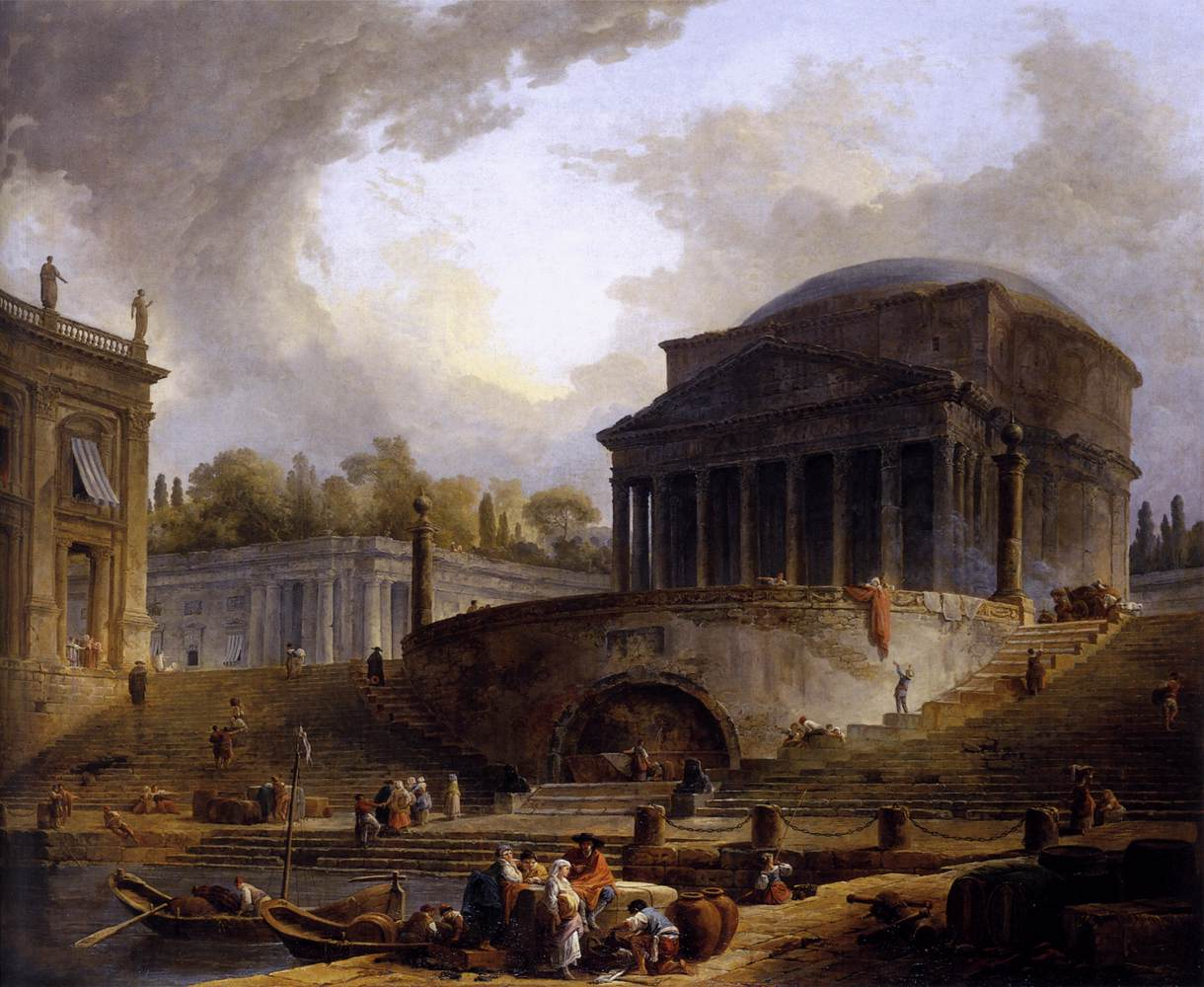
A View of Ripetta (1766), 119 x 145 cm., Beaux-Arts de Paris

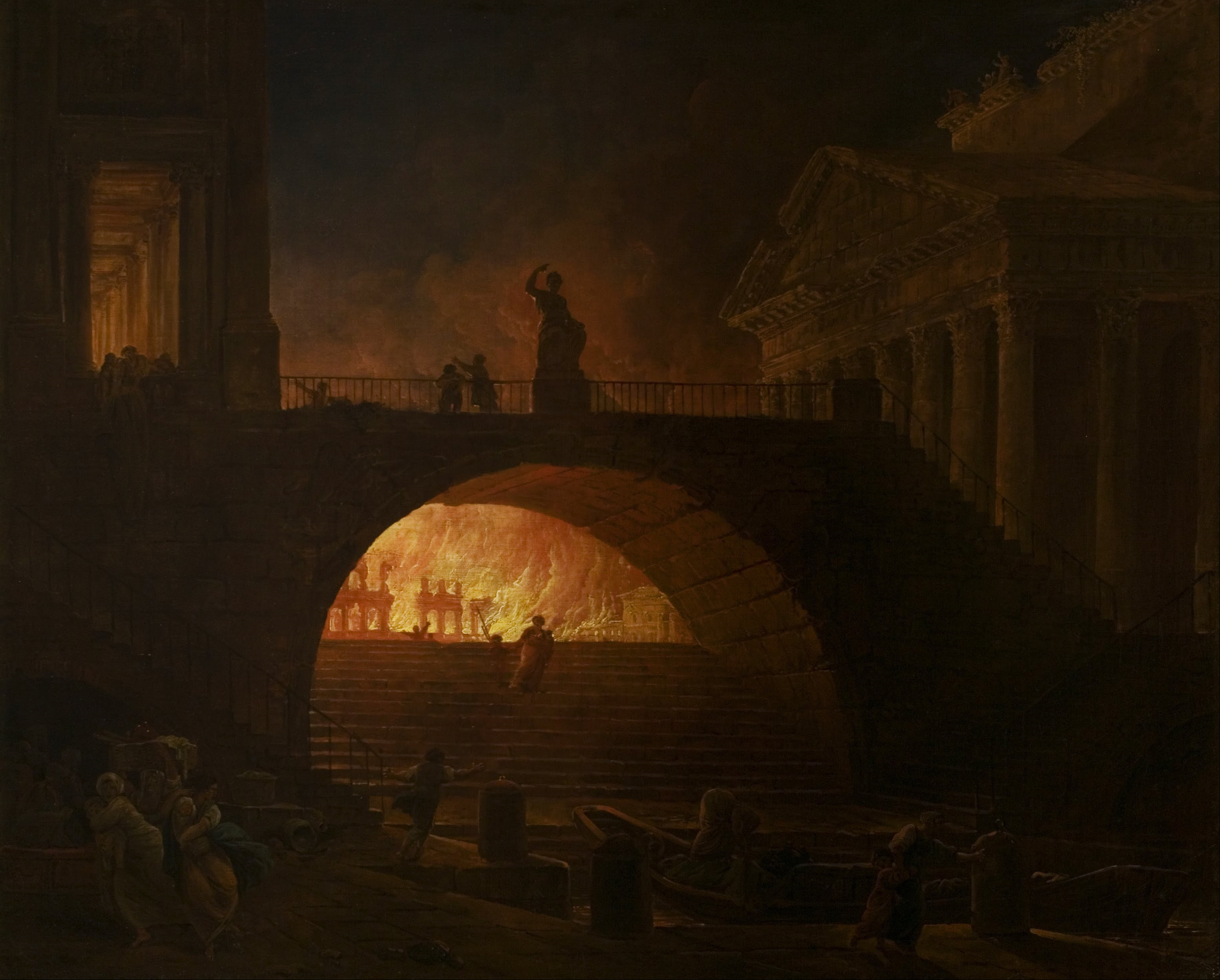
The Fire of Rome (ca. 1771), 75.5 x 93 cm., Musée d'art moderne André Malraux

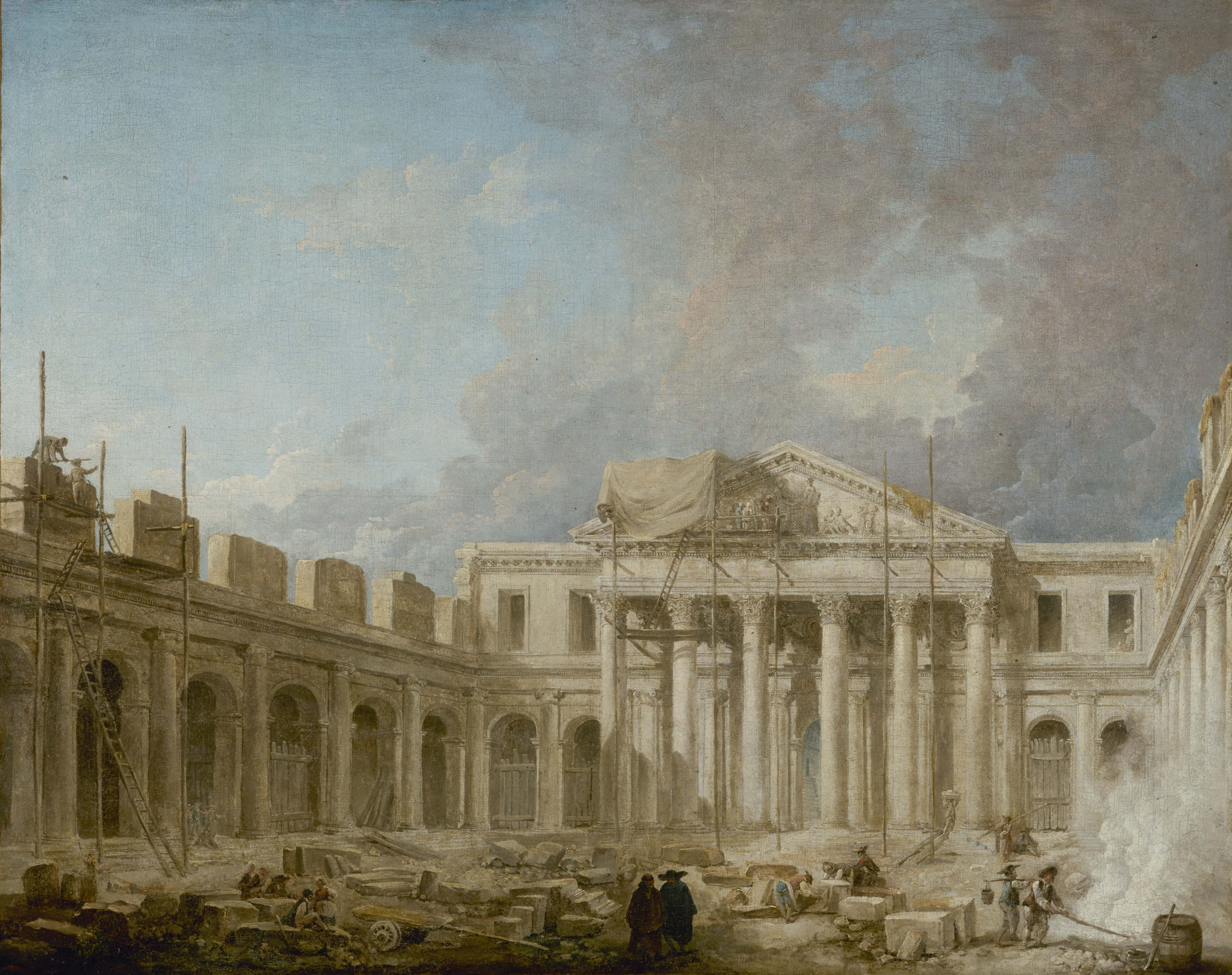
The École de Chirurgie Under Construction (1773), 76 x 91.5 cm., Musée Carnavalet

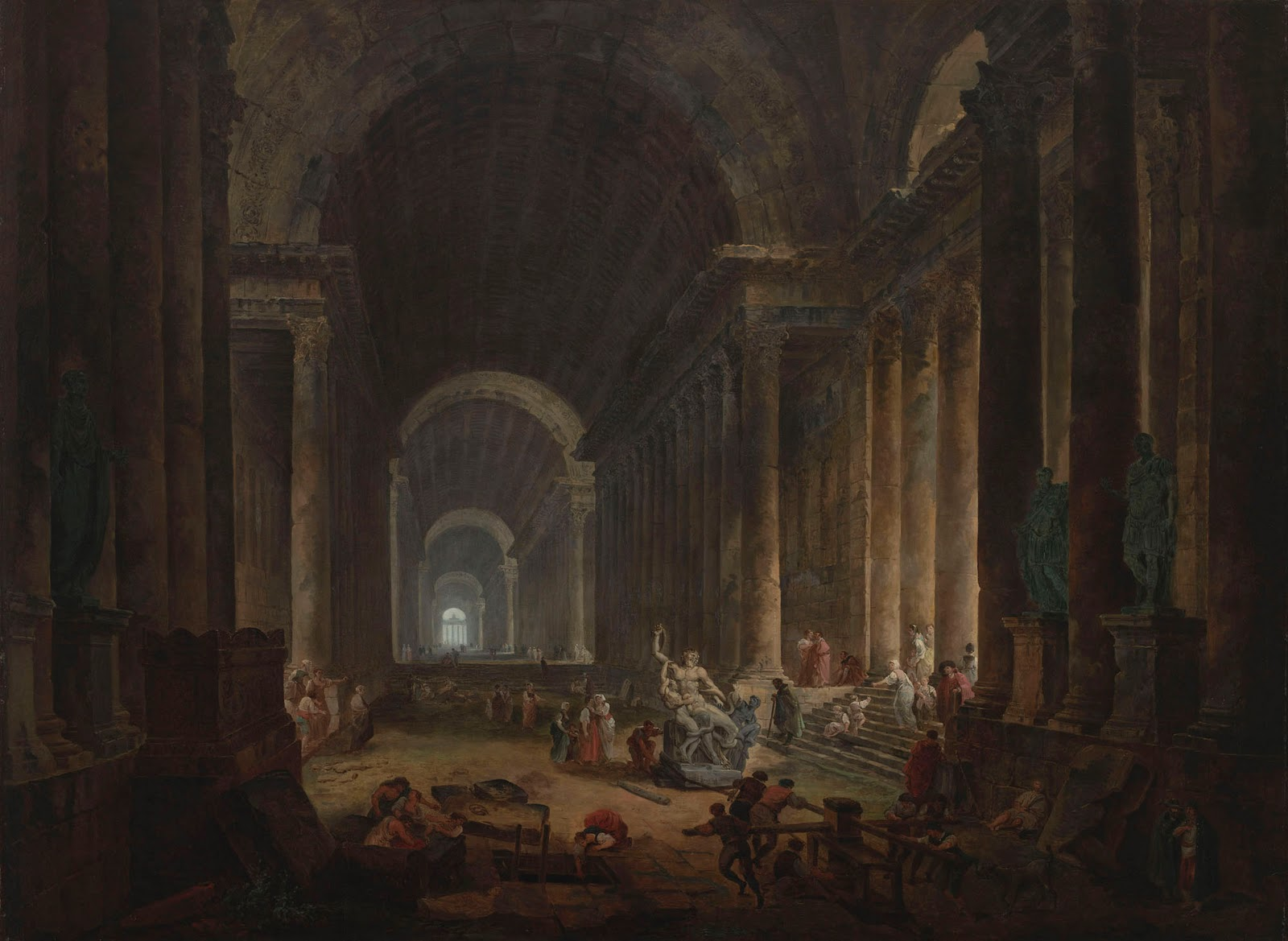
The Finding of the Laocoon (1773), 119.3 x 162.5 cm., Virginia Museum of Fine Arts

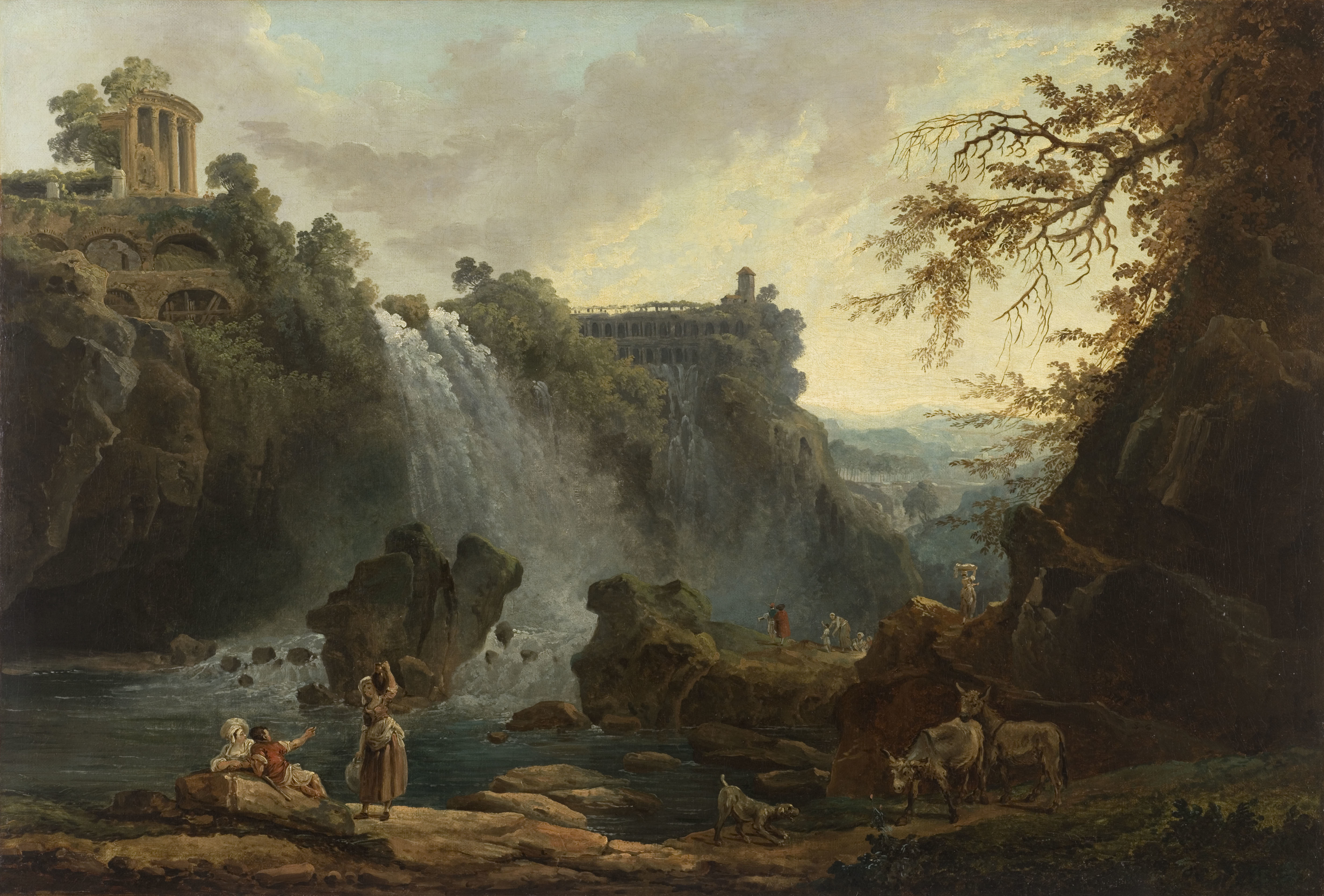
The Tivoli Waterfalls (1776), 50 x 74 cm., Petit Palais

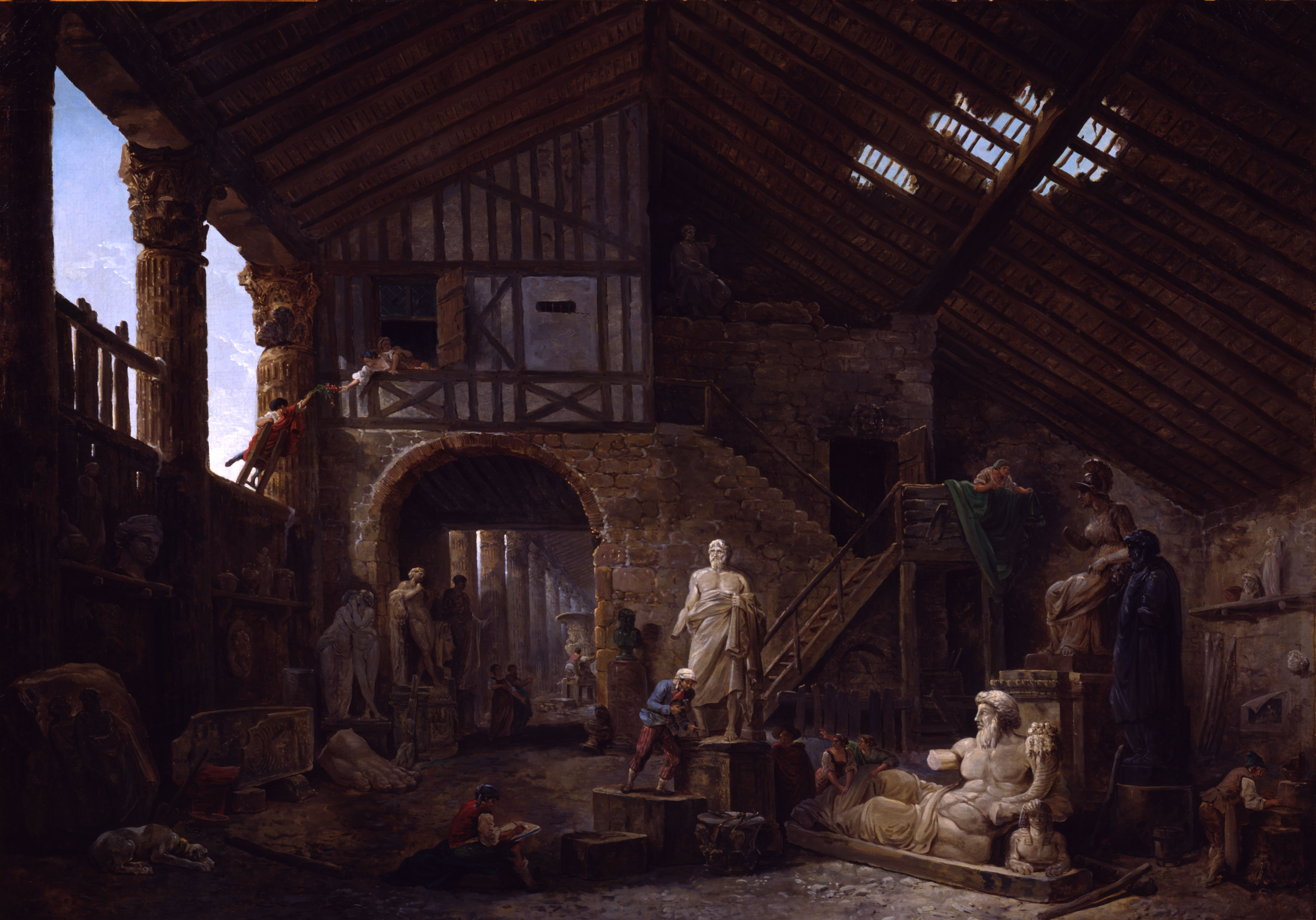
Studio of an Antiquities Restorer in Rome (1783), 101 x 143 cm., Toledo Museum of Art

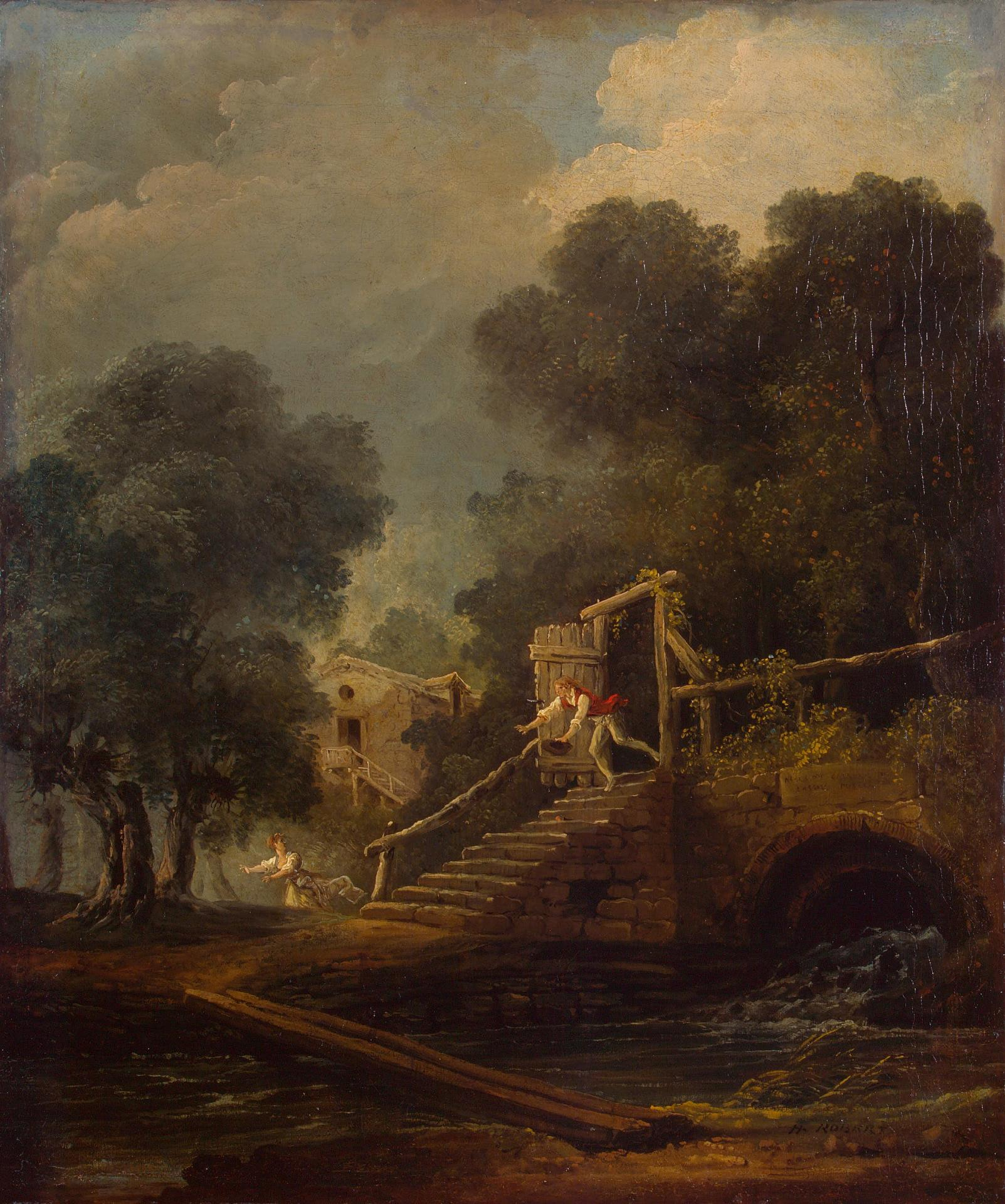
Flight of Galatea (mid 1780s), 50 x: 42 cm., Hermitage Museum

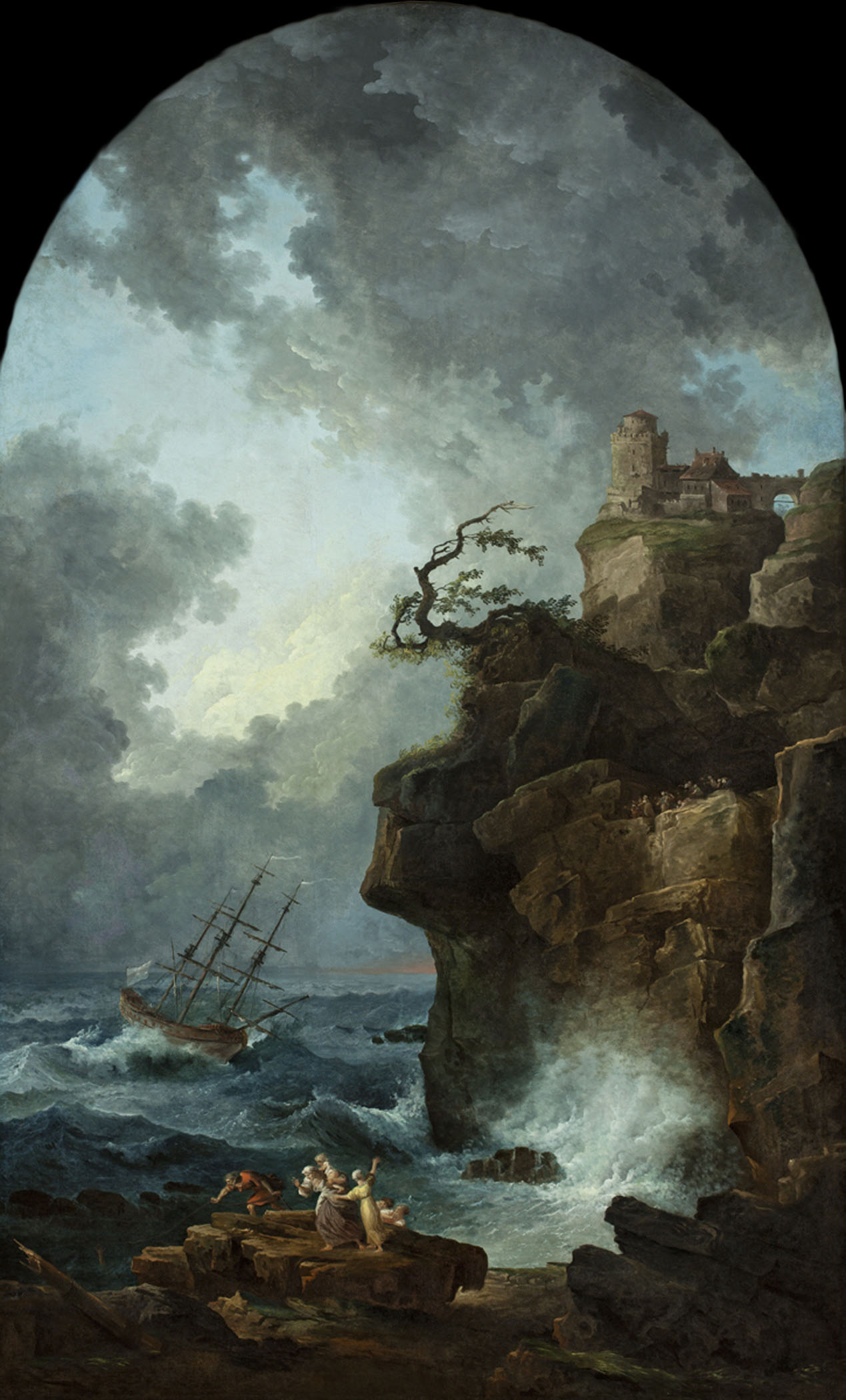
Shipwreck (1780s), 322 x 199 cm., Worcester Art Museum

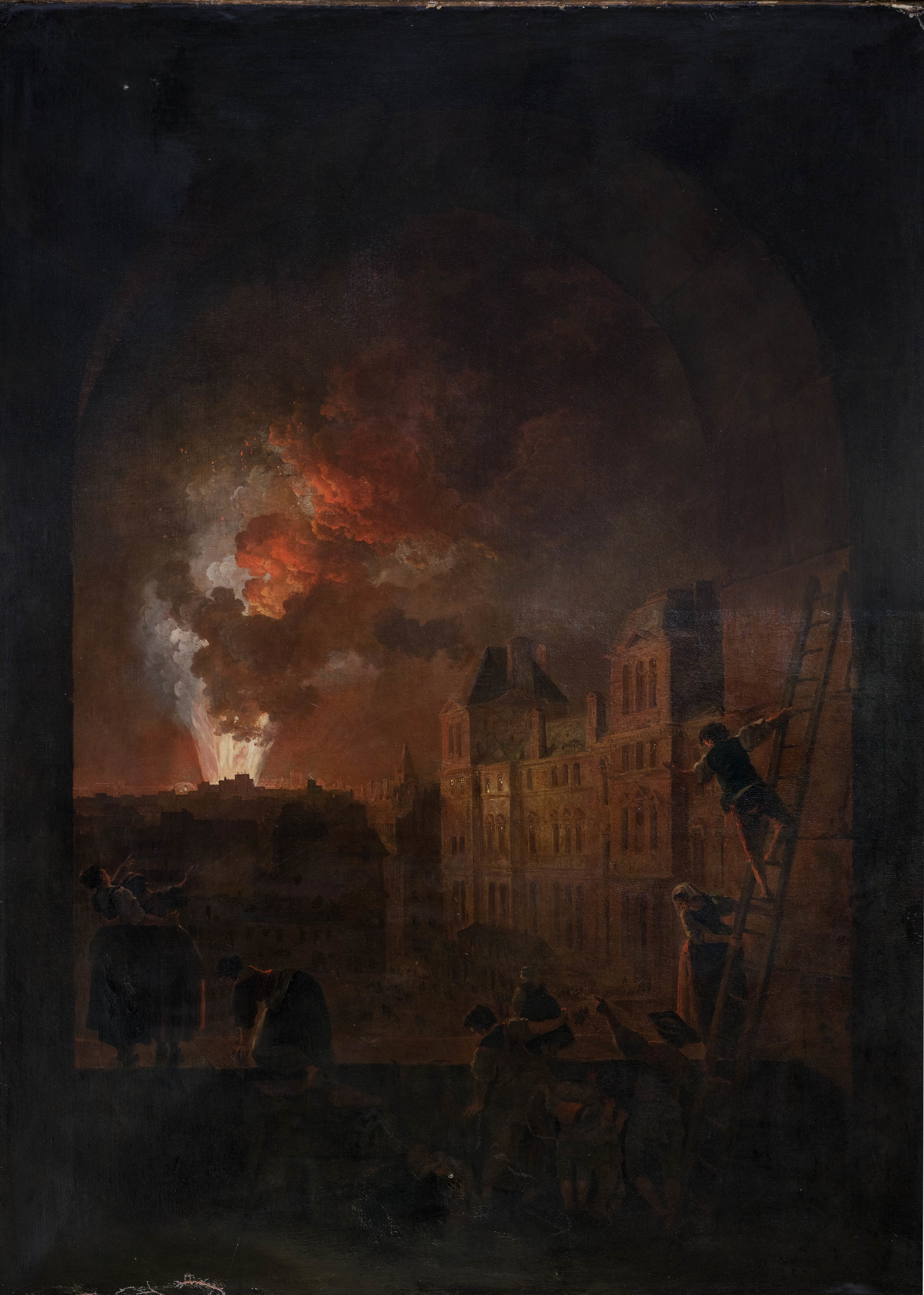
The Fire of the Paris Opera (1781), 123.5 × 171 cm., private collection

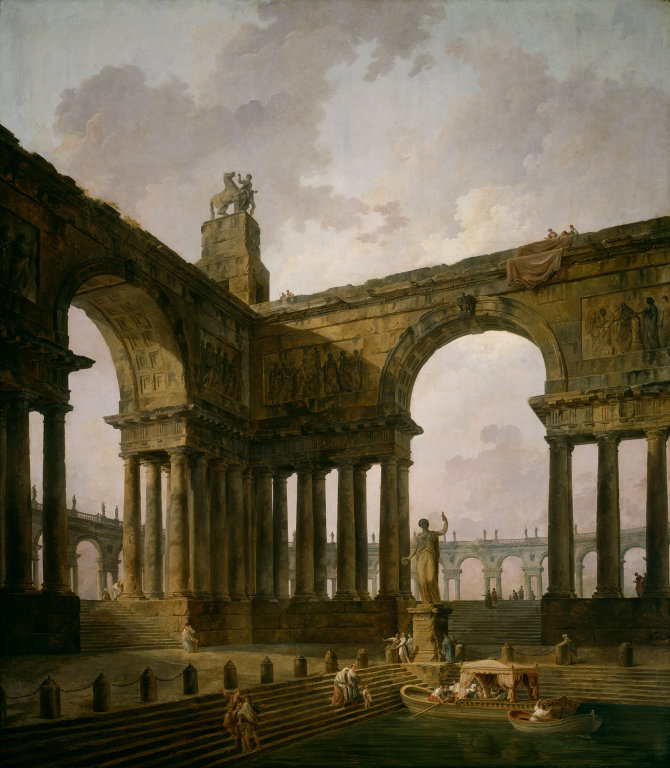
The Landing Place (1787–88), 255 x 223 cm., Art Institute of Chicago

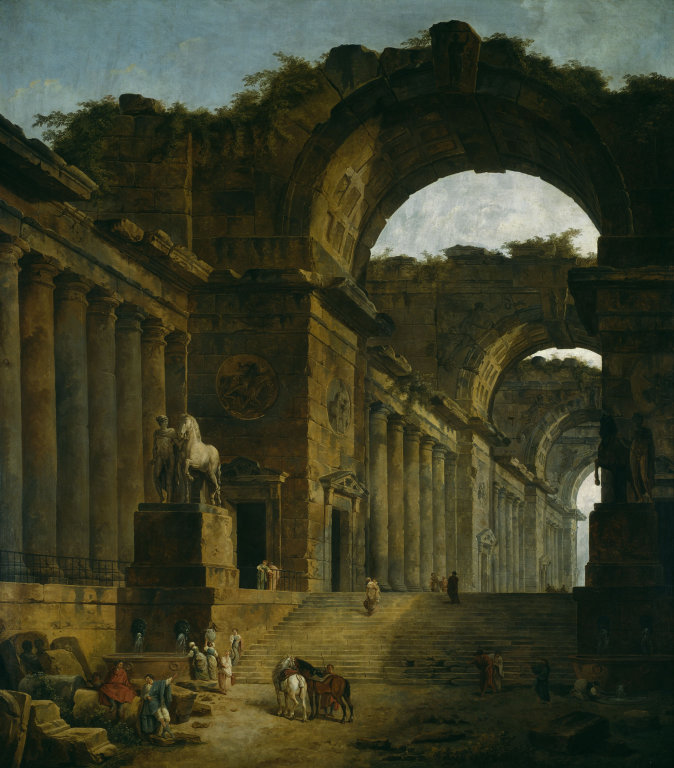
The Fountains (1787–88), 255 x 221 cm., Art Institute of Chicago

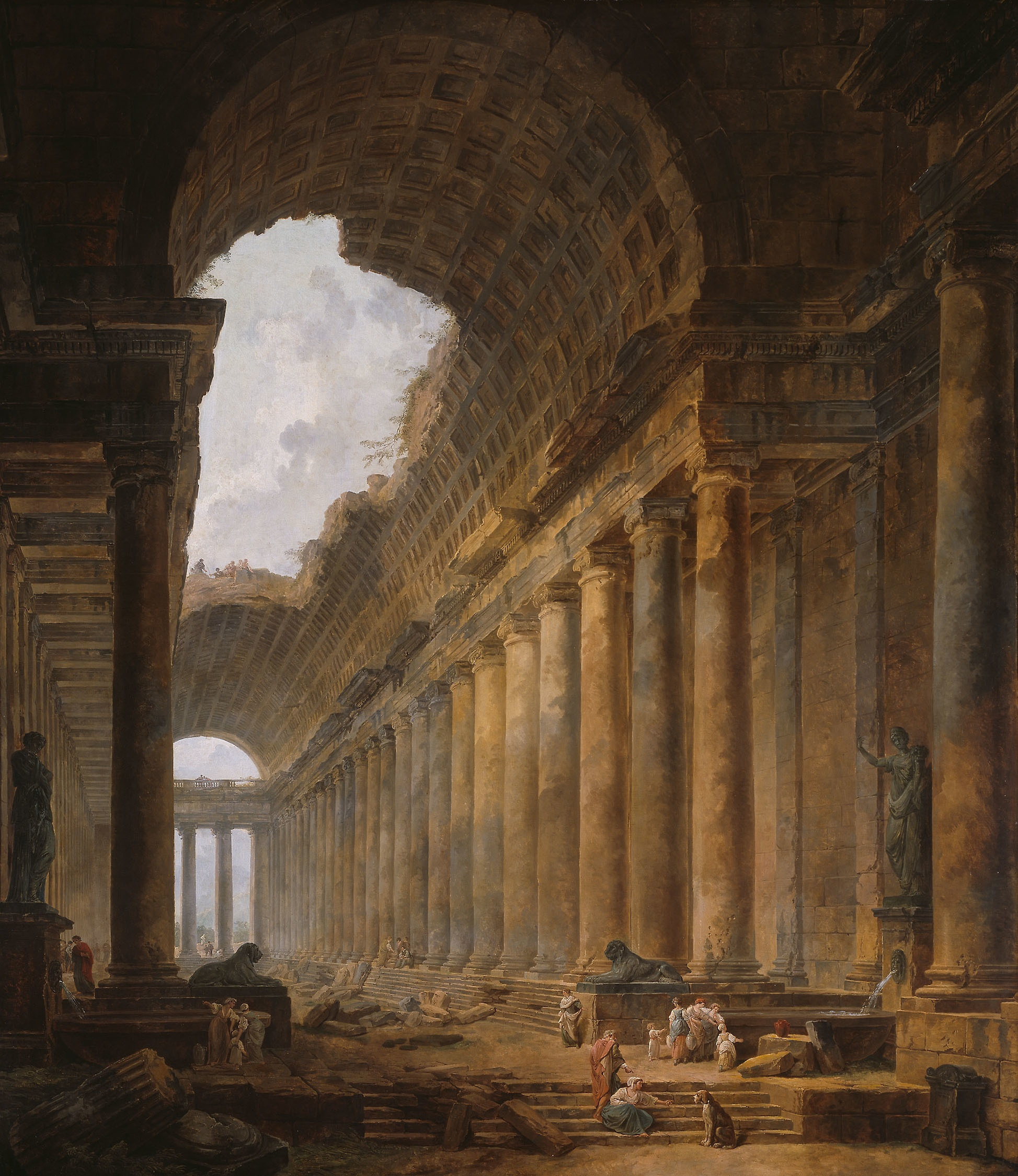
The Old Temple (1787–88), 255 x 223 cm., Art Institute of Chicago

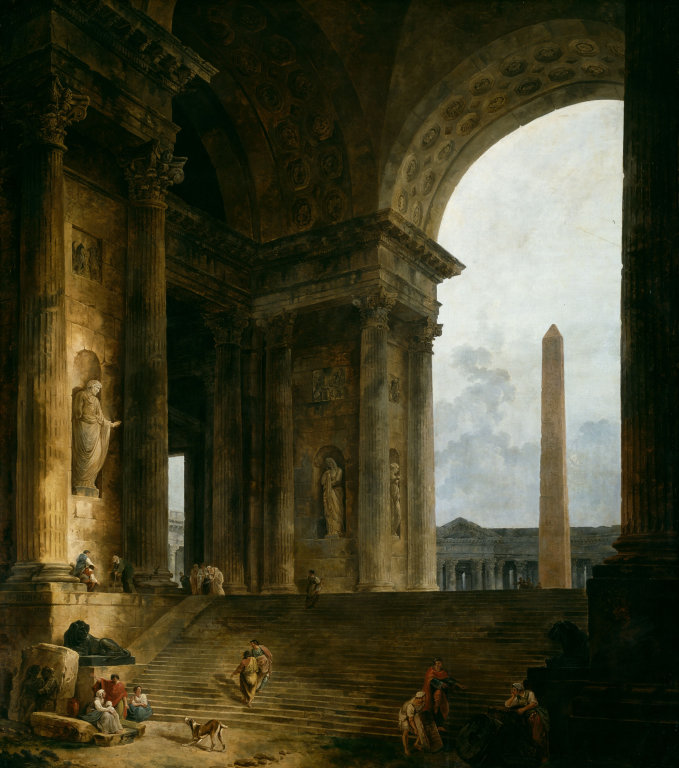
The Obelisk (1787–88), 255 x 223 cm., Art Institute of Chicago

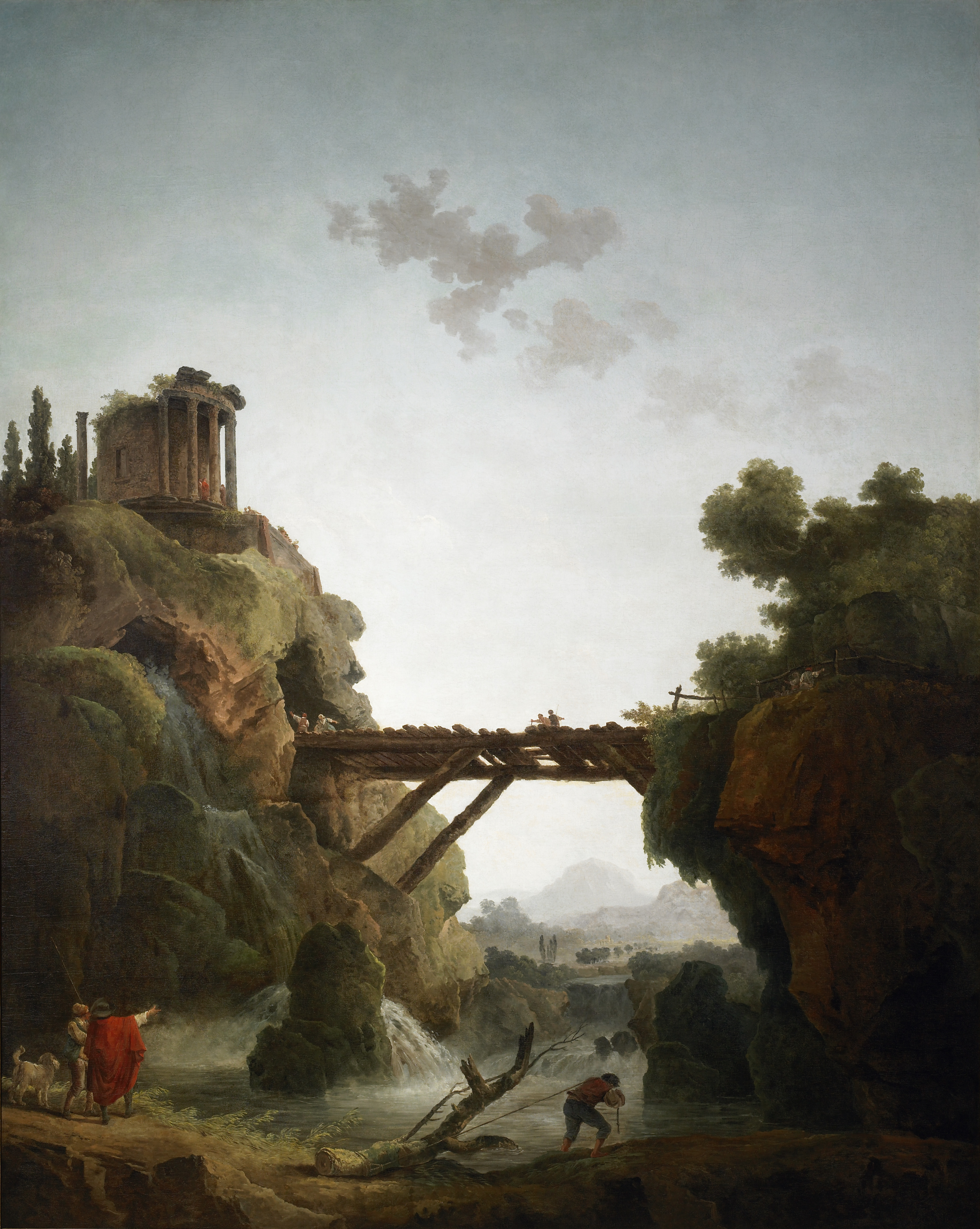
Fantastic View of Tivoli (1789), 241.3 x 190.8 cm., Saint Louis Art Museum

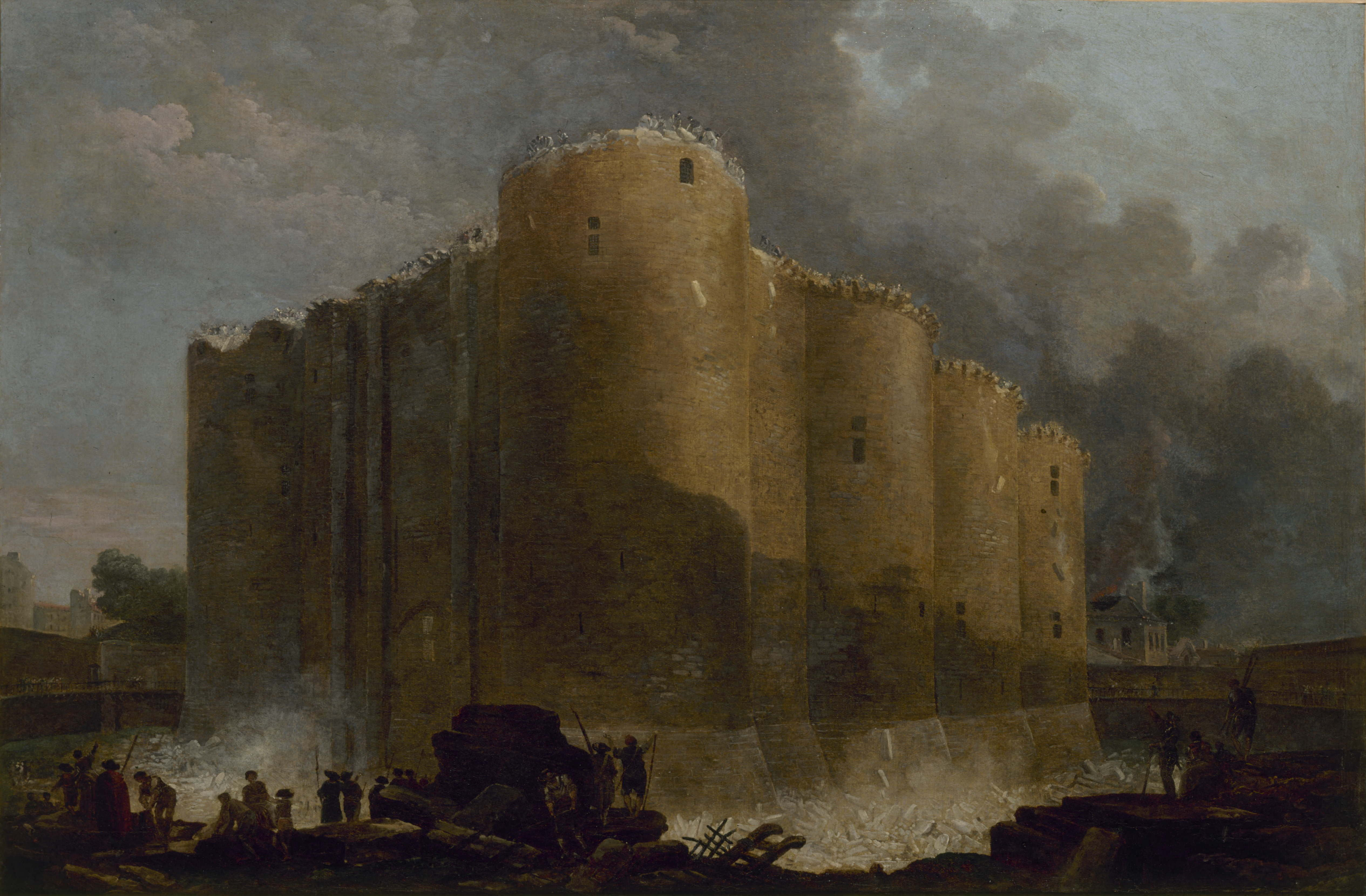
The Bastille During the First Days of its Demolition (1789), 96 x 135 cm., Musée Carnavalet

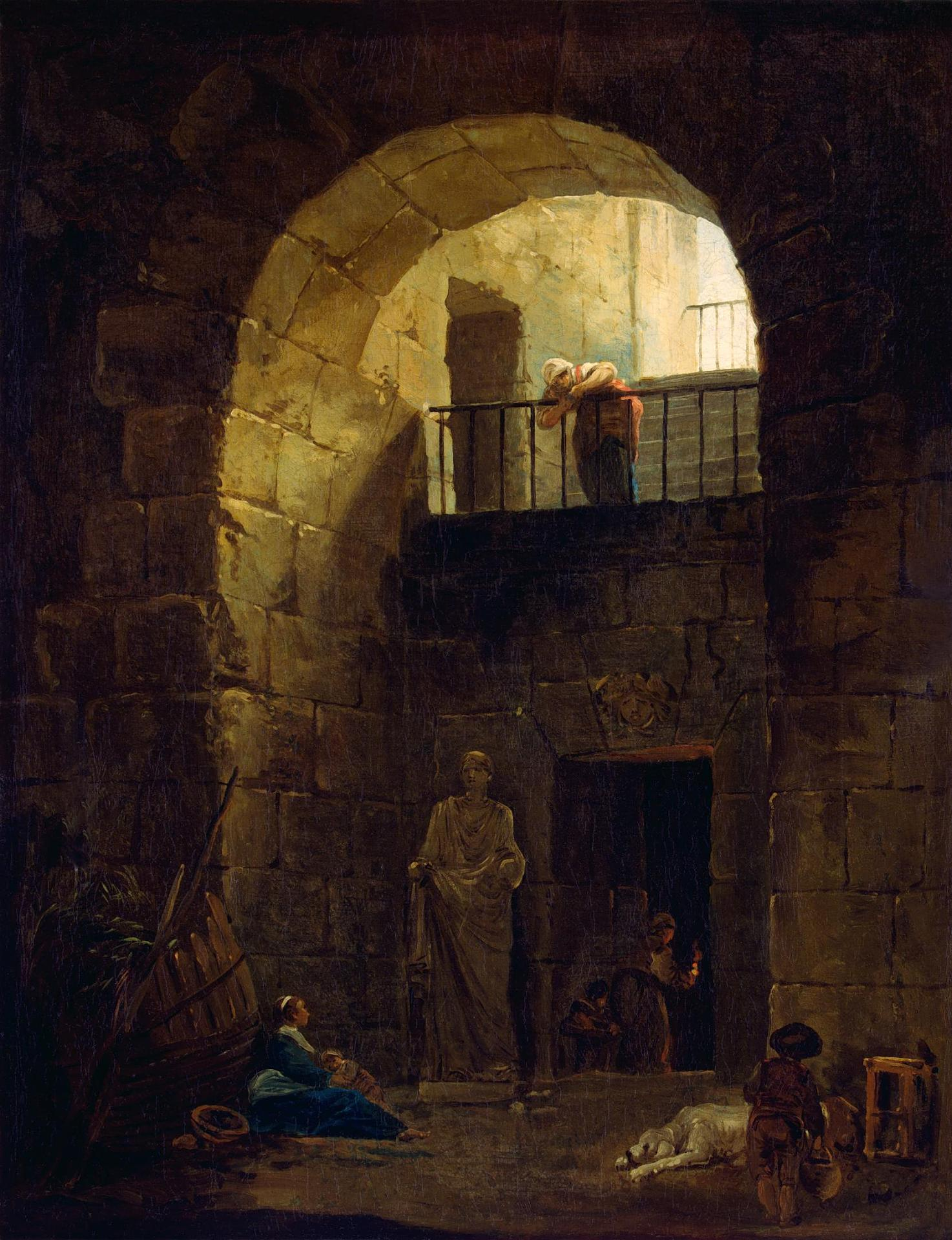
Neglected Statue (1790s), 40 x 31 cm., Hermitage Museum

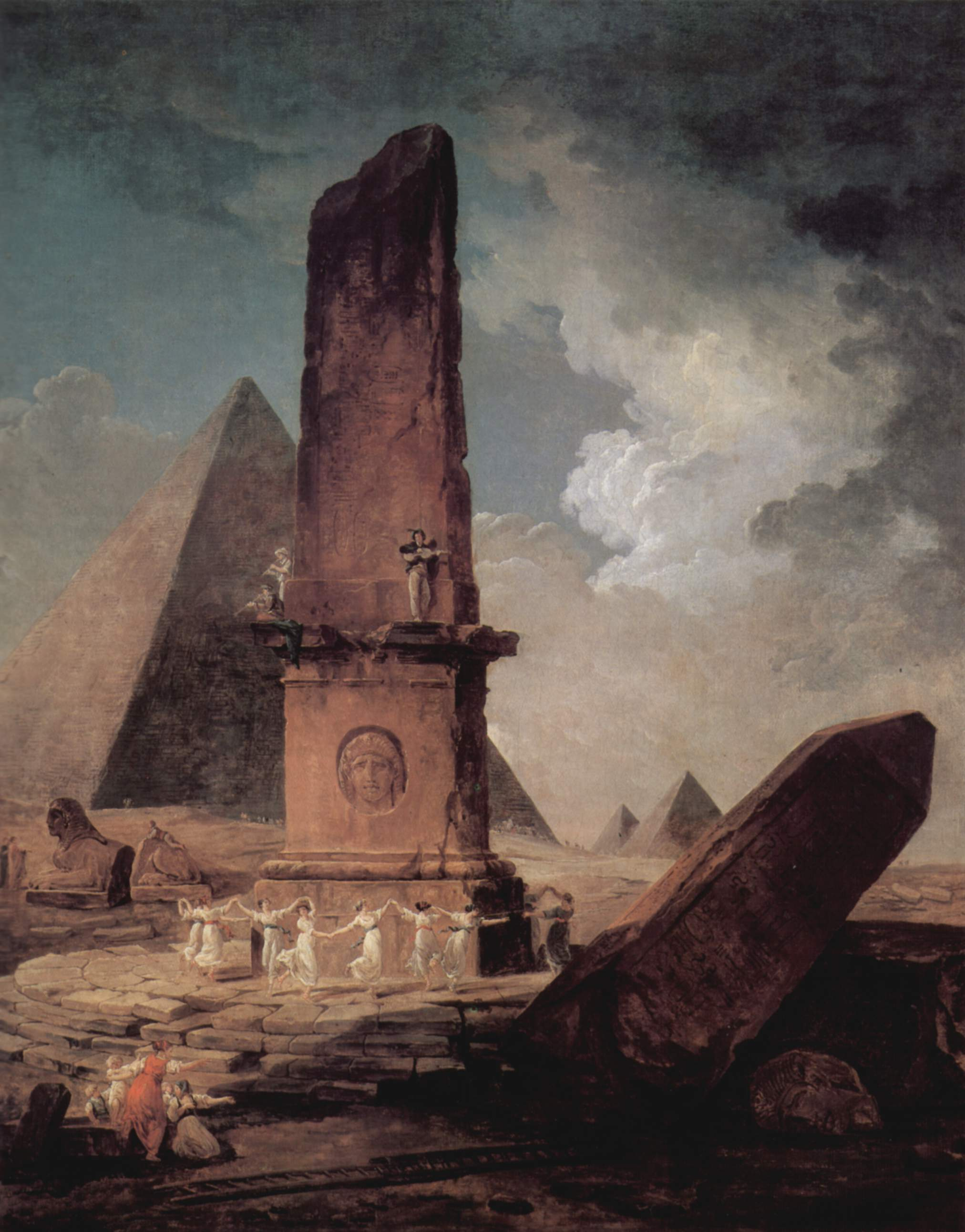
Girls Dancing Around an Obelisk (1798), 120 x 99 cm., Montreal Museum of Fine Arts

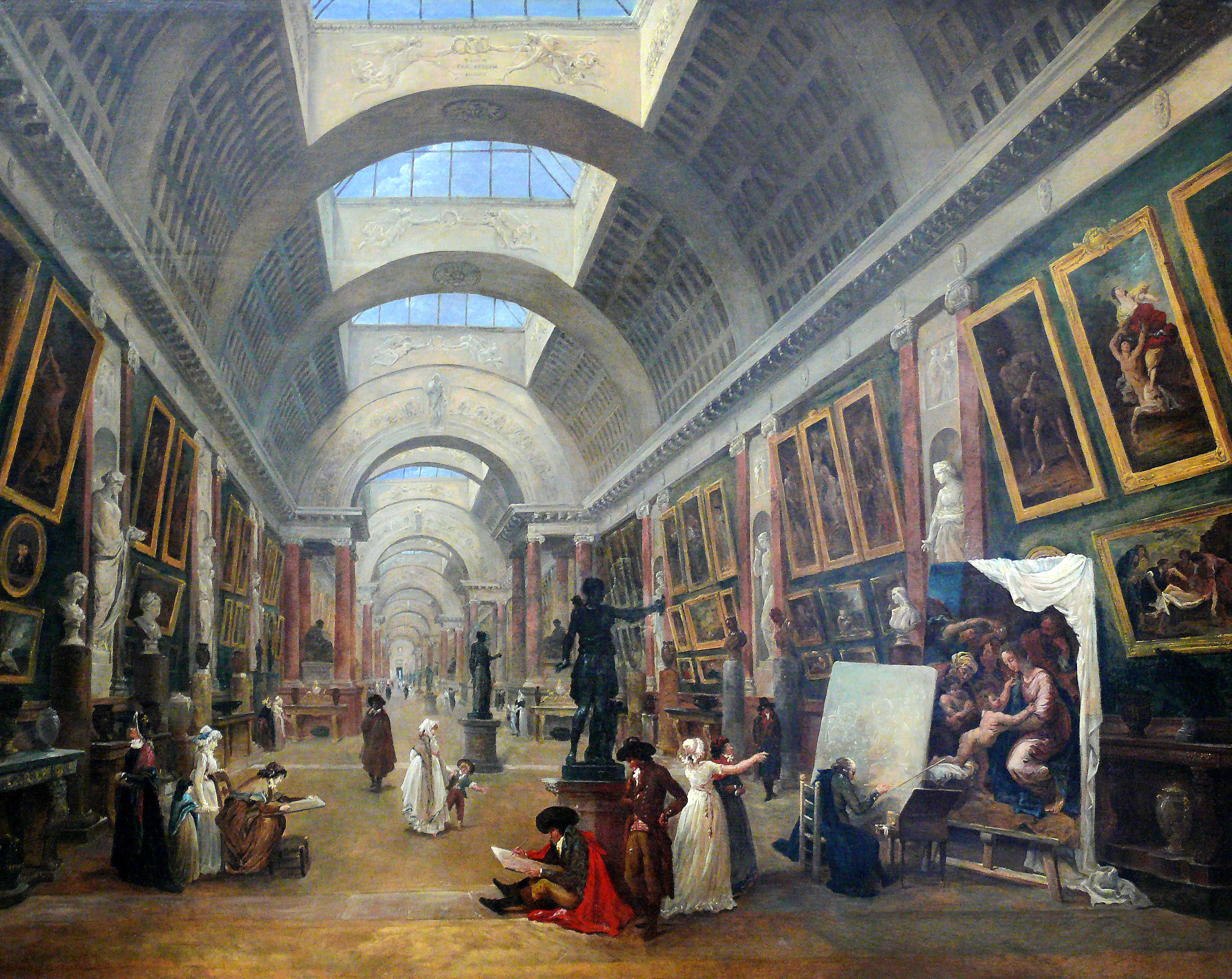
Project for the Transformation of the Grande Galerie du Louvre (1796), 115 x 145 cm., Louvre

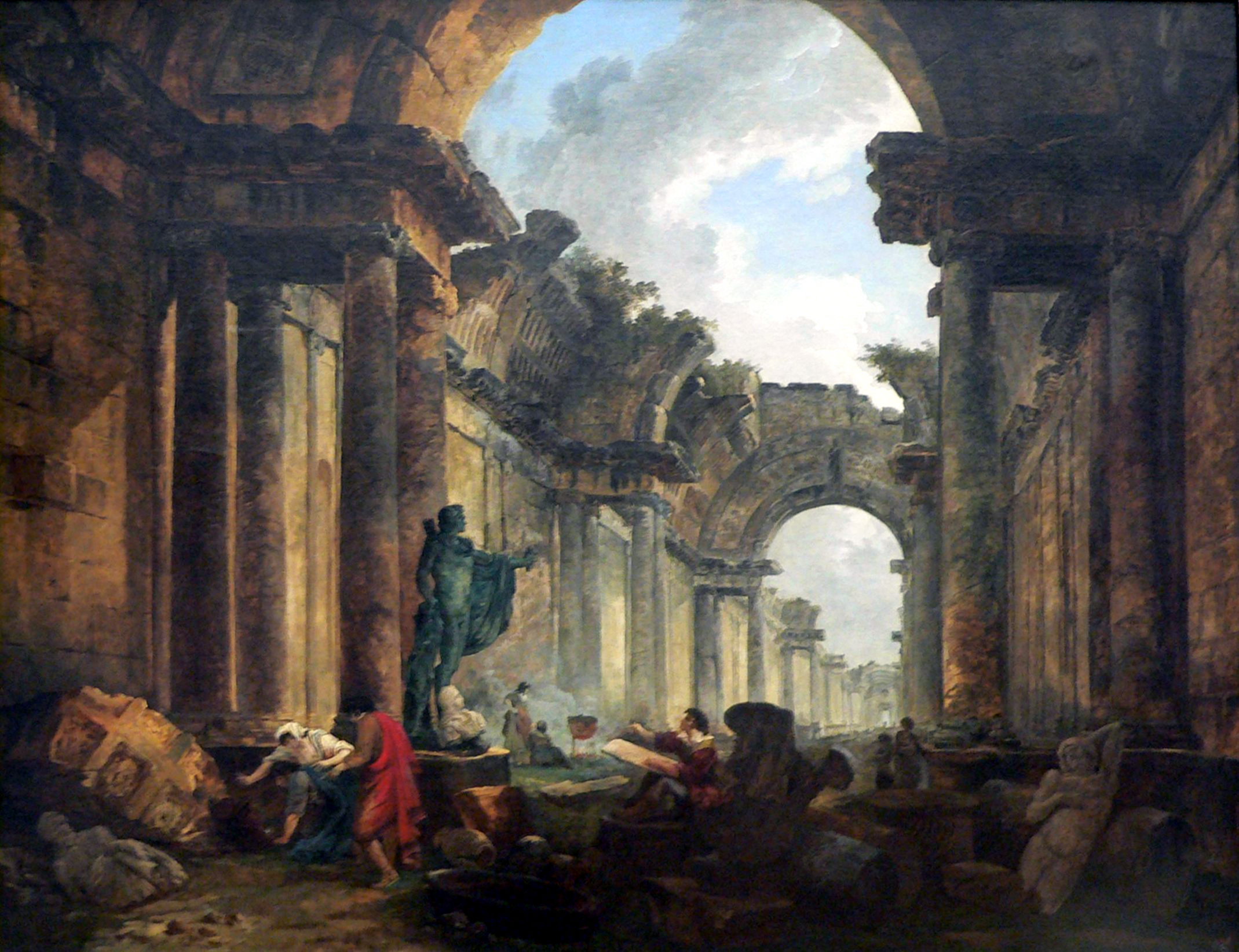
Imaginary View of the Grand Gallery of the Louvre in Ruins (1796), 114.5 x 146 cm., Louvre

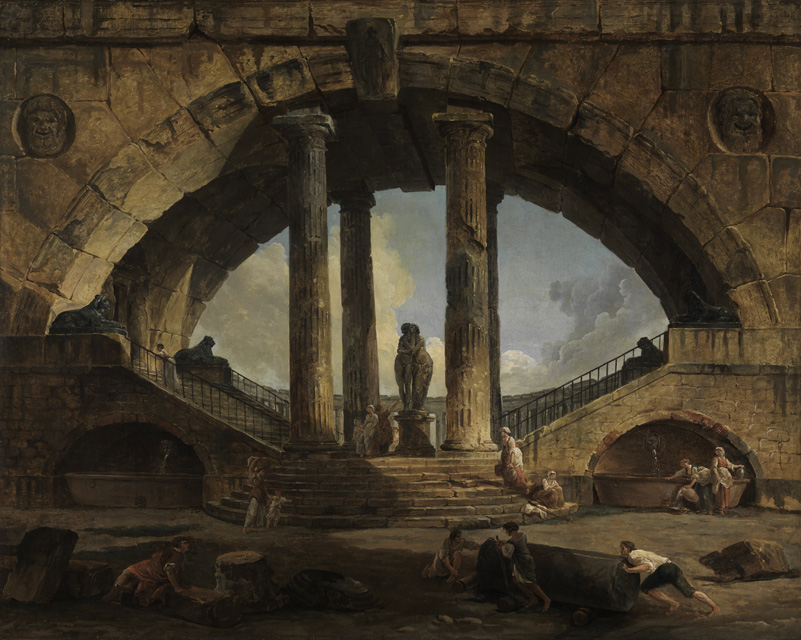
Roman Capriccio (1798 ), 94 x 117 cm., Staatliche Kunsthalle Karlsruhe

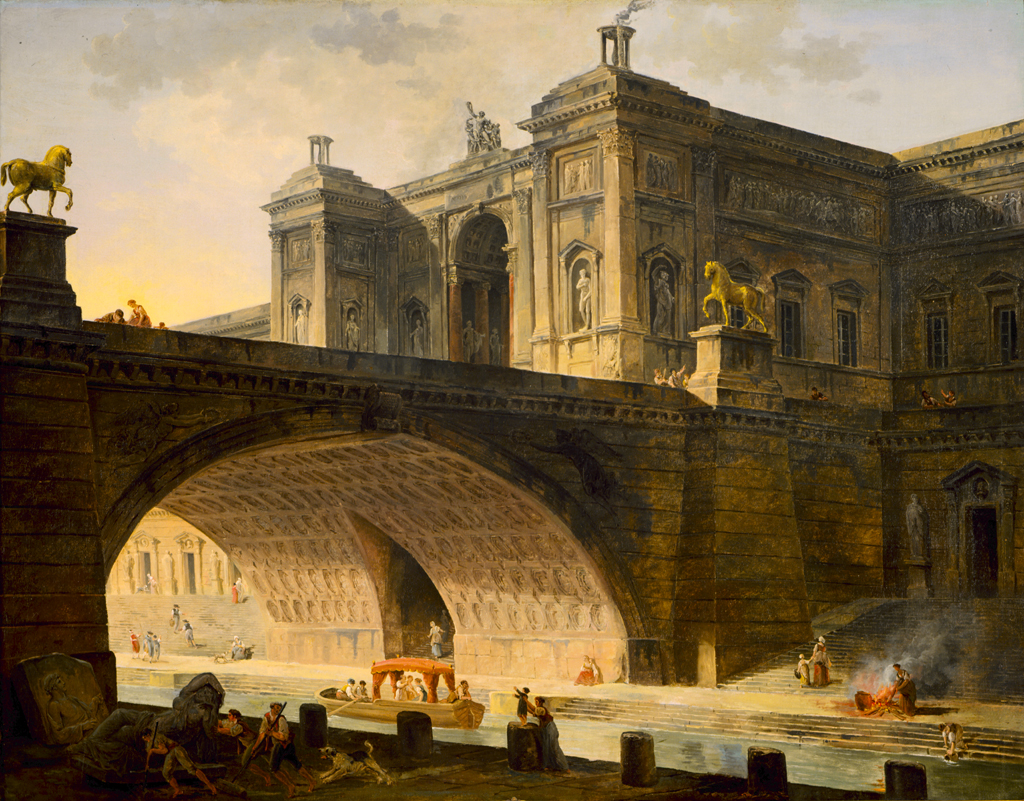
Architectural Fantasy (ca. 1802–08),114 x 147.8 cm., Rhode Island School of Design Museum

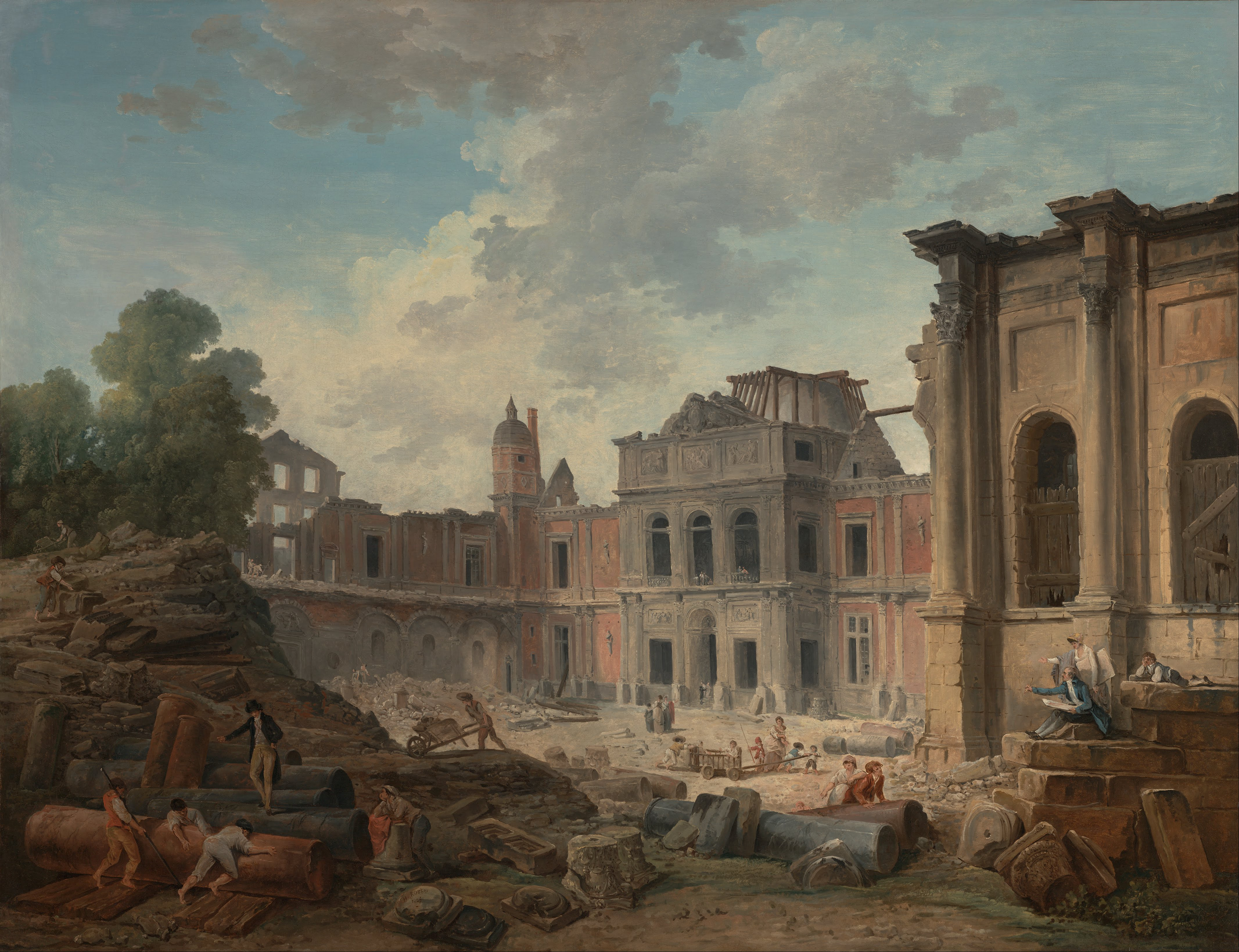
Demolition of the Château of Meudon (1806), 113.3 x 146.8 cm., Getty Museum

== References, notes and sources ==
References and notes

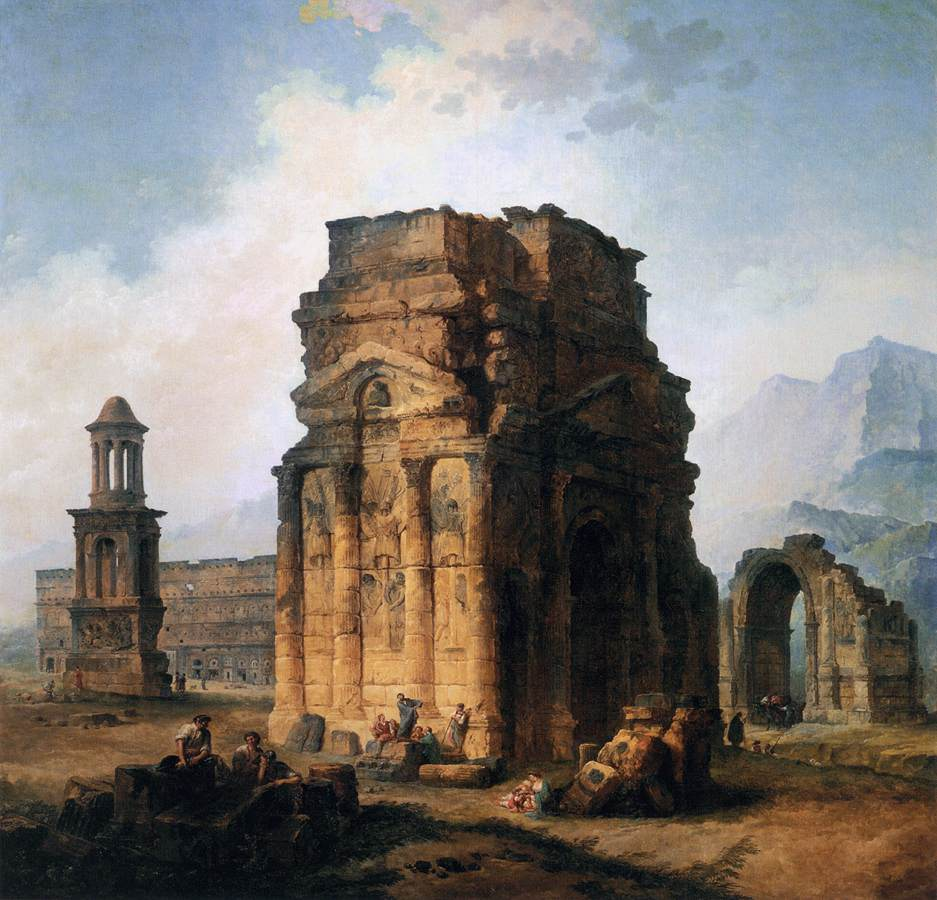
The Arc de Triomphe and the Theatre of Orange, 1787 (Louvre), part of the Principal Monuments of France series

- Adams, William Howard, The French Garden 1500–1800 (New York: Braziller) 1979.
- Huisman, Philippe, French Watercolours of the 18th Century (1969) London, Thames and Hudson ISBN 978-0-500-23105-0
- Wiebenson, Dora, The Picturesque Garden in France (Princeton University Press) 1978.
- Sarah Catala. Les Hubert Robert de Besançon. Milan: Silvana Editoriale, 2013 [catalogue raisonné of drawings from public library and fine art museum of Besançon].
