= Pouzilhac =

- Commune
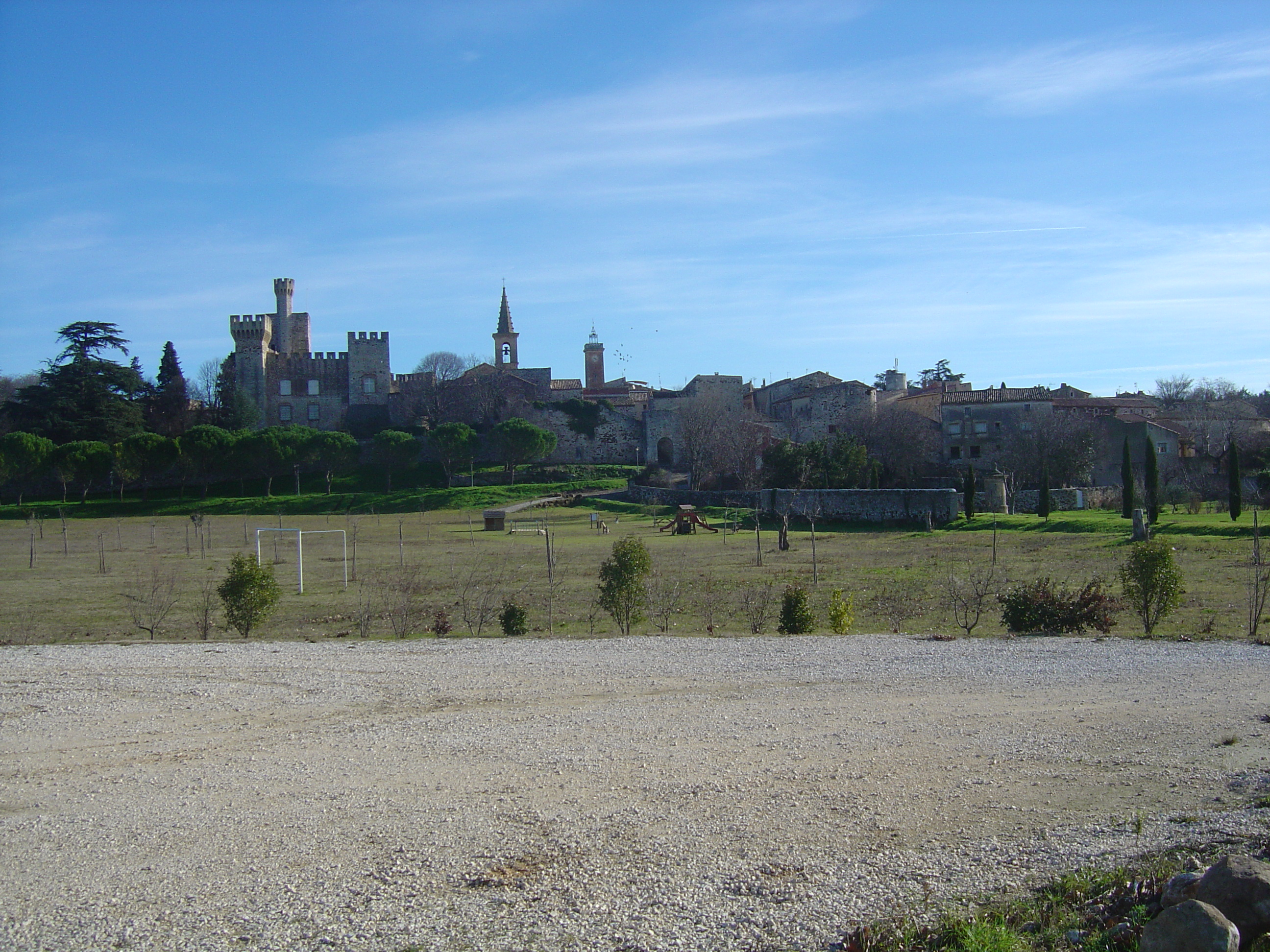
- A general view of Pouzilhac

- Coat of arms
- Location of Pouzilhac
- Location within France Location within Occitanie
- Coordinates: 44°02′31″N 4°34′50″E
- Country: France
- Region: Occitania
- Department: Gard
- Arrondissement: Nîmes
- Canton: Redessan
- Intercommunality: Pont du Gard

Government
  - Mayor (2020–2026): Thierry Astier
- Area^{1}: 16.04 km^{2} (6.19 sq mi)
- Elevation: 230 m (750 ft)
- Highest elevation: 261 m (856 ft)
- Lowest elevation: 168 m (551 ft)
- Population (2023): 756
  - Density: 47.1/km^{2} (122/sq mi)
- Time zone: UTC+01:00 (CET)
  - Summer (DST): UTC+02:00 (CEST)
- INSEE/Postal code: 30207 /30210
- ^{1} French Land Register data, which excludes lakes, ponds, glaciers > 1 km^{2} (0.386 sq mi or 247 acres) and river estuaries.

Pouzilhac (French pronunciation: [puzijak]; Occitan: Posilhac) is a French commune in the Gard department in southern France, formerly Languedoc-Roussillon.

== Geography ==
Pouzilhac is situated on the right bank of the Rhone next to the route national 86 and its close access to the A7 motorway (Remoulins, Tavel, Bollène). The commune covers 16 km² and has 733 inhabitants since the last population census in 2018. Surrounded by the municipalities of Valliguières, La Capelle-et-Masmolène and Saint-Paul-les-Fonts, Pouzilhac is located 14 km southwest of Bagnols-sur-Cèze, the largest city in the area. Located at 218 meters above sea level, the Ragouse is the main waterway that crosses the town of Pouzilhac.

== History ==
The oldest occupation of the site dates back to the Bronze Age, around 2500 B.C.

The Romans left many traces of their occupation, an inscription in the masonry of the church testifies to the existence of a "villa".

During the medieval period, since the 11th century, a castrum existed, first mentioned in 1121 as Castrum de Posilhac. In 1176 it appeared as Villa de Posiliaco In 1258, the municipal archives of Valliguières mention it as 'Posillanum' and in 1355 as 'Posilhacum'. A Posillac took part in the First Crusade alongside the Count of Toulouse.

It was during the religious wars in Europe in 1662 that the community took strategic importance with the construction of fortifications, and experienced a demographic progression. Pouzilhac belonged to the viguerie of Roquemaure, a viguerie of the diocese of Uzès which included fourteen villages: Les Essarts, Lirac, Montfaucon, Pujaut, Rochefort, Roquemaure, Saint-Geniès-de-comolas, Saint-Hilaire-d'Ozilhan, Saint-Laurent-des-Arbres, Sauveterre, Saze, Tavel, and Valliguières.

The 12 th century chapel of Saint-Privat de Pouzilhac appears under the name 'Priory Sainct-Privat de Pouzilhac' in 1620. The chapel occupies a site located along the ancient Roman road linking Nîmes to Alba Augusta, on which ancient inscriptions and epitaphs have been discovered.

== Population ==
Historical population
Year	Pop.	±% p.a.
1968	357	—
1975	372	+0.59%
1982	403	+1.15%
1990	373	−0.96%
1999	434	+1.70%
2007	594	+4.00%
2012	622	+0.93%
2017	713	+2.77%
2023	756	+0.98%
Source: INSEE

== Sights ==
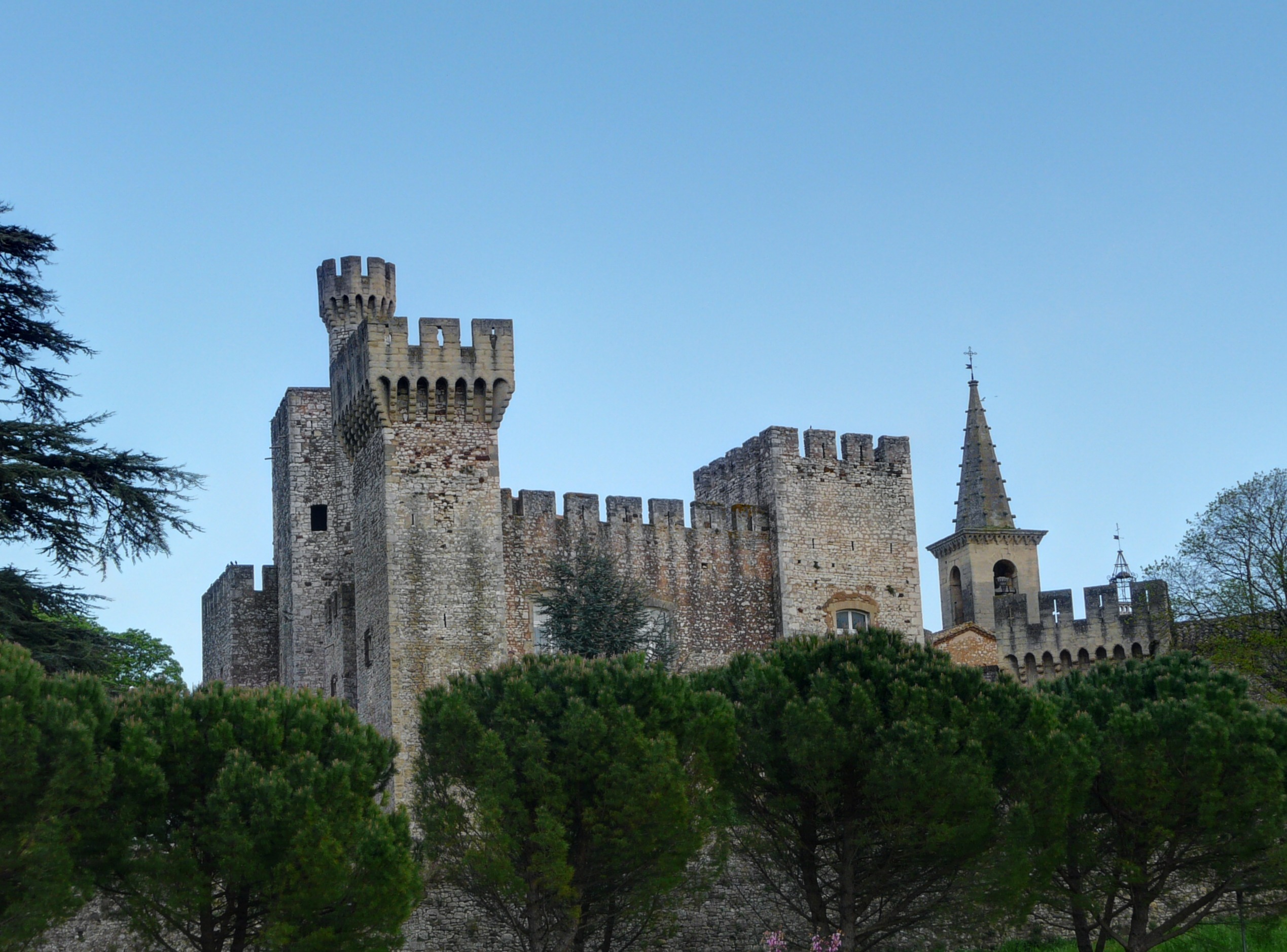
Chateau and église de Pouzilhac

There is the Château de Pouzilhac and the Église Saint-Privat de Pouzilhac, (both private property) as well as the Chapelle Saint-Privat de Pouzilhac. There are also 4 UNESCO World Heritage Sites within a radius of 30 km around Pouzilhac: Nimes, Orange, Avignon and Pont du Gard.

== See also ==
- Communes of the Gard department
