= Budenicenses =

Gallic tribe

The Budenicenses were a small Gallic tribe dwelling in the present-day Gard department during the Roman period.

== Name ==
They are attested as Budenicenses on an inscription found in Collias (Gard). A dedication to the god Mars Budenicus was also discovered in the same town.

The ethnonym Budenicenses derives from the Celtic term *budīnā, meaning 'troop, host', probably 'troop guarding the frontier' (cf. Old Irish buiden, Middle Welsh byddin 'troop, army'; Late Latin bodǐna 'boundary marker' > French borne, a loanword from Gaulish).

The town of Bezouce (Gard), attested as Biducia in 1146 AD, is named after the Gallic tribe.

== Geography ==
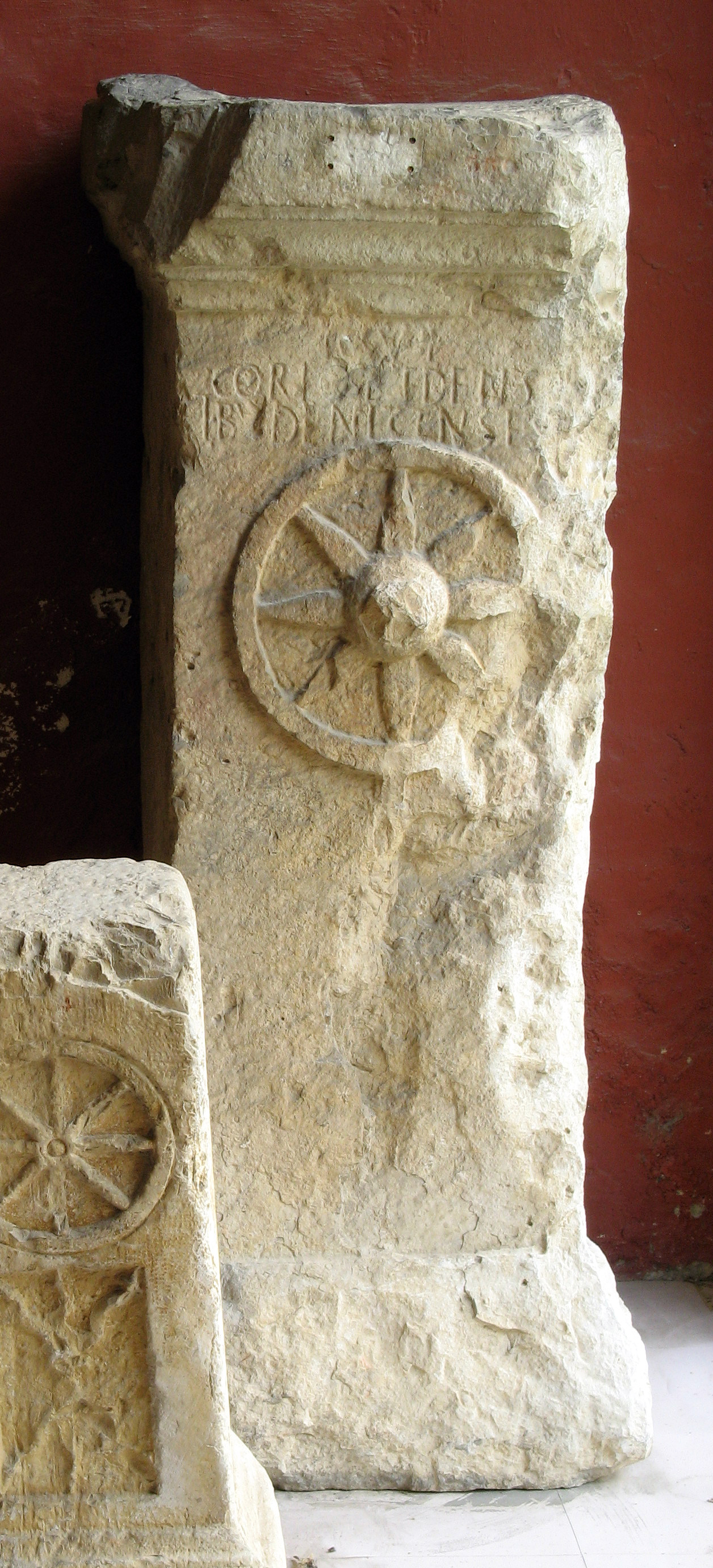
Altar dedicated to Jupiter by the Budenicenses and Coriobedenses

On the basis of their association with Mars Budenicus, the Budenicenses have been identified as community neighbouring Collias, similar to the Coriobedenses.

This identification is consistent with a localisation at or near Bezouce (Biducia), located near Collias, whose name is linguistically related to that of the Budenicenses.

== Religion ==
They appear on an inscription dedicated to Jupiter alongside the Coriobedenses.

Inscription	Translation	Reference
Iovi Coriobedens[es] et Budenicenses [--]	To Jupiter, the communities of the Coriobedenses and the Budenicenses.	CIL XII 2972

While the Budenicenses honoured Jupiter collectively with the Coriobedenses, they also had a distinct protective deity of their own, identified as Mars Budenicus. The latter is probably a Celtic equivalent of Mars Militaris.

The epithet Budenicus indicates a specific association with, or protection of, the local community. By contrast, the absence of such a qualifying epithet in the dedication to Jupiter may suggest his primacy, reflecting his role as a supreme deity who integrates and receives other divinities within his sphere.

Inscription	Translation	Reference
Marti Budenic[o] Gratus Sever[i] filius	To Mars Budenicus, Gratus, son of Severus.	CIL XII 2973

== Bibliography ==
- Christol, Michel; Fiches, Jean-Luc; Rabay, Dominique (2007). "Le sanctuaire de la Combe de l'Ermitage à Collias (Gard)". Revue archéologique de Narbonnaise. 40 (1): 15–32. doi:10.3406/ran.2007.1175.
- de Bernardo Stempel, Patrizia (2008). "Linguistically Celtic ethnonyms: towards a classification". In García Alonso, Juan Luis (ed.). Celtic and Other Languages in Ancient Europe. Ediciones Universidad de Salamanca. ISBN 978-8478003358.
- Delamarre, Xavier (2003). Dictionnaire de la langue gauloise: Une approche linguistique du vieux-celtique continental. Errance. ISBN 9782877723695.
- Fleuriot, Léon (1982). "Notes sur le celtique antique". Études celtiques. 19 (1): 121–128. doi:10.3406/ecelt.1982.1705.
