= Coriobedenses =

Ancient Gallic tribe

The Coriobedenses were a small Gallic tribe dwelling in the present-day Gard department during the Roman period.

== Name ==
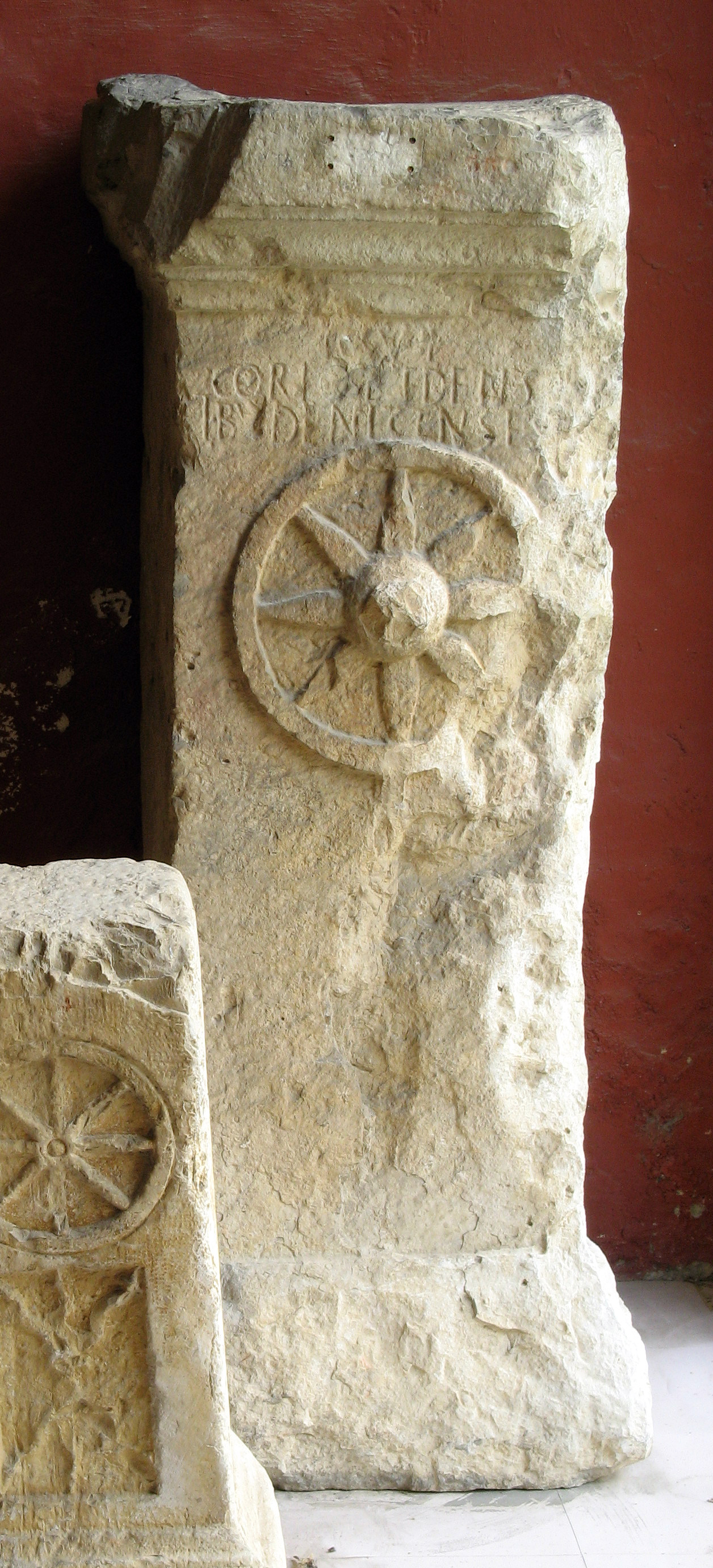
Altar dedicated to Jupiter by the Budenicenses and Coriobedenses

They are attested as Coriobedenses on an inscription found in Collias (Gard).

The first element derives from the Gaulish stem corio- ('army, troop'), itself from Proto-Indo-European *kóryos ('army, people under arms').

== Geography ==
The Coriobedenses lived near modern Collias, as attested by their mention on the Collias inscription.

== Religion ==
They appear on an inscription dedicated to Jupiter alongside the Budenicenses.

Inscription	Translation	Reference
Iovi Coriobedens[es] et Budenicenses [--]	To Jupiter, the communities of the Coriobedenses and the Budenicenses	CIL XII 2972

== Bibliography ==
- Christol, Michel; Fiches, Jean-Luc; Rabay, Dominique (2007). "Le sanctuaire de la Combe de l'Ermitage à Collias (Gard)". Revue archéologique de Narbonnaise. 40 (1): 15–32. doi:10.3406/ran.2007.1175.
- Delamarre, Xavier (2003). Dictionnaire de la langue gauloise: Une approche linguistique du vieux-celtique continental. Errance. ISBN 9782877723695.
