= Vallia gens =

Ancient Roman family

The gens Vallia was a minor plebeian family of ancient Rome. Hardly any members of this gens are mentioned by Roman writers, save the orator Vallius Syriacus, but a number are known from epigraphy, including Lucius Vallius Tranquillus, governor of Mauretania Tingitana under Domitian, and Gaius Vallius Maximianus, who governed the same province and several others at various points nearly a century later.

== Praenomina ==
The main praenomina of the Vallii were Lucius and Gaius, the most common names at all periods of Roman history. A number of Vallii bore other common names, including Publius, Marcus, Quintus, Titus, and Aulus. Additionally, some of the Vallii bore the praenomen Statius, a name usually associated with the Oscan-speaking peoples of central and southern Italy.

== Members ==
This list includes abbreviated praenomina. For an explanation of this practice, see filiation.

- Gaius Vallius C. f., one of the quinquevirs (Note: A commission of five men.) tasked with building or maintaining the walls of Asisium in Umbria, commemorated in an inscription dating from the early or middle part of the first century BC, at some point between the Social War and the Perusine War.
- Gaius Vallius C. l. Bucco, a freedman buried at Perusia in Umbria, in a tomb dating from the late first century BC.
- Titus Vallius, served as quaestor at Bononia in Cisalpine Gaul in an uncertain year belonging to the first half of the first century. A Marcus Marius was his colleague in the quaestorship.
- Vallia M. D. l. Irene, a freedwoman named along with several freedmen and women of the Visinia gens in a sepulchral inscription from Rome, dating from the first half of the first century.
- Marcus Vallius L. f. Mar[...], named along with Lucius Vallius Rufus, Lucius Vallius Nam[...], and Optata Fadia Statia, in a sepulchral inscription from Aquileia in Venetia and Histria, dating from the first half of the first century.
- Lucius Vallius L. f. Rufus, named along with Marcus Vallius Mar[...], Lucius Vallius Nam[...], and Optata Fadia Statia, in a sepulchral inscription from Aquileia, dating from the first half of the first century.
- Lucius Vallius L. l. Nam[...], a freedman named along with Marcus Vallius Mar[...], Lucius Vallius Rufus, and Optata Fadia Statia, in a sepulchral inscription from Aquileia, dating from the first half of the first century.
- Vallia, the wife of Marcus Ceionius Silanus, with whom she built a first-century tomb at Albanum in Latium for their son, Marcus Ceionius Flavinus.
- Lucius Vallius L. f., the grandson of Gaius Rufellius Rufus, who built a first-century family sepulchre at Pola in Venetia and Histria for himself, Seia Maxuma, perhaps his wife, his daughter, Rufellia Secunda, and his grandson Vallius.
- Vallia Ɔ. l. Arbuscula, named in a first-century inscription from Rome.
- Vallius Leonta, buried in a first-century tomb at Rome, built by his friend, Publius Atius Eratianus.
- Lucius Vallius, buried together with his wife at Ficulea in Latium, in a first- or second-century tomb built by his son, Lucius Vallius Telesphor, and his daughter-in-law, Vallia Aphrodisia.
- Vallia Aphrodisia, together with her husband, Lucius Vallius Telesphor, built a first- or second-century tomb at Ficulea for Telesphor's father, Lucius Vallius, and mother, whose name has not been preserved. Aphrodisia and Telesphor were also the parents of Lucius Vallius Tranquillianus, a small child buried at Ficulea.
- Vallia Onesima, buried in a first- or second-century tomb at Rome, built by her husband, Gaius Vinnius Justus.
- Lucius Vallius L. f. Telesphor, together with his wife, Vallia Aphrodisia, built a first- or second-century tomb at Ficulea for his father, Lucius Vallius, and mother, whose name has not been preserved. Aphrodisia and Telesphor were also the parents of Lucius Vallius Tranquillianus, a small child buried at Ficulea.
- Lucius Vallius L. f. L. n. Tranquillianus, a small child buried at Ficulea, aged one year, five months, and twenty days, in a first- or second-century tomb built by his parents, Lucius Vallius Telesphor and Vallia Aphrodisia.
- Statius Vallius St. f. Rufus, one of a number of Romans named in a dedicatory inscription from Thebes in Achaia, dating from AD 14. A Statius Vallius Faustus is named in the same inscription.
- Statius Vallius Faustus, one of a number of Romans named in a dedicatory inscription from Thebes, dating from AD 14. A Statius Vallius Rufus is mentioned at the beginning of the same inscription.
- Vallius Syriacus, a skilled orator known to Seneca the Elder, was a friend of Gaius Asinius Gallus, whom the emperor Tiberius imprisoned in AD 30. Syriacus, a man of great learning, was put to death for no reason besides his friendship with Gallus.
- Marcus Vallius M. f. Maurinus, a native of Segontia in Hispania Tarraconensis, was a soldier in the Legio XI Claudia, serving in the century of Valerius Postumus. He was buried at Burnum in Dalmatia, aged thirty-two, having served for twelve years, in a tomb built by his heirs, dating between the reign of Claudius and that of Nero.
- Lucius Vallius Carpus, buried at Rome, in a tomb built by his daughter, Vallia Primitiva, dating from the latter half of the first century, or the first half of the second.
- Vallia L. f. Primitiva, dedicated a tomb at Rome, dating from the latter half of the first century, or the first half of the second, for her father, Lucius Vallius Carpus.
- Publius Vallius Eutychus, buried at Rome in a tomb built by his wife, Claudia Chrysanthe, and son, Publius Vallius Nicephor, dating between the latter half of the first century and the end of the second.
- Vallia Melitine, buried at Rome, in a tomb dating between the middle of the first century and the middle of the second, built by her husband, Lucius Junius Aphrodisius.
- Publius Vallius P. f. Nicephor, together with his mother, Claudia Chrysanthe, built a tomb at Rome, dating between the latter half of the first century and the end of the second, for his father, Publius Vallius Eutychus.
- Gaius Vallius P[...], built a tomb at Rome, dating between the latter half of the first century and the end of the second, for the soldier Titus Obulcius Am[...].
- Vallia P. f. Procula, built a tomb at Interamnia Praetuttiorum in Picenum, dating between the latter half of the first century and the end of the second, for her son, Gaius Vettius Laetus, and mother, Vitellia Tertia, according to the terms of the latter's will.
- Vallia Epicharis, built a tomb at Rome, dating from the late first or early second century, for Vallia Successa, perhaps her daughter.
- Vallia Successa, buried at Rome, aged twenty, in a tomb built by Vallia Epicharis, dating from the late first or early second century.
- Gaius Vallius Proculus, one of the aediles at Sora in Latium in AD 87. His colleague was Lucius Caesius Clemens.
- Lucius Vallius Tranquillus, governor of Mauretania Tingitana in AD 88, granted Roman citizenship to the soldiers of various military units who had served for twenty-five years, along with their wives and children.
- Publius Vallius Alypus, built an early second-century tomb at Rome for his son, also named Publius Vallius Alypus.
- Publius Vallius P. f. Alypus, buried at Rome, aged twenty-six, in a tomb built by his father, also named Publius Vallius Alypus, dating from the early second century.
- Aulus Vallius Eutych[...], a worker named in an inscription from Ostia in Latium, dating from the early part of the second century.
- Lucius Vallius L. f. Auctus, one of the seviri Augustales, buried at Aquileia, along with his wife, the freedwoman Fructuosa, and Didyme, a young woman aged fifteen, in a tomb dating from the first half of the second century.
- Vallius, a centurion in the seventh cohort of the praetorian guard, named in an inscription from Rome, dating from the early or middle part of the second century.
- Lucius Vallius, one of the seviri Augustales at Lucus Feroniae in Etruria, named in a second-century inscription.
- Vallia L. l., a freedwoman named in a sepulchral inscription from Argyruntum in Dalmatia, dating from the second or third century.
- Lucius Vallius Solon, built a gate at Rome in honour of Silvanus, dedicated on the Kalends of Aprilis, AD 111.
- Lucius Vallius L. l. Phoebus, a freedman serving as one of the magistrates of the neighborhood known as "capitis Canteri", part of the thirteenth region of Rome, in AD 136.
- Vallius, a centurion mentioned in an inscription from Rome, dating between AD 152 and 156.
- Vallius Heraclida, a priest at Ostia, according to an inscription dating from the latter half of the second century.
- Gaius Vallius Postumus, patron of the colony of Gaulus in Sicily. His son, Marcus Vallius Rufus, dedicated a monument, dating from the latter part of the second century, and paid for by the municipal treasury, in his memory.
- Marcus Vallius C. f. Rufus, dedicated a monument at Gaulus, dating from the latter part of the second century, and paid for by the municipal treasury, in memory of his father, Gaius Vallius Postumus, late patron of the city.
- Gaius Vallius Maximianus, governor of various provinces during the reign of Marcus Aurelius, including Macedonia, Lusitania, and Mauretania Tingitana. He made an offering to the local gods at Volubilis in Mauretania, and granted Roman citizenship to those who had earned it. He was honored with inscriptions at Italica and Singilia Barba in Hispania Baetica, dating from AD 177 or 178.
- Vallius Primitivus, buried at Salona in Dalmatia, in a tomb dating between the late second century and the middle of the third.
- Vallia Latia, together with Lucius Vallius Lucanus, among a number of persons named in an inscription from Aquileia, dating from the last quarter of the second century. Also named in the same inscription is a Publius Vallius Successus.
- Lucius Vallius Lucanus, together with Vallia Latia, among a number of persons named in an inscription from Aquileia, dating from the last quarter of the second century. Also named in the same inscription is a Publius Vallius Successus.
- Publius Vallius Successus, one of a number of persons named in an inscription from Aquileia, dating from the last quarter of the second century. Also named in the same inscription are Vallia Latia and Lucius Vallius Lucanus.
- Gaius Vallius C. f. Scribonianus, one of the decurions at Carnuntum in Pannonia Superior, was buried in a tomb dating from the reign of Caracalla, built by order of the municipal officials, and dedicated by his daughter, Vallia Censorina.
- Vallia C. f. C. n. Censorina, dedicated a tomb at Carnuntum, dating from the reign of Caracalla, which had been decreed by the municipal duumvirs, for her father, Gaius Vallius Scribonianus.
- Gaius Vallius C. f. Pollianus, a soldier serving in the century of Priscianus, in the twelfth urban cohort at Rome, in AD 198.
- Quintus Vallius Caelestinus, a soldier serving in the century of Aelius Torquatus, in the fifth cohort of the vigiles at Rome in AD 210.

=== Undated Valii ===
- Vallia, buried at Ostia, in a tomb built by the freedman Aulus Cominius Artemas.
- Vallia, built and maintained a tomb at Bulla Regia in Africa Proconsularis for Lucius Vallius Sebinus, perhaps her father, out of the money left to her. He was buried alongside the flamen Gaius Scribonius Fortunatus.
- Vallius, named in an undated sepulchral inscription from Salona.
- Vallius Aemilianus, mentioned together with Vallius Hospes and Vallius Protasius in an inscription from Thamugadi in Numidia, listing various municipal officers and other prominent citizens. A flamen named Vallius Candidus is named earlier in the inscription.
- Quintus Vallius Amemptus, a potter whose maker's mark has been found on pottery from Vasio in Gallia Narbonensis.
- Vallia Ɔ. l. Anthusa, a freedwoman named in an inscription from Rome, along with the freedman Titus Vallius Mocetius, and the freedwomen Vallia Rufa and Vallia Hilara.
- Vallius Aper, made an offering to the local god at the site of modern Baltar in Galicia, formerly part of Hispania Tarraconensis.
- Lucius Vallius Atilianus, built a tomb at Arelate in Gallia Narbonensis for his grandmother, the flaminica Julia Tertullina.
- Vallia Beronice, buried at Tedusia in Gallia Narbonensis. She had a son named Generosus.
- Vallius Candidus, one of the flamines at Thamugadi. The same inscription mentions persons named Vallius Hospes, Vallius Aemilianus, and Vallius Protasius, consecutively, indicating that they were related and contemporaries of Candidus.
- Lucius Vallius Firmus, buried at Castellum Tidditanorum in Numidia, aged seventy-five.
- Lucius Vallius Flavinus, one of those chosen to serve as a priest by the officials Gaius Julius Docimus and Publius Marcius Romanus at Ostia.
- Vallia Fortunata, built a tomb at Rome for her young son, Lucius Julius Vestalis.
- Vallia T. Ɔ. l. Hilara, a freedwoman named in an inscription from Rome, along with the freedman Titus Vallius Mocetius, and the freedwomen Vallia Anthusa and Vallia Rufa.
- Vallius Hospes, named together with Vallius Aemilianus and Vallius Protasius in an inscription from Thamagudi, naming the municipal officers and other important citizens. The three were presumably related, and a Vallius Candidus is mentioned as a flamen in the same inscription. Another section indicates that Hospes had been one of the municipal duumvirs.
- Lucius Vallius Lucensis, dedicated a tomb at Rome for his mother, Trophima.
- Vallius Lyricus, built a family sepulchre at Vasio.
- Vallia Marcella, together with one Felix, perhaps her father, built a tomb at Rome for her mother, Vitellia Erotis. The inscription is suspect, and may be modern.
- Vallius Maximus, made an offering to the local gods at the site of modern A Pobra de Trives, formerly part of Hispania Tarraconensis.
- Gaius Vallius M. f. Maximus, buried in a family sepulchre at Pola in Venetia and Histria.
- Titus Vallius T. l. Mocetius, a freedman and locularius, or purse maker, named in an inscription from Rome, along with the freedwomen Vallia Anthusa, Vallia Hilara, and Vallia Rufa.
- Marcus Vallius Montanus, buried at Narbo in Gallia Narbonensis.
- Lucius Vallius Ossucu[...], buried at Rome, in a family sepulchre together with the freedwoman Curtia Ca[...].
- Lucius Vallius L. l. Pamph[...], a freedman buried at Rome, along with the freedwoman Valeria M[...].
- Lucius Vallius Proculus, a potter whose maker's mark was found on pottery belonging to the estate of one Faustina at Rome. Probably the same as Lucius Vallius Proclus, whose work was found at Ostia.
- Valerius Protasius, named together with Vallius Hospes and Vallius Aemilianus in an inscription listing the municipal officials of Thamagudi, along with other important citizens. A flamen named Vallius Candidus is listed in another portion of the inscription.
- Quintus Vallius L. f. Repertus, buried at the site of modern Berre-l'Étang, formerly part of Gallia Narbonensis, in a tomb built by his heirs.
- Vallia T. l. Rufa, a freedwoman named in an inscription from Rome, along with the freedman Titus Vallius Mocetius, and the freedwomen Vallia Anthusa and Vallia Hilara.
- Gaius Vallius Scipio, a potter whose maker's mark has been found on pottery from Salona and Spalatum in Dalmatia, and Valentia in Sardinia and Corsica.
- Lucius Vallius L. f. Sebinus, buried at Bulla Regia, in the same tomb as the flamen Gaius Scribonius Fortunatus. A woman named Vallia, perhaps his daughter, built and cared for Sebinus' tomb out of the money left to her.
- Vallius Severus, named in an inscription recording an offering to a local god at the site of modern O Saviñao in Galicia, formerly part of Hispania Tarraconensis.
- Vallia Urbica, buried at Narbo, in a tomb built by her husband, Saturninus.

== See also ==
- List of Roman gentes

== Bibliography ==
- Lucius Annaeus Seneca (Seneca the Elder), Controversiae.
- Lucius Cassius Dio, Roman History.
- Herbert Bloch, "The Roman Brick-stamps Not Published in Volume XV 1 of Corpus Inscriptionum Latinarum" in Harvard Studies in Classical Philology, vols. LVI, LVII (1947).
- René Cagnat et alii, L'Année épigraphique (The Year in Epigraphy, abbreviated AE), Presses Universitaires de France (1888–present).
- Dictionary of Greek and Roman Biography and Mythology, William Smith, ed., Little, Brown and Company, Boston (1849).
- Epigraphica, Rivista Italiana di Epigrafia (1939–present).
- Stéphane Gsell, Inscriptions Latines de L'Algérie (Latin Inscriptions from Algeria), Edouard Champion, Paris (1922–present).
- Wilhelm Henzen, Ephemeris Epigraphica: Corporis Inscriptionum Latinarum Supplementum (Journal of Inscriptions: Supplement to the Corpus Inscriptionum Latinarum, abbreviated EE), Institute of Roman Archaeology, Rome (1872–1913).
- Inscriptiones Italiae (Inscriptions from Italy), Rome (1931–present).
- Theodor Mommsen et alii, Corpus Inscriptionum Latinarum (The Body of Latin Inscriptions, abbreviated CIL), Berlin-Brandenburgische Akademie der Wissenschaften (1853–present).
- Paul von Rohden, Elimar Klebs, & Hermann Dessau, Prosopographia Imperii Romani (The Prosopography of the Roman Empire, abbreviated PIR), Berlin (1898).
- Anna and Jaroslav Šašel, Inscriptiones Latinae quae in Iugoslavia inter annos MCMXL et MCMLX repertae et editae sunt (Inscriptions from Yugoslavia Found and Published between 1940 and 1960), Ljubljana (1963–1986).
