= Remoulins =

- Commune
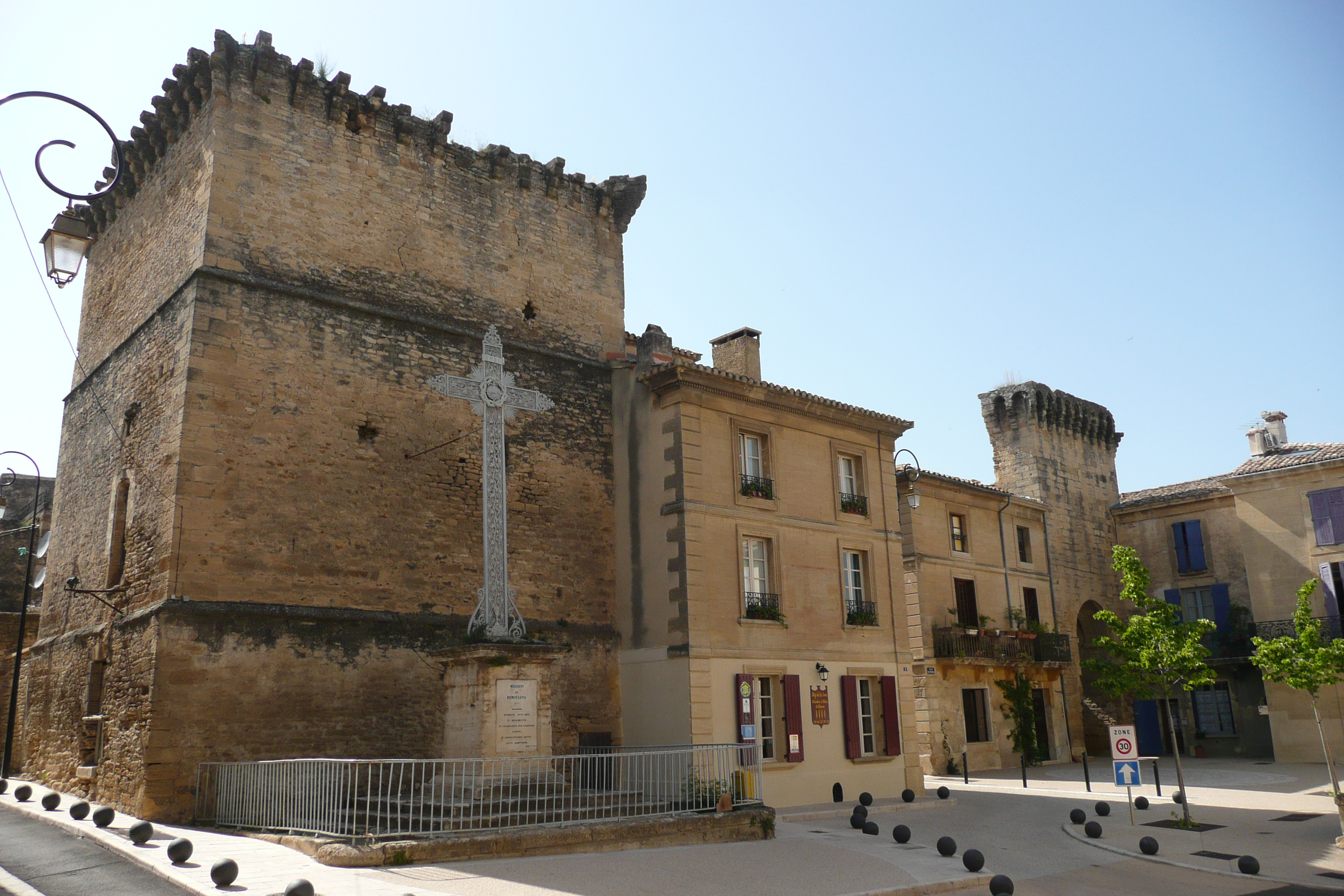
- Old town walls

- Coat of arms
- Location of Remoulins
- Location within France Location within Occitanie
- Coordinates: 43°56′25″N 4°33′52″E
- Country: France
- Region: Occitania
- Department: Gard
- Arrondissement: Nîmes
- Canton: Redessan
- Intercommunality: Pont du Gard

Government
  - Mayor (2020–2026): Nicolas Cartailler
- Area^{1}: 8.24 km^{2} (3.18 sq mi)
- Elevation: 27 m (89 ft)
- Highest elevation: 122 m (400 ft)
- Lowest elevation: 6 m (20 ft)
- Population (2023): 2,278
  - Density: 276/km^{2} (716/sq mi)
- Time zone: UTC+01:00 (CET)
  - Summer (DST): UTC+02:00 (CEST)
- INSEE/Postal code: 30212 /30210
- ^{1} French Land Register data, which excludes lakes, ponds, glaciers > 1 km^{2} (0.386 sq mi or 247 acres) and river estuaries.

Remoulins (French pronunciation: [ʁəmulɛ̃]; Occitan: Remolins) is a commune in the Gard department in southern France.

The town lies on the River Gardon or Gard, and is a short distance downstream of the Roman aqueduct Pont du Gard, in nearby Vers-Pont-du-Gard.

The current bridge over the Gardon in the town itself was completed in 1994, the successor to two previous suspension bridges. The remains of the first, built in 1830 by the Seguin brothers, are visible on the left bank.

== Population ==
Historical population
Year	Pop.	±% p.a.
1968	1,752	—
1975	1,898	+1.15%
1982	1,845	−0.40%
1990	1,771	−0.51%
1999	1,996	+1.34%
2007	2,338	+2.00%
2012	2,356	+0.15%
2017	2,281	−0.64%
2023	2,278	−0.02%
Source: INSEE

== Transport ==
Remoulins has a train station. However, no passenger trains are currently scheduled to stop there.

== See also ==
- Communes of the Gard department
