= Cabrières =

Cabrières is the name or part of the name of several communes in France:

- Cabrières, Gard, in the Gard department
- Cabrières, Hérault, in the Hérault department
- Cabrières-d'Aigues, in the Vaucluse department
- Cabrières-d'Avignon, in the Vaucluse department
