= Sernhac =

- Commune
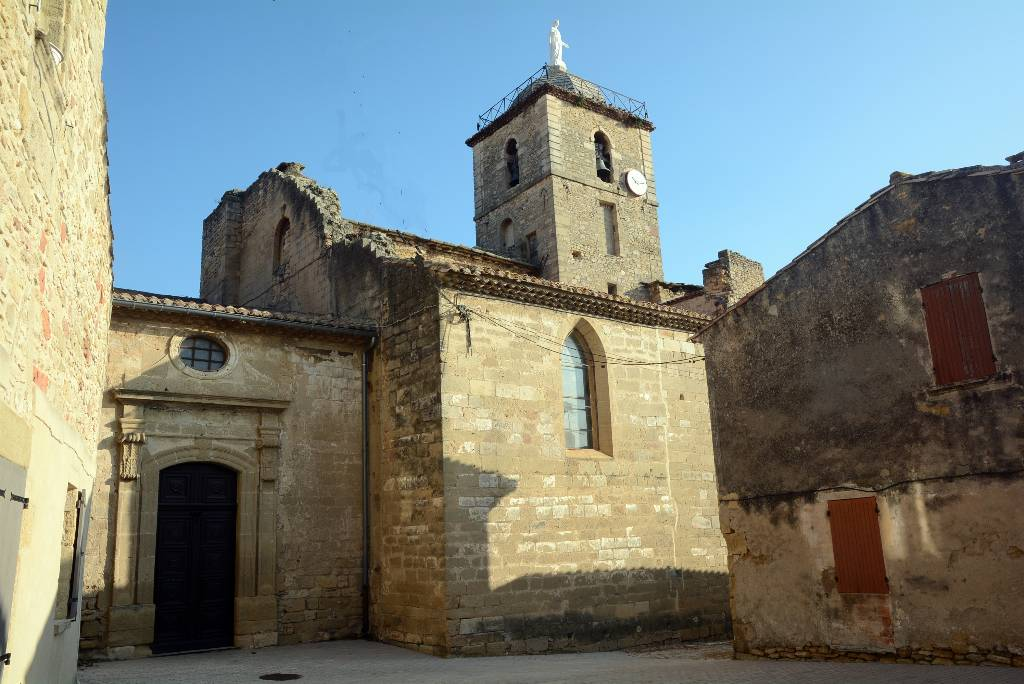
- The church of Saint-Sauveur in Sernhac

- Coat of arms
- Location of Sernhac
- Location within France Location within Occitanie
- Coordinates: 43°54′44″N 4°33′10″E
- Country: France
- Region: Occitania
- Department: Gard
- Arrondissement: Nîmes
- Canton: Redessan
- Intercommunality: CA Nîmes Métropole

Government
  - Mayor (2020–2026): Gaël Dupret
- Area^{1}: 8.93 km^{2} (3.45 sq mi)
- Elevation: 50 m (160 ft)
- Highest elevation: 155 m (509 ft)
- Lowest elevation: 12 m (39 ft)
- Population (2023): 1,819
  - Density: 204/km^{2} (528/sq mi)
- Time zone: UTC+01:00 (CET)
  - Summer (DST): UTC+02:00 (CEST)
- INSEE/Postal code: 30317 /30210
- ^{1} French Land Register data, which excludes lakes, ponds, glaciers > 1 km^{2} (0.386 sq mi or 247 acres) and river estuaries.

Sernhac is a commune in the Gard department in southern France.

== Population ==
Historical population
Year	Pop.	±% p.a.
1968	903	—
1975	870	−0.53%
1982	899	+0.47%
1990	1,155	+3.18%
1999	1,226	+0.67%
2007	1,440	+2.03%
2012	1,730	+3.74%
2017	1,755	+0.29%
2023	1,819	+0.60%
Source: INSEE

== See also ==
- Communes of the Gard department
- Costières de Nîmes AOC
