= Meynes =

- Commune
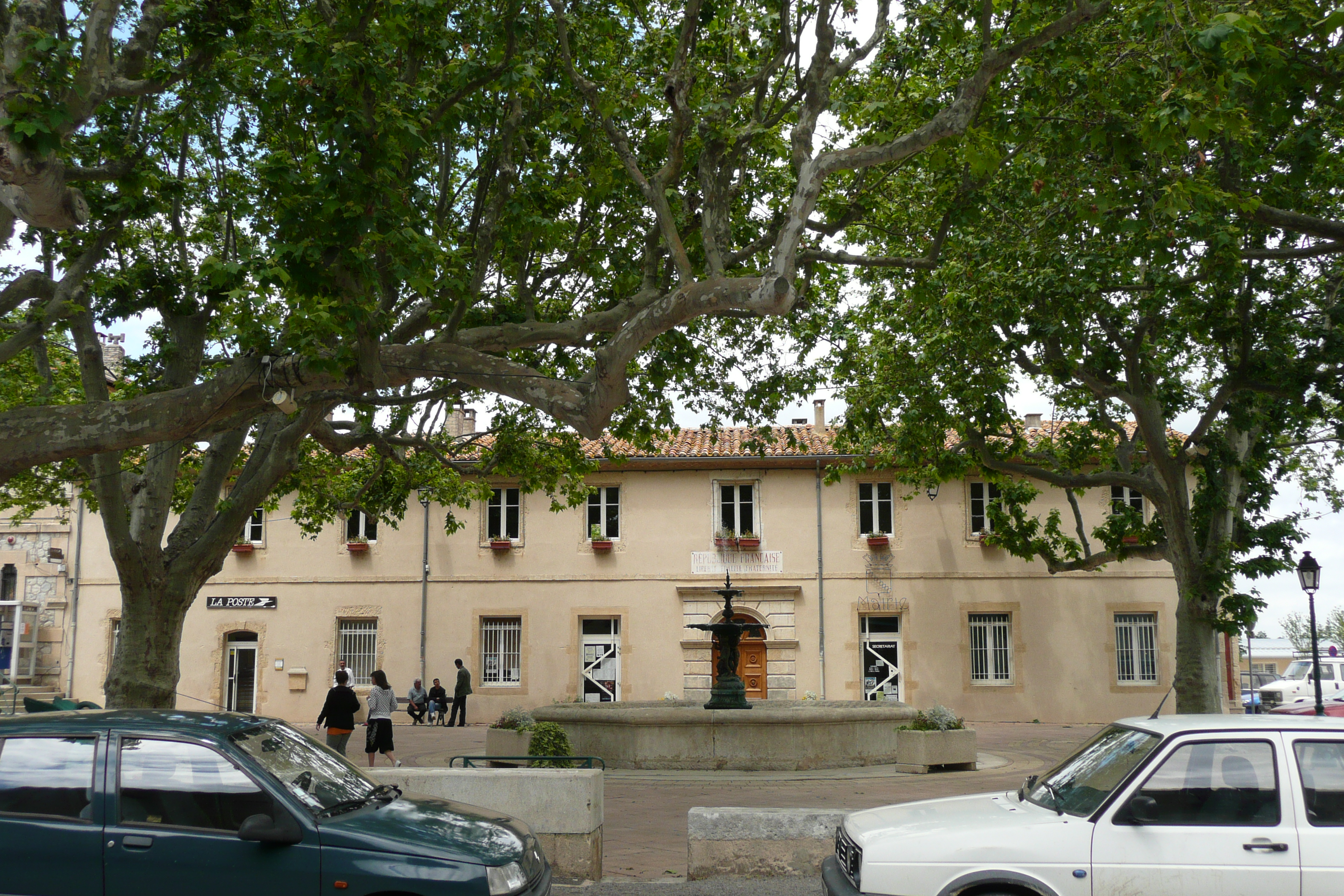
- Town hall

- Coat of arms
- Location of Meynes
- Location within France Location within Occitanie
- Coordinates: 43°52′59″N 4°33′43″E
- Country: France
- Region: Occitania
- Department: Gard
- Arrondissement: Nîmes
- Canton: Redessan
- Intercommunality: Pont du Gard

Government
  - Mayor (2020–2026): Fabrice Fournier
- Area^{1}: 16.66 km^{2} (6.43 sq mi)
- Elevation: 30 m (98 ft)
- Highest elevation: 78 m (256 ft)
- Lowest elevation: 11 m (36 ft)
- Population (2023): 2,597
  - Density: 155.9/km^{2} (403.7/sq mi)
- Time zone: UTC+01:00 (CET)
  - Summer (DST): UTC+02:00 (CEST)
- INSEE/Postal code: 30166 /30840
- ^{1} French Land Register data, which excludes lakes, ponds, glaciers > 1 km^{2} (0.386 sq mi or 247 acres) and river estuaries.

Meynes (French pronunciation: [mɛn]) is a commune in the Gard department in southern France.

== Geography ==
=== Climate ===
Meynes has a hot-summer Mediterranean climate (Köppen climate classification Csa). The average annual temperature in Meynes is 15.0 °C (59.0 °F). The average annual rainfall is 734.5 mm (28.92 in) with September as the wettest month. The temperatures are highest on average in July, at around 24.4 °C (75.9 °F), and lowest in January, at around 6.6 °C (43.9 °F). The highest temperature ever recorded in Meynes was 43.5 °C (110.3 °F) on 28 June 2019; the coldest temperature ever recorded was −11.0 °C (12.2 °F) on 15 January 1985.

Climate data for Meynes (1981−2010 normals, extremes 1966−2020)
Month	Jan	Feb	Mar	Apr	May	Jun	Jul	Aug	Sep	Oct	Nov	Dec	Year
Record high °C (°F)	21.0 (69.8)	25.7 (78.3)	29.4 (84.9)	30.5 (86.9)	35.0 (95.0)	43.5 (110.3)	38.9 (102.0)	41.0 (105.8)	35.8 (96.4)	32.0 (89.6)	27.0 (80.6)	20.5 (68.9)	43.5 (110.3)
Mean daily maximum °C (°F)	10.8 (51.4)	12.3 (54.1)	16.1 (61.0)	19.0 (66.2)	23.6 (74.5)	27.9 (82.2)	31.0 (87.8)	30.5 (86.9)	25.8 (78.4)	20.8 (69.4)	14.5 (58.1)	11.1 (52.0)	20.3 (68.5)
Daily mean °C (°F)	6.6 (43.9)	7.6 (45.7)	10.7 (51.3)	13.4 (56.1)	17.6 (63.7)	21.5 (70.7)	24.4 (75.9)	24.0 (75.2)	20.0 (68.0)	15.8 (60.4)	10.3 (50.5)	7.2 (45.0)	15.0 (59.0)
Mean daily minimum °C (°F)	2.3 (36.1)	2.8 (37.0)	5.4 (41.7)	7.7 (45.9)	11.6 (52.9)	15.2 (59.4)	17.8 (64.0)	17.4 (63.3)	14.2 (57.6)	10.8 (51.4)	6.0 (42.8)	3.3 (37.9)	9.6 (49.3)
Record low °C (°F)	−11.0 (12.2)	−8.5 (16.7)	−7.5 (18.5)	−2.5 (27.5)	0.0 (32.0)	5.5 (41.9)	7.5 (45.5)	8.8 (47.8)	5.0 (41.0)	−1.0 (30.2)	−5.7 (21.7)	−9.0 (15.8)	−11.0 (12.2)
Average precipitation mm (inches)	63.2 (2.49)	45.8 (1.80)	42.5 (1.67)	67.5 (2.66)	56.9 (2.24)	36.1 (1.42)	30.3 (1.19)	41.3 (1.63)	104.9 (4.13)	104.2 (4.10)	80.0 (3.15)	61.8 (2.43)	734.5 (28.92)
Average precipitation days (≥ 1.0 mm)	5.5	5.1	4.8	7.0	6.0	4.0	2.7	3.4	5.2	7.4	7.0	6.4	64.5
Source: Météo-France

== Population ==
Historical population
Year	Pop.	±% p.a.
1968	1,045	—
1975	1,210	+2.12%
1982	1,329	+1.35%
1990	1,807	+3.92%
1999	2,084	+1.60%
2007	2,160	+0.45%
2012	2,402	+2.15%
2017	2,456	+0.45%
2023	2,597	+0.93%
Source: INSEE

== See also ==
- Communes of the Gard department
- Costières de Nîmes AOC
