= Lédenon =

- Commune
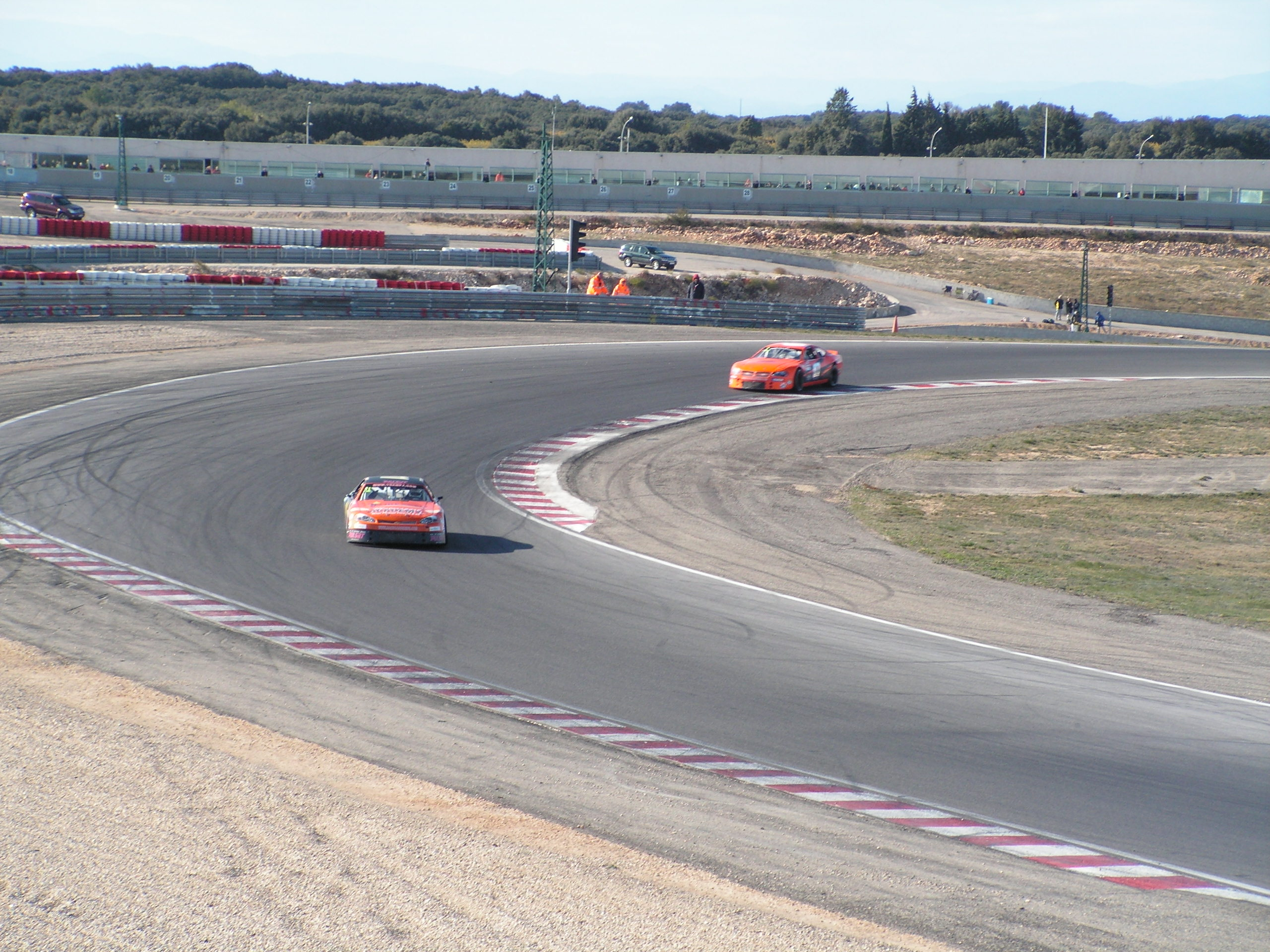
- The racetrack at Lédenon

- Coat of arms
- Location of Lédenon
- Location within France Location within Occitanie
- Coordinates: 43°54′59″N 4°30′35″E
- Country: France
- Region: Occitania
- Department: Gard
- Arrondissement: Nîmes
- Canton: Redessan
- Intercommunality: CA Nîmes Métropole

Government
  - Mayor (2020–2026): Frédéric Beaume
- Area^{1}: 19.44 km^{2} (7.51 sq mi)
- Elevation: 100 m (330 ft)
- Highest elevation: 214 m (702 ft)
- Lowest elevation: 65 m (213 ft)
- Population (2023): 1,685
  - Density: 86.68/km^{2} (224.5/sq mi)
- Time zone: UTC+01:00 (CET)
  - Summer (DST): UTC+02:00 (CEST)
- INSEE/Postal code: 30145 /30210
- ^{1} French Land Register data, which excludes lakes, ponds, glaciers > 1 km^{2} (0.386 sq mi or 247 acres) and river estuaries.

Lédenon (French pronunciation: [lednɔ̃]; Occitan: Ledenon) is a commune in the Gard department in southern France.

== Population ==
Historical population
Year	Pop.	±% p.a.
1968	417	—
1975	487	+2.24%
1982	780	+6.96%
1990	938	+2.33%
1999	1,130	+2.09%
2007	1,380	+2.53%
2012	1,400	+0.29%
2017	1,556	+2.14%
2023	1,685	+1.34%
Source: INSEE

== See also ==
- Communes of the Gard department
- Costières de Nîmes AOC
