= Saint-Gervasy =

- Commune
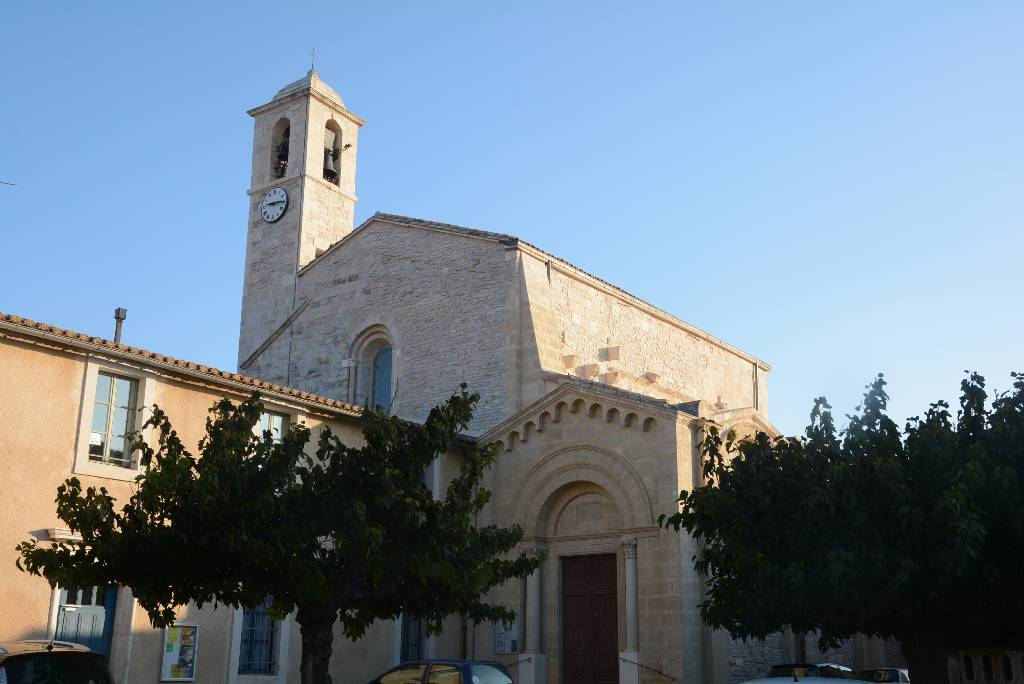
- The church of Saint-Gervasy
- Location of Saint-Gervasy
- Location within France Location within Occitanie
- Coordinates: 43°52′42″N 4°28′09″E
- Country: France
- Region: Occitania
- Department: Gard
- Arrondissement: Nîmes
- Canton: Redessan
- Intercommunality: CA Nîmes Métropole

Government
  - Mayor (2020–2026): Joël Vincent
- Area^{1}: 6.93 km^{2} (2.68 sq mi)
- Elevation: 64 m (210 ft)
- Highest elevation: 138 m (453 ft)
- Lowest elevation: 52 m (171 ft)
- Population (2023): 1,984
  - Density: 286/km^{2} (741/sq mi)
- Time zone: UTC+01:00 (CET)
  - Summer (DST): UTC+02:00 (CEST)
- INSEE/Postal code: 30257 /30320
- ^{1} French Land Register data, which excludes lakes, ponds, glaciers > 1 km^{2} (0.386 sq mi or 247 acres) and river estuaries.

Saint-Gervasy (French pronunciation: [sɛ̃ ʒɛʁvazi]; Occitan: Sent Gervasi) is a commune in the Gard department in southern France.

== Population ==
Historical population
Year	Pop.	±% p.a.
1968	495	—
1975	571	+2.06%
1982	791	+4.77%
1990	1,242	+5.80%
1999	1,476	+1.94%
2007	1,630	+1.25%
2012	1,738	+1.29%
2017	1,899	+1.79%
2023	1,984	+0.73%
Source: INSEE

== See also ==
- Communes of the Gard department
- Gervasius and Protasius
