= Canton of Redessan =

Coordinates: 43.83°N 4.50°E

The canton of Redessan is an administrative division of the Gard department, southern France. It was created at the French canton reorganisation which came into effect in March 2015. Its seat is in Redessan.

It consists of the following communes:

1. Argilliers
2. Bezouce
3. Cabrières
4. Castillon-du-Gard
5. Collias
6. Domazan
7. Estézargues
8. Fournès
9. Lédenon
10. Meynes
11. Montfrin
12. Pouzilhac
13. Redessan
14. Remoulins
15. Saint-Bonnet-du-Gard
16. Saint-Gervasy
17. Saint-Hilaire-d'Ozilhan
18. Sernhac
19. Théziers
20. Valliguières
21. Vers-Pont-du-Gard
