= Argilliers =

Commune in Occitanie, France

- Commune
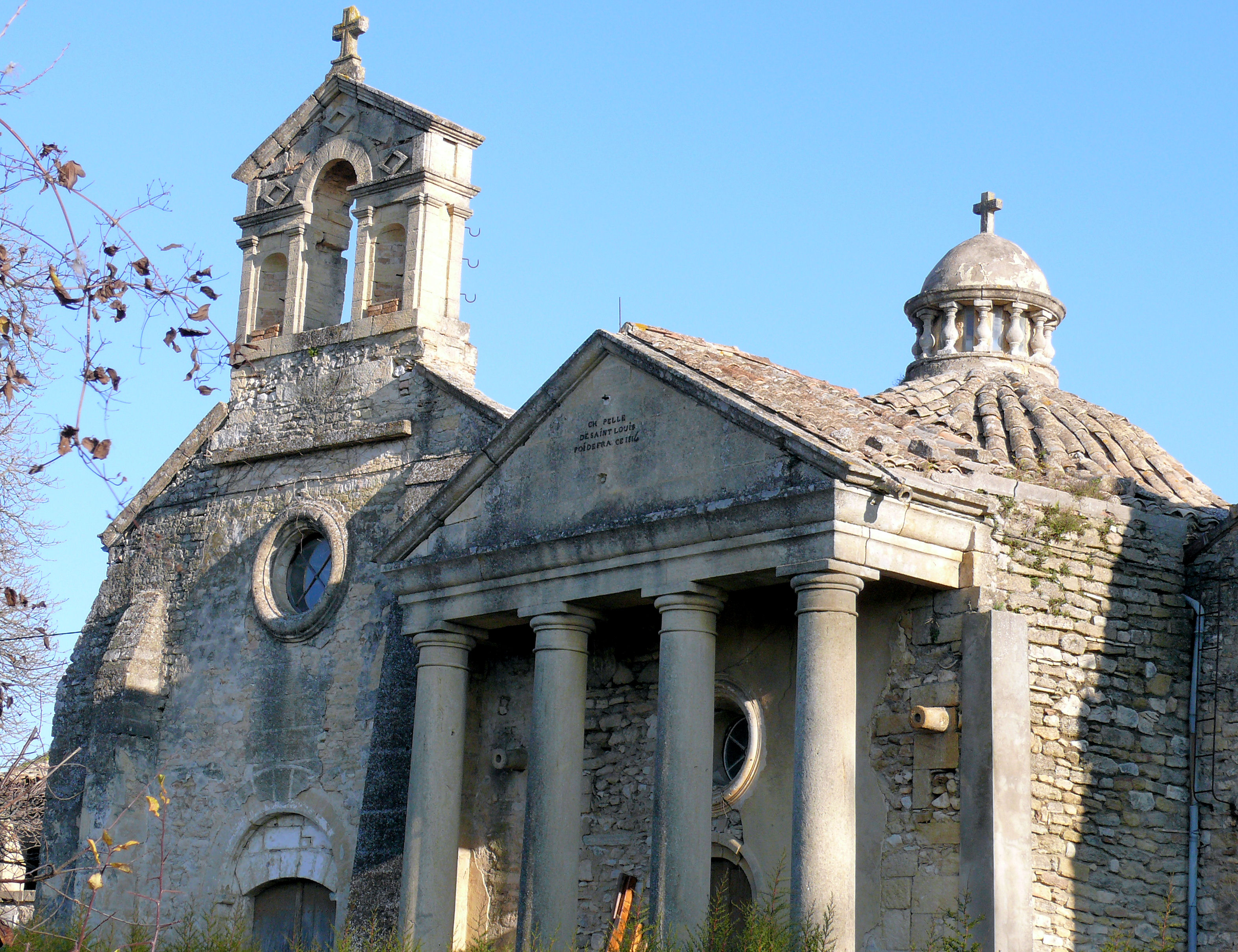
- The chapel of the Château de Castille in Argilliers

- Coat of arms
- Location of Argilliers
- Location within France Location within Occitanie
- Coordinates: 43°58′50″N 4°29′45″E
- Country: France
- Region: Occitania
- Department: Gard
- Arrondissement: Nîmes
- Canton: Redessan
- Intercommunality: CC Pont Gard

Government
  - Mayor (2020–2026): Laurent Boucarut
- Area^{1}: 6.67 km^{2} (2.58 sq mi)
- Elevation: 54 m (177 ft)
- Highest elevation: 200 m (660 ft)
- Lowest elevation: 37 m (121 ft)
- Population (2023): 436
  - Density: 65.4/km^{2} (169/sq mi)
- Time zone: UTC+01:00 (CET)
  - Summer (DST): UTC+02:00 (CEST)
- INSEE/Postal code: 30013 /30210
- ^{1} French Land Register data, which excludes lakes, ponds, glaciers > 1 km^{2} (0.386 sq mi or 247 acres) and river estuaries.

Argilliers (French pronunciation: [aʁʒilje]; Occitan: Argiliers) is a commune in the Gard department in southern France.

== Population ==
Historical population
Year	Pop.	±% p.a.
1968	74	—
1975	76	+0.38%
1982	96	+3.39%
1990	120	+2.83%
1999	193	+5.42%
2007	307	+5.97%
2012	424	+6.67%
2017	483	+2.64%
2023	436	−1.69%
Source: INSEE

== See also ==
- Communes of the Gard department
