= Redessan =

- Commune
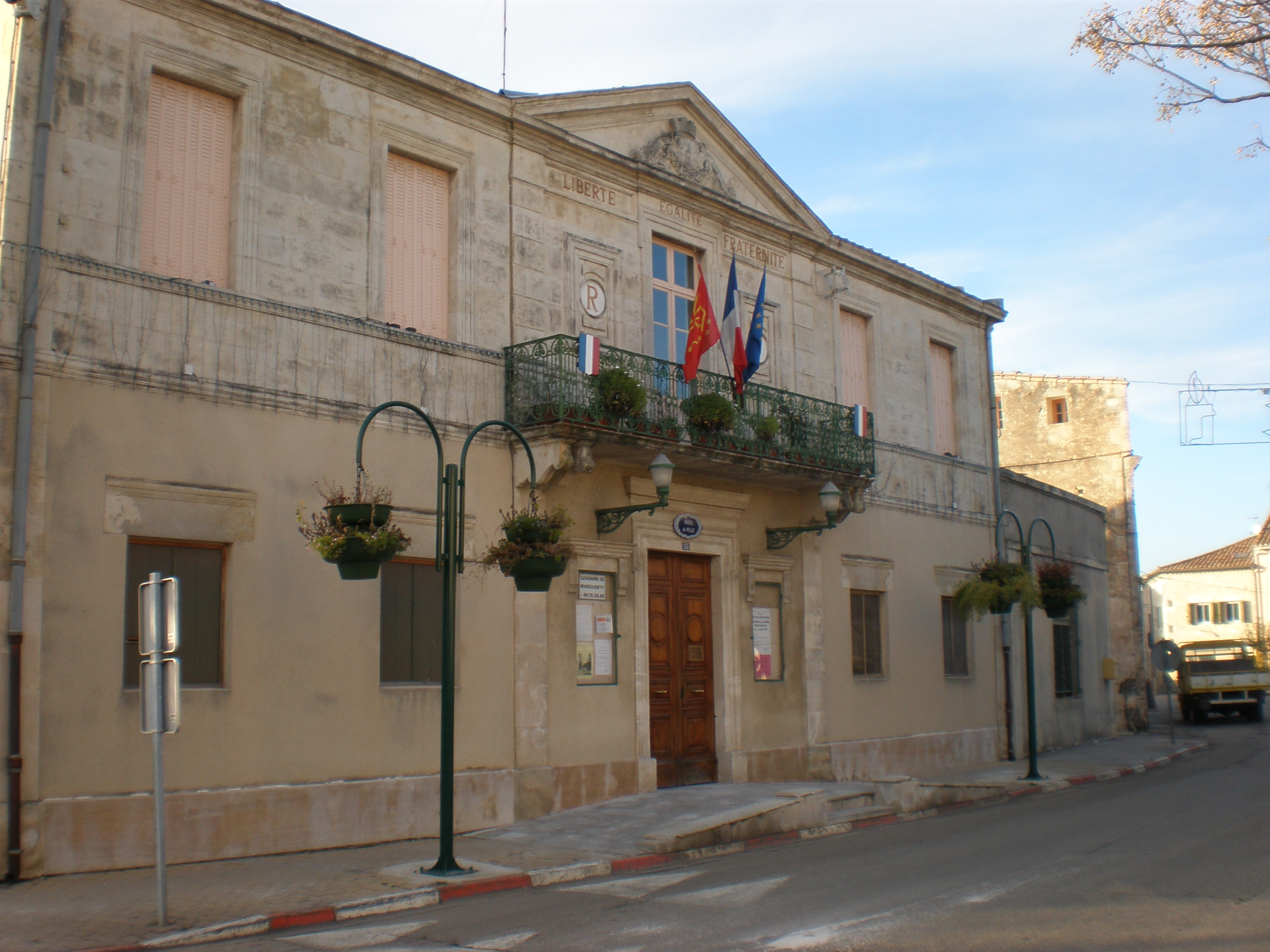
- Town hall

- Coat of arms
- Location of Redessan
- Location within France Location within Occitanie
- Coordinates: 43°49′59″N 4°29′51″E
- Country: France
- Region: Occitania
- Department: Gard
- Arrondissement: Nîmes
- Canton: Redessan
- Intercommunality: CA Nîmes Métropole

Government
  - Mayor (2020–2026): Fabienne Richard-Trinquier
- Area^{1}: 15.57 km^{2} (6.01 sq mi)
- Elevation: 56 m (184 ft)
- Highest elevation: 76 m (249 ft)
- Lowest elevation: 54 m (177 ft)
- Population (2023): 4,211
  - Density: 270.5/km^{2} (700.5/sq mi)
- Time zone: UTC+01:00 (CET)
  - Summer (DST): UTC+02:00 (CEST)
- INSEE/Postal code: 30211 /30129
- ^{1} French Land Register data, which excludes lakes, ponds, glaciers > 1 km^{2} (0.386 sq mi or 247 acres) and river estuaries.

Redessan (French pronunciation: [ʁədesɑ̃]; Provençal: Redeçan) is a commune in the Gard department in southern France.

== Population ==
Historical population
Year	Pop.	±% p.a.
1968	1,299	—
1975	1,602	+3.04%
1982	2,084	+3.83%
1990	2,233	+0.87%
1999	2,873	+2.84%
2007	3,247	+1.54%
2012	4,044	+4.49%
2017	4,115	+0.35%
2023	4,211	+0.39%
Source: INSEE

== See also ==
- Communes of the Gard department
- Costières de Nîmes AOC
