= Estézargues =

- Commune
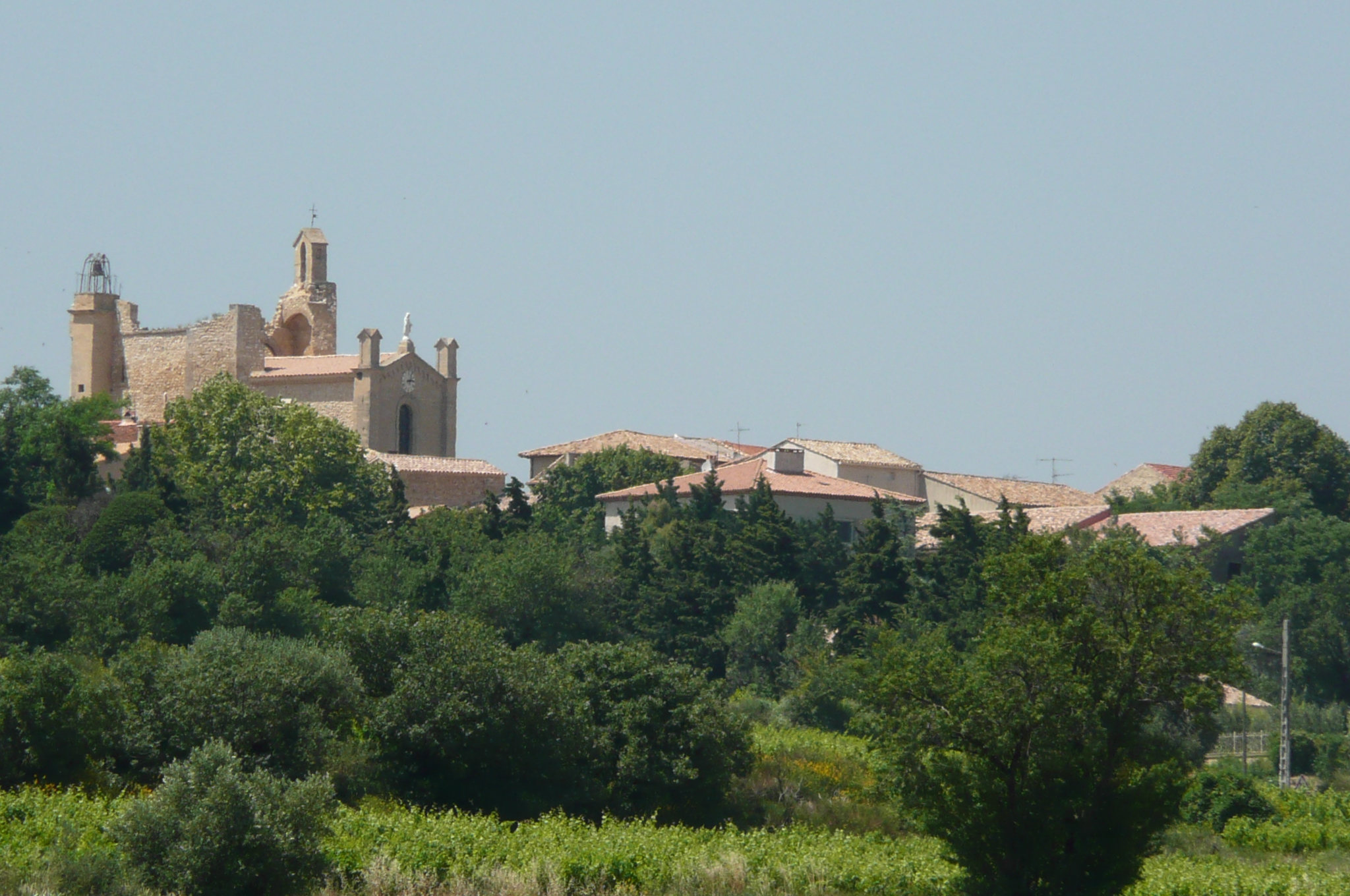
- A general view of Estézargues

- Coat of arms
- Location of Estézargues
- Location within France Location within Occitanie
- Coordinates: 43°56′28″N 4°38′13″E
- Country: France
- Region: Occitania
- Department: Gard
- Arrondissement: Nîmes
- Canton: Redessan
- Intercommunality: Pont du Gard

Government
  - Mayor (2020–2026): Martine Laguérie
- Area^{1}: 11.59 km^{2} (4.47 sq mi)
- Elevation: 135 m (443 ft)
- Highest elevation: 232 m (761 ft)
- Lowest elevation: 49 m (161 ft)
- Population (2023): 605
  - Density: 52.2/km^{2} (135/sq mi)
- Time zone: UTC+01:00 (CET)
  - Summer (DST): UTC+02:00 (CEST)
- INSEE/Postal code: 30107 /30390
- ^{1} French Land Register data, which excludes lakes, ponds, glaciers > 1 km^{2} (0.386 sq mi or 247 acres) and river estuaries.

Estézargues (French pronunciation: [ɛstezaʁɡ]; Occitan: Estesargues) is a commune in the Gard department in southern France.

== Population ==
Historical population
Year	Pop.	±% p.a.
1968	200	—
1975	213	+0.90%
1982	228	+0.98%
1990	276	+2.42%
1999	384	+3.74%
2007	440	+1.72%
2012	482	+1.84%
2017	579	+3.74%
2023	605	+0.73%
Source: INSEE

== See also ==
- Communes of the Gard department
