= Costières de Nîmes AOC =

French wine geographic appellation

Rhône wine
- Wine region
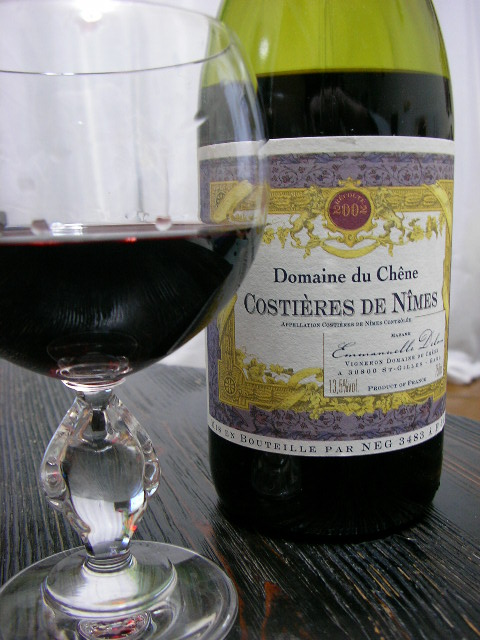
- Official name: Costières de Nîmes
- Type: Appelation d'origine contrôlé
- Year established: 1986
- Years of wine industry: Over 2,000
- Country: France
- Part of: Rhône Valley
- Other regions in Rhône Valley: Côtes du Rhône, right bank. Coteaux du Languedoc
- Climate region: Mediterranean
- Soil conditions: Quartzite pebble with alluvia
- Total area: Over 10,000
- Size of planted vineyards: 4,185
- Grapes produced: Red/rosé: Syrah, Grenache, Mourvèdre, Carignan, Cinsault. White: Grenache blanc, Marsanne, Roussanne, Clairette, Bourboulenc, Macabeo, Rolle
- Wine produced: Red, white, rosé

Costières de Nîmes (French pronunciation: [kɔstjɛʁ də nim]) is an Appellation d'Origine Contrôlée (AOC) for wines that are produced in an area between the ancient city of Nîmes and the western Rhône delta, in the French department of the Gard. Formerly part of the Languedoc region of France, as the wines more resemble those of the Rhône valley in character than of the Languedoc, it is now part of the Rhone wine area and administered by the Rhône Wine committee which has its headquarters in Avignon.

== History ==
Wines from the region have been produced for over two millennia and were consumed by the Greeks in pre-Roman times, making it one of the oldest vineyards in Europe. The area was settled by veterans of Julius Caesar's campaigns in Egypt, and bottles of Costières de Nîmes bear the symbol of the Roman settlement at Nîmes, a crocodile chained to a palm tree. According to a chart in the kitchen of the Palais des Papes in Avignon, many of the towns in what is now the Costieres de Nîmes region were the main suppliers of wine to the Popes of that era.

=== Change of name and regional affiliation ===
Formerly known as Costières du Gard, a VDQS, the wine achieved AOC status in 1986 and was renamed Costières de Nîmes 1989. In 1998 the growers' organization (the syndicate) requested that the appellation should be attached to the Rhône wine region as their wines are more reflective of the typical characteristics of Rhône wines than of the Languedoc region to which the area geographically belongs. INAO, the French authority which regulates the country's appellations, assigns each appellation to a regional committee which is in charge of approving wines from that appellation. This list is a legal text published by the French ministry of agriculture. The move of Costières de Nîmes to the regional committee of the Rhône valley was effected in the 19 July 2004 version of this list. Up until the version of 8 July 1998, which the 2004 version superseded, Costières de Nîmes was assigned to the regional committee of Languedoc-Roussillon. The immediately adjacent AOC of Clairette de Bellegarde remains listed as a Languedoc AOC.

== Geography ==
Between the low rocky hills and garrigue that mark the border of the Languedoc with the Provence, and the low sandy plain of the Camargue the Rhône delta, the soil is mostly a mixture of round pebbles ("galets") similar to Châteauneuf-du-Pape, and sandy alluvial deposit and red shale. The soil depth from 3 to 15 metres is largely responsible for the variations of style within this AOC.

The climate is Mediterranean, similar to that of the Rhône valley, but is characterised by its proximity to the coast and the sea breezes.

The wines are produced in selected parcels of the following 24 communes: Aubord, Beaucaire, Beauvoisin, Bellegarde, Bernis, Bezouce, Bouillargues, Le Cailar, Caissargues, Garons, Générac, Jonquières-Saint-Vincent, Lédenon, Manduel, Meynes, Milhaud, Gard, Nîmes, Redessan, Rodilhan, Saint-Gilles, Sernhac, Uchaud, Vauvert, and Vestric-et-Candiac.

== The wines ==
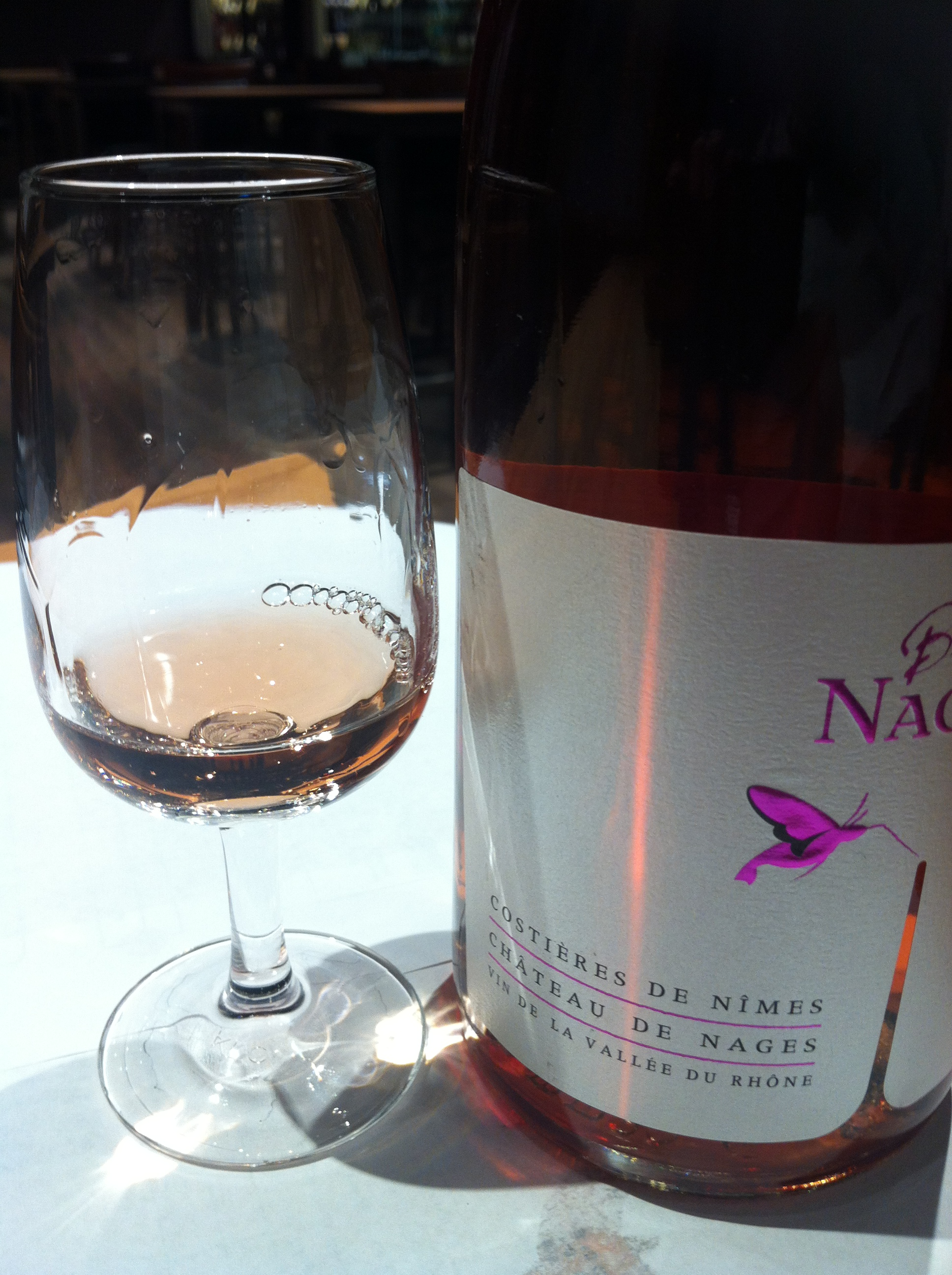
A rosé wine from the Costières de Nîmes AOC.

=== Red ===
The Costières de Nîmes produce mostly red wines, from Syrah and Mourvèdre together 20%, Grenache minimum of 25%, Carignan maximum 40%, Cinsault, maximum 40%. They are closer in style to Rhône wine than Languedoc wine and generally they are elegant, well balanced, lightly structured, with aromas of red fruit, blackberry, prune and black cherry. Some of the wines are rounder, more generous, with a higher level of tannins. The reds account for approximately 59% of the total production.

=== White ===
White wines account for about 4% of the AOC production. A small amount, approximately 5% of the total, of white wine is made from the Bourboulenc, Clairette blanc, Grenache blanc, Maccabéo, Rolle, Roussanne and Ugni blanc, maximum 30% varieties. The whites must be blended from a minimum of two varieties. Ugni blanc will be discontinued from the AOC with effect from and including the harvest of 2010. The whites are well balanced with aromas of flower and fruit, citrus, and occasionally apple and pear.

They can be consumed alone or as an accompaniment to seafood and grilled fish.

=== Rosé ===
Some rosé is made as a by-product from the production of red wines, with the same permitted percentages of grape varieties, with a possible maximum of 10% of white grapes from the allowed varieties for the white wines. These are light and dry, traditionally well balanced and delicate. Locally, it is often drunk with light meals of salads, pasta, and pizza. Rosé accounts for approximately 37% of the total production.

The minimum decreed alcohol content for red, white and rosé is 11%.

== Economy ==
The industry comprises 424 concerns which include 404 growers, 96 private wineries, 17 cooperative wineries, and 3 merchant/producers. Sales of the wines are achieved through supermarkets (46%), export (25%), direct sales (8%), bars, restaurants and hotels (8%), wholesale (7%), and wine shops (6%).

== See also ==
- List of Vins de Primeur
