= Domazan =

- Commune
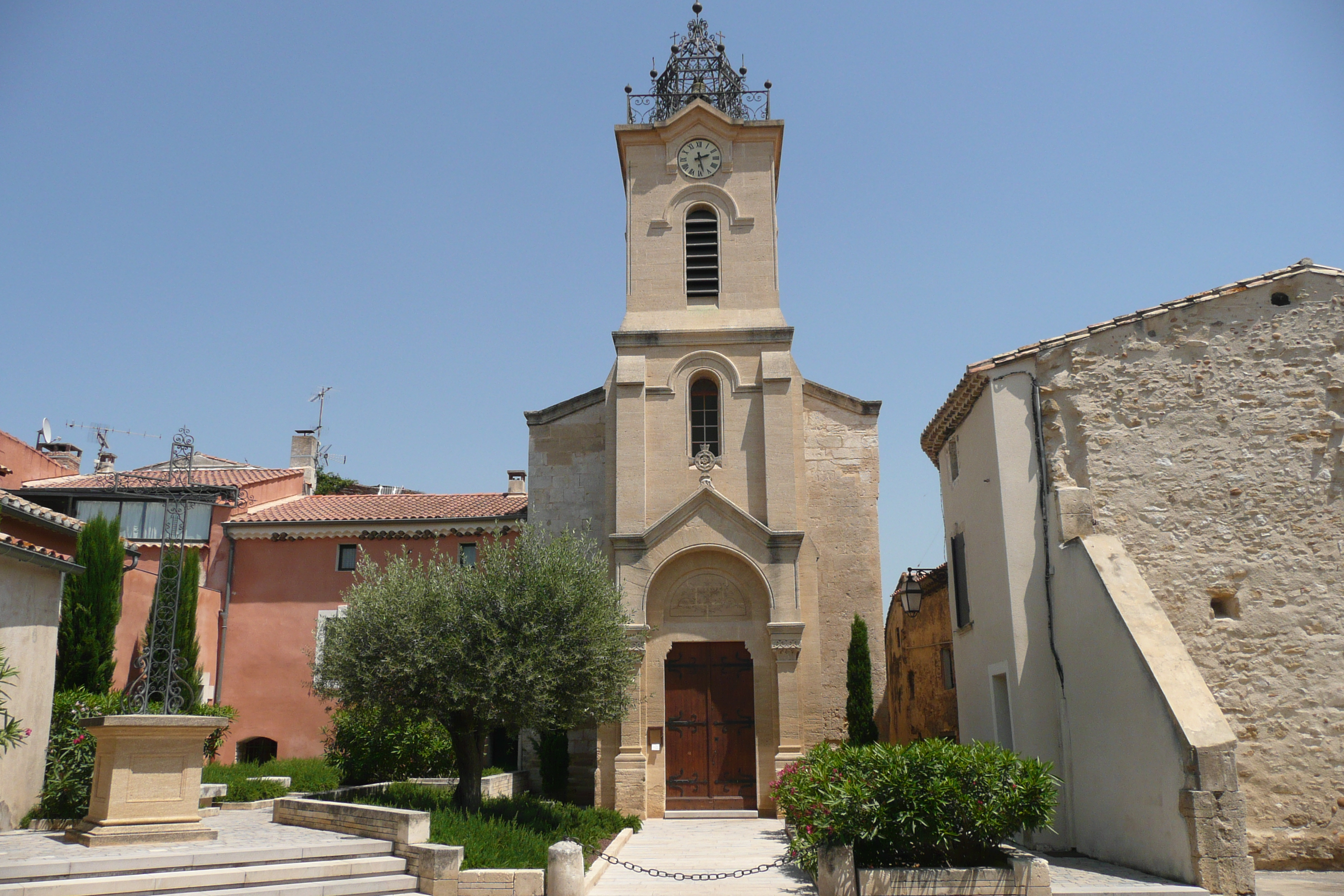
- The church of Domazan

- Coat of arms
- Location of Domazan
- Location within France Location within Occitanie
- Coordinates: 43°55′50″N 4°39′06″E
- Country: France
- Region: Occitania
- Department: Gard
- Arrondissement: Nîmes
- Canton: Redessan

Government
  - Mayor (2020–2026): Louis Donnet
- Area^{1}: 11.42 km^{2} (4.41 sq mi)
- Elevation: 75 m (246 ft)
- Highest elevation: 162 m (531 ft)
- Lowest elevation: 35 m (115 ft)
- Population (2023): 960
  - Density: 84/km^{2} (220/sq mi)
- Time zone: UTC+01:00 (CET)
  - Summer (DST): UTC+02:00 (CEST)
- INSEE/Postal code: 30103 /30390
- ^{1} French Land Register data, which excludes lakes, ponds, glaciers > 1 km^{2} (0.386 sq mi or 247 acres) and river estuaries.

Domazan (French pronunciation: [dɔmazɑ̃]; Occitan: Domasan) is a commune in the Gard department in southern France.

== Population ==
Historical population
Year	Pop.	±% p.a.
1968	432	—
1975	454	+0.71%
1982	513	+1.76%
1990	671	+3.41%
1999	740	+1.09%
2007	844	+1.66%
2012	925	+1.85%
2017	930	+0.11%
2023	960	+0.53%
Source: INSEE

== See also ==
- Communes of the Gard department
