= Montfrin =

- Commune
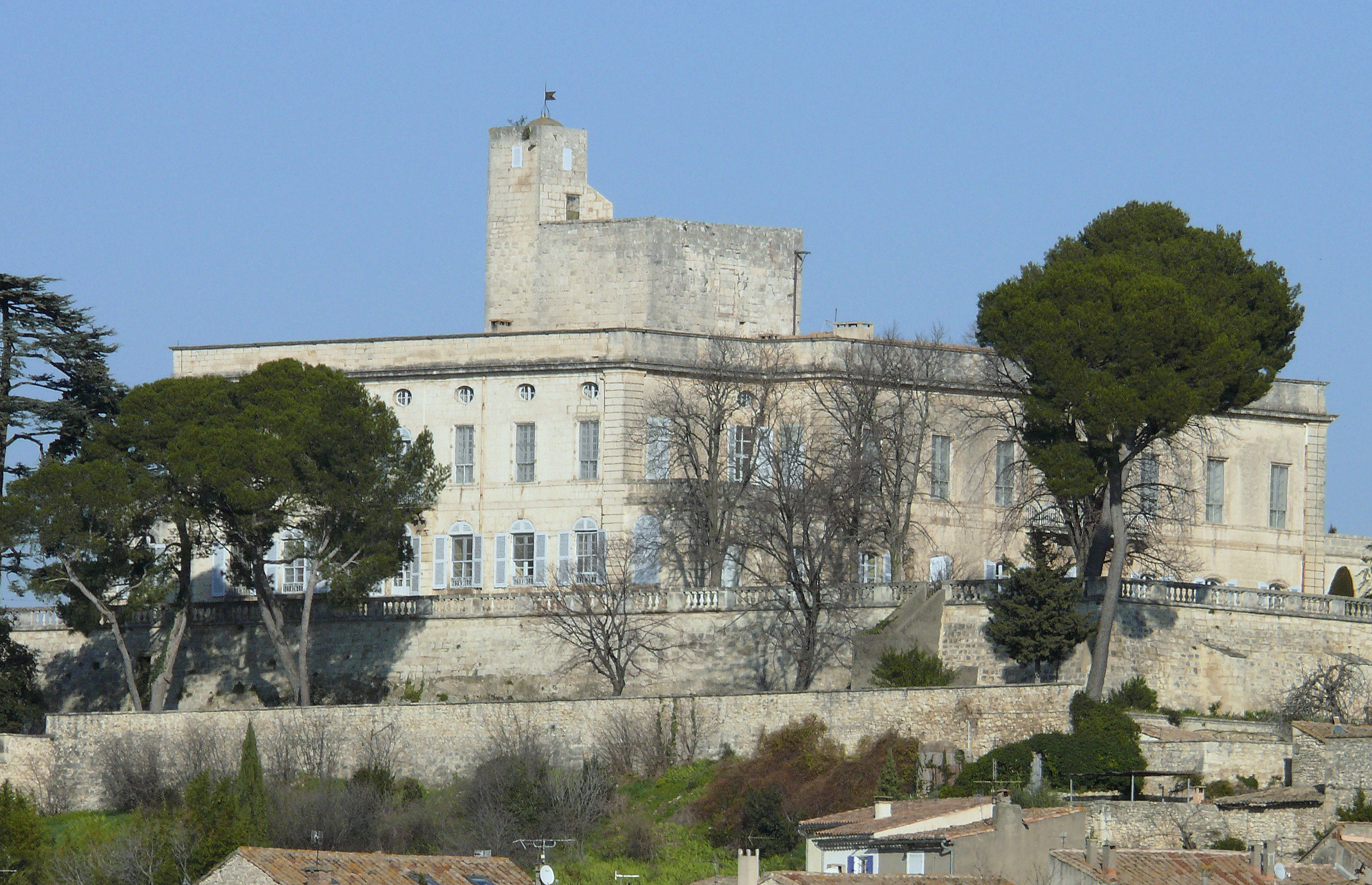
- Chateau

- Coat of arms
- Location of Montfrin
- Location within France Location within Occitanie
- Coordinates: 43°52′34″N 4°35′39″E
- Country: France
- Region: Occitania
- Department: Gard
- Arrondissement: Nîmes
- Canton: Redessan
- Intercommunality: Pont du Gard

Government
  - Mayor (2020–2026): Éric Tremoulet
- Area^{1}: 15.29 km^{2} (5.90 sq mi)
- Elevation: 21 m (69 ft)
- Highest elevation: 78 m (256 ft)
- Lowest elevation: 7 m (23 ft)
- Population (2023): 3,122
  - Density: 204.2/km^{2} (528.8/sq mi)
- Time zone: UTC+01:00 (CET)
  - Summer (DST): UTC+02:00 (CEST)
- INSEE/Postal code: 30179 /30490
- ^{1} French Land Register data, which excludes lakes, ponds, glaciers > 1 km^{2} (0.386 sq mi or 247 acres) and river estuaries.

Montfrin (French pronunciation: [mɔ̃fʁɛ̃]) is a commune in the Gard department in southern France.

== Population ==
The residents are called Montfrinois in French.

Historical population
Year	Pop.	±% p.a.
1968	2,055	—
1975	2,089	+0.23%
1982	2,404	+2.03%
1990	2,685	+1.39%
1999	2,934	+0.99%
2007	2,911	−0.10%
2012	3,175	+1.75%
2017	3,189	+0.09%
2023	3,122	−0.35%
Source: INSEE

== Geography ==
Montfrin is located between Nîmes and Avignon, 10 km (6.2 mi) from Pont du Gard. The Gardon flows through the commune.

== History ==
In Roman times, the place was called Mons Ferinus (mountain of the ferocious animals).

Charles Martel fought a battle there against the Saracens in 736, four years after the Battle of Tours.

The village has attracted celebrities during its history (including François I, Richelieu, Molière), and until the French Revolution, due to the presence of a "healing" spring, the spring of Fontcluse. A story says that the virtues of the spring were discovered by Charles Martel, who witnessed the healing of wounded soldiers after the battle.

== Personalities ==
- Keith Floyd until his death in 2009

== See also ==
- Communes of the Gard department
