= Bezouce =

Commune in Occitanie, France

- Commune
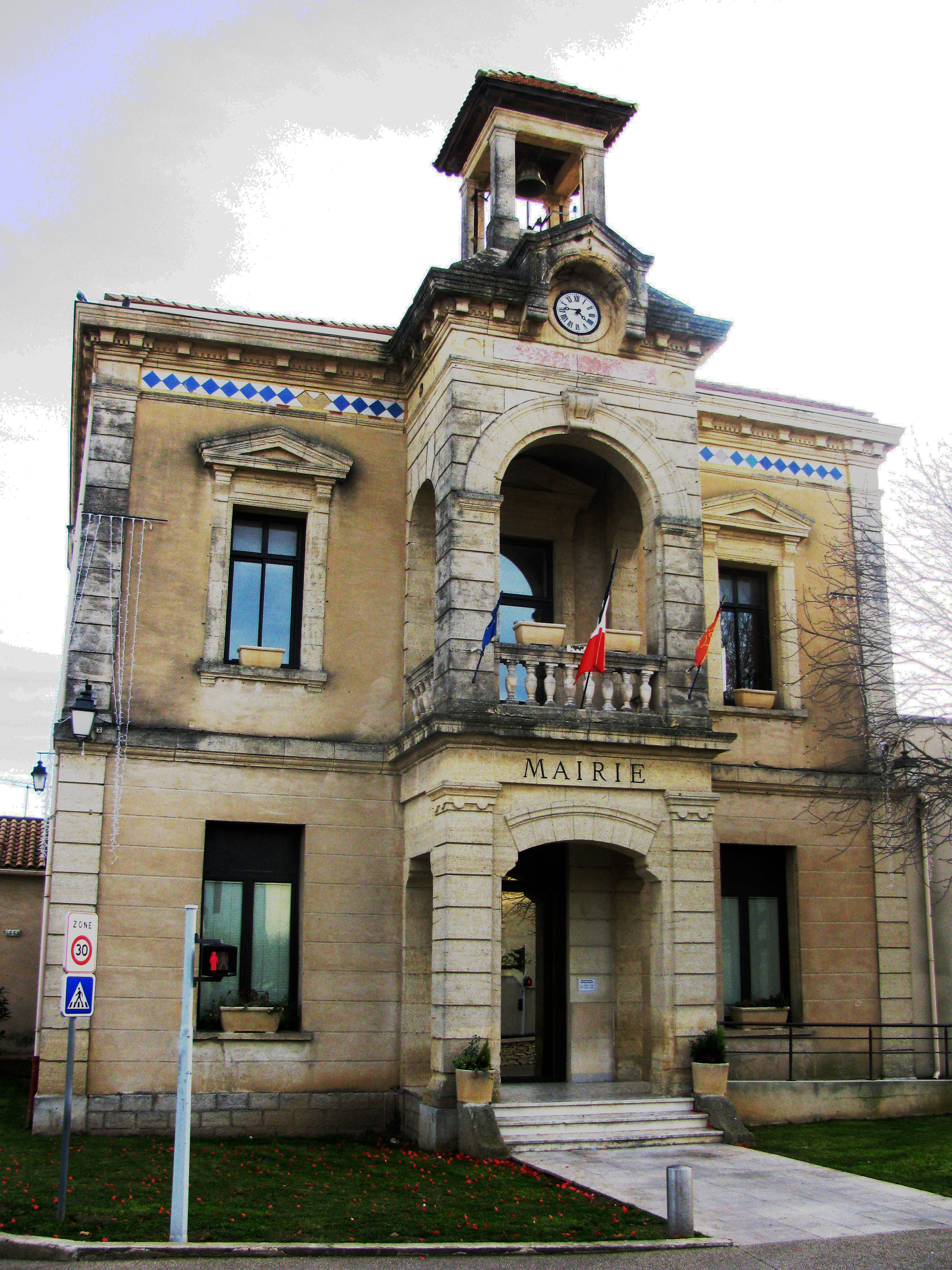
- The town hall of Bezouce

- Coat of arms
- Location of Bezouce
- Location within France Location within Occitanie
- Coordinates: 43°52′56″N 4°29′27″E
- Country: France
- Region: Occitania
- Department: Gard
- Arrondissement: Nîmes
- Canton: Redessan
- Intercommunality: CA Nîmes Métropole

Government
  - Mayor (2020–2026): Antoine Marcos
- Area^{1}: 12.29 km^{2} (4.75 sq mi)
- Elevation: 73 m (240 ft)
- Highest elevation: 139 m (456 ft)
- Lowest elevation: 56 m (184 ft)
- Population (2023): 2,348
  - Density: 191.0/km^{2} (494.8/sq mi)
- Time zone: UTC+01:00 (CET)
  - Summer (DST): UTC+02:00 (CEST)
- INSEE/Postal code: 30039 /30320
- ^{1} French Land Register data, which excludes lakes, ponds, glaciers > 1 km^{2} (0.386 sq mi or 247 acres) and river estuaries.

Bezouce (French pronunciation: [bəzus]; Occitan: Besoça) is a commune in the Gard department in southern France.

== Population ==
Historical population
Year	Pop.	±% p.a.
1968	681	—
1975	721	+0.82%
1982	1,280	+8.55%
1990	1,625	+3.03%
1999	1,950	+2.05%
2007	2,068	+0.74%
2012	2,164	+0.91%
2017	2,299	+1.22%
2023	2,348	+0.35%
Source: INSEE

== See also ==
- Costières de Nîmes AOC
- Communes of the Gard department
