= Théziers =

- Commune
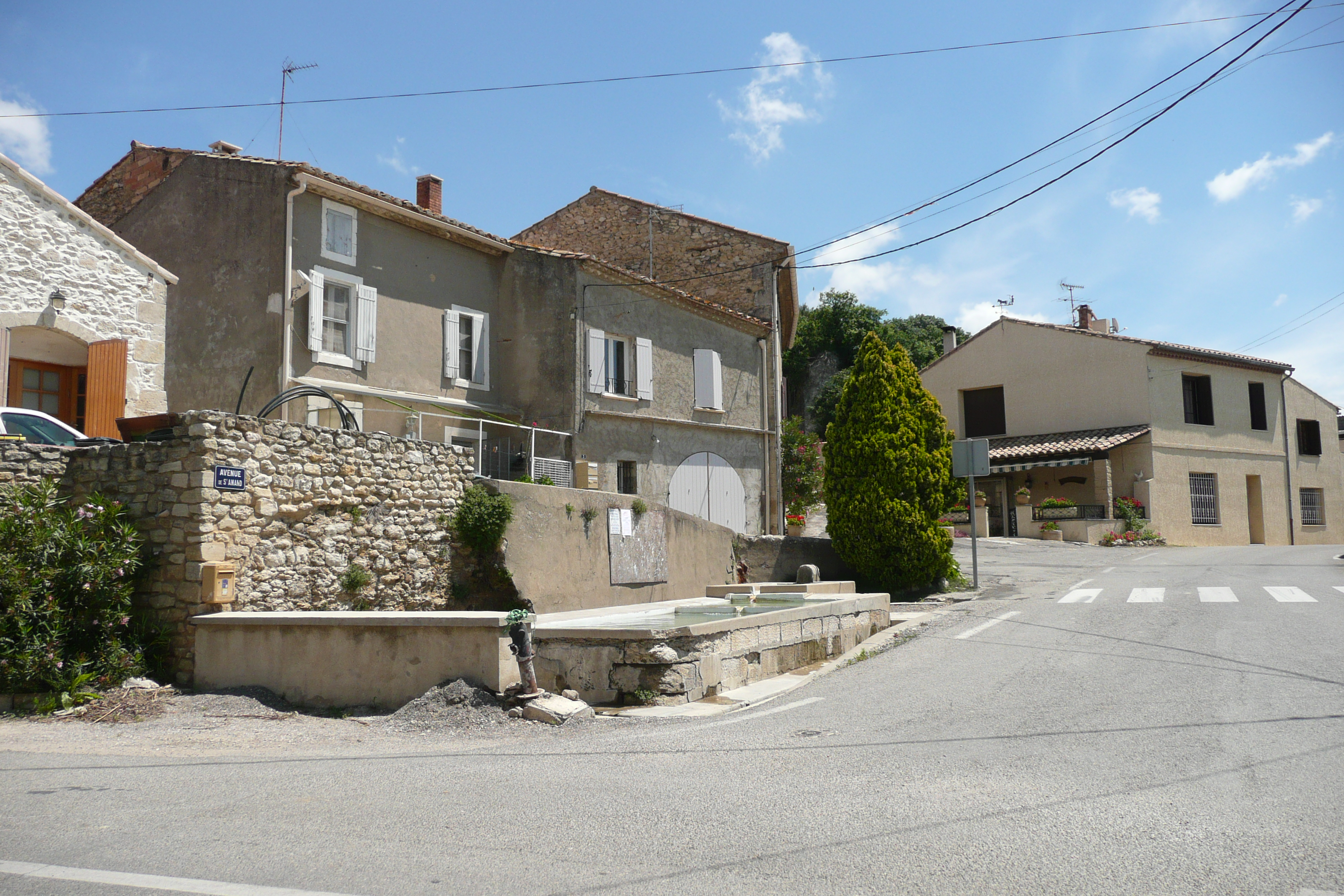
- A view of Théziers

- Coat of arms
- Location of Théziers
- Location within France Location within Occitanie
- Coordinates: 43°54′00″N 4°37′18″E
- Country: France
- Region: Occitania
- Department: Gard
- Arrondissement: Nîmes
- Canton: Redessan
- Intercommunality: Pont du Gard

Government
  - Mayor (2021–2026): Murielle Garcia-Favand
- Area^{1}: 11.34 km^{2} (4.38 sq mi)
- Elevation: 20 m (66 ft)
- Highest elevation: 129 m (423 ft)
- Lowest elevation: 10 m (33 ft)
- Population (2023): 1,087
  - Density: 95.86/km^{2} (248.3/sq mi)
- Time zone: UTC+01:00 (CET)
  - Summer (DST): UTC+02:00 (CEST)
- INSEE/Postal code: 30328 /30390
- ^{1} French Land Register data, which excludes lakes, ponds, glaciers > 1 km^{2} (0.386 sq mi or 247 acres) and river estuaries.

Théziers (French pronunciation: [tezje]; Occitan: Tesiers) is a commune in the Gard department in the Occitanie region in southern France.

== History ==
Théziers was founded in the 6th century BC by Greek colonists, who, after they had founded the coastal town of Marseille (Greek: Μασσαλία), advanced inland to found smaller colonies in the periphery. The ancient name of the town was Tedusia (Greek: Θεδουσία), under which the town was known during the Roman times. It was a fortified settlement situated on a hill, which was captured by the Celts during their invasions in the 2nd century BC. Gradually the Romans occupied the Gaul and expelled the Celts, while the settlement evolved as a Gallo-Roman village.

== Population ==
Historical population
Year	Pop.	±% p.a.
1968	678	—
1975	659	−0.41%
1982	674	+0.32%
1990	844	+2.85%
1999	883	+0.50%
2007	1,018	+1.79%
2012	1,091	+1.39%
2017	1,039	−0.97%
2023	1,087	+0.76%
Source: INSEE

== See also ==
- Communes of the Gard department
