= Vers-Pont-du-Gard =

- Commune
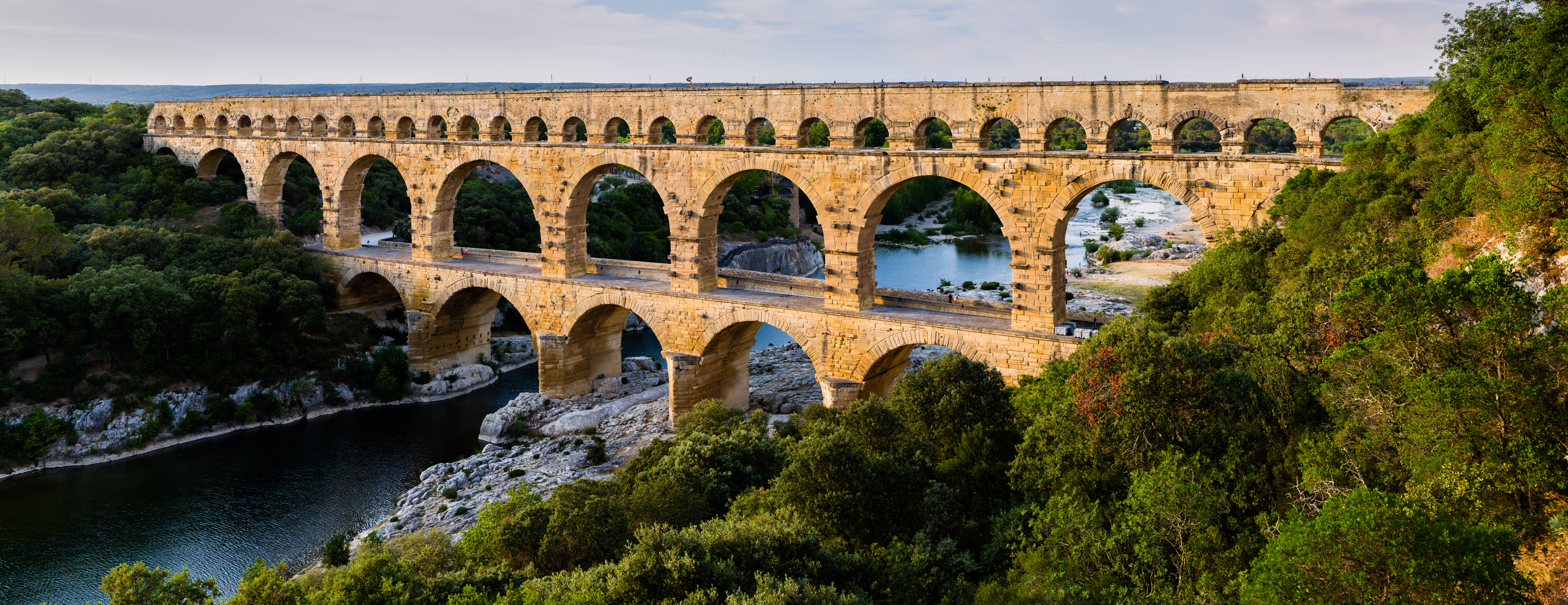
- Pont du Gard

- Coat of arms
- Location of Vers-Pont-du-Gard
- Location within France Location within Occitanie
- Coordinates: 43°58′10″N 4°31′30″E
- Country: France
- Region: Occitania
- Department: Gard
- Arrondissement: Nîmes
- Canton: Redessan
- Intercommunality: Pont du Gard

Government
  - Mayor (2020–2026): Olivier Sauzet
- Area^{1}: 19.14 km^{2} (7.39 sq mi)
- Elevation: 52 m (171 ft)
- Highest elevation: 192 m (630 ft)
- Lowest elevation: 15 m (49 ft)
- Population (2023): 1,786
  - Density: 93.31/km^{2} (241.7/sq mi)
- Time zone: UTC+01:00 (CET)
  - Summer (DST): UTC+02:00 (CEST)
- INSEE/Postal code: 30346 /30210
- ^{1} French Land Register data, which excludes lakes, ponds, glaciers > 1 km^{2} (0.386 sq mi or 247 acres) and river estuaries.

Vers-Pont-du-Gard (French pronunciation: [vɛʁs pɔ̃ dy ɡaʁ]; Vèrs in Occitan) is a commune in the Gard department in southern France.

The Pont du Gard is located on the territory of the commune.

== Gallery ==
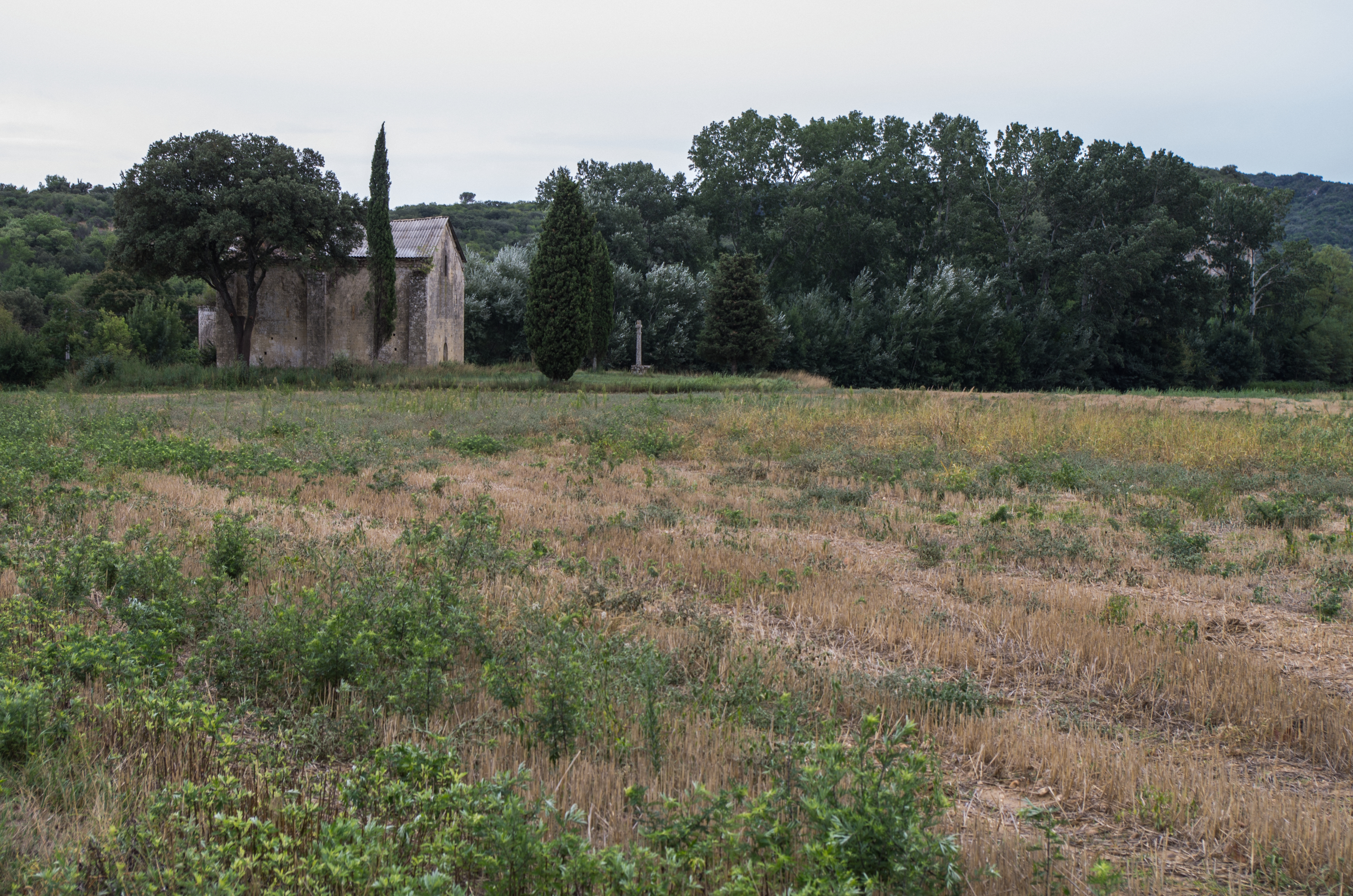
Chapelle Saint-Pierre

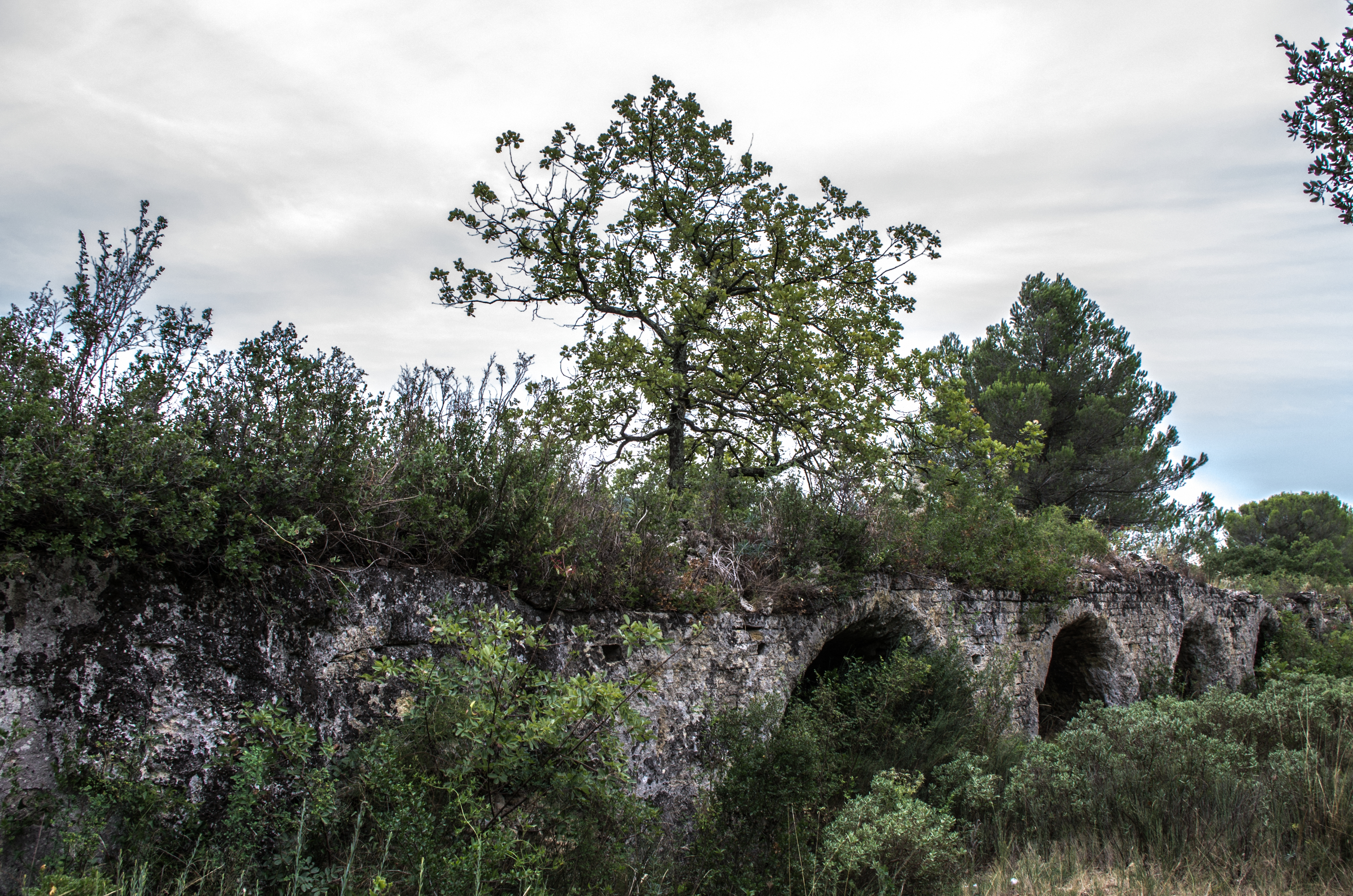
Ancient Roman aqueduct

== Population ==
Historical population
Year	Pop.	±% p.a.
1968	644	—
1975	739	+1.99%
1982	924	+3.24%
1990	1,110	+2.32%
1999	1,322	+1.96%
2007	1,609	+2.49%
2012	1,788	+2.13%
2017	1,850	+0.68%
2023	1,786	−0.59%
Source: INSEE

== International relations ==
Vers-Pont-du-Gard is twinned with:

- Santa Vittoria d'Alba, Italy
- Palézieux, Switzerland

== See also ==
- Communes of the Gard department
