= Saint-Hilaire-d'Ozilhan =

- Commune
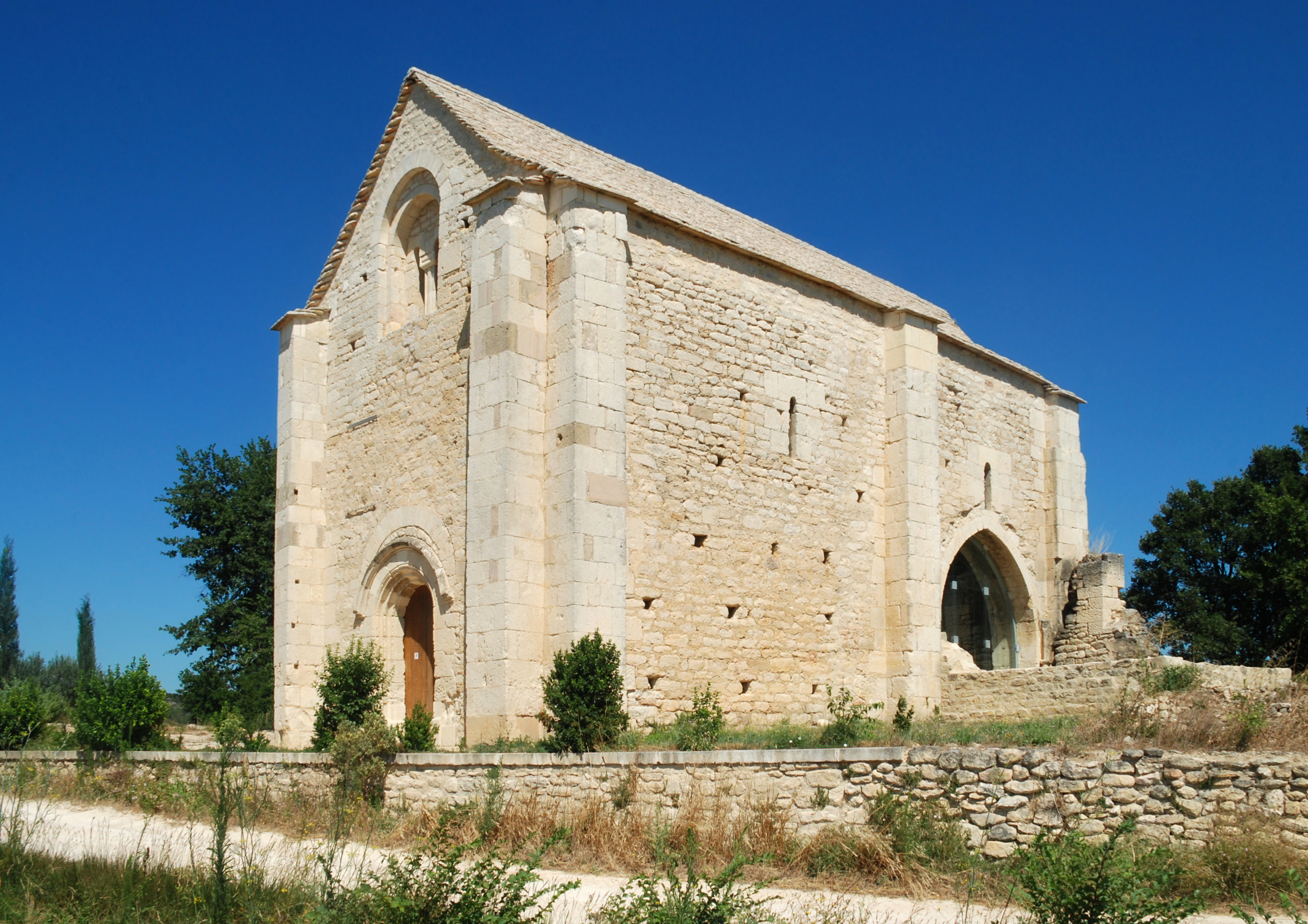
- The Chapel of Saint-Étienne in Saint-Hilaire-d'Ozilhan

- Coat of arms
- Location of Saint-Hilaire-d'Ozilhan
- Location within France Location within Occitanie
- Coordinates: 43°58′16″N 4°35′34″E
- Country: France
- Region: Occitania
- Department: Gard
- Arrondissement: Nîmes
- Canton: Redessan
- Intercommunality: Pont du Gard

Government
  - Mayor (2020–2026): Liliane Ozenda
- Area^{1}: 16.66 km^{2} (6.43 sq mi)
- Elevation: 52 m (171 ft)
- Highest elevation: 233 m (764 ft)
- Lowest elevation: 24 m (79 ft)
- Population (2023): 1,106
  - Density: 66.39/km^{2} (171.9/sq mi)
- Time zone: UTC+01:00 (CET)
  - Summer (DST): UTC+02:00 (CEST)
- INSEE/Postal code: 30260 /30210
- ^{1} French Land Register data, which excludes lakes, ponds, glaciers > 1 km^{2} (0.386 sq mi or 247 acres) and river estuaries.

Saint-Hilaire-d'Ozilhan (French pronunciation: [sɛ̃.t‿ilɛʁ dozijɑ̃]; Occitan: Sent Alari d'Ausilhan) is a commune in the Gard department in southern France.

== Population ==
Historical population
Year	Pop.	±% p.a.
1968	382	—
1975	419	+1.33%
1982	461	+1.37%
1990	618	+3.73%
1999	640	+0.39%
2007	666	+0.50%
2012	880	+5.73%
2017	1,069	+3.97%
2023	1,106	+0.57%
Source: INSEE

== See also ==
- Communes of the Gard department
