= Valliguières =

- Commune
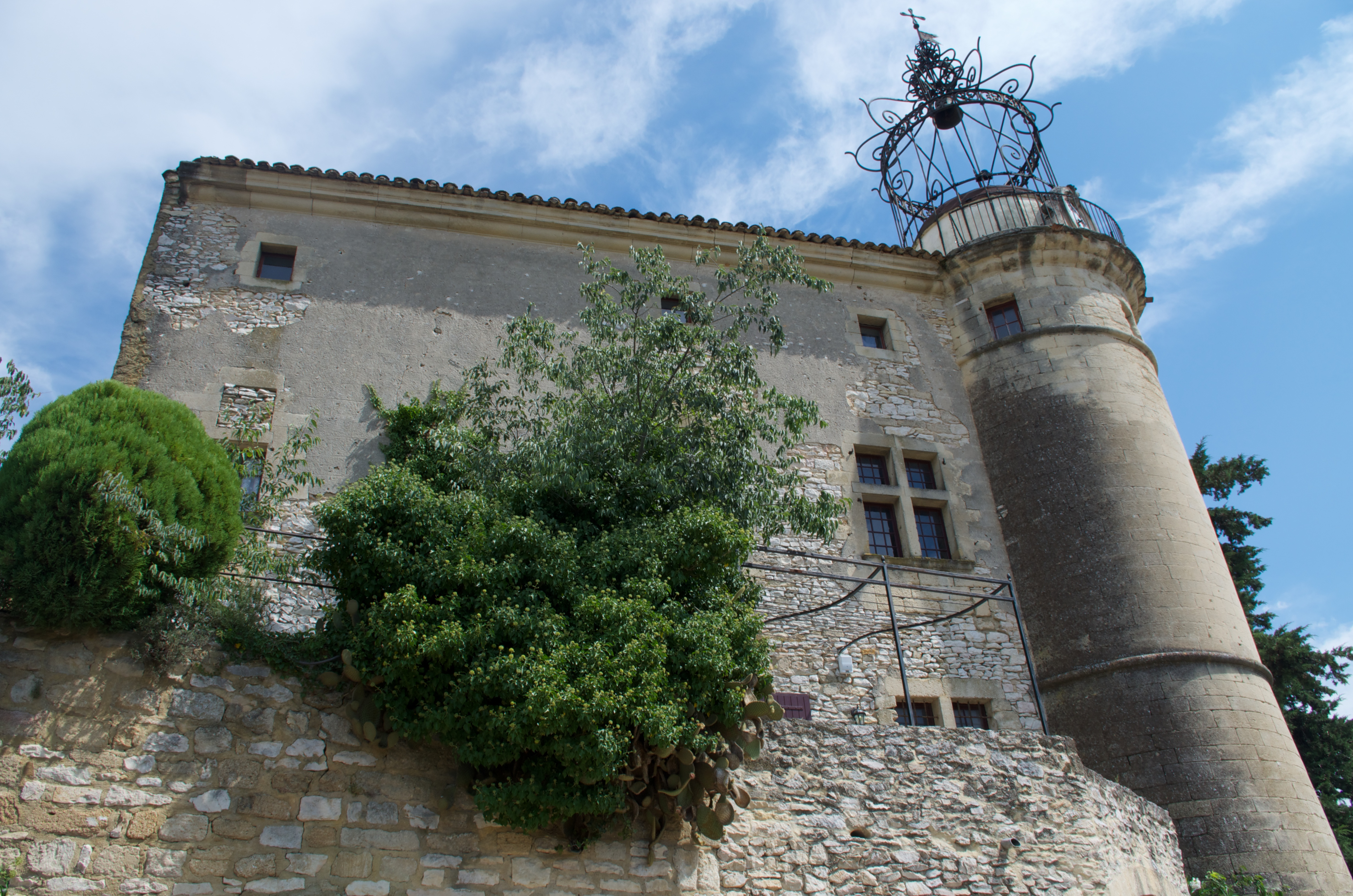
- The tower of the château of Valliguières

- Coat of arms
- Location of Valliguières
- Location within France Location within Occitanie
- Coordinates: 44°00′28″N 4°34′48″E
- Country: France
- Region: Occitania
- Department: Gard
- Arrondissement: Nîmes
- Canton: Redessan
- Intercommunality: Pont du Gard

Government
  - Mayor (2020–2026): Laurence Trapier
- Area^{1}: 19.25 km^{2} (7.43 sq mi)
- Elevation: 170 m (560 ft)
- Highest elevation: 271 m (889 ft)
- Lowest elevation: 92 m (302 ft)
- Population (2023): 653
  - Density: 33.9/km^{2} (87.9/sq mi)
- Time zone: UTC+01:00 (CET)
  - Summer (DST): UTC+02:00 (CEST)
- INSEE/Postal code: 30340 /30210
- ^{1} French Land Register data, which excludes lakes, ponds, glaciers > 1 km^{2} (0.386 sq mi or 247 acres) and river estuaries.

Valliguières (French pronunciation: [valigjɛʁ]; Occitan: Valaiguièra) is a commune in the Gard department in southern France.

== Population ==
Historical population
Year	Pop.	±% p.a.
1968	180	—
1975	206	+1.95%
1982	276	+4.27%
1990	313	+1.58%
1999	371	+1.91%
2007	471	+3.03%
2012	549	+3.11%
2017	584	+1.24%
2023	653	+1.88%
Source: INSEE

== See also ==
- Communes of the Gard department
