= Cabrières, Gard =

Commune in Occitanie, France

Cabrières
- Commune
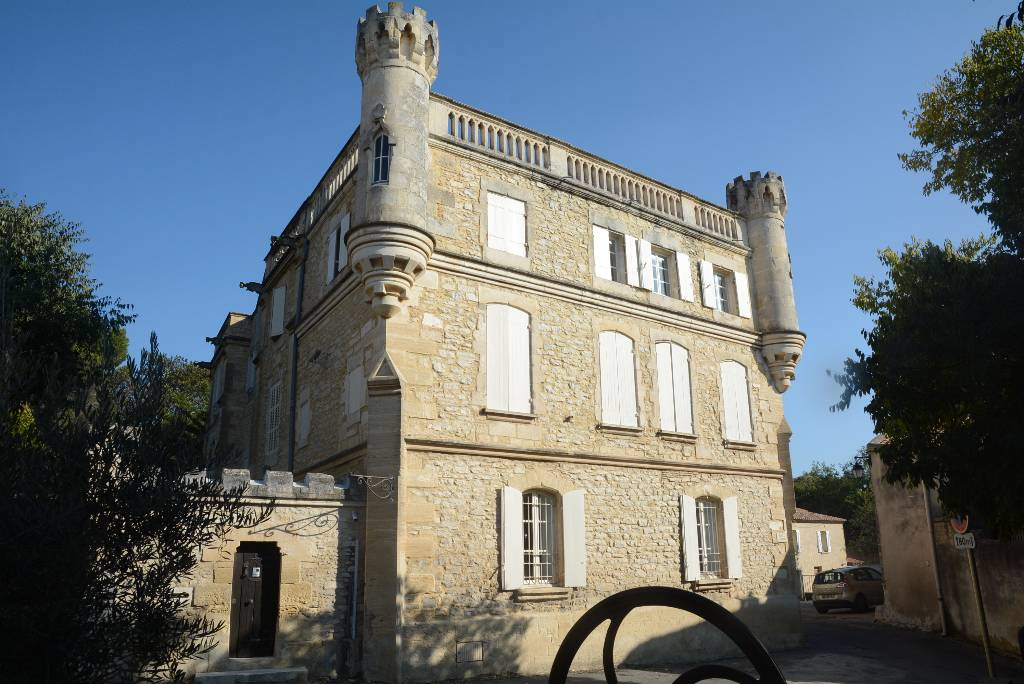
- The chateau in Cabrières
- Location of Cabrières
- Location within France Location within Occitanie
- Coordinates: 43°54′20″N 4°28′21″E
- Country: France
- Region: Occitania
- Department: Gard
- Arrondissement: Nîmes
- Canton: Redessan
- Intercommunality: CA Nîmes Métropole

Government
  - Mayor (2020–2026): Gilles Gadille
- Area^{1}: 14.76 km^{2} (5.70 sq mi)
- Elevation: 200 m (660 ft)
- Highest elevation: 218 m (715 ft)
- Lowest elevation: 75 m (246 ft)
- Population (2023): 1,817
  - Density: 123.1/km^{2} (318.8/sq mi)
- Time zone: UTC+01:00 (CET)
  - Summer (DST): UTC+02:00 (CEST)
- INSEE/Postal code: 30057 /30210
- ^{1} French Land Register data, which excludes lakes, ponds, glaciers > 1 km^{2} (0.386 sq mi or 247 acres) and river estuaries.

Cabrières (French pronunciation: [kabʁijɛʁ]; Occitan: Cabrièira) is a commune in the Gard department in southern France.

== Population ==
Historical population
Year	Pop.	±% p.a.
1968	236	—
1975	337	+5.22%
1982	570	+7.80%
1990	875	+5.50%
1999	1,117	+2.75%
2007	1,309	+2.00%
2012	1,542	+3.33%
2017	1,623	+1.03%
2023	1,817	+1.90%
Source: INSEE

== See also ==
- Communes of the Gard department
