= Collias =

Commune in Occitanie, France

- Commune
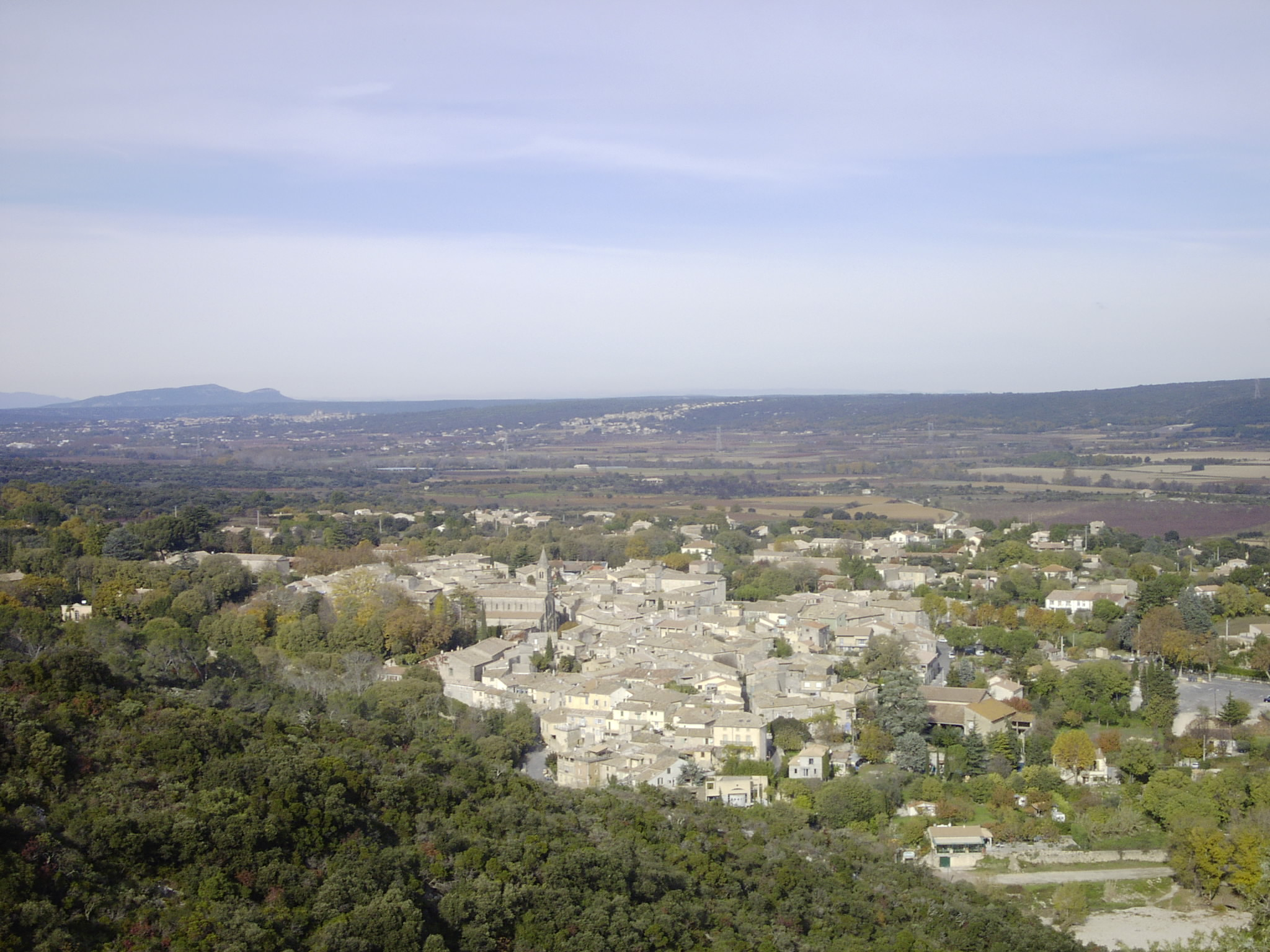
- A general view of Collias

- Coat of arms
- Location of Collias
- Location within France Location within Occitanie
- Coordinates: 43°57′17″N 4°28′40″E
- Country: France
- Region: Occitania
- Department: Gard
- Arrondissement: Nîmes
- Canton: Redessan
- Intercommunality: Pont du Gard

Government
  - Mayor (2020–2026): Jonathan Pire
- Area^{1}: 20.42 km^{2} (7.88 sq mi)
- Elevation: 65 m (213 ft)
- Highest elevation: 212 m (696 ft)
- Lowest elevation: 20 m (66 ft)
- Population (2023): 1,095
  - Density: 53.62/km^{2} (138.9/sq mi)
- Time zone: UTC+01:00 (CET)
  - Summer (DST): UTC+02:00 (CEST)
- INSEE/Postal code: 30085 /30210
- ^{1} French Land Register data, which excludes lakes, ponds, glaciers > 1 km^{2} (0.386 sq mi or 247 acres) and river estuaries.

Collias (French pronunciation: [kɔljas]; Occitan: Colhaç) is a commune in the Gard department in southern France.

== Population ==
Historical population
Year	Pop.	±% p.a.
1968	520	—
1975	510	−0.28%
1982	617	+2.76%
1990	756	+2.57%
1999	829	+1.03%
2007	973	+2.02%
2012	1,073	+1.98%
2017	1,090	+0.31%
2023	1,095	+0.08%
Source: INSEE

== See also ==
- Communes of the Gard department
