= Le Phénicien (barge) =

History

France
- Name: Le Phénicien
- Owner: Rhône Croisière s.a.r.l
- Route: River Rhône and Canal du Rhône à Sète
- Builder: Strasbourg
- Launched: 1968
- Acquired: 2001
- Status: In service

General characteristics
- Class & type: Commercial passenger vessel
- Tonnage: 270 tonnes
- Length: 38.50 m (126.3 ft)
- Beam: 5.05 m (16.6 ft)
- Height: 3.35 m (11.0 ft)
- Draught: 1.40 m (4.6 ft)
- Installed power: Originally Berlier 250 hp with turbo
- Propulsion: Caterpillar 360 hp with turbo
- Sail plan: Through Provence and Camargue between Avignon and Aigues-Mortes
- Speed: cruising speed 12km/h (in open waters)
- Capacity: 18 passengers
- Crew: 6 crew

Le Phénicien is a converted barge (péniche) of Freycinet dimensions, fitted out and operated as a hotel barge in Southern France. She is one of a fleet of barges of different dimensions operated throughout the European network of smaller waterways, mostly in France. According to the waterway authority Voies Navigables de France, there are around 80 barges operating as hotel boats.

== History ==
Le Phénicien is one of the most recent Freycinet barges (after the French public works minister who in 1879 decreed the standard dimensions of 38.50m by 5.05m). Built in a Strasbourg shipyard in 1968 as Himalaya, the barge typically carried cereals and sand between the south of France and Belgium. She was acquired by the current owners in 2000, and fitted out as a hotel barge over a period of 18 months. The barge operates in Provence and Camargue between Avignon and Aigues-Mortes, on the Rhône and the Canal du Rhône à Sète.
