= Rue du Brexit =

Street in France

Coordinates: 43.7929°N 4.6429°E

- Brexit Street
- Length: 0.325 km (0.202 mi)
- Location: Beaucaire, Occitanie

Other
- Known for: Brexit

Rue du Brexit (English: Brexit Street) is a 325-metre-long (1,066 ft) circuitous road in Beaucaire, Occitanie, France. It was named after Brexit in 2016 by the town's mayor as a tribute to the United Kingdom following their vote to leave the European Union in the 2016 United Kingdom European Union membership referendum.

== History ==
The road that would become Rue du Brexit in Beaucaire was previously unnamed. It is a circuitous road on an industrial estate that leaves Rue Robert Schuman (named for a founder of the European Economic Community) and rejoins it some 60 m (200 ft) later. In 2016, following the United Kingdom's vote to leave the European Union the Front National mayor of Beaucaire Julien Sanchez, decided to name the road Rue du Brexit as a "homage to the decision of the sovereign British people". Sanchez also justified Rue du Brexit as he said the then unnamed road needed a title to assist emergency services with location. The motion for the naming was approved by Beaucaire council by a 29–9 vote.

== Reaction ==
Reaction to the new street name was mixed worldwide. Leave.EU which campaigned for the UK to leave during the referendum called it "A fine choice!". Sanchez revealed to French radio that he had received several messages of support from the UK, some of which he said were from Members of Parliament. However, criticism was leveled at it for the location and direction with the American Washington Post calling it "an ugly, dead-end road". Some of the local residents of Beaucaire also criticised Sanchez for using an English word for a French street. Some newspapers also alleged it was done as a political reminder to French voters of the promise to hold a French referendum on European Union membership if the Front National leader Marine Le Pen won the 2017 French presidential election.

== See also ==
- French withdrawal from the European Union
