= Lycée Professionnel Paul Langevin =

State school in Beaucaire, France

The Lycée Professionnel Paul Langevin de Beaucaire (French pronunciation: [lə lise pʁɔfesionɛl pol lɑ̃ʒvɛ̃ də bokɛʁ]) is a state school in Beaucaire, situated on "Rue de la Redoute" in the downtown. It has approximately 300 students, from secondary school to Baccalauréat. Founded in 1970, the Lycée has both traditional buildings and modern constructions. Since 2009 Lycée has been restructured with more of 12 million euros. As of 2012, the school's director is Pascal Lorblanchet.
