= Vallabrègues =

- Commune
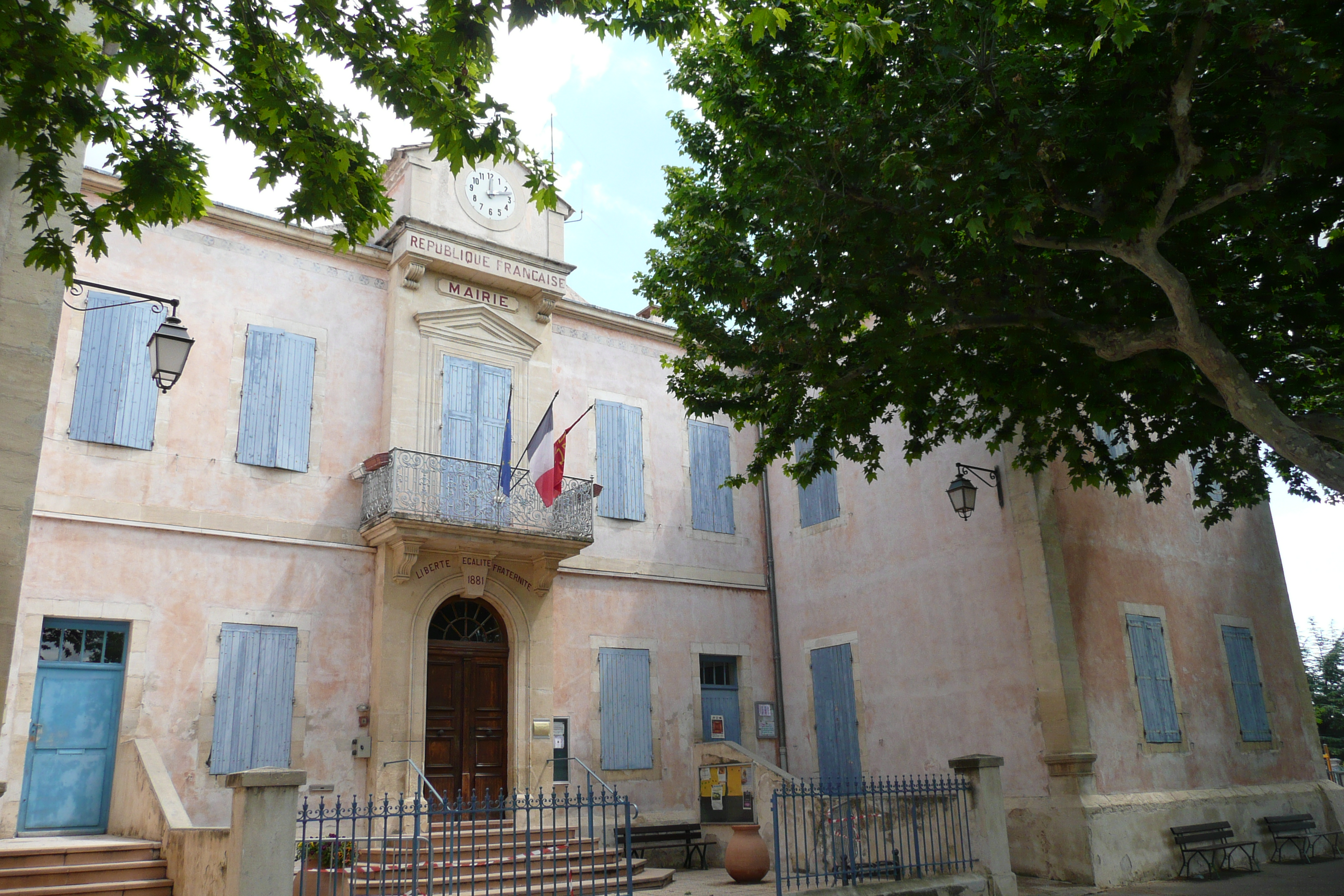
- Town hall

- Coat of arms
- Location of Vallabrègues
- Location within France Location within Occitanie
- Coordinates: 43°51′14″N 4°37′42″E
- Country: France
- Region: Occitania
- Department: Gard
- Arrondissement: Nîmes
- Canton: Beaucaire

Government
  - Mayor (2021–2026): Jean-Marie Gilles
- Area^{1}: 14.33 km^{2} (5.53 sq mi)
- Elevation: 5 m (16 ft)
- Highest elevation: 24 m (79 ft)
- Lowest elevation: 4 m (13 ft)
- Population (2023): 1,375
  - Density: 95.95/km^{2} (248.5/sq mi)
- Time zone: UTC+01:00 (CET)
  - Summer (DST): UTC+02:00 (CEST)
- INSEE/Postal code: 30336 /30300
- ^{1} French Land Register data, which excludes lakes, ponds, glaciers > 1 km^{2} (0.386 sq mi or 247 acres) and river estuaries.

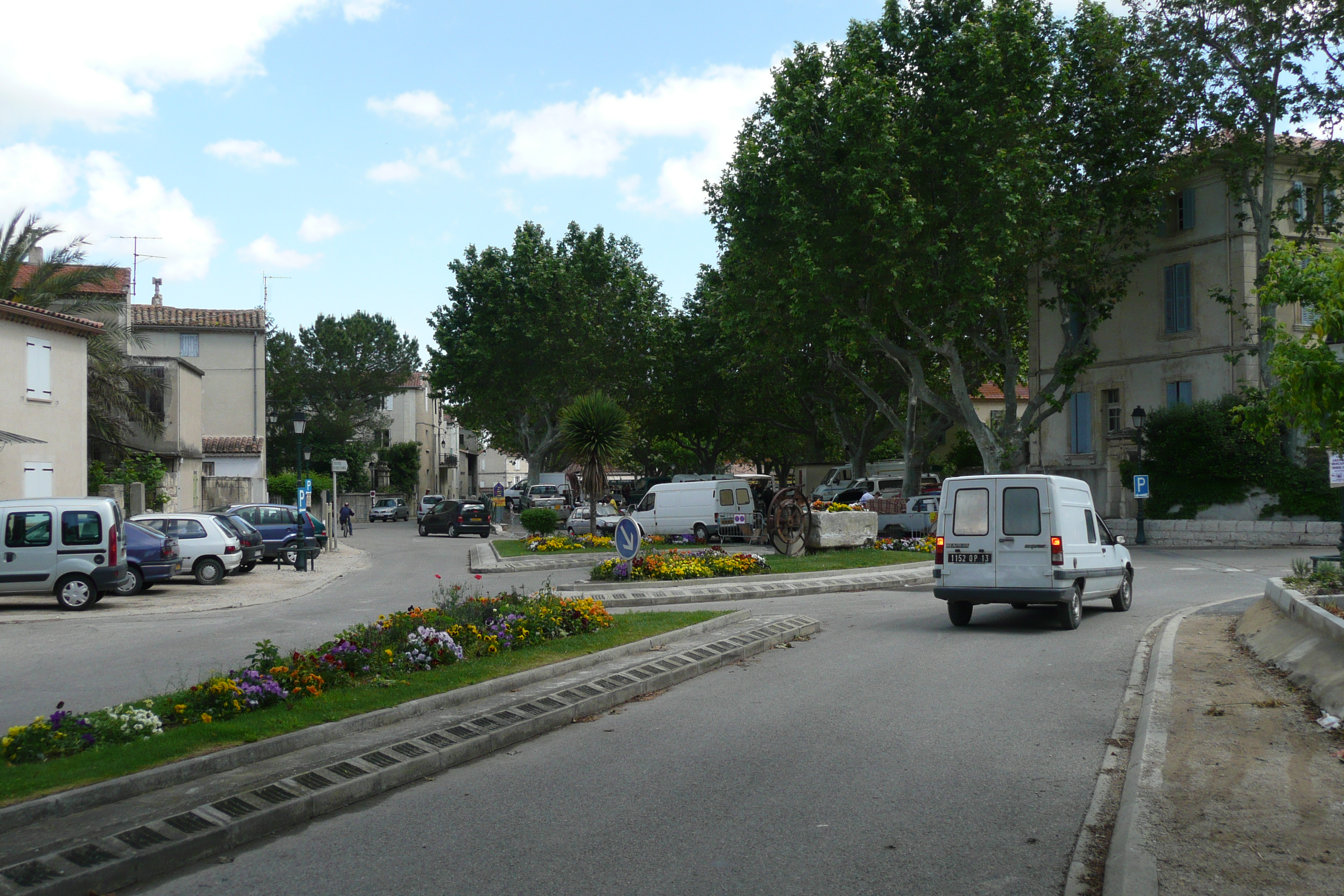
A street in Vallabrègues

Vallabrègues (French pronunciation: [valabʁɛɡ]; Occitan: Valabrega) is a commune in the Gard department in southern France.

== Geography ==
Vallabrègues is the only commune of the Gard department located on the left bank of the river Rhône. It is located opposite the part of the territory of the commune of Beaucaire close to the confluence of the Gardon.

Its closest town is Tarascon, where the Festival of the Tarasque monster is held every year on the last Sunday of June. Vallabrègues is about a 20-minute drive from Tarascon. It is also near the towns of Nîmes, Arles and Avignon.

The area enjoys around 200 days of sunshine a year, and has a dry but warm Mediterranean climate.

== Population ==
Historical population
Year	Pop.	±% p.a.
1968	1,082	—
1975	918	−2.32%
1982	960	+0.64%
1990	1,016	+0.71%
1999	1,197	+1.84%
2007	1,289	+0.93%
2012	1,368	+1.20%
2017	1,392	+0.35%
2023	1,375	−0.20%
Source: INSEE

== Features ==
Vallabrègues has a small dock for boats traveling on the Rhône River and has tennis courts, a campground, and the "Lac de Vallabrègues", a small pond surrounded by grass, a playground, picnic area and a trail for walking.

The town hall contains the mayor's office which is surrounded by the kindergarten-primary school. On the same square is the post office and local Catholic church. There is one main supermarket, a butcher, two cafe/restaurants, two pizza restaurants and also a small open-air market on Thursdays.

People enjoy playing pétanque, or boules in the sandy areas under shady trees near the town center.

The streets of Vallabregues are too narrow for cars, and most villagers get around on foot or by bicycle.

== Culture ==
Basket weaving is traditional and unique to Vallabrègues. They hold a festival every year during the month of August and home-made baskets are displayed in the street and on front of houses. There is a museum commemorating the unique tradition of the village.

Vallabrègues used to be the biggest basket-producer in France, back when baskets were widely in use for transport, carrying etc. The village's proximity to the Rhône River ensured that willows grew near the village that were used for basket weaving after soaking. Nowadays, though, basket-weaving is fast disappearing. This is why, in 1990, Vallabrègues decided to hold a festival and parade every year, bringing basket-makers from all over Europe in a giant fair that gives an identity to an otherwise seemingly typical Provence town. However, Vallabregues is also captured in time because of the 2003 floods, "inondation" in French. Since then no new building is permitted in the town, because even though there are sophisticated warning systems to keep occupants safe the town is almost directly opposite where the river Gard enters the Rhone.

== See also ==
- Communes of the Gard department
