= Beaucaire Canal =

Canal in southern France

Coordinates: 43°25′N 3°42′E

Canal de Beaucaire
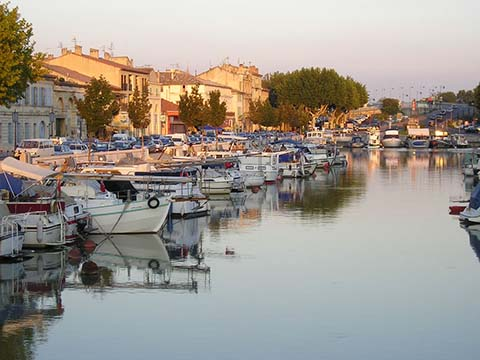

Specifications
- Length: 51 km (32 mi)

History
- Construction began: 1777
- Date completed: 1808

Geography
- Start point: Aigues-Mortes
- End point: Rhone

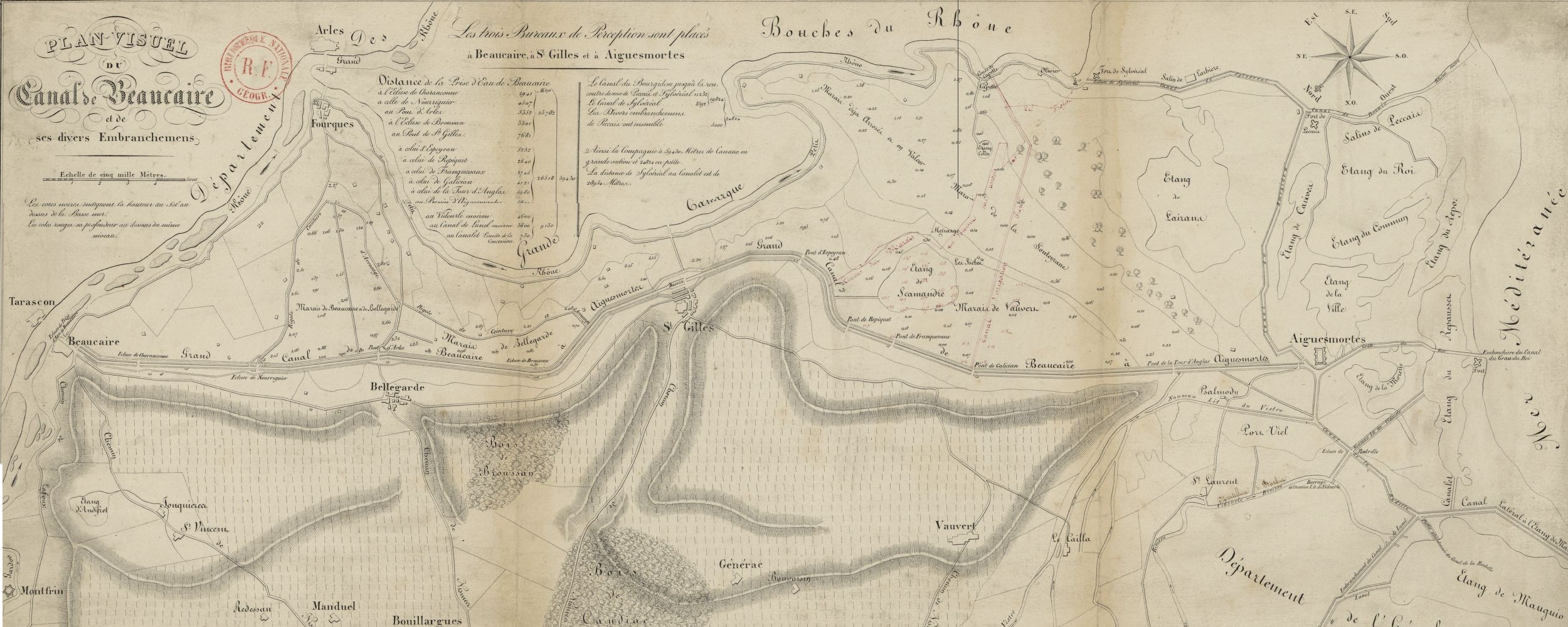
A map of the Canal de Beaucaire from Godefroy Engelmann's printing company

The Canal de Beaucaire (French pronunciation: [kanal də bokɛʁ]) was a canal in southern France. It is now part of the Canal du Rhône à Sète along with the Canal des Ètangs. The originator was to be the Marshal de Noailles. However he did nothing and his concession was revoked. It was then granted to a company formed by Marshal de Richelieu, but again, nothing was accomplished until the state of Languedoc took over. Construction was finally begun in 1777 and completed in 1808. It was to connect the city of Aigues-Mortes to the Rhone.

== En Route ==
- PK 0 Beaucaire
- PK 13.5 Bellegarde
- PK 24.5 Saint-Gilles
- PK 51 Aigues-Mortes

== See also ==
- List of canals in France
