= Étangs Canal =

Canal in southern France

Coordinates: 43.5220°N 3.8951°E

Canal des Étangs

Specifications
- Length: 49 km (30 mi)

Geography
- Start point: Sete
- End point: Aigues-Mortes

The Canal des Étangs (French pronunciation: [kanal dez‿etɑ̃]) was a canal in southern France. It is now part of the Canal du Rhône à Sète along with the Canal de Beaucaire. It was created by the state of Languedoc. The project consisted of enlarging ancient medieval channels through and between the shallow lakes and salt marshes, connecting Sète and Aigues-Mortes.

== En Route ==
- PK 51 Aigues-Mortes
- PK 61.5 Grande Motte
- PK 70.5 Pérols
- PK 75.5 Palavas-les-Flots
- PK 79 Villeneuve-lès-Maguelone
- PK 92-93 Frontignan
- PK 98-100 Sète

== See also ==
- List of canals in France
