= Rhône-Sète Canal =

Canal in southern France

Coordinates: 43°25′N 3°42′E

Canal du Rhône à Sète
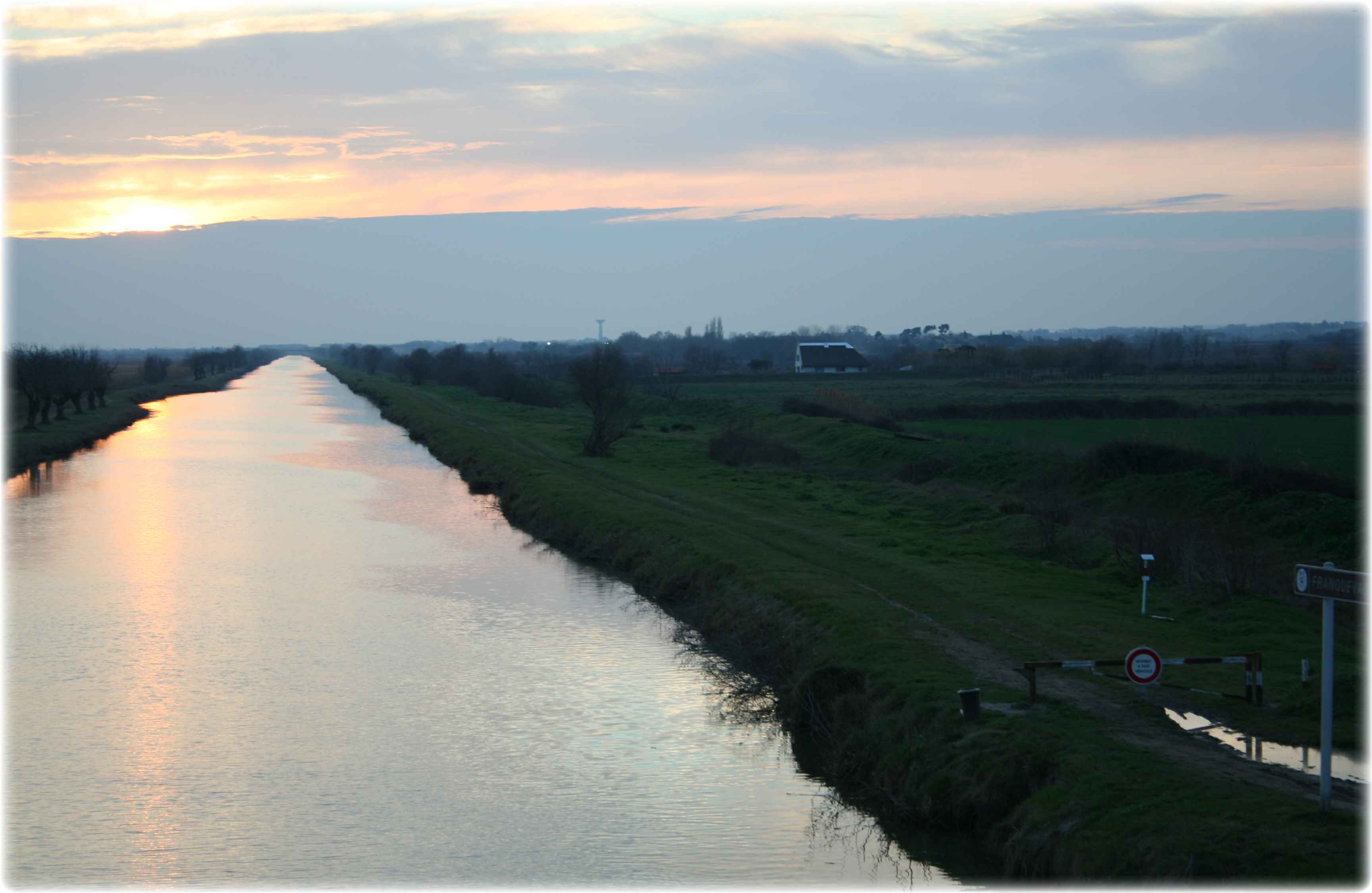
- The canal near Franquevaux, in the commune of Beauvoisin, Gard

Specifications
- Length: 98 km
- Locks: 1

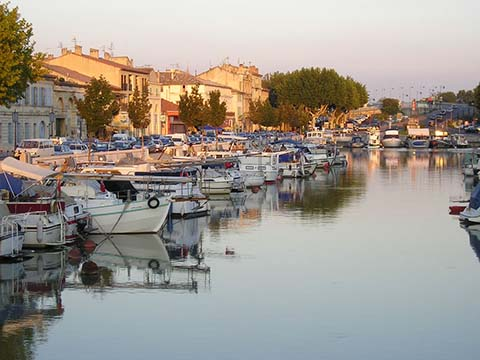
Sunset at Beaucaire marina

The Canal du Rhône à Sète (French pronunciation: [kanal dy ʁon a sɛt]; lit. "canal from the Rhône to Sète") is a canal in southern France, which connects the Étang de Thau in Sète to the Rhône River in Beaucaire, Gard. The canal is made up of two previously constructed canals, the Canal des Étangs and Canal de Beaucaire. It connects with the Canal du Midi through the Étang de Thau.

There is, however, no access to the Rhône at Beaucaire as the lock has been closed since the Vallebregues barrage was built. The possibility of re-establishing the link "is being studied, but there is no prospect for the immediate future". Access to the Rhône is instead via the lock situated to the west of Saint-Gilles which links the canal to the Petit Rhône and from there northeastwards to the junction with the Grand Rhône at Fourques situated to the north of Arles.

Apart from the lock at Saint-Gilles there is only one other operating lock on the canal between St Gilles and Beaucaire. The canal is almost totally situated at sea level and the western part from the Vidourle river to the Étang de Thau is a sea-water canal.

In recent years major work has been undertaken to upgrade the canal so it can now be used by 1200t convoys instead of the previous 350t barges. Most notable are a stretch of canal bypassing the town of Aigues-Mortes with its railway swing bridge and a direct canal link to the port of Sète eliminating the passage of lifting and swing bridges in Frontignan and Sète.

== En Route ==
- PK 0 Beaucaire
- PK 13.5 Bellegarde
- PK 24.5 Saint-Gilles
- PK 29 Junction with Canal de Saint-Gilles and Petit-Rhône (canal a dead end from here to Beaucaire)
- PK 51 Aigues-Mortes, junction with Canal maritime to Le Grau-du-Roi
- PK 61.5 Grande Motte
- PK 70.5 Pérols
- PK 75.5 Palavas-les-Flots, junction with river Lez, access to Port Ariane for Montpellier and to the Mediterranean Sea
- PK 79 Villeneuve-lès-Maguelone
- PK 82 Vic-la-Gardiole
- PK 92-93 Frontignan, junction with high-capacity branch canal to the port of Sète
- PK 98-100 Sète

== See also ==
- List of canals in France

== External sources ==
- Canal du Rhône à Sète and Étang de Thau, with maps and details of places, ports and moorings by the author of Inland Waterways of France, Imray
- Navigation details for 80 French rivers and canals (French waterways website section)
