= Comps, Gard =

Comps
- Commune
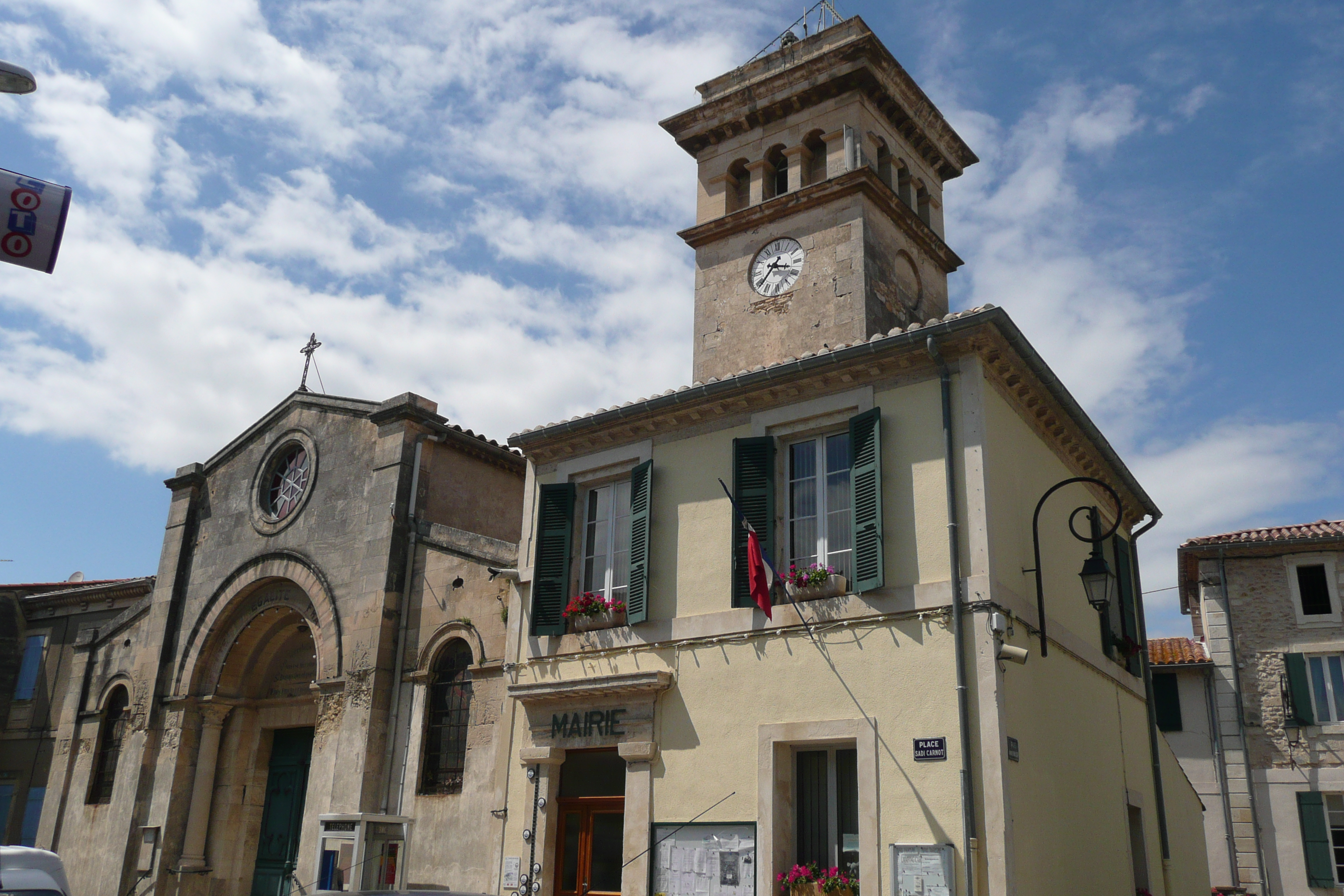
- The church of Comps
- Location of Comps
- Location within France Location within Occitanie
- Coordinates: 43°51′12″N 4°36′24″E
- Country: France
- Region: Occitania
- Department: Gard
- Arrondissement: Nîmes
- Canton: Beaucaire
- Intercommunality: Pont du Gard

Government
  - Mayor (2020–2026): Jean-Jacques Rochette
- Area^{1}: 8.6 km^{2} (3.3 sq mi)
- Elevation: 10 m (33 ft)
- Highest elevation: 150 m (490 ft)
- Lowest elevation: 6 m (20 ft)
- Population (2023): 1,688
  - Density: 200/km^{2} (510/sq mi)
- Time zone: UTC+01:00 (CET)
  - Summer (DST): UTC+02:00 (CEST)
- INSEE/Postal code: 30089 /30300
- ^{1} French Land Register data, which excludes lakes, ponds, glaciers > 1 km^{2} (0.386 sq mi or 247 acres) and river estuaries.

Comps (French pronunciation: [kɔ̃ps]; Occitan: Combs) is a commune in the Gard department in southern France.

== Population ==
Historical population
Year	Pop.	±% p.a.
1968	772	—
1975	813	+0.74%
1982	1,239	+6.20%
1990	1,435	+1.85%
1999	1,483	+0.37%
2007	1,582	+0.81%
2012	1,675	+1.15%
2017	1,784	+1.27%
2023	1,688	−0.92%
Source: INSEE

== See also ==
- Communes of the Gard department
