= Canton of Beaucaire =

Coordinates: 43.81°N 4.64°E

The canton of Beaucaire is an administrative division of the Gard department, southern France. Its borders were modified at the French canton reorganisation which came into effect in March 2015. Its seat is in Beaucaire.

It consists of the following communes:

1. Aramon
2. Beaucaire
3. Bellegarde
4. Comps
5. Fourques
6. Jonquières-Saint-Vincent
7. Vallabrègues
