= Fourques, Gard =

Fourques
- Commune
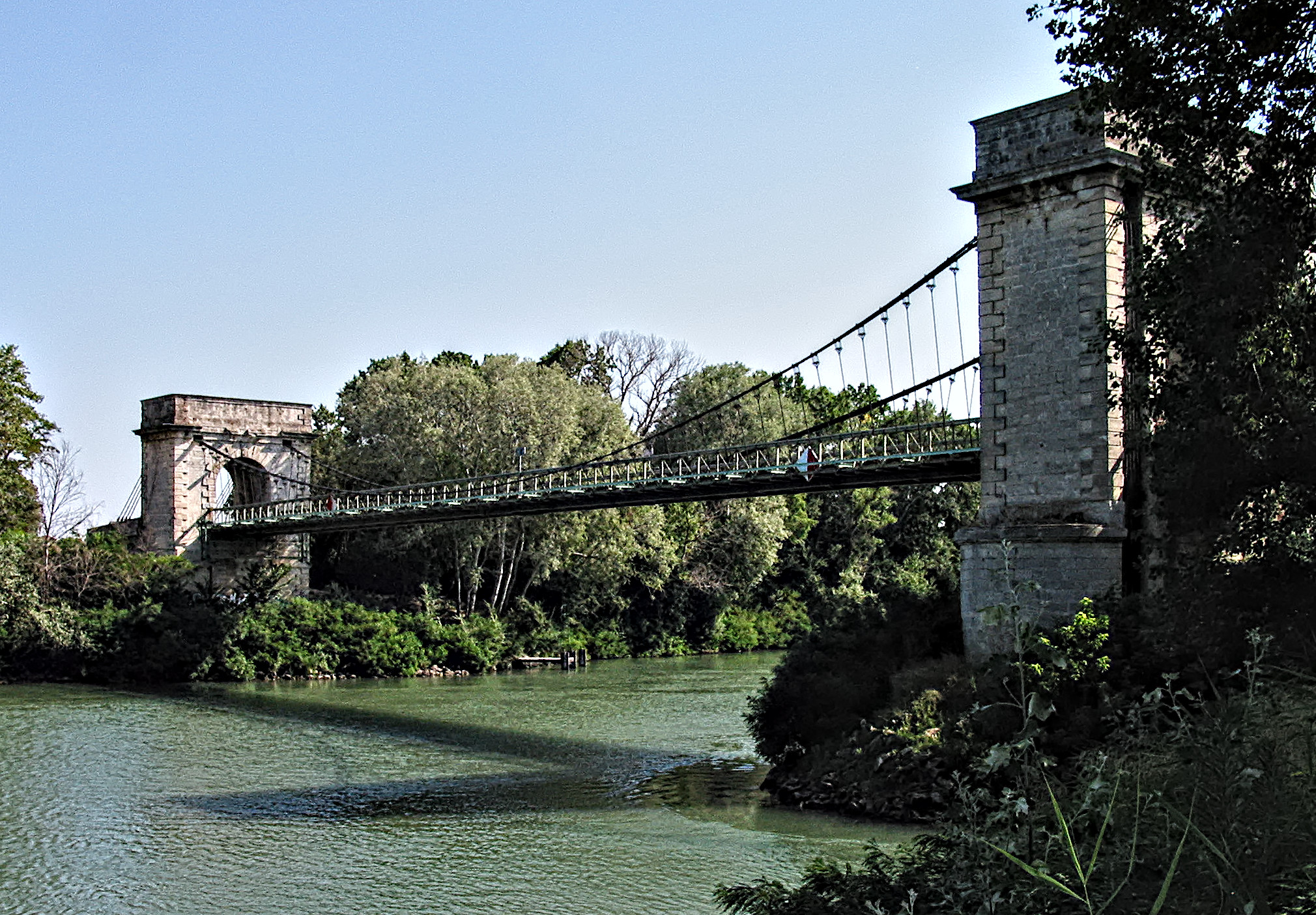
- Pont de Fourques: suspension bridge over the Petit Rhône

- Coat of arms
- Location of Fourques
- Location within France Location within Occitanie
- Coordinates: 43°41′38″N 4°36′40″E
- Country: France
- Region: Occitania
- Department: Gard
- Arrondissement: Nîmes
- Canton: Beaucaire
- Intercommunality: Beaucaire-Terre d'Argence

Government
  - Mayor (2020–2026): Gilles Dumas
- Area^{1}: 38.24 km^{2} (14.76 sq mi)
- Elevation: 3 m (9.8 ft)
- Highest elevation: 15 m (49 ft)
- Lowest elevation: 1 m (3.3 ft)
- Population (2023): 2,680
  - Density: 70.1/km^{2} (182/sq mi)
- Time zone: UTC+01:00 (CET)
  - Summer (DST): UTC+02:00 (CEST)
- INSEE/Postal code: 30117 /30300
- ^{1} French Land Register data, which excludes lakes, ponds, glaciers > 1 km^{2} (0.386 sq mi or 247 acres) and river estuaries.

Fourques (French pronunciation: [fuʁk]; Occitan: Forcas) is a commune and a village in the southeastern corner of the Gard department in southern France, some 4 km (2.5 mi) north of Arles. The village is located at the confluence of the Rhone and the Little Rhone and sprang up adjoining a bridge across the latter built by the Romans. A historic suspension bridge was constructed across the Little Rhone early in the nineteenth century.

== Geography ==
Fourques, meaning "fork", is located close to the Camargue delta at the point where the Little Rhone flows into the Rhone on the border between the Gard and the Bouches-du-Rhône. It is easily accessible from Autoroute A9 linking Nîmes and Montpellier. The land surrounding the village is flat and prone to flooding.

=== Climate ===
Fourques has a hot-summer Mediterranean climate (Köppen climate classification Csa). The average annual temperature in Fourques is 14.7 °C (58.5 °F). The average annual rainfall is 587.5 mm (23.13 in) with September as the wettest month. The temperatures are highest on average in July, at around 23.6 °C (74.5 °F), and lowest in January, at around 6.5 °C (43.7 °F).

Climate data for Fourques (1981−2010 normals, extremes 1981−present)
Month	Jan	Feb	Mar	Apr	May	Jun	Jul	Aug	Sep	Oct	Nov	Dec	Year
Record high °C (°F)	22.0 (71.6)	26.0 (78.8)	30.0 (86.0)	33.0 (91.4)	34.0 (93.2)	37.0 (98.6)	37.0 (98.6)	37.0 (98.6)	37.0 (98.6)	35.0 (95.0)	26.0 (78.8)	21.0 (69.8)	37.0 (98.6)
Mean daily maximum °C (°F)	10.6 (51.1)	12.2 (54.0)	15.9 (60.6)	18.7 (65.7)	22.5 (72.5)	26.7 (80.1)	29.5 (85.1)	29.1 (84.4)	25.2 (77.4)	20.5 (68.9)	14.5 (58.1)	11.0 (51.8)	19.7 (67.5)
Daily mean °C (°F)	6.5 (43.7)	7.5 (45.5)	10.6 (51.1)	13.3 (55.9)	17.3 (63.1)	21.0 (69.8)	23.6 (74.5)	23.2 (73.8)	19.6 (67.3)	15.8 (60.4)	10.4 (50.7)	7.2 (45.0)	14.7 (58.5)
Mean daily minimum °C (°F)	2.5 (36.5)	2.9 (37.2)	5.3 (41.5)	7.9 (46.2)	12.1 (53.8)	15.3 (59.5)	17.6 (63.7)	17.2 (63.0)	14.0 (57.2)	11.0 (51.8)	6.3 (43.3)	3.4 (38.1)	9.7 (49.5)
Record low °C (°F)	−12.0 (10.4)	−11.0 (12.2)	−10.0 (14.0)	−6.0 (21.2)	−1.0 (30.2)	4.0 (39.2)	9.0 (48.2)	10.0 (50.0)	1.0 (33.8)	−5.0 (23.0)	−22.0 (−7.6)	−13.0 (8.6)	−22.0 (−7.6)
Average precipitation mm (inches)	54.3 (2.14)	37.4 (1.47)	31.9 (1.26)	55.1 (2.17)	45.7 (1.80)	28.6 (1.13)	15.3 (0.60)	29.6 (1.17)	87.8 (3.46)	85.2 (3.35)	67.8 (2.67)	48.8 (1.92)	587.5 (23.13)
Average precipitation days (≥ 1.0 mm)	5.0	4.3	4.2	6.3	5.0	3.8	1.9	3.0	5.1	6.5	6.5	5.7	57.4
Source: Météo-France

== History ==
The village appears to have grown up next to the bridge which was built in the 2nd century to connect the Roman road Via Julia (Voie Julienne) to the Via Domitia at Beaucaire. Fourques Castle (Château de Fourques) is first mentioned in 1070 in an agreement involving Raymond of St Gilles. In 1180, it was besieged by the Alfonso II of Aragon while it was in the hands of Raymond of Toulouse. In 1215, the castle came into the ownership of Simon de Montfort but was returned to the Crown in 1229. The village church dates from the 15th century. Damaged during the religious wars, its roof was restored in the 16th century.

A suspension bridge over the Little Rhone was constructed between 1823 and 1825 and in 1909, the original wooden deck was replaced by metalwork. In 1944, the retreating German troops placed explosive charges beside the bridge which severely damaged the structure but it was reconstructed in 1946. During the construction of a canal in 1860, a stone sarcophagus with a central division was found, similar to those found at the Roman necropolis at Alyscamps, just outside Arles. It was left on the canal bank for some time but was rediscovered in 1954 and now stands in Church Square in the centre of the town.

In the late nineteenth century it was decided to construct a flood-prevention embankment closer to the River Rhone than previously so that a broad raised boulevard, "Les Lices", could be constructed between the bank and the houses. Around the same time, a water tower was built to provide clean drinking water to the village to replace the poor quality water being extracted from individual wells that had caused outbreaks of cholera in the past.

== Culture ==
The G Brassens Centre was built in 1984 and provides facilities for recreational, educational and other activities. For the past thirty years, an annual horse fair has been held in the village in September.

== Population ==
Historical population
Year	Pop.	±% p.a.
1968	1,492	—
1975	1,614	+1.13%
1982	2,047	+3.45%
1990	2,251	+1.19%
1999	2,544	+1.37%
2007	2,880	+1.56%
2012	2,873	−0.05%
2017	2,891	+0.12%
2023	2,680	−1.26%
Source: INSEE

== See also ==
- Communes of the Gard department
