= Julien Sanchez =

French politician

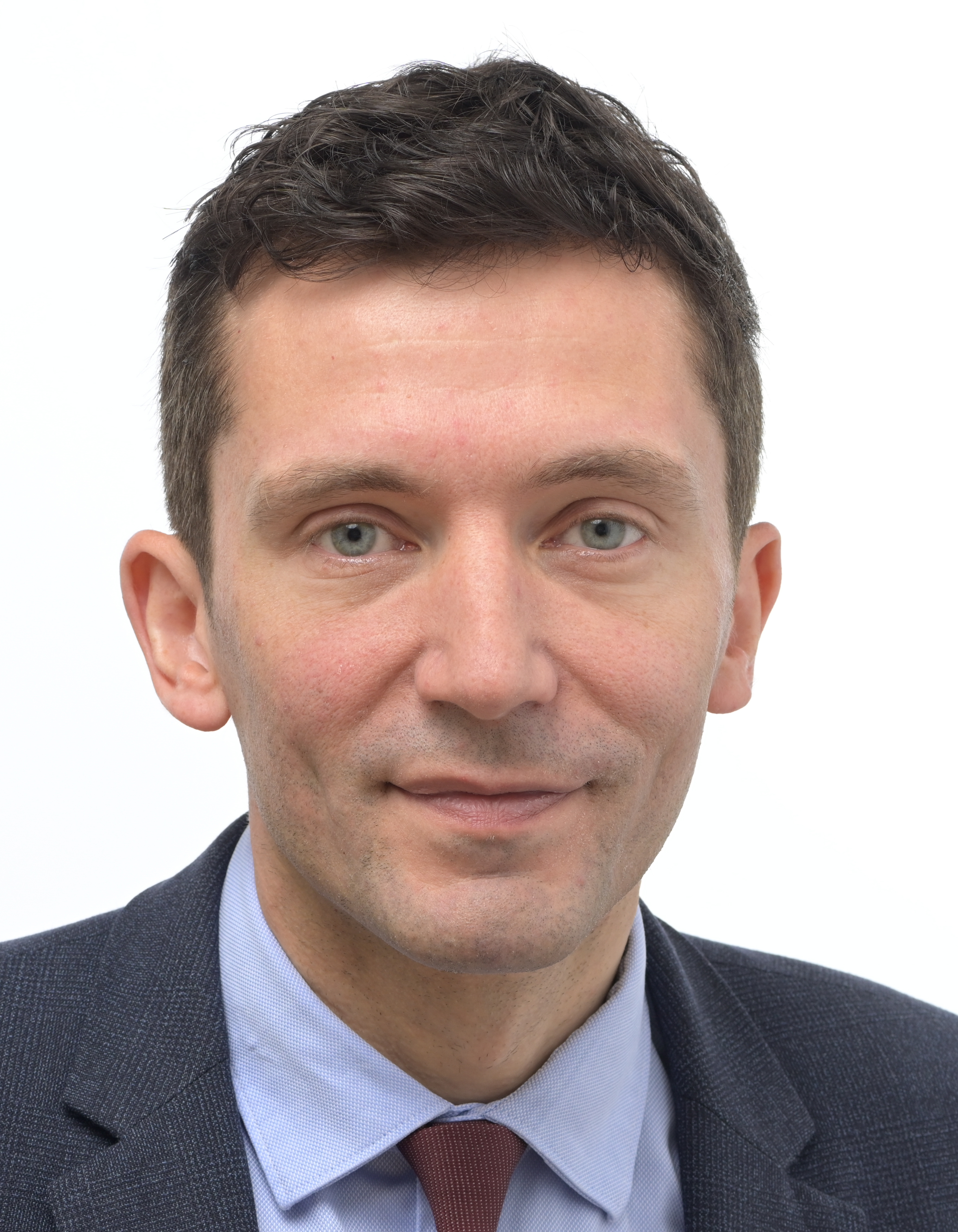
- Julien Sanchez in 2024

Member of the European Parliament for the French Republic
- Incumbent
- Assumed office 16 July 2024

Mayor of Beaucaire
- In office 5 April 2014 – 22 July 2024
- Preceded by: Jacques Bourbousson
- Succeeded by: Nelson Chaudon

Vice President of the National Rally
- Incumbent
- Assumed office 5 November 2022 Serving with Louis Aliot; David Rachline; Hélène Laporte; Edwige Diaz; Sébastien Chenu
- Leader: Jordan Bardella

Personal details
- Born: 19 October 1983 (age 42) Argenteuil, France
- Party: National Rally
- Education: University of Montpellier

Julien Sanchez (French pronunciation: [ʒyljɛ̃ sɑ̃tʃɛz]; born 19 October 1983) is a French politician who is a Member of the European Parliament since July 2024.

A member of the National Front since 2000, he has been its spokesperson since 2017. He was mayor of Beaucaire (Gard) from 2014 to 2024 and has been president of the Rassemblement national group at the Regional council of Occitanie. He was elected as a Member of the European Parliament in 2024.

== Biography ==
Julien Sanchez was born on 19 October 1983 in Argenteuil, Val-d'Oise.

He joined the National Front in 2000, at the age of 16.

In the 2014 municipal election in Beaucaire, the list he is leading leads the second round in a quadrangular format, with 39.8% of the votes.

In 2015, Sanchez lodged an application against the French Republic at the European Court of Human Rights (ECtHR), claiming his criminal conviction by a French court violated his right to freedom of expression. The French court convicted him for the offence of hate speech, following his failure to take prompt action to delete comments posted by third parties on the “wall” of his Facebook account. In 2023, the ECtHR ruled that there was no violation of his free speech, arguing that politicians in particular have a responsibility not to incite hatred.

== Bibliography ==
- This article is a translation of the French article titled Julien Sanchez
