= Jonquières-Saint-Vincent =

- Commune
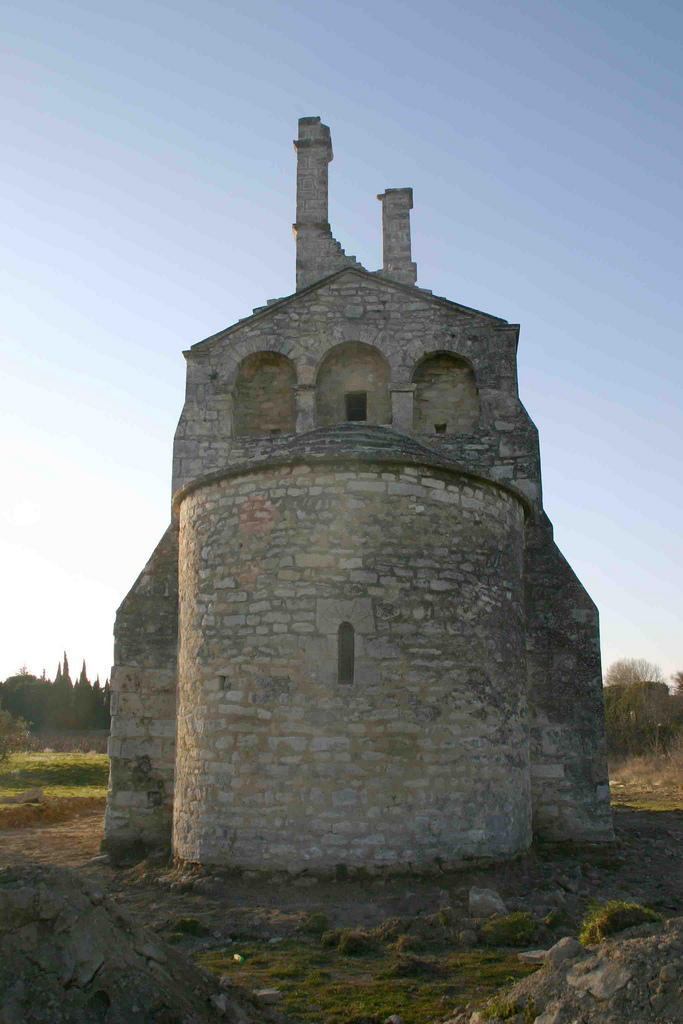
- 12th-century Saint-Laurent Chapel

- Coat of arms
- Location of Jonquières-Saint-Vincent
- Location within France Location within Occitanie
- Coordinates: 43°49′44″N 4°33′50″E
- Country: France
- Region: Occitania
- Department: Gard
- Arrondissement: Nîmes
- Canton: Beaucaire
- Intercommunality: Beaucaire-Terre d'Argence

Government
  - Mayor (2020–2026): Jean-Marie Fournier
- Area^{1}: 21.32 km^{2} (8.23 sq mi)
- Elevation: 42 m (138 ft)
- Highest elevation: 81 m (266 ft)
- Lowest elevation: 13 m (43 ft)
- Population (2023): 3,875
  - Density: 181.8/km^{2} (470.7/sq mi)
- Time zone: UTC+01:00 (CET)
  - Summer (DST): UTC+02:00 (CEST)
- INSEE/Postal code: 30135 /30300
- ^{1} French Land Register data, which excludes lakes, ponds, glaciers > 1 km^{2} (0.386 sq mi or 247 acres) and river estuaries.

Jonquières-Saint-Vincent (French pronunciation: [ʒɔ̃kjɛʁ sɛ̃ vɛ̃sɑ̃]; Occitan: Jonquièra de Sent Vincenç) is a French commune located in the Gard department in Occitanie.

== Population ==
Historical population
Year	Pop.	±% p.a.
1968	1,445	—
1975	1,499	+0.53%
1982	1,825	+2.85%
1990	2,260	+2.71%
1999	2,745	+2.18%
2007	2,988	+1.07%
2012	3,522	+3.34%
2017	3,779	+1.42%
2023	3,875	+0.42%
Source: INSEE

== Twin towns – sister cities ==
Jonquières-Saint-Vincent is twinned with Vezza d'Alba, Italy.

== See also ==
- Communes of the Gard department
- Costières de Nîmes AOC
