= Beaucaire, Gard =

Commune in Occitania, France

Beaucaire Bèucaire (Occitan)
- Commune
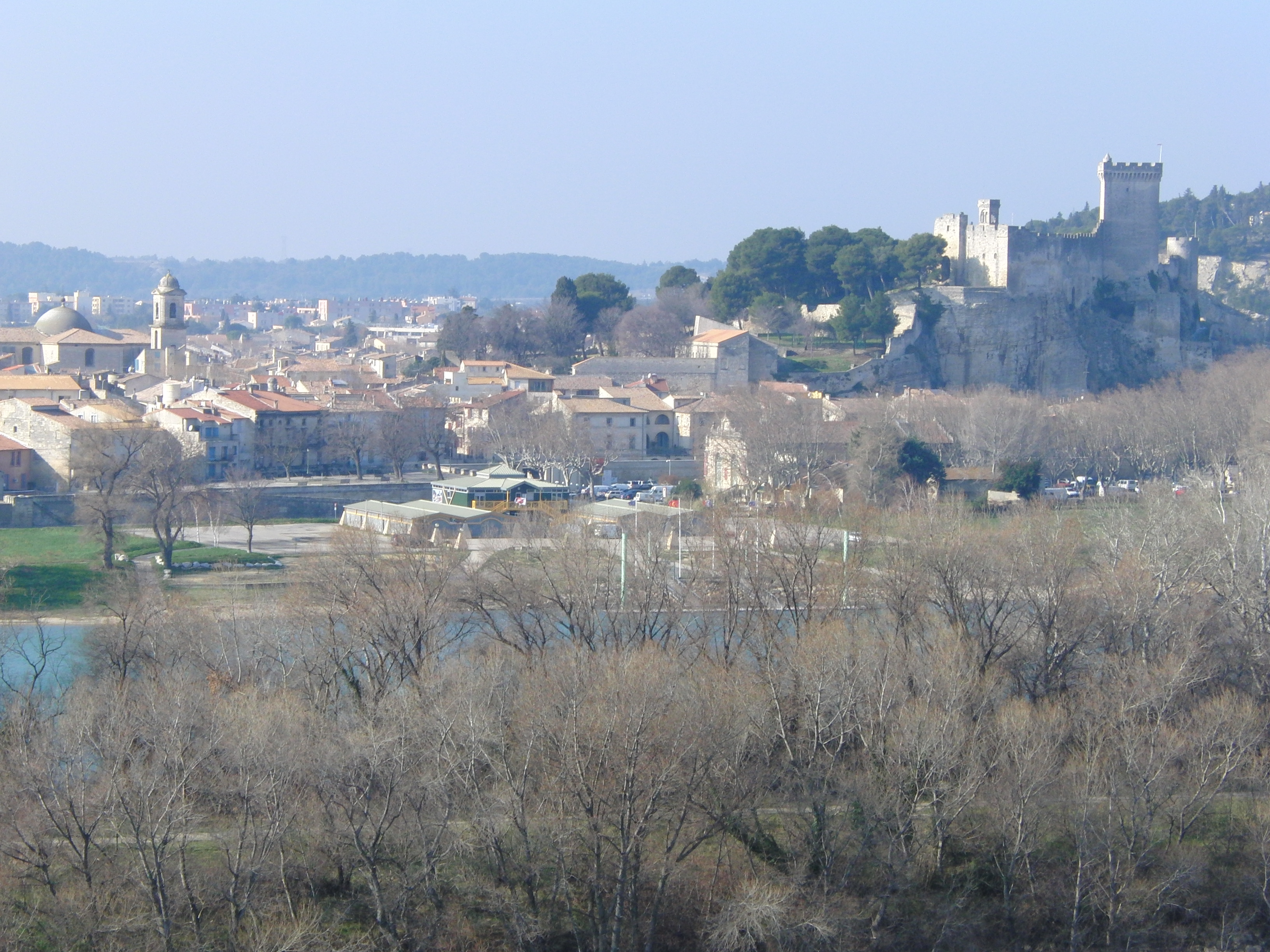
- View over Beaucaire

- Coat of arms
- Location of Beaucaire
- Location within France Location within Occitanie
- Coordinates: 43°48′29″N 4°38′39″E
- Country: France
- Region: Occitania
- Department: Gard
- Arrondissement: Nîmes
- Canton: Beaucaire
- Intercommunality: Beaucaire Terre d'Argence

Government
  - Mayor (2024–2026): Nelson Chaudon (RN)
- Area^{1}: 86.52 km^{2} (33.41 sq mi)
- Elevation: 18 m (59 ft)
- Highest elevation: 156 m (512 ft)
- Lowest elevation: 1 m (3.3 ft)
- Population (2023): 15,692
  - Density: 181.4/km^{2} (469.7/sq mi)
- Time zone: UTC+01:00 (CET)
  - Summer (DST): UTC+02:00 (CEST)
- INSEE/Postal code: 30032 /30300
- ^{1} French Land Register data, which excludes lakes, ponds, glaciers > 1 km^{2} (0.386 sq mi or 247 acres) and river estuaries.

Beaucaire (French pronunciation: [bokɛʁ]; Occitan and Provençal: Bèucaire [ˌbɛwˈkajɾe]) is a commune in the Gard department in the Occitanie region of Southern France.

In 2020, the commune was awarded one flower by the National Council of Towns and Villages in Bloom in the Competition of cities and villages in Bloom.

== Geography ==
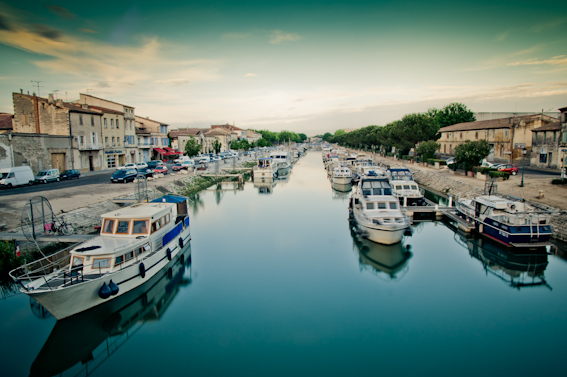
The Canal du Rhône à Sète at Beaucaire

Beaucaire is located on the River Rhône some 15 km south-west of Avignon and 10 km north of Arles. Across the river from Beaucaire lies Tarascon, which is in Bouches-du-Rhône department of Provence. Access to the commune is by the D999 road from Jonquières-Saint-Vincent in the west which passes through the north of the commune and the town and continues east to Tarascon. The D966L comes from Saint-Bonnet-du-Gard in the north and comes down the banks of the Rhône to the town. The D90 branches off the D986L in the commune and passes in a circle around the town then continues east across the Rhone changing to the D99B. The D15 goes south from the town to Fourques. The D38 goes south-west from the town to Bellegarde. The D28 links the Ile du Comte to the east bank of the Rhone. A railway passes through the commune coming from Tarascon in the east with a station in the commune then it continues to Nîmes in the west. Beaucaire station has rail connections to Nîmes, Avignon and Montpellier. Apart from the main town there are also the districts of Gaudon, Tour Saint-Pierre, Pauvre Menage, Malatrache, Mas du Consul, Mas Saint-Andre du Boschet, Mas de la Bastide, Mas des Lecques, Le Fer a Cheval, Saujean, Mas de Sicard, Bieudon, and Enclos d'Argent. The commune has a large urban area in the north-east with the rest of the commune farmland. There is also an extensive network of irrigation canals covering most of the farmland.

The Rhône river forms the whole eastern border of the commune as it flows south to join the sea at Port-Saint-Louis-du-Rhône. The river is also the departmental border between Gard and Bouches-du-Rhône. The Canal du Rhône à Sète passes through the commune from Saint-Gilles in the south-west and joins the Rhone in the town. Parallel to the Rhône on its eastern side is a canalised waterway called Laune de Pillet (the branch of the Rhone here called the Bras de Beaucaire). The Rhône and the waterway together create the Ile de Pillet. The river itself has not been navigable to the south since the creation of the Vallebregues barage in 1969; through traffic must navigate the Laune de Pillet. The river lock which once connected the Canal du Rhône à Sète to the Rhône has also been closed since 1969, but the lock is planned to reopen in due course. As it is the north-east arm of the Canal du Rhône à Sète is a cul-de-sac.

=== Terrain ===
The entire town is located in the Rhône Valley and has fairly flat terrain mainly formed by the plain of the Rhône. The north of the commune has hills, especially north of the town centre where the castle is located (80 metres high) as well as Saint-Roman (130 metres).n

== Name ==
Called Ugernum by the Romans, Beaucaire derived its modern name from the medieval Belli Quadrum, which described the pine-clad rock rising abruptly from the river.

Alternatively, 'Beaucaire' may be the French version of the Occitan language name 'Bèucaire':

- Beau < French beau ('Beautiful') < Occitan bèl/bèu ('Beautiful')
- Caire < Occitan caire ('Cut stone or rock') [in French pierre de taille].

Beaucaire appears as Beaucaire on the 1750 Cassini Map and the same on the 1790 version.

== History ==
=== Ancient time ===
Founded in the 7th century BC, Beaucaire was known as a city on the famous Via Domitia, the first Roman road built in Gaul linking Italy to Spain (121 BC.). It was at this point that the Via Domitia divides in the direction of Arles, Nîmes, Remoulins, and Saint-Gilles. At that time, Beaucaire was called Ugernum. This was where, after the capture of Rome by the Vandals in 455, the Gallo-Roman nobility met to elect Avitus as the new emperor. A Roman mausoleum has been discovered on the Île du Comté.

=== Middle Ages ===
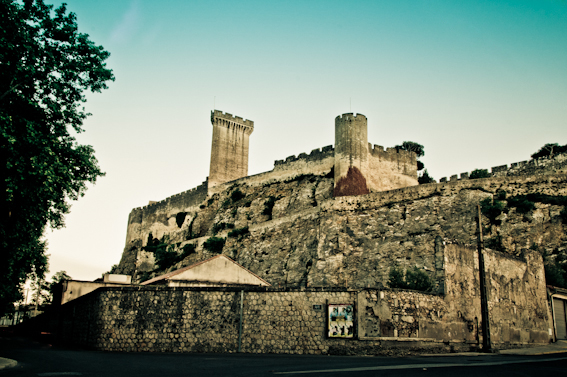
Château de Beaucaire, view from the north

The Middle Ages saw a slowdown in the expansion of the city. Beaucaire did not escape the troubles during this dark period. It underwent invasions of Burgundians, Visigoths, and Saracens. It was at that time that the first ramparts were built and the castle was expanded. The city took the name Beaucaire (which means "beautiful stone", probably in reference to its many buildings, to its quarries, or the fact that it had the first hills on the Rhone coming from the sea).

During the Albigensian Crusade, Raymond VII of Toulouse besieged Beaucaire in May 1216 to reclaim his father's property. The efforts of Simon de Montfort to relieve the town were repulsed. The city fell after a three-month siege.

In the 13th century Louis IX made several trips to Beaucaire. The city was expanding and its population increasing. Despite the Hundred Years War and the Wars of Religion (14th to the 16th century), the splendour and refinement of the architecture grew along with the wealth of the Beaucairois merchants.

In 1579 Beaucaire was held by Henri I de Montmorency, the catholic governor of Languedoc, but tolerant. The captain of the city was Jean de Parabere who was soon to play his own game. Damville then provoked a riot to recover the city but even though Parabere was decapitated, the city remained in the hands of the Huguenots, thanks to reinforcements sent by François de Coligny, the son of Gaspard II de Coligny.

=== Modern era ===
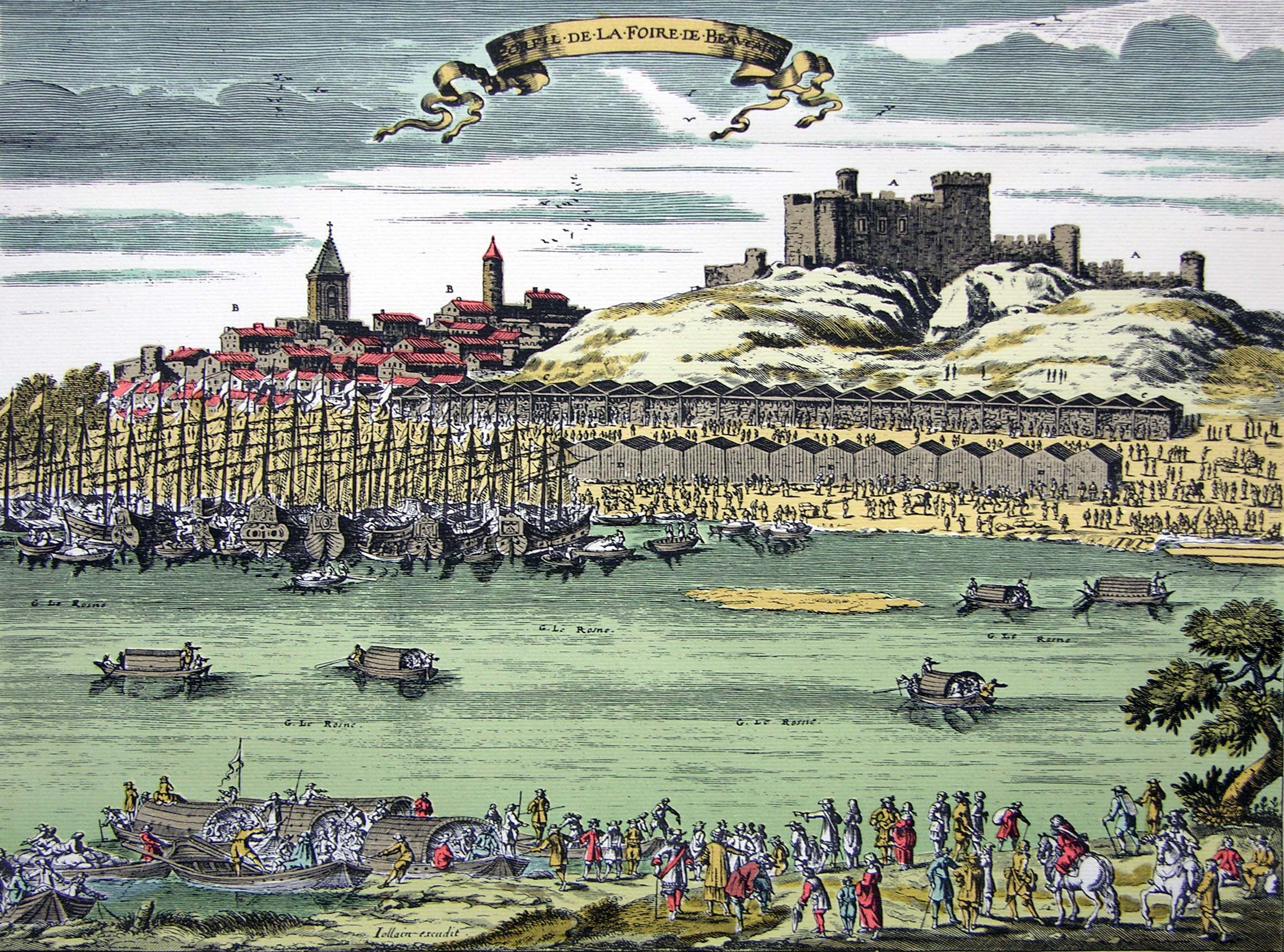
Beaucaire Fair, coloured engraving from the 18th century

At the end of the Hundred Years War in 1453, Charles VII of France declared that Beaucaire would become the site of the Fair of la Madeleine, a commercial fair that would enable the trade of goods from all of the Mediterranean Basin countries to all of France. By the mid-seventeenth century, the Fair was the largest commercial fair in the Mediterranean region, allegedly exceeding in a week the total volume of trade done in Marseilles in a year. It remained the dominant Mediterranean trade fair until the arrival of the railway in the mid-nineteenth century. The advent of the railway and the end of river trade as well as the removal of its tax-free status by Napoleon gradually destroyed the Fair of the Madeleine and plunged Beaucaire into anonymity. One result of these years of commercial dominance was the construction of a remarkable number of architecturally significant mansions and palaces by rich merchants of many nationalities. The fair still exists in the form of carnivals, bullfights, and various festivities. Camargue bulls are run through the streets. It always starts on 21 July and always ends on a Monday and lasts at least six days.

=== French Revolution and Empire ===
Beaucaire was capital of the district from 1790 to 1795. During the French Revolution the commune was temporarily called Pont-National.

=== Contemporary period ===
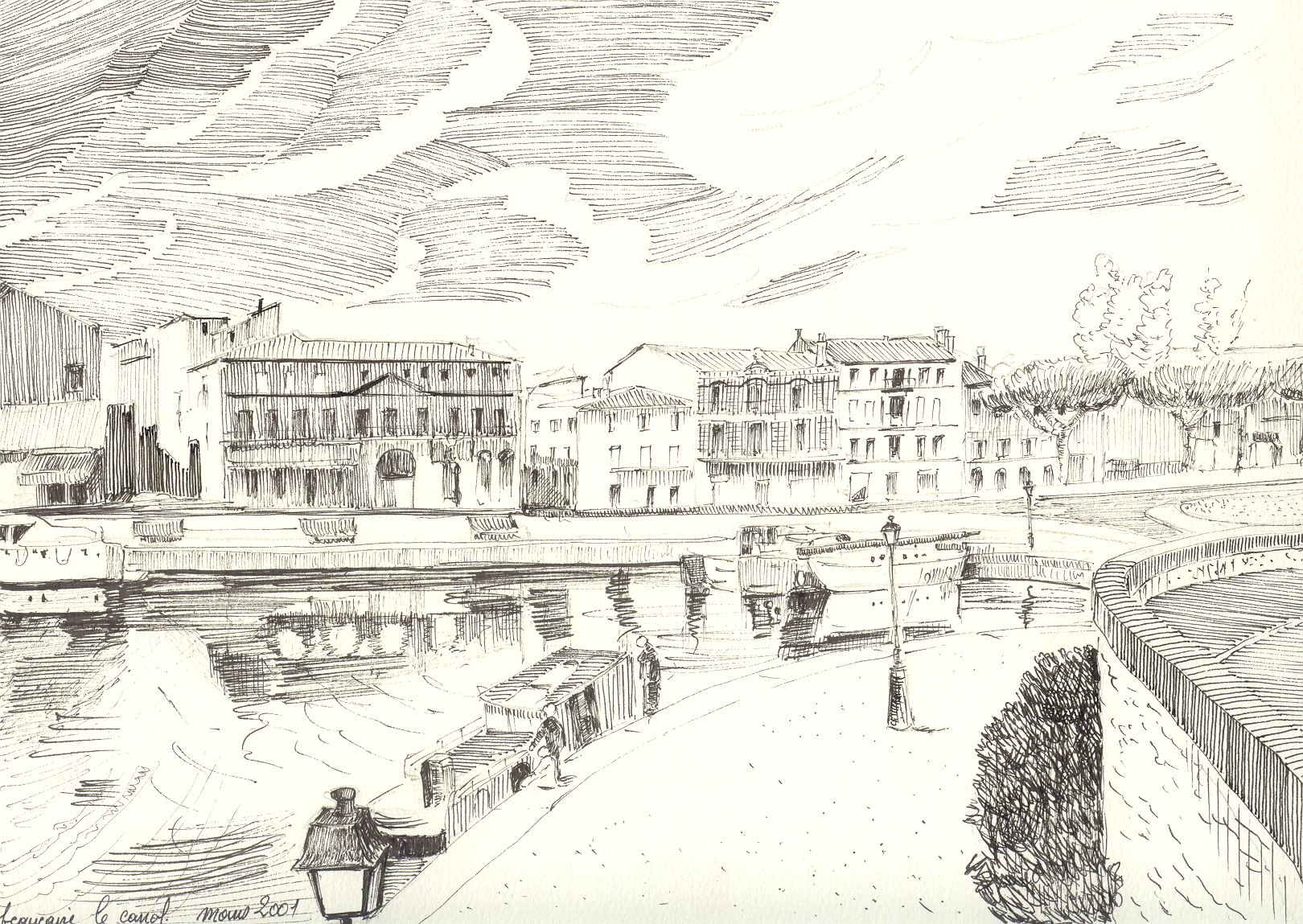
Pen drawing of the canal at Beaucaire

At the end of the 19th century and the early 20th century some works of great value are built such as the banquette - a stone retaining wall along the eastern side of the city which protected it from the flooding of the Rhône, food markets, and the Municipal Casino which is now the Festival Hall. It was also at this time that the Canal du Rhône à Sète was widened. It connects Beaucaire to the Canal du Midi.

In 1940 Beaucaire had a large population of Belgian refugees, mostly from Farciennes. They became twin communes in 1969. In 2016, they gained international attention for naming a street "Rue du Brexit" as a tribute to the United Kingdom voting to leave the European Union.

=== Heraldry ===
Arms of Beaucaire	Blazon: Party per saltire, Or and Gules.

== Town planning ==
Beaucaire is one of 79 member communes of the Territorial Coherence Scheme (SCOT) of South Gard and is also one of the 41 communes of Pays Garrigues Costières.

=== Housing ===
The town of Beaucaire had 7,769 housing units in 2017, 86% of which were primary residences. There are more single-family houses (55%) than apartments (44%) with the majority of homes having 3 or 4 rooms. 51% of residents own their own housing. Of the rental housing (3,148 units in 2017) 31% are HLM.

== Administration ==
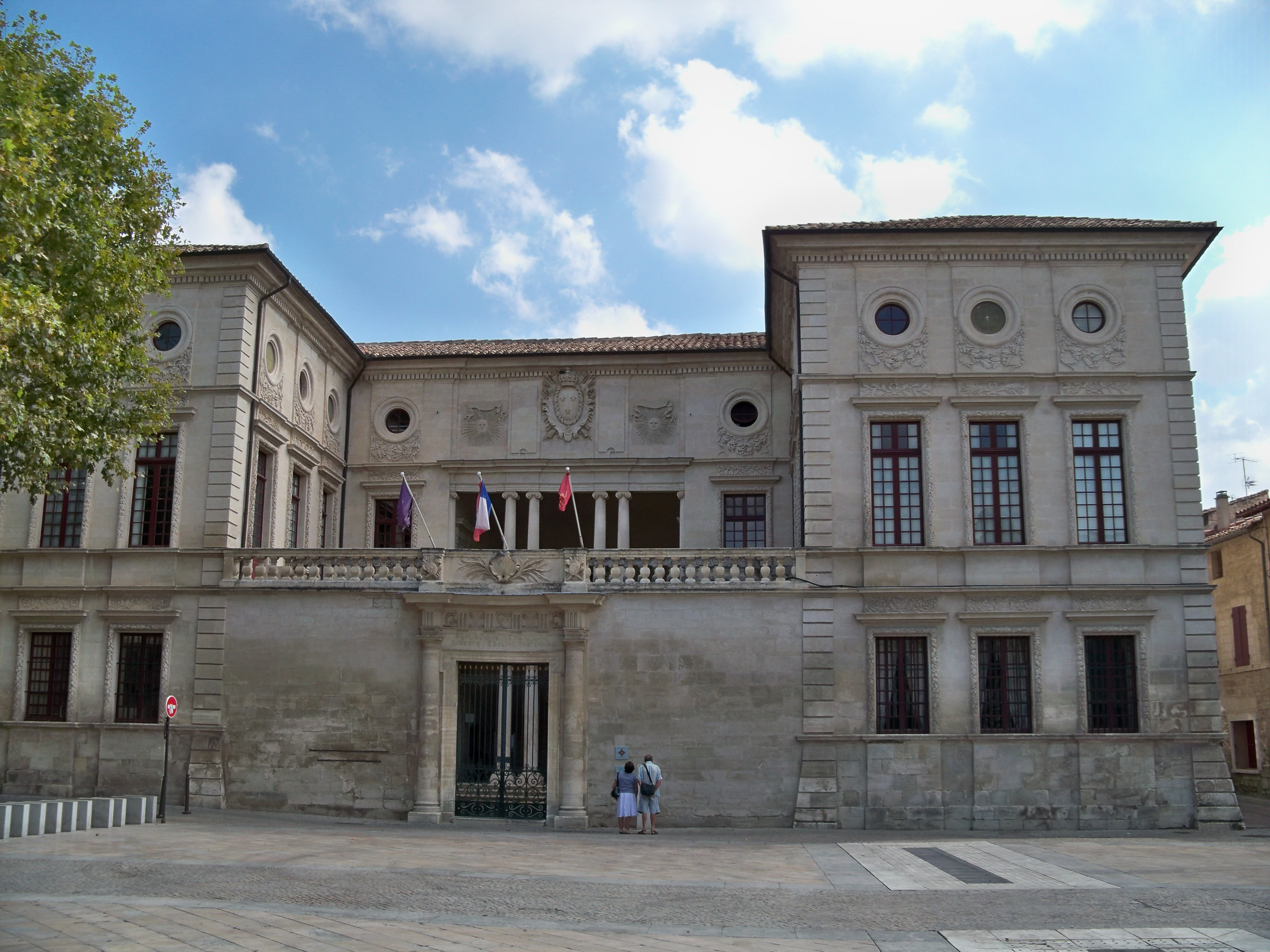
The Town Hall

List of Successive Mayors

From	To	Name	Party	Position
1742	1759	Antoine Nazon		
1945	1953	Maurice Sablier		
1953	1959	François Cestin		
1959	1983	José Boyer	PCF	General Councilor of the Canton of Beaucaire (1976-1982)
1983	2002	Jean-Marie André	DL	MP for Gard's 2nd constituency (1993-1997)
2002	2008	Mireille Cellier	UMP	Regional Councilor for Languedoc-Roussillon (1998-2010)
2008	2014	Jacques Bourbousson	UDI	President of the CC Beaucaire-Terre d'Argence (2008-2014)
2014	2024	Julien Sanchez	RN	Regional Councilor for Languedoc-Roussillon then Occitanie (since 2010)
2024	2026	Nelson Chaudon	RN	

The Municipal Council is composed of 23 members including the Mayor and 9 deputies.

=== Twinning ===
Beaucaire has twinning associations with:

- Farciennes (Belgium) since 1969.
- Montelupo Fiorentino (Italy).

== Demography ==
Its inhabitants are known as Beaucairois or Beaucairoises in French.

Historical population

Year	Pop.	±% p.a.
1793	8,510	—
1800	7,943	−0.98%
1806	8,671	+1.47%
1821	9,825	+0.84%
1831	9,967	+0.14%
1836	9,601	−0.75%
1841	9,795	+0.40%
1846	9,725	−0.14%
1851	11,045	+2.58%
1856	12,713	+2.85%
1861	9,544	−5.57%
1866	9,395	−0.31%
1872	8,804	−1.08%
1876	8,777	−0.08%
1881	9,724	+2.07%
1886	9,824	+0.20%
1891	8,947	−1.85%
1896	9,020	+0.16%
1901	9,143	+0.27%

Year	Pop.	±% p.a.
1906	8,764	−0.84%
1911	8,488	−0.64%
1921	7,916	−0.70%
1926	8,479	+1.38%
1931	9,701	+2.73%
1936	10,059	+0.73%
1946	9,343	−0.74%
1954	10,197	+1.10%
1962	11,061	+1.02%
1968	12,740	+2.38%
1975	12,829	+0.10%
1982	12,840	+0.01%
1990	13,400	+0.54%
1999	13,748	+0.29%
2007	15,274	+1.32%
2012	15,860	+0.76%
2017	15,963	+0.13%
2023	15,692	−0.28%

Source: EHESS and INSEE

=== Education ===
The commune has:

- 4 kindergartens
- 5 Elementary schools
- 2 primary schools
- 3 colleges
- 2 professional schools

=== Health ===
Since 30 January 2014 Beaucaire has a multi-activity healthcare division with multi care professionals, a dental centre, opticians, and a hearing specialist.

=== Cultural events and festivities ===
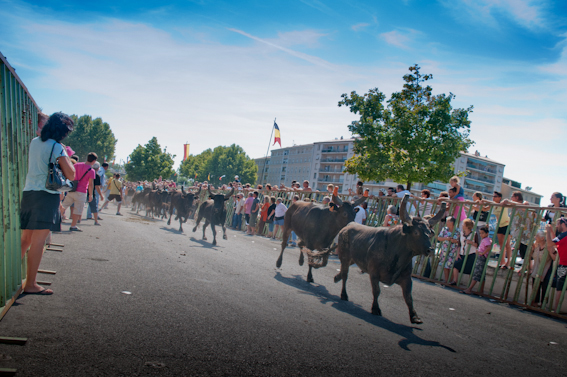
The releasing of the bulls in the streets of Beaucaire

- The Salon des Métiers d'Art is held every year in October. Many craftsmen are selected and come to exhibit their original works. Since 2015, this event has taken place in the conservation area of ??Beaucaire on the Place Georges Clemenceau and also in the inner courtyard of the Town Hall and its Conservatory.
- The Mediterranean Equestrian Meeting is held every year on the first weekend in July. Hundreds of horses from all over Europe meet in Beaucaire. This event diversified in 2015 with a children's area to introduce children and attract families. This huge demonstration, whose total cost is around 100,000 euros, has not been subsidized by the regional council since 2015. Despite the decline in endowment, the commune still maintains it and gives it more scope.
- The City of books since 2007. It hosts publishers, booksellers and organizes a festival of storytelling.
- The Summer Festivals have events such as bullfighting and cultural shows. The city is a member of the Union of French bullfighting cities.
- Le Drac from 20 to 22 June each year. A celebration of the myth of Le Drac. The townsfolk bring the monster to life in the form of a long procession which snakes through the town led by a swarm of children carrying lanterns.

=== Worship ===
The Catholic parish of Beaucaire is part of on the diocese of Nîmes, deanery Plaine gardoise. Protestants also have a church in the commune. There is a Mosque for Moslems.

== Economy ==
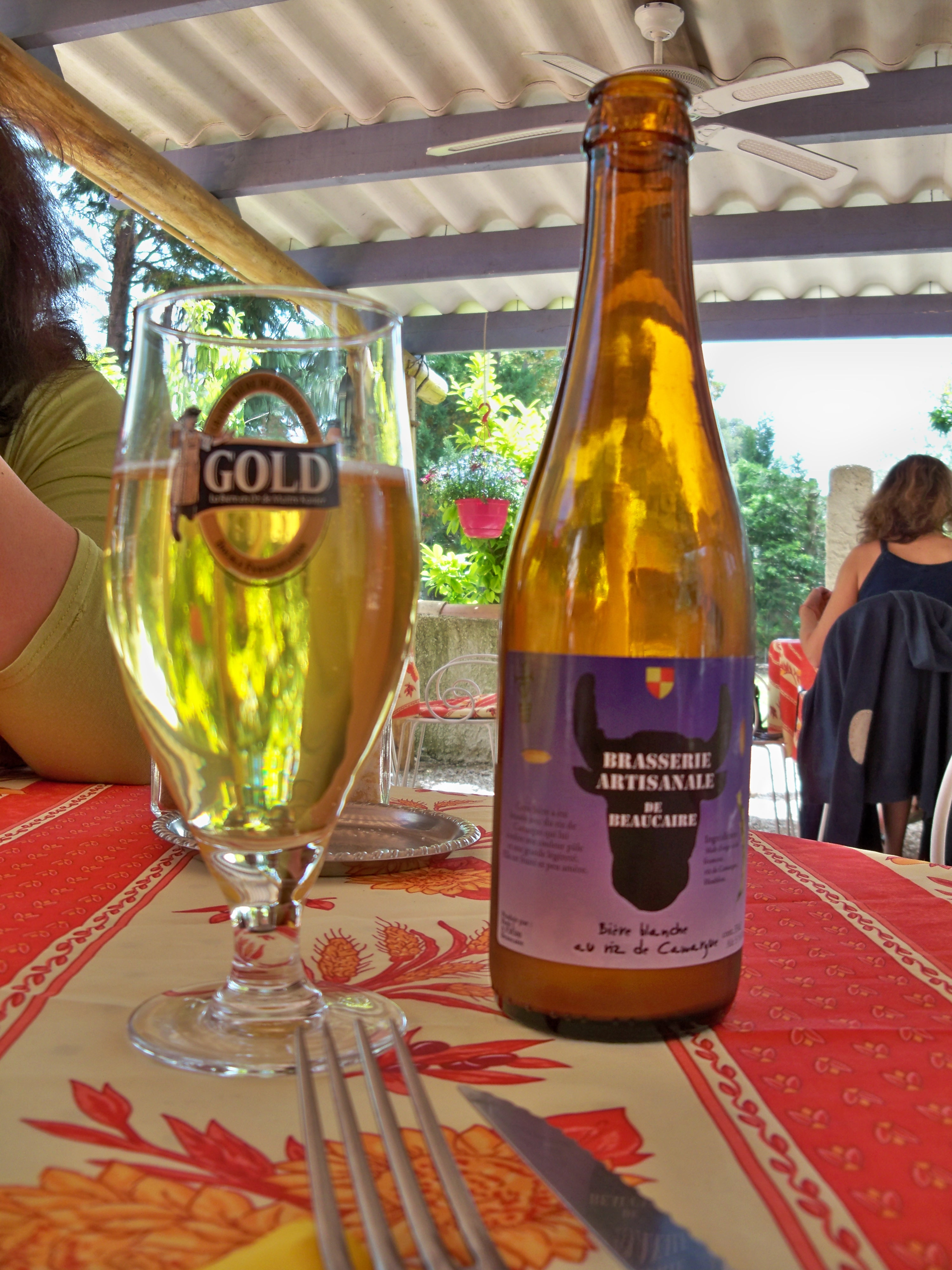
White beer of Beaucaire, with Camargue rice

=== Population and income tax ===
In 2017 the workforce was 6,726 people, including 1,601 unemployed (23.8%). These people are mostly employees (85.1%) and most work outside the commune (57%). At the end of 2015 there were a total of 1,544 business enterprises in the commune: 152 in agriculture, 128 in industry, 226 in construction, 851 in Trade, transport, and services (of which 303 in automobile trade and repair), and 170 in administration, education, health, or social services.

=== Notable businesses in the commune ===
Among local businesses, the Craft Brewery of Beaucaire produces and markets several varieties of beer regionally with some Camargue rice. There are also: a Ciments français cement plant (subsidiary of the Italcementi group), and a Casanis plant from the Bacardi group which markets Get 27. The headquarters of the multinational group Marie Brizard Wine & Spirits (formerly Belvédère) has been located in Beaucaire since 2011.

== Culture and heritage ==
A large number of buildings and sites in Beaucaire are registered as historical monuments, including:

- Chateau de Beaucaire and its triangular Keep.
- Many Mansions and facades from the 17th and 18th century.
- Taureau Cocardier (Cocardier bull) Goya, a sculpture by Camille Soccorsi (1984) in the Place Jean-Jaurès.
- Paul Laurent bullring where are held bullfight events, and shows and concerts during the feria of Sainte-Madeleine.
- Sculpture of Drac in the Place de la Republique.
- Vieux Mas, a farmhouse from 1900.
- Columns of Caesar. On the plateau north-west of the town, near the cemetery, lie milestones from the ancient Via Domitia. Consisting of a single stone, they are positioned to the right of the way in the direction Beaucaire-Narbonne. There are many due to the addition of a new milestone in the name of the emperor reigning at each significant repair. These multiple milestones are called the Columns of Caesar.
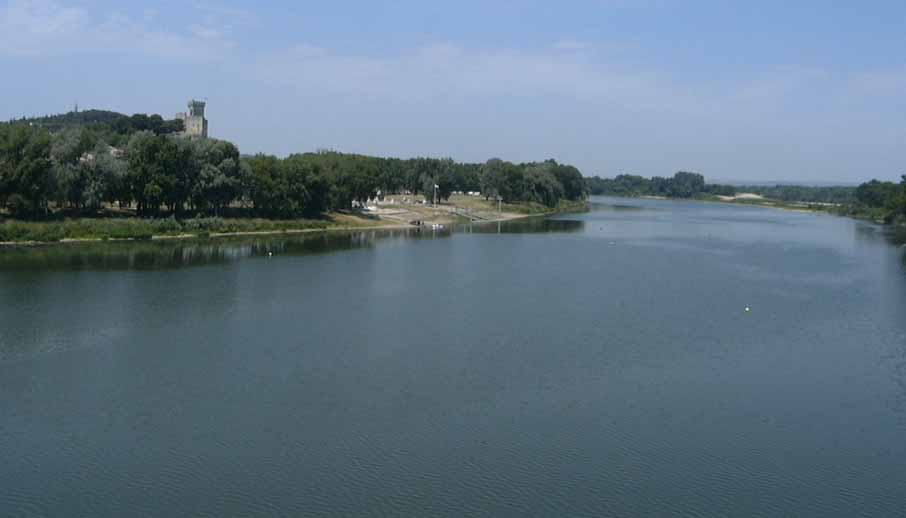
The Rhône and the Château of Beaucaire

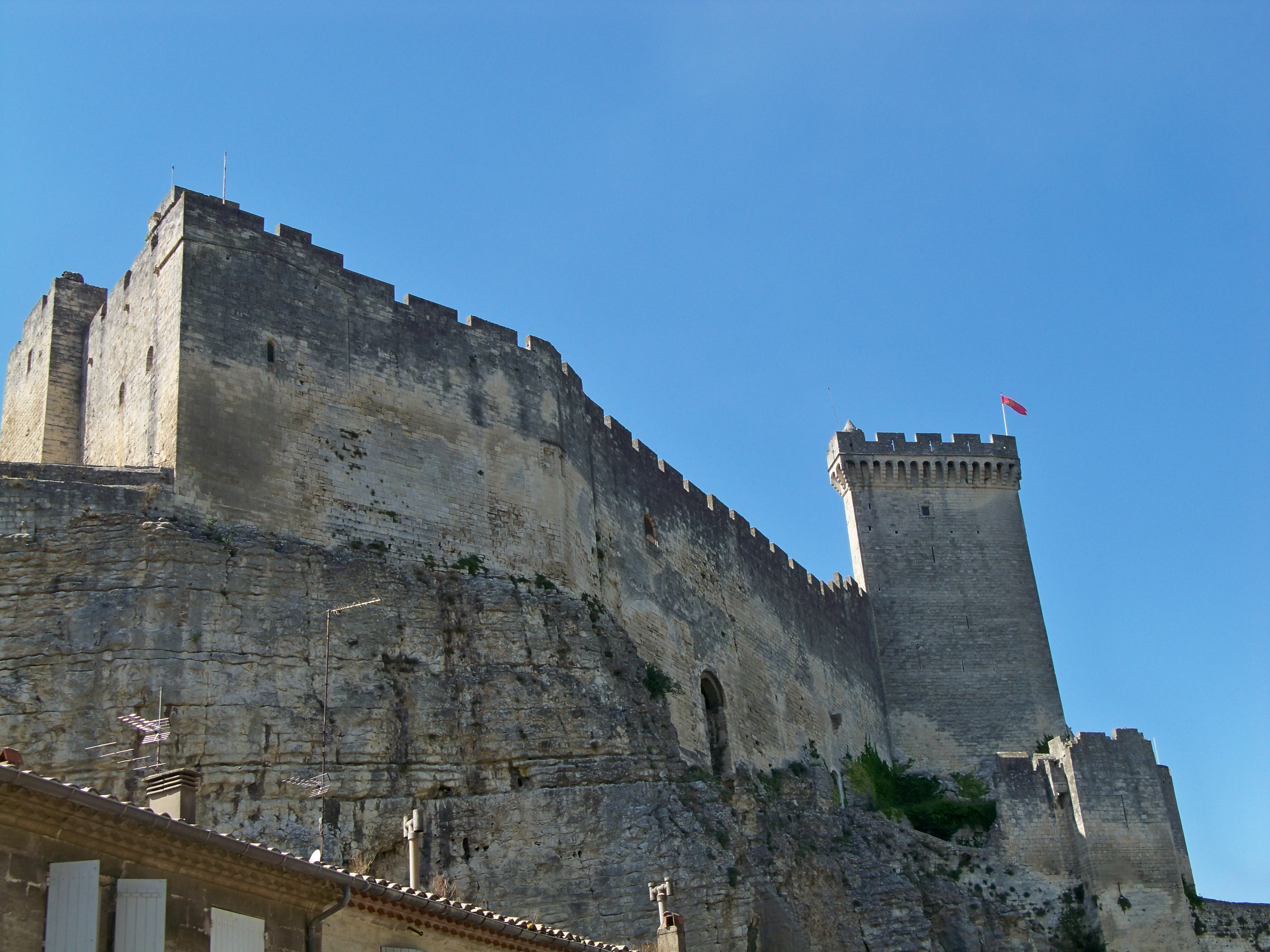
Château de Beaucaire

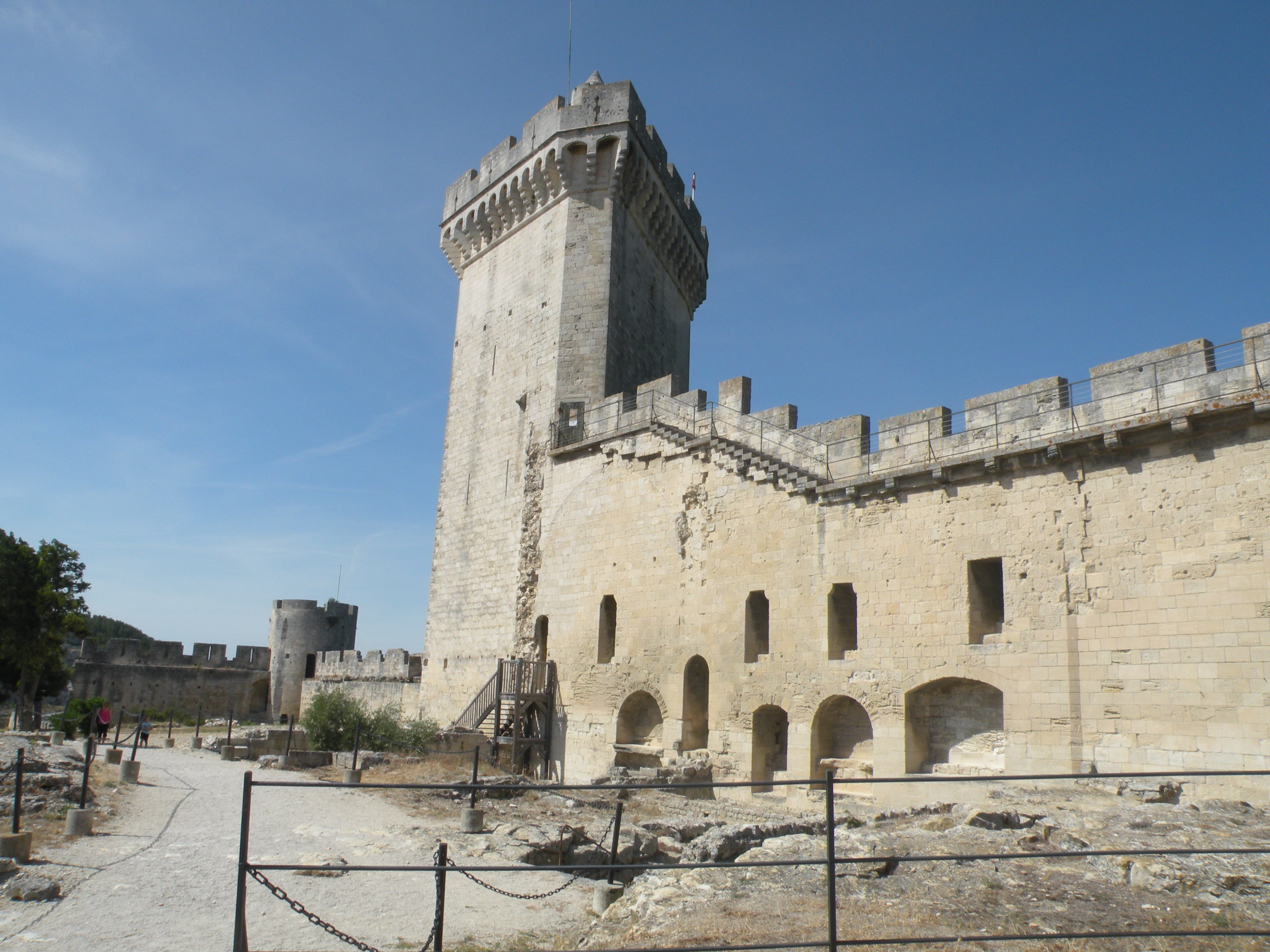
Triangular keep of the Chateau of Beaucaire

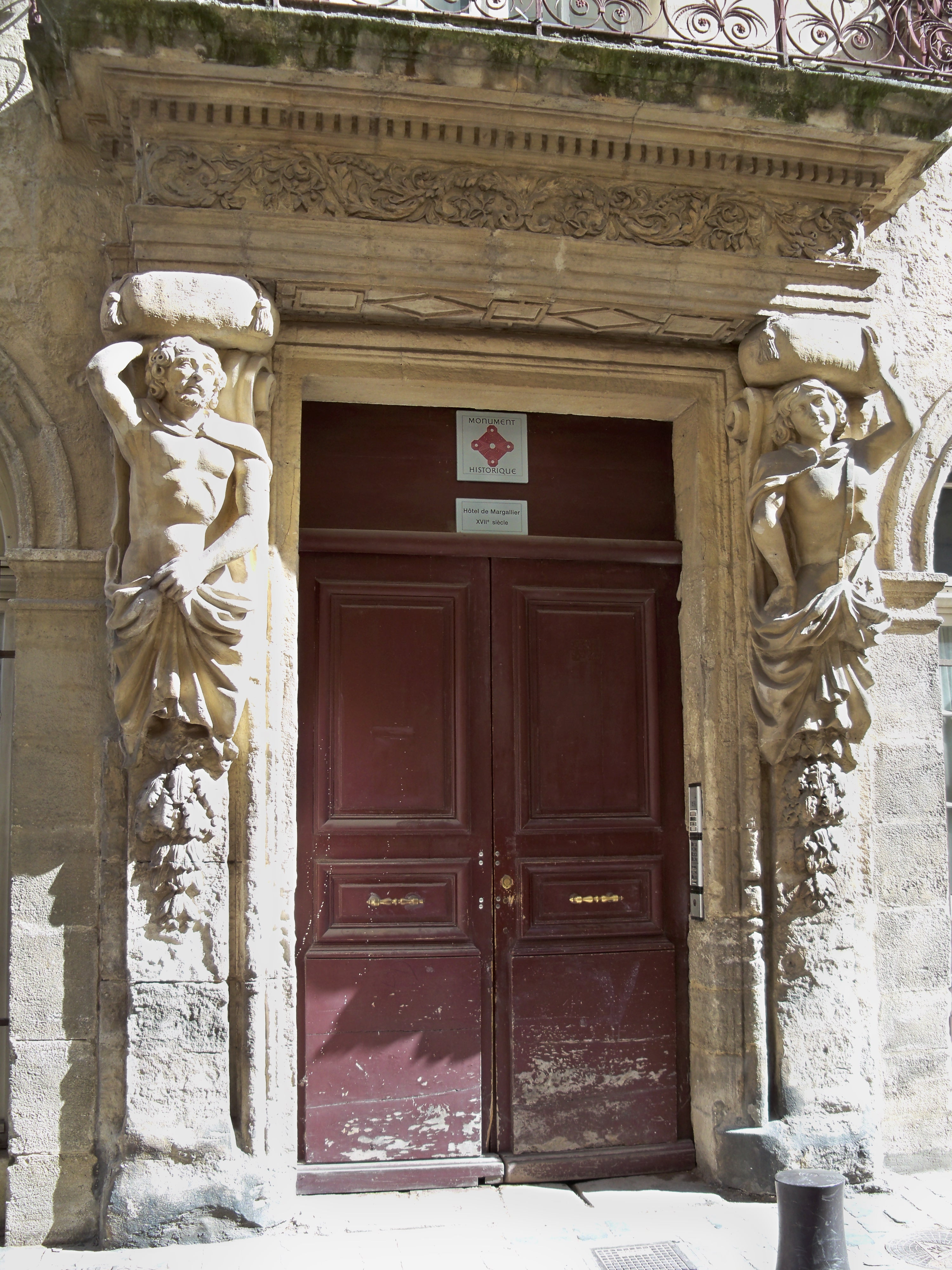
Hotel of Margallier

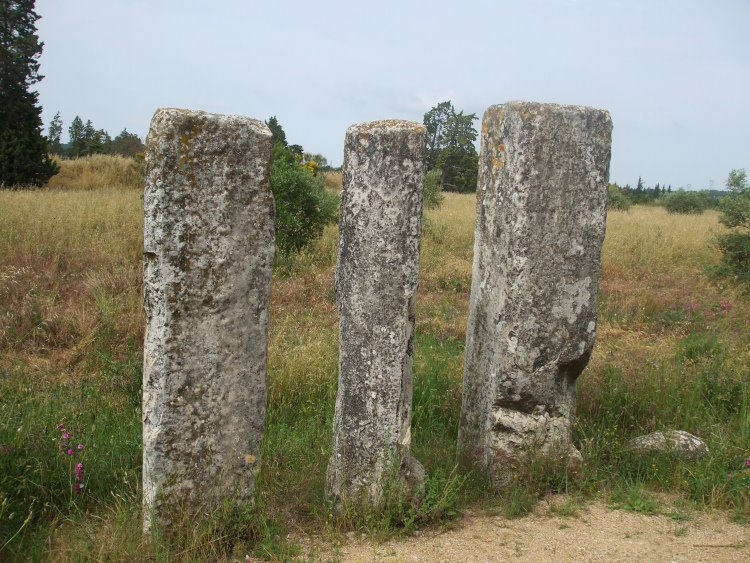
Columns of Caesar

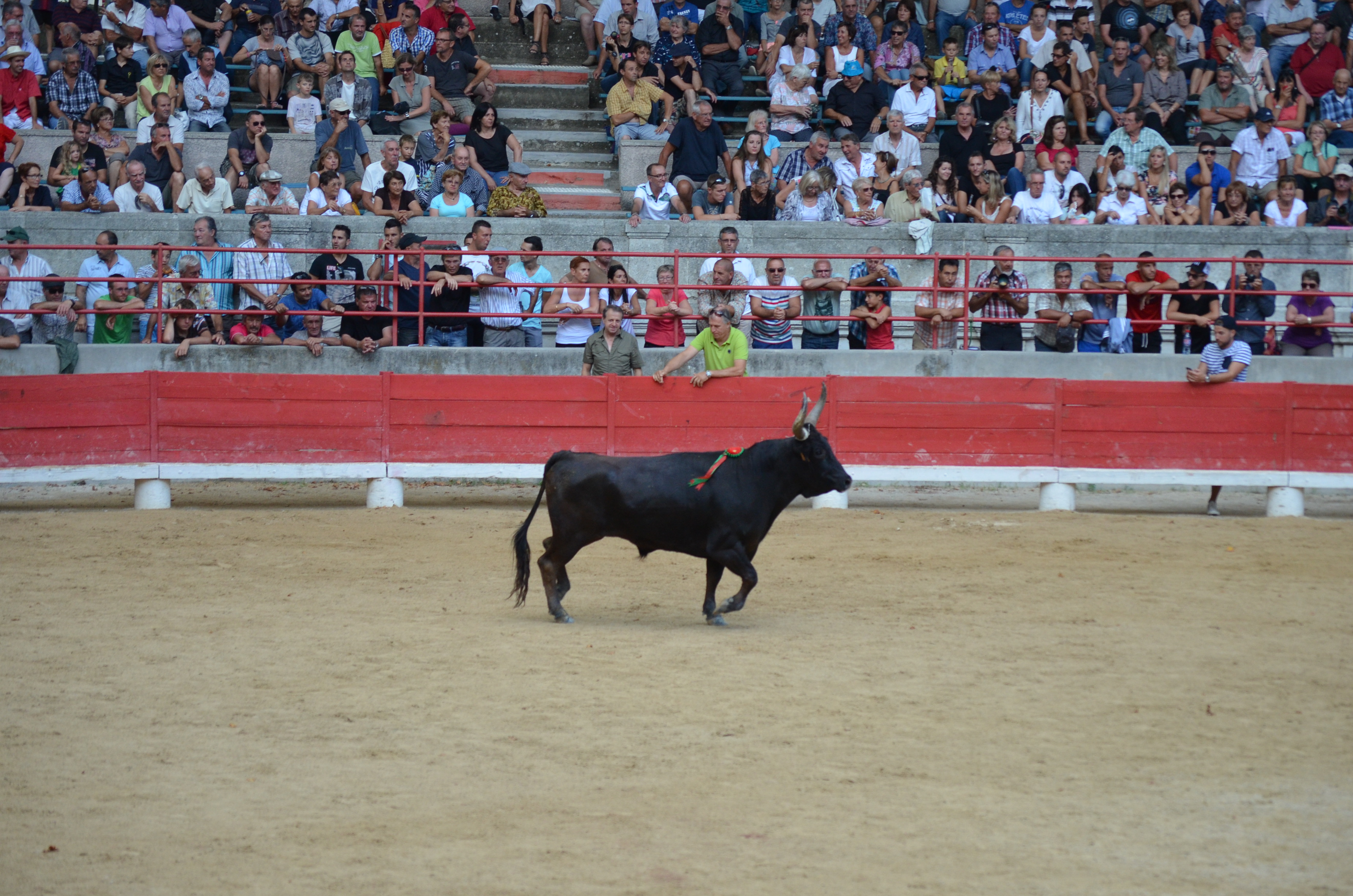
Bullring

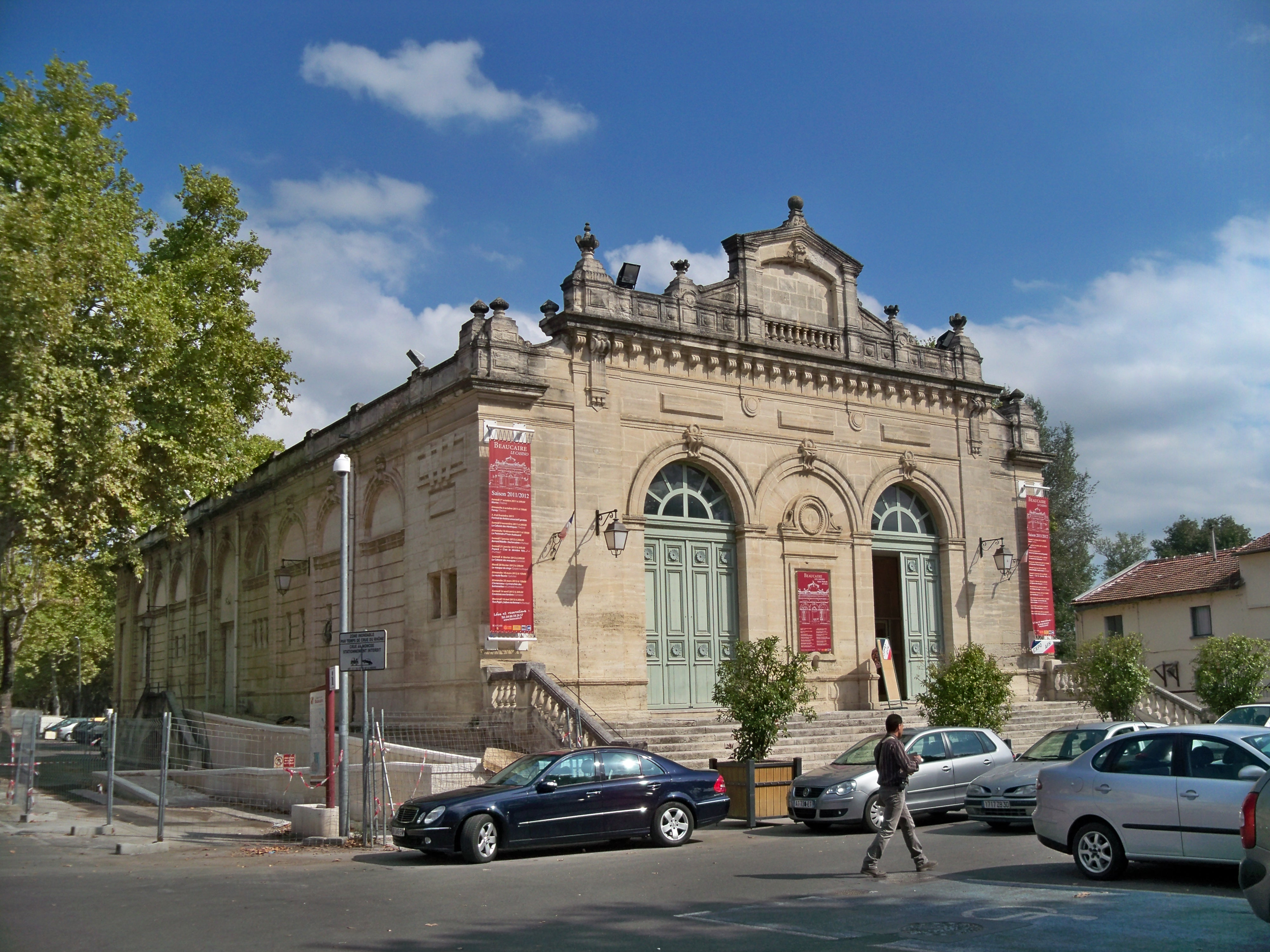
Beaucaire Casino

=== Religious heritage ===
- The Troglodytic Abbey of Saint-Roman: atop a limestone outcrop overlooking the Rhone valley at the confluence of the Gardon. This cave monastery, which depended on Psalmody Abbey was abandoned in the 16th century. A fortress was later built partly with stones from the abbey. It was dismantled in 1850 and only a few vestiges of the fortifications are still visible.
- The Collegiate Church of Notre-Dame-des-Pommiers dating from the 18th century, the largest church in the city, baroque.
- The Church of Saint Paul, built in the Provençal Gothic style.
- An Oratory in memory of Saint Bonaventure and the Virgin; Second Empire period; near Place Jean-Jaurès and the road to Nîmes.
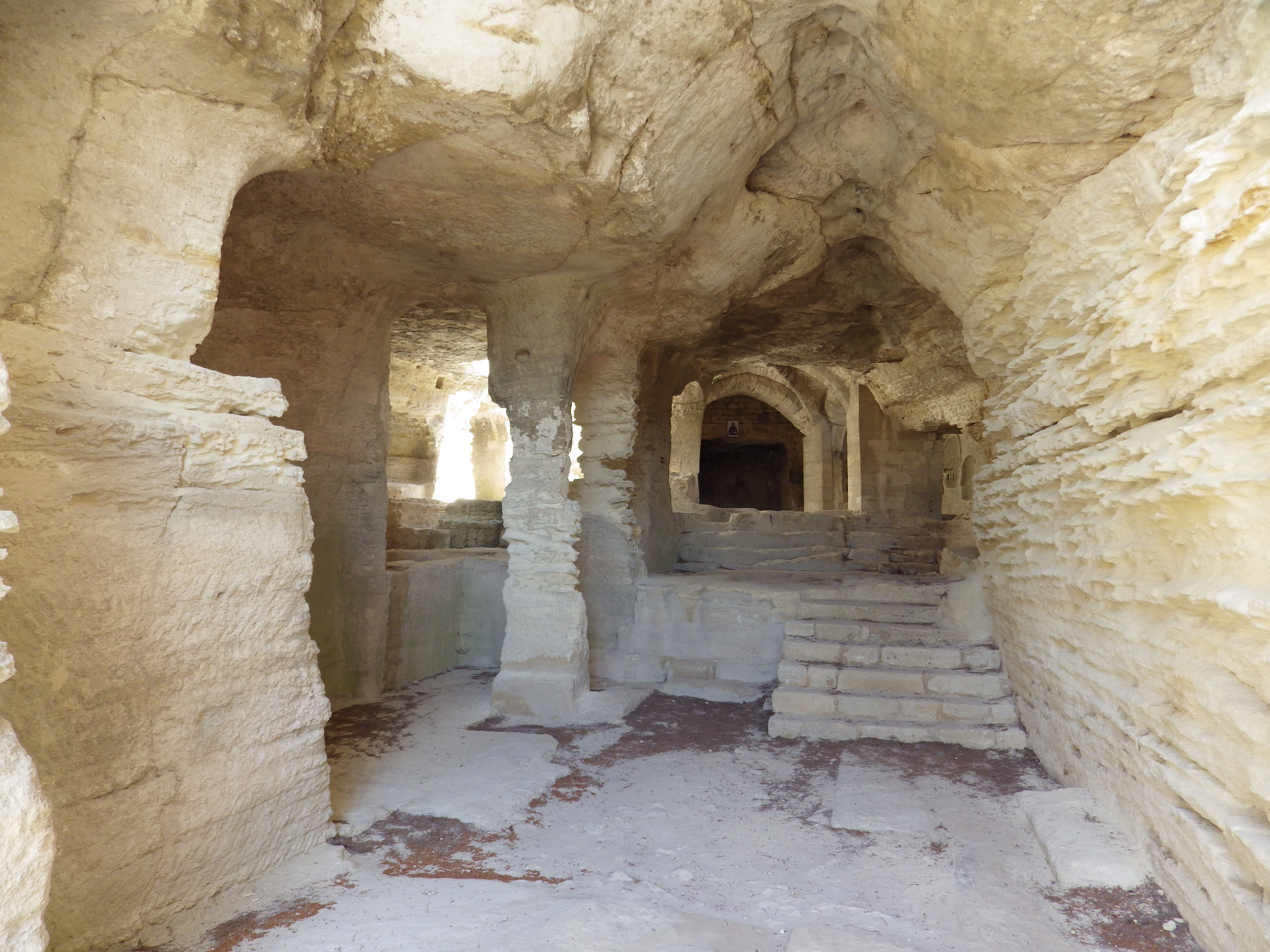
Abbey of Saint-Roman

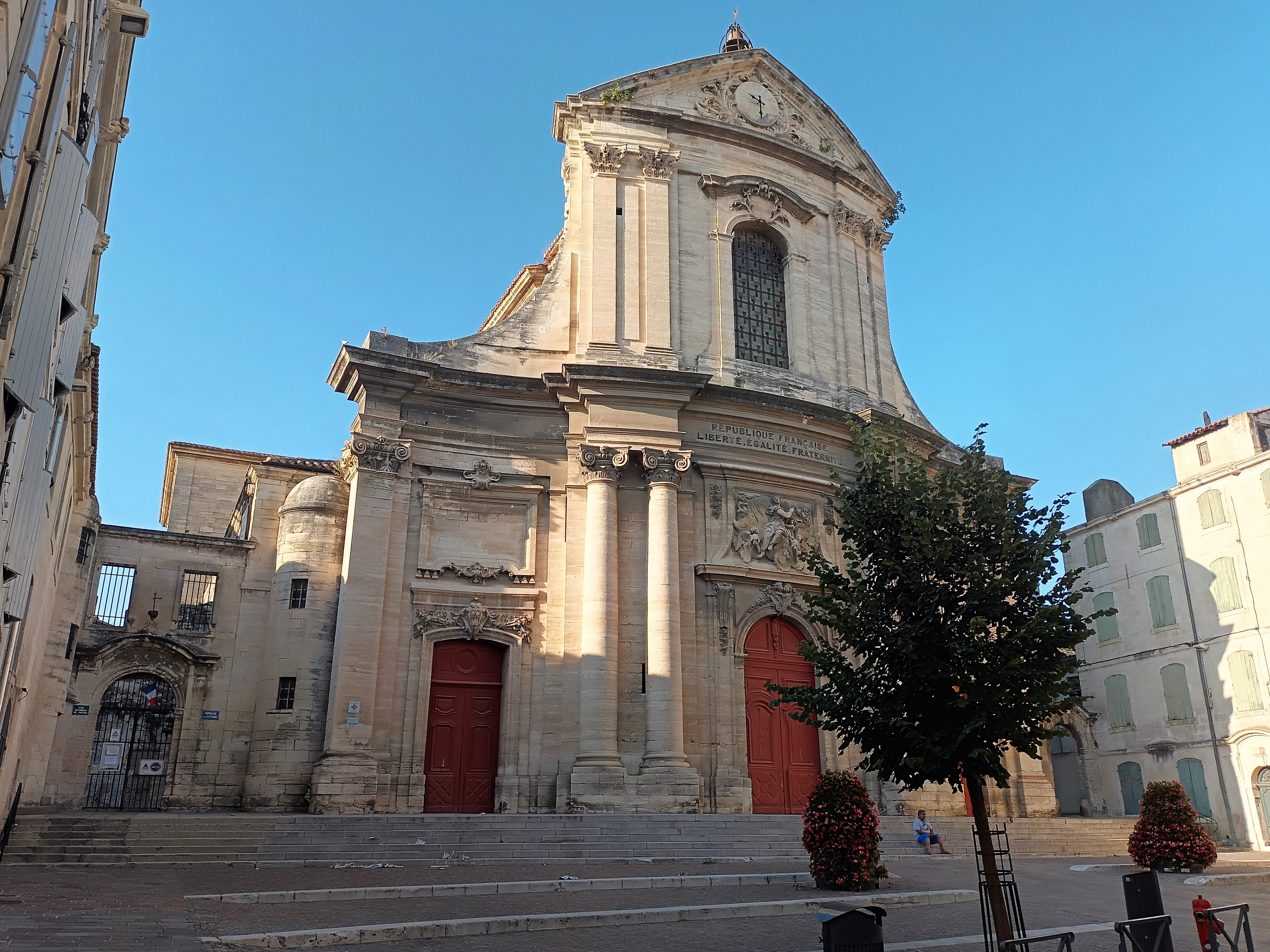
Collegiate church of Notre-Dame-des-Pommiers

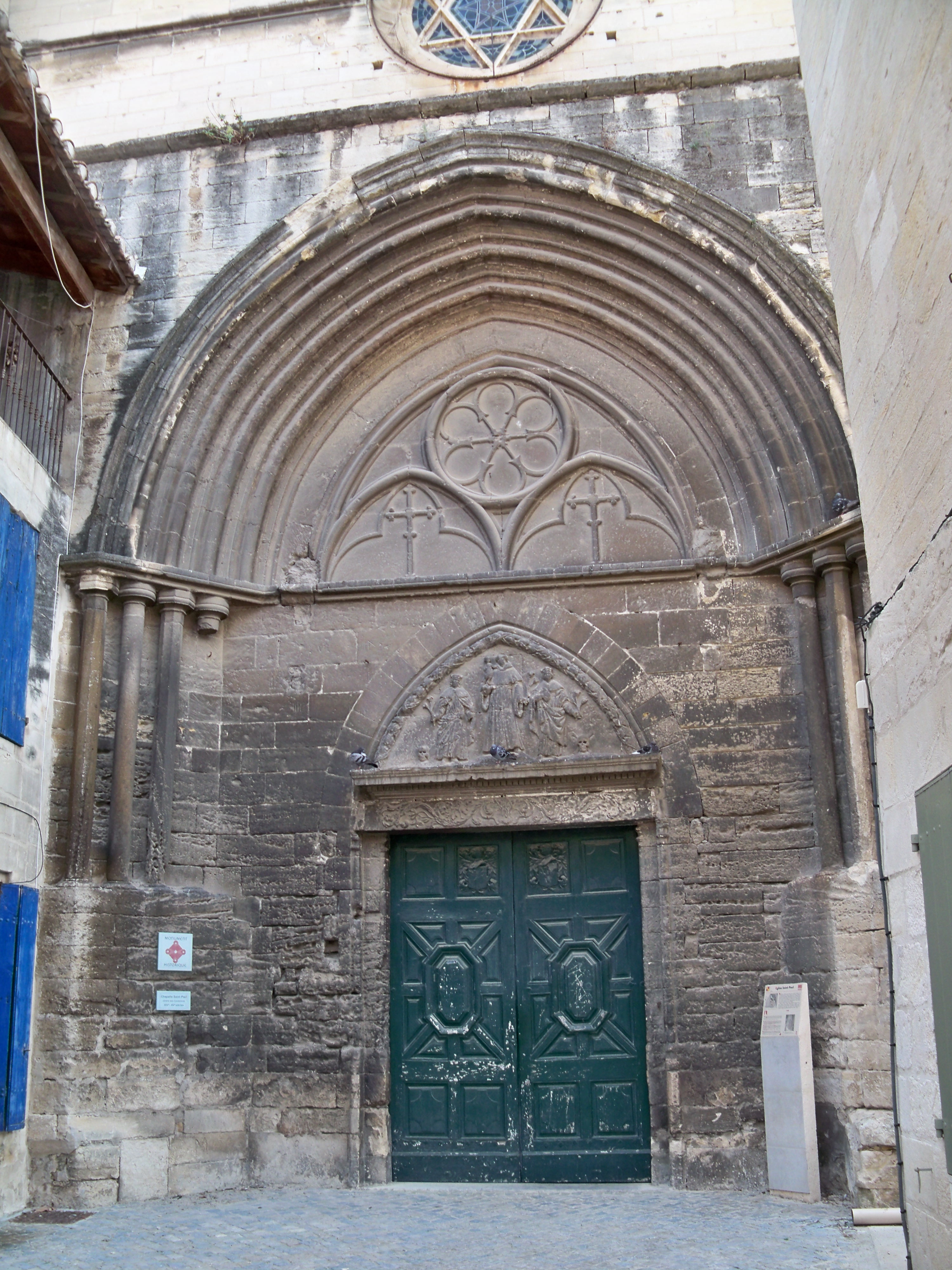
Church of Saint Paul
(western portal)

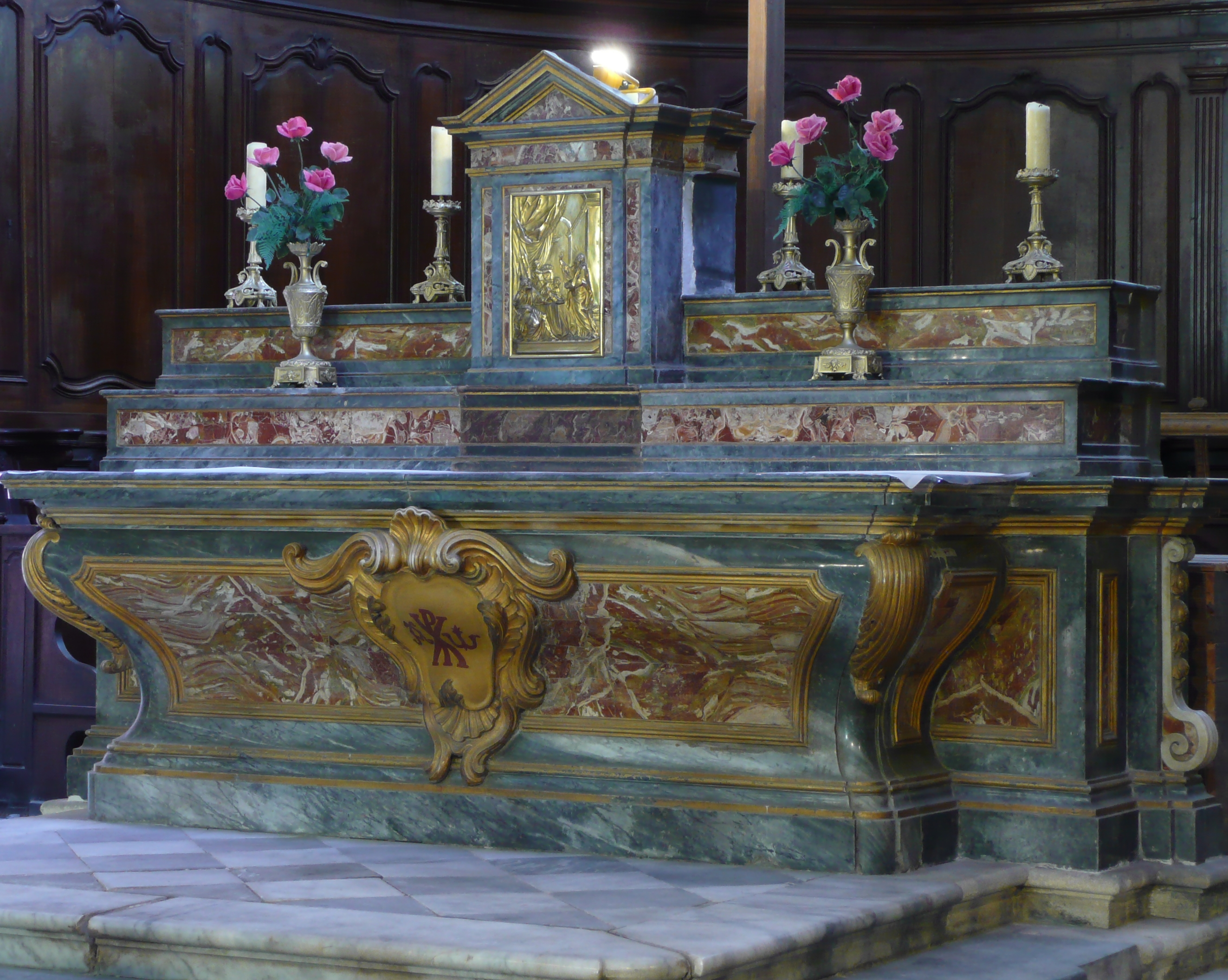
Church of Saint Paul
(main altar)

=== Croix Couverte de Beaucaire ===
- 43°48′6.2″N 4°38′0.2″E

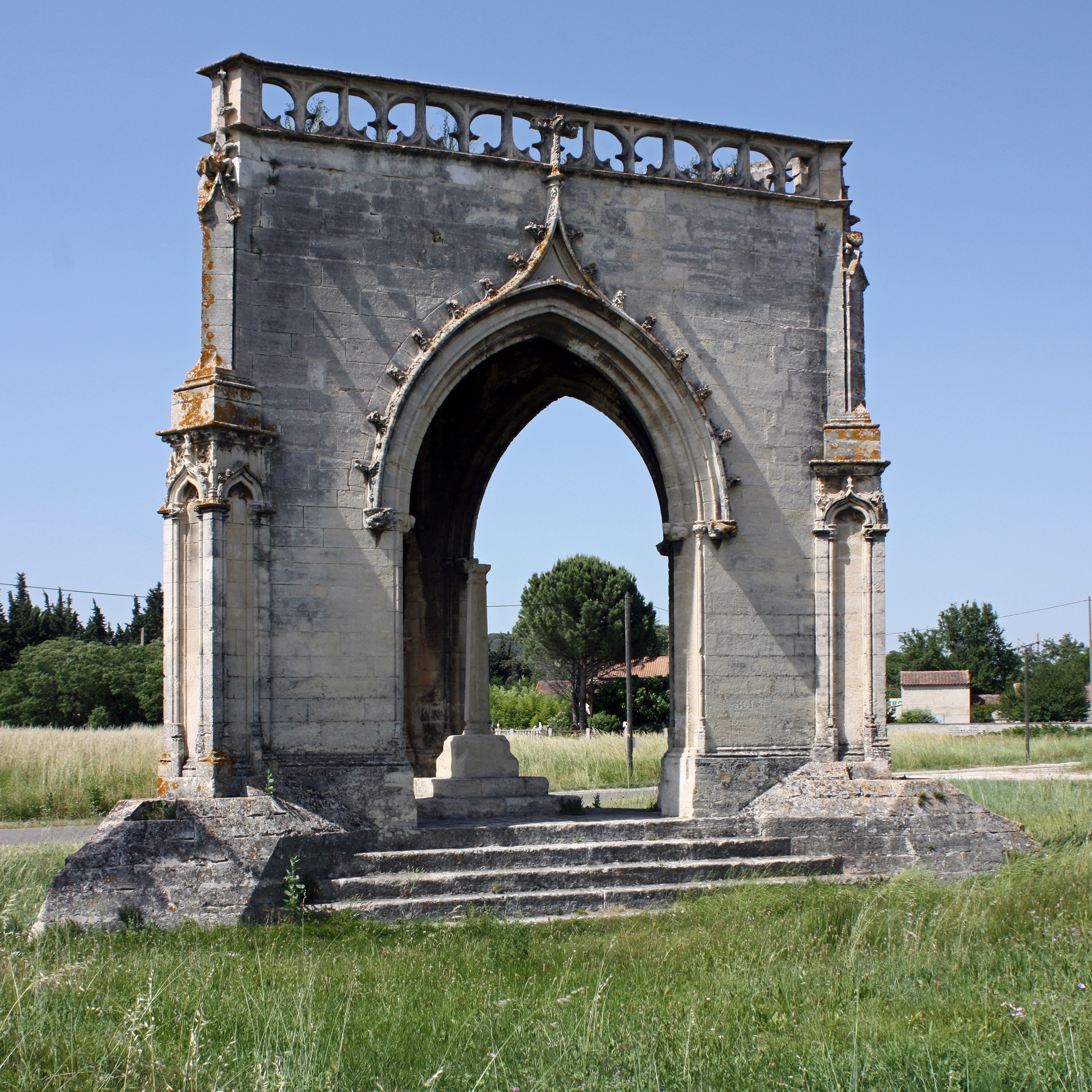
Oratory of the Covered Cross

The Croix Couverte de Beaucaire, or the Covered Cross, is a 14th-century stone oratory located in Beaucaire at what is now the intersection of the Route to Fourques and the Chemin de Beauvoir. The monument has three faces rising off a triangular base, each with a large Gothic arched opening and an open stone balustrade at the top.

The vaulted space holds the support for a stone cross, the oratory's original cross is now located in the Auguste Jacquet Museum at the Château de Beaucaire. Classified as a historical monument since October 10, 1906, the structure was likely built by John, Duke of Berry, Governor of Languedoc.

In 2019, the commune of Beaucaire inaugurated a program to study the monument and create a plan to repair damage to the stonework, improve adjacent drainage, relocate adjacent power poles and lines, and make general improvements to the site.

=== Museums ===
- The Auguste-Jacquet Museum: a museum of history, archeology and traditions of Beaucaire. Located in the former convent of the Augustinian sisters at the foot of the medieval castle.
- The Horse and Equestrian Art Museum, Hall of the Four Kings, Rue du 4 September.

=== Literature ===
Poets, living in or passing through Beaucaire, remembered it through their lyrical writing: Joseph D'Arbaud, Marie-Antoinette Rivière (Antoinette of Beaucaire), Juliette Borely, Artalette of Beaucaire.

=== Legend ===
Beaucaire has a legend of the formidable drac, a monster that rises from the depths of the sea to seize and devour its prey. One day the monster grabbed a young laundress and brought her to his cave. The story says the woman expected the worst, but the drac explained that what he wanted was a nanny for his son, the draconnet. Thus the washerwoman fed the little monster for seven years before she was set free. But one day at the fair the drac came to the market, having taken on a human appearance. The washerwoman recognized her former captor and incited the crowd to riot. Furious at being unmasked, the drac blinded the washerwoman. According to Gervase of Tilbury who wrote this tale in 1214, she remained blinded until the end of her days.

== Notable people linked to the commune ==
- Raymond VII, Count of Toulouse (1197-1249) returned Beaucaire, his birthplace, to the lords of Nord in 1216;
- Jacques Cœur (around 1395/1400-1456), took refuge in 1455;
- François de Rovérié de Cabrières (1830-1921), Bishop of Montpellier then cardinal;
- Napoleon Bonaparte, author of Souper de Beaucaire;
- (Jean-)Pierre Blaud (1773/74-1859), inventor of Blaud's pills;
- Noël Vandernotte (1923-), retired author, youngest athlete in the history of the modern Olympic Games ad vitam æternam (Medal in 1936 as a rowing coxswain);
- Johnny Ecker (1973-), professional footballer professionnel for Nîmes Olympique, Lille OSC, Olympique de Marseille, EAG

== See also ==
- Canal du Rhône à Sète
- Communes of the Gard department
- Costières de Nîmes AOC
- History of Jerusalem during the Kingdom of Jerusalem: the southwest gate of the Crusader city was called Beaucaire Gate after the Provencals who stormed the city walls in this area in 1099
