= Gardon d'Alès =

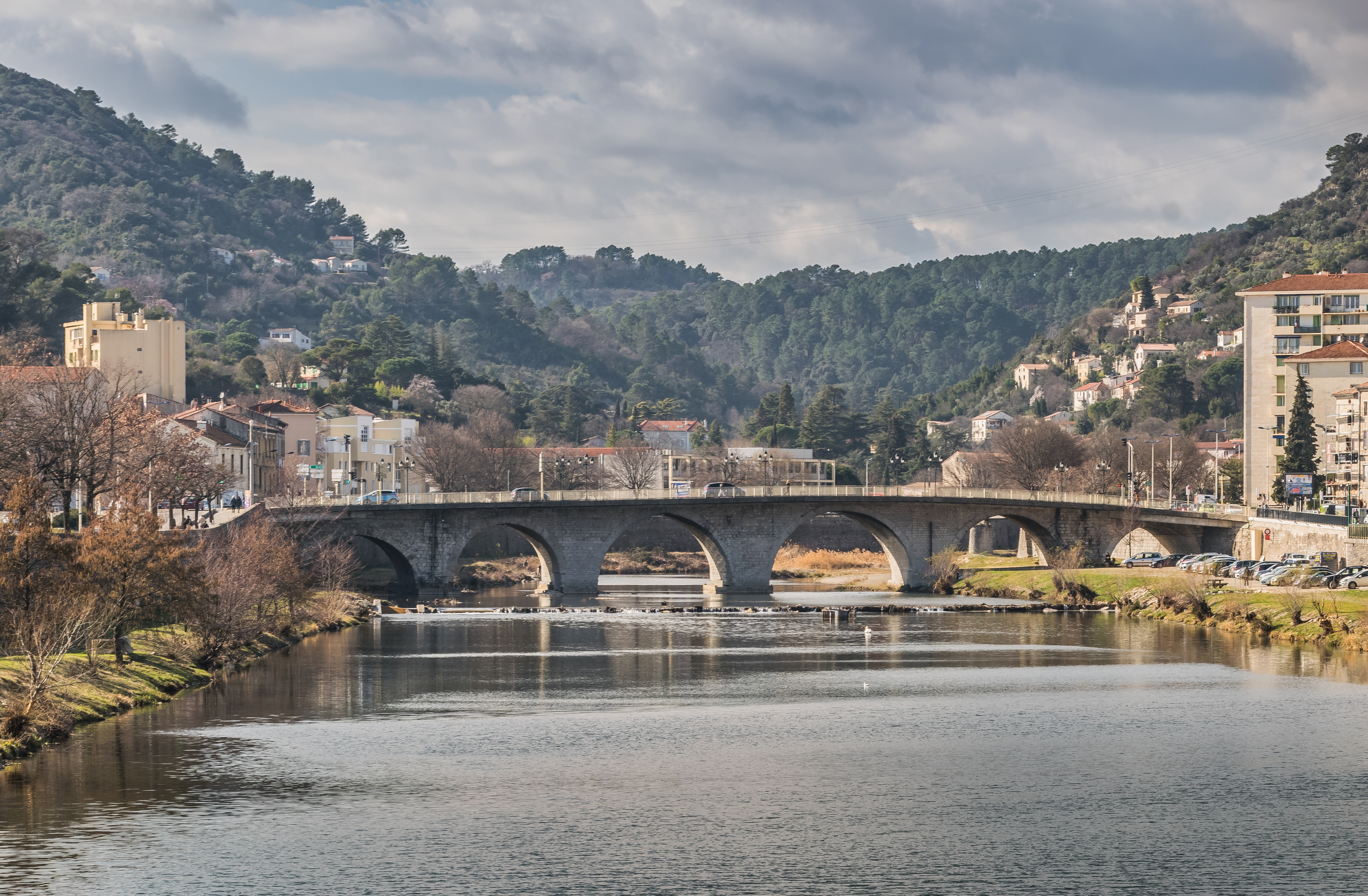
- Alès

- Location within France Location within Occitanie

Location
- Country: France

Physical characteristics
- Source
  - location: Cévennes
- Mouth: Gardon
  - location: Ners
  - coordinates: 44°01′58″N 4°07′57″E
- Length: 61 km (38 mi)

Basin features
- Progression: Gardon→ Rhône→ Mediterranean Sea

The Gardon d'Alès is a tributary of the Gardon in the Lozère and Gard departments, France. It is 61 km (38 mi) long. Its source is in the Cévennes near Saint-Privat-de-Vallongue. It flows through the town Alès and joins the Gardon near Ners.
