= The Ruins of Nîmes, Orange and Saint-Rémy-de-Provence =

French painting by Hubert Robert

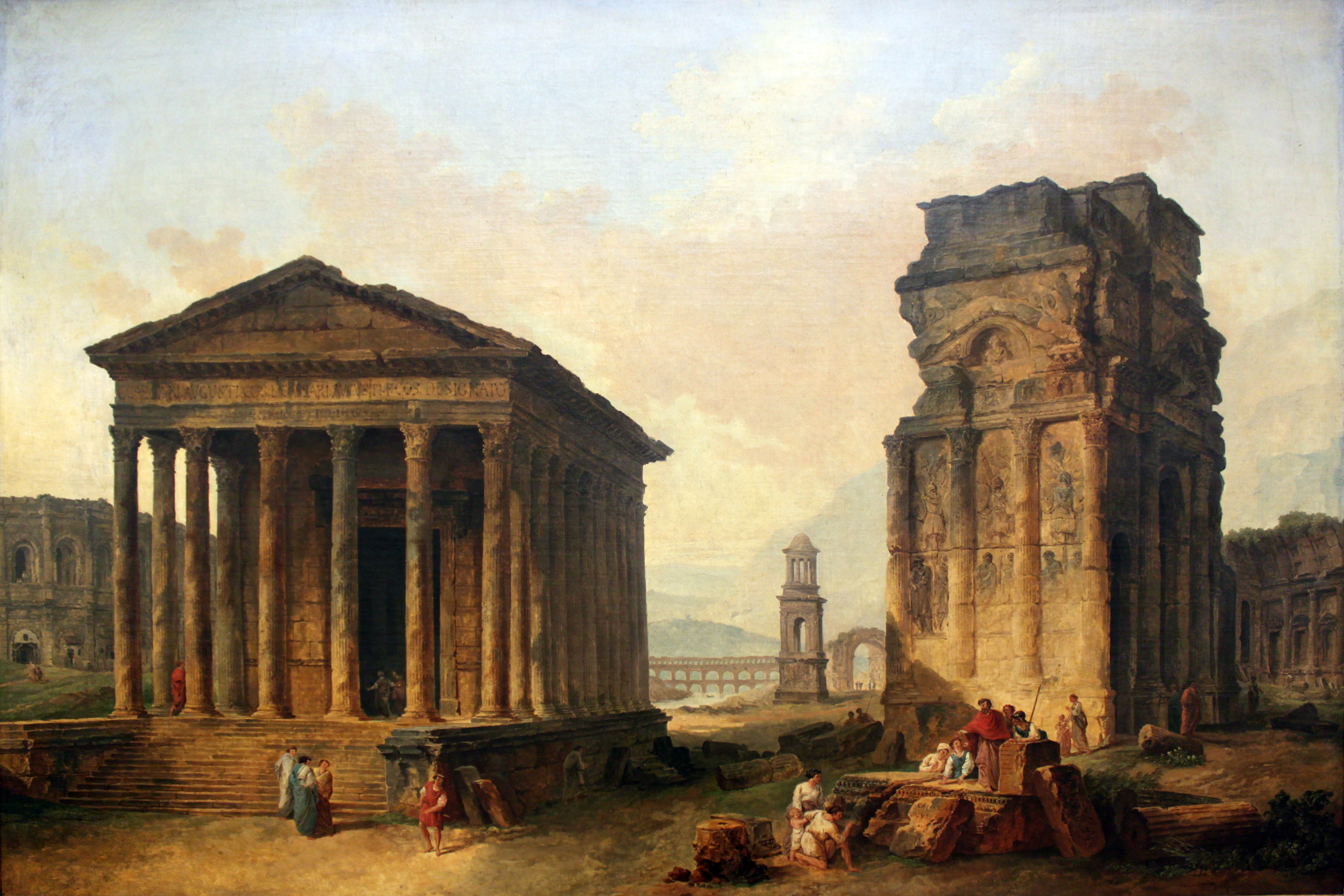
The Ruins of Nîmes, Orange and Saint-Rémy-de-Provence (1789) by Hubert Robert

The Ruins of Nîmes, Orange and Saint-Rémy-de-Provence is a 1789 oil-on-canvas painting by the French artist Hubert Robert, now in the Gemäldegalerie, Berlin. It combines the ruins shown in his Principal Monuments of France series, with the Maison Carrée to the left, the Triumphal Arch of Orange and Nîmes' Temple of Diana to the right and the Pont du Gard, the Triumphal Arch of Glanum and the Glanum Mausoleum in the far background.

In accordance with many of his paintings, if the architectural reality is measured in the details of the ruins,"Robert of the Ruins" cheerfully mixes the places to make an imaginary space of fantasy.
