= Portrait of Hubert Robert =

Painting by Élisabeth Vigée Le Brun

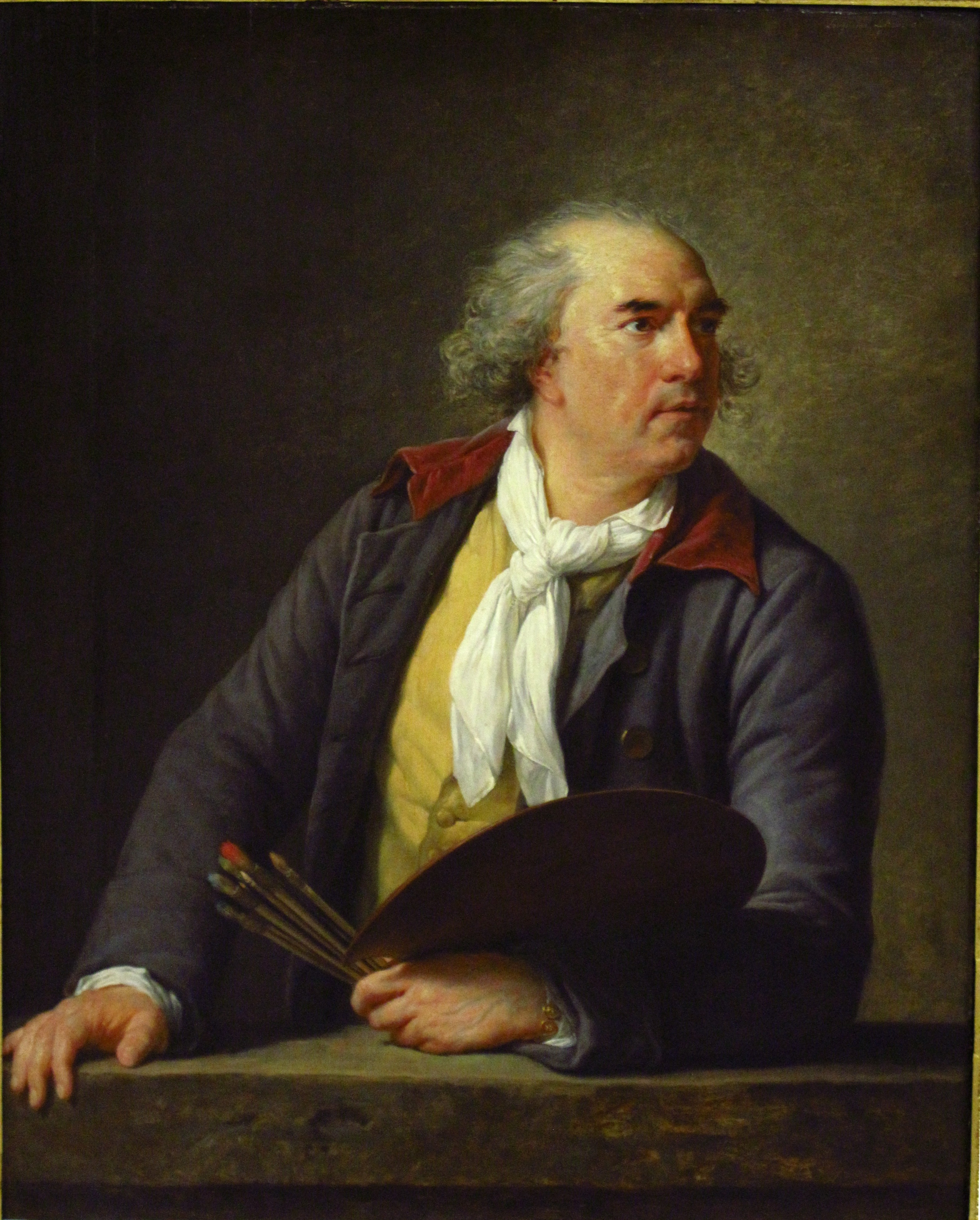
- Artist: Élisabeth Vigée Le Brun
- Year: 1788
- Type: Oil on canvas, portrait painting
- Dimensions: 105 cm × 84 cm (41 in × 33 in)
- Location: Louvre, Paris

Portrait of Hubert Robert is a 1788 portrait painting by the French artist Élisabeth Vigée Le Brun. It depicts her fellow painter Hubert Robert. Robert was known for his scenes of French cities and had recently produced his Principal Monuments of France series. Robert is portrayed informally and the painting has been described as "a masterpiece of portraiture".

The work was produced a year before the French Revolution. At the time Le Brun was one of the most fashionable portraitists in France, known particularly for her depictions of the French queen Marie Antoinette. The painting was displayed at the Salon of 1789. Today the work is in the collection of the Louvre in Paris, having been acquired in 1843.

== Bibliography ==
- Baillio, Joseph & Baetjer, Katharine & Lang, Paul. Vigée Le Brun. Metropolitan Museum of Art, 2016.
- Helm, W.H. Elisabeth Louise Vigée-Lebrun. Parkstone International, 2018.
- May, Gita. '"Elisabeth Vigee Le Brun: The Odyssey of an Artist in an Age of Revolution'". Yale University Press, 2008.
- Sheriff, Mary D. The Exceptional Woman: Elisabeth Vigee-Lebrun and the Cultural Politics of Art. University of Chicago Press, 1997.
