= Pont de Bornègre =

Former Roman aqueduct

Coordinates: 43°59′1.5″N 4°28′33″E

Course of the ancient aqueduct from Uzès to Nîmes. The Pont de Bornègre is located at its upper reaches, 9 km above the Pont du Gard.

The Pont de Bornègre (or Pont de Bordnègre) is an ancient bridge of the Roman aqueduct to Nîmes, which also includes the famous Pont du Gard, between the communes of Saint-Maximin, and Argilliers. It is located at the upper reaches of the approximately 50 km long aqueduct, 6,745 m downstream of the Eure source and 9,061 m upstream of the Pont du Gard. The structure bridges an intermittent torrent, the Bordnègre, with a catchment area of 0.6–0.8 km^{2} and, according to modern estimates, a maximum flood flow of 5 m^{3}/s water.

Its three segmental arches, with a total span of 17 m, are built of voussoirs covering the whole breadth of the bridge. Today, two of them are buried by sediments up to the springing line of the vaults. After the aqueduct fell into disrepair during the Middle Ages, the Bornègre Bridge, like its big sister across the Gard, was used as a conventional bridge for foot traffic.

== See also ==
- List of Roman bridges

== Sources ==
- Hubert Chanson: "Hydraulics of Large Culvert beneath Roman Aqueduct of Nîmes", Journal of Irrigation and Drainage Engineering, Vol. 128, No. 5 (Sept./Oct. 2002), pp. 326–330 (329)
