= Ners =

- Commune
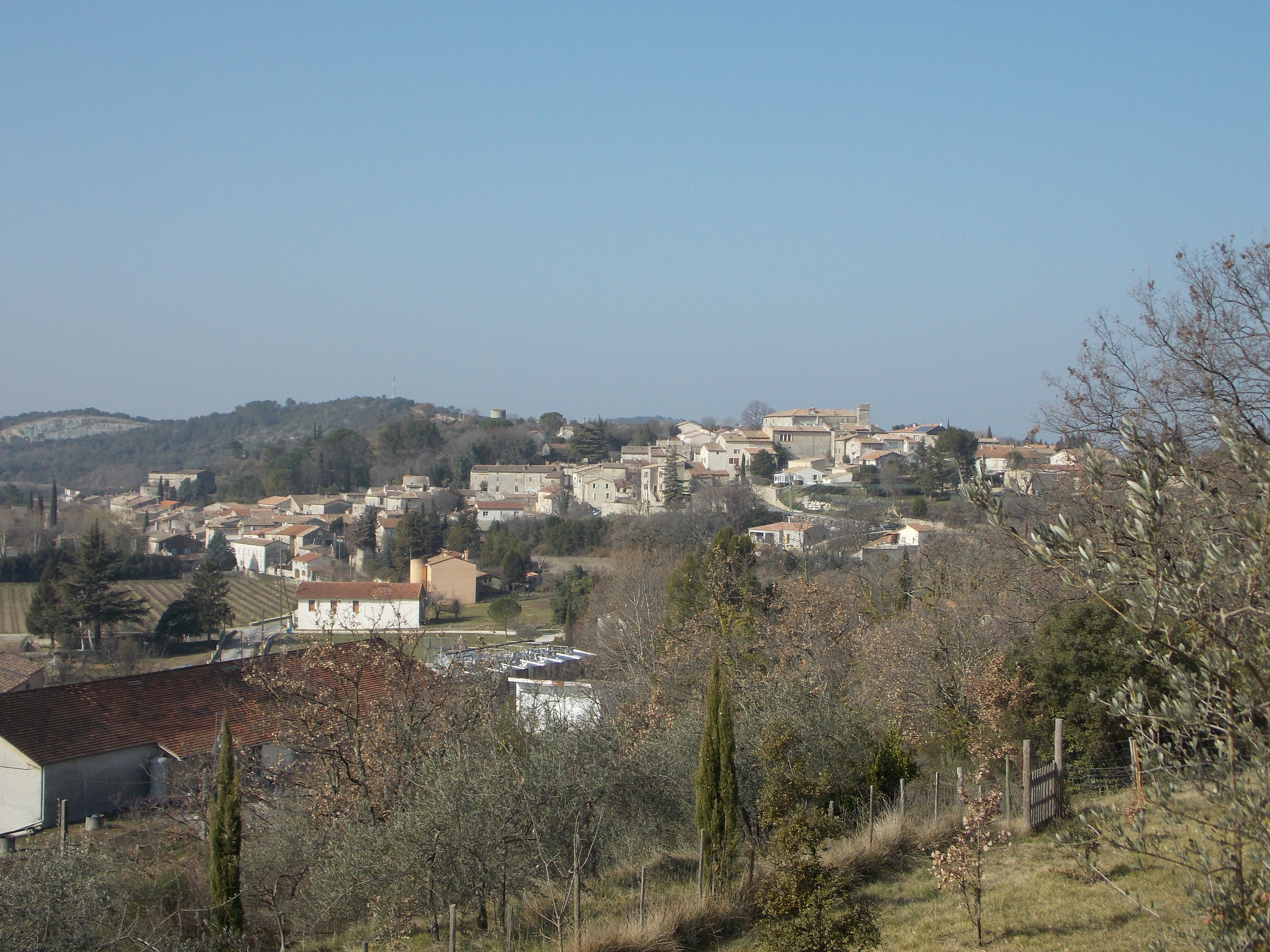
- A general view of Ners

- Coat of arms
- Location of Ners
- Location within France Location within Occitanie
- Coordinates: 44°01′38″N 4°09′34″E
- Country: France
- Region: Occitania
- Department: Gard
- Arrondissement: Alès
- Canton: Quissac
- Intercommunality: Alès Agglomération

Government
  - Mayor (2020–2026): Patrice Pupet
- Area^{1}: 4.96 km^{2} (1.92 sq mi)
- Elevation: 123 m (404 ft)
- Highest elevation: 181 m (594 ft)
- Lowest elevation: 79 m (259 ft)
- Population (2023): 830
  - Density: 170/km^{2} (430/sq mi)
- Time zone: UTC+01:00 (CET)
  - Summer (DST): UTC+02:00 (CEST)
- INSEE/Postal code: 30188 /30360
- ^{1} French Land Register data, which excludes lakes, ponds, glaciers > 1 km^{2} (0.386 sq mi or 247 acres) and river estuaries.

Ners is a commune in the Gard department in southern France.

== History ==
Ners is part of a territory inhabited long before the Roman presence in the region.

The village is located along the ancient road 'voie Régordane' going from Saint-Gilles to Puy-en-Velay. Along this road traders, pilgrims, crusaders and knights crossed the river Gardon.

In 1211 Ners is first time reported as a place of residence with the "castrum nercium" - a watchtower of the twelfth century. This tower was probably constructed as an outpost to the village of Vezenobres as well as to protect the few inhabitants of the village. The tower was gradually expanded and in 1480 it retained its castle walls and is to be considered the oldest building in the village.

== Etymology ==
Etymologically the name can be derived from "Nertius", a Gallo-Roman person with great prestige in ancient times. A manuscript from 1247 mentions the name "Nercium" and in 1547 "Ners".

== Population ==
Historical population
Year	Pop.	±% p.a.
1968	357	—
1975	362	+0.20%
1982	473	+3.89%
1990	544	+1.76%
1999	618	+1.43%
2007	672	+1.05%
2012	719	+1.36%
2017	702	−0.48%
2023	830	+2.83%
Source: INSEE

== See also ==
- The village of Ners
- Communes of the Gard department
