= Gorges du Gardon =

Coordinates: 43.9370°N 4.4057°E

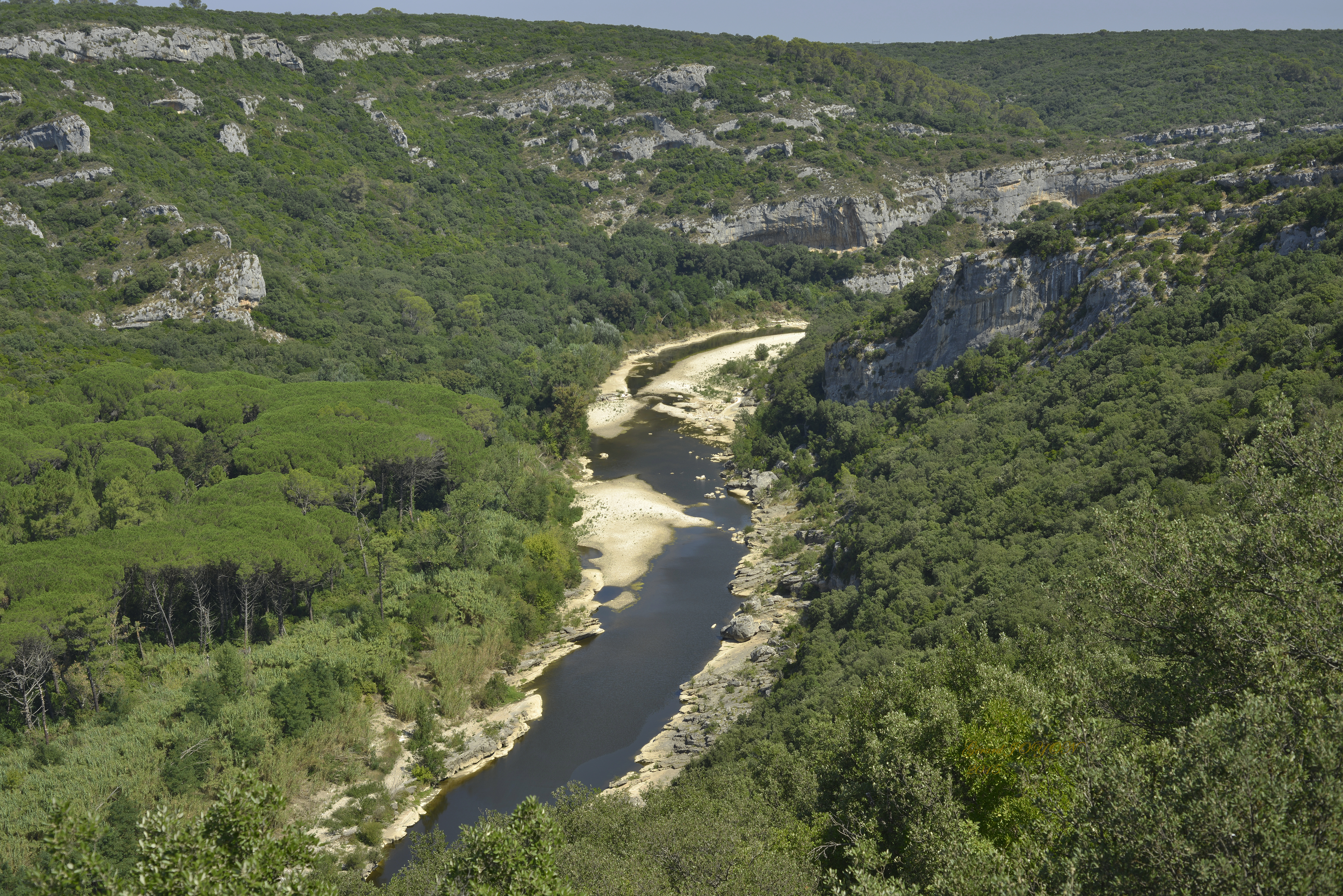
Gorges du Gardon

The Gorges du Gardon form a canyon carved out by the river Gardon, a tributary of the Rhône with its source in the Cévennes. They are located in the heart of the Gard department in the Occitanie region.

The local nature reserve of the Gorges du Gardon (RNR157) was classified as a nature reserve in 2007 and occupies an area of 491 hectares.

On 9 June 2015, the Gorges du Gardon were designated a Biosphere Reserve by UNESCO, provided by the Joint Association coordonnée of the gorges du Gardon.
