= Principal Monuments of France =

1786 series of paintings by Hubert Robert

Principal Monuments of France (French: Principaux Monuments de la France) is a series of four paintings created by the French artist Hubert Robert in 1786. They depict the ruins of several Roman structures in Provence.

== Series ==
The paintings were made using oil on canvas. The subjects are ancient Roman ruins in Provence in southern France. The structures depicted are the interior of the Temple of Diana in Nîmes, the Triumphal Arch and Roman Theatre in Orange (combined in an imaginary perspective), the Maison Carrée, amphitheater and Tour Magne in Nîmes (also from an imaginary perspective), and the Pont du Gard over the Gardon river.

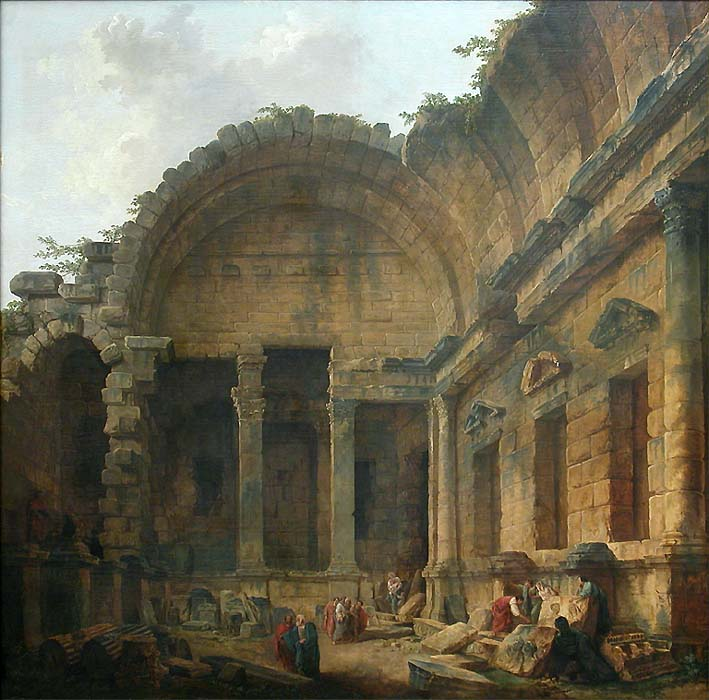
Interior of the Temple of Diana in Nîmes (Intérieur du Temple de Diane à Nîmes), 242 × 242 cm

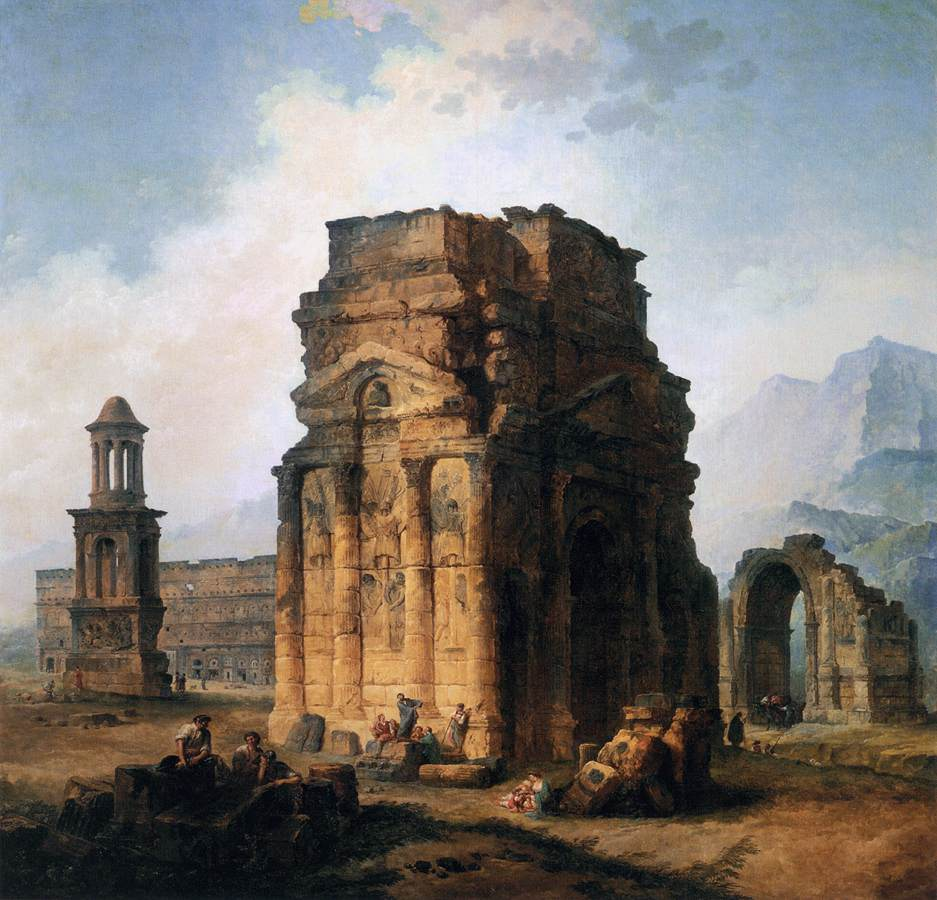
The Arc de Triomphe and the Theater in Orange (L'Arc de triomphe et le Théâtre d'Orange), 242 × 242 cm

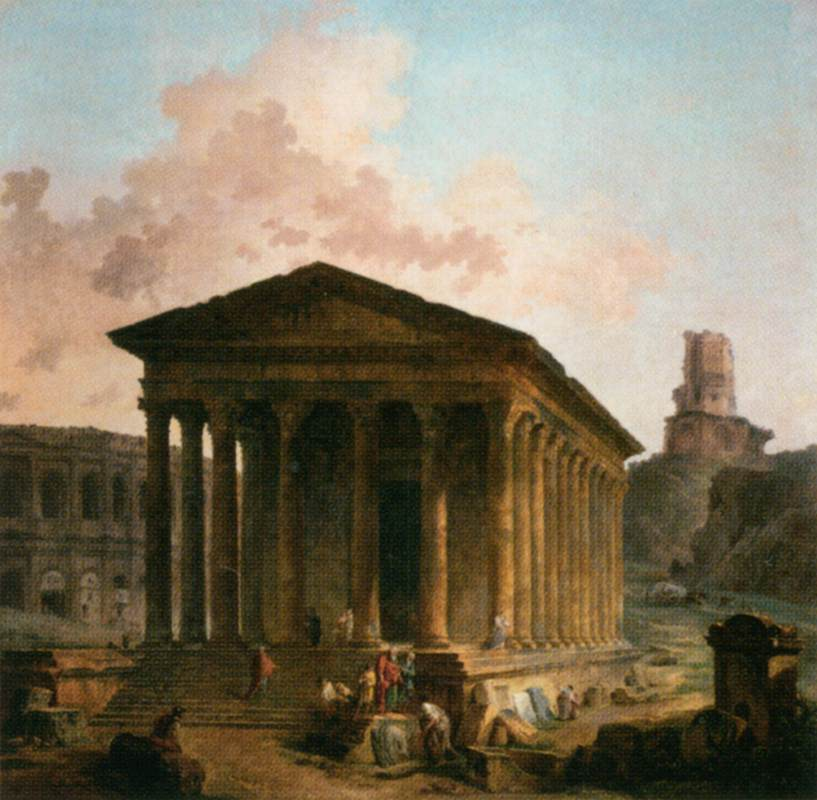
The Maison Carrée, the Amphitheater, and the Tour Magne in Nîmes (La Maison Carrée, les Arènes et la Tour Magne à Nîmes), 243 × 244 cm

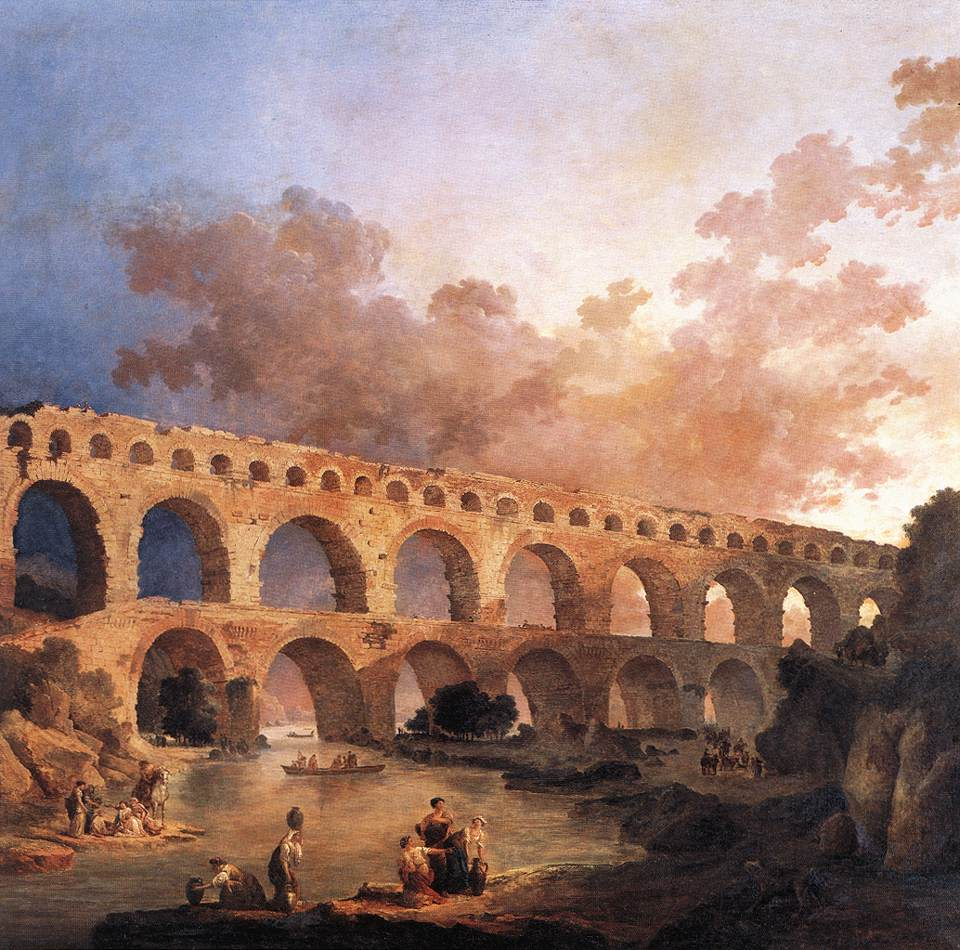
The Pont du Gard (Le Pont du Gard), 242 × 242 cm

== Background ==
Hubert Robert (1733–1808) belonged to a trend of 18th-century veduta painters specialized on ancient ruins, established in France through Giovanni Paolo Panini and Claude Joseph Vernet. This trend was greatly supported by the development of archeology, which increased the interest in ancient buildings. Robert had traveled in Italy in 1754–1765 and painted many Roman ruins on location. After returning to France he continued to paint ancient ruins as well as idealized versions of French landscapes.

== History ==
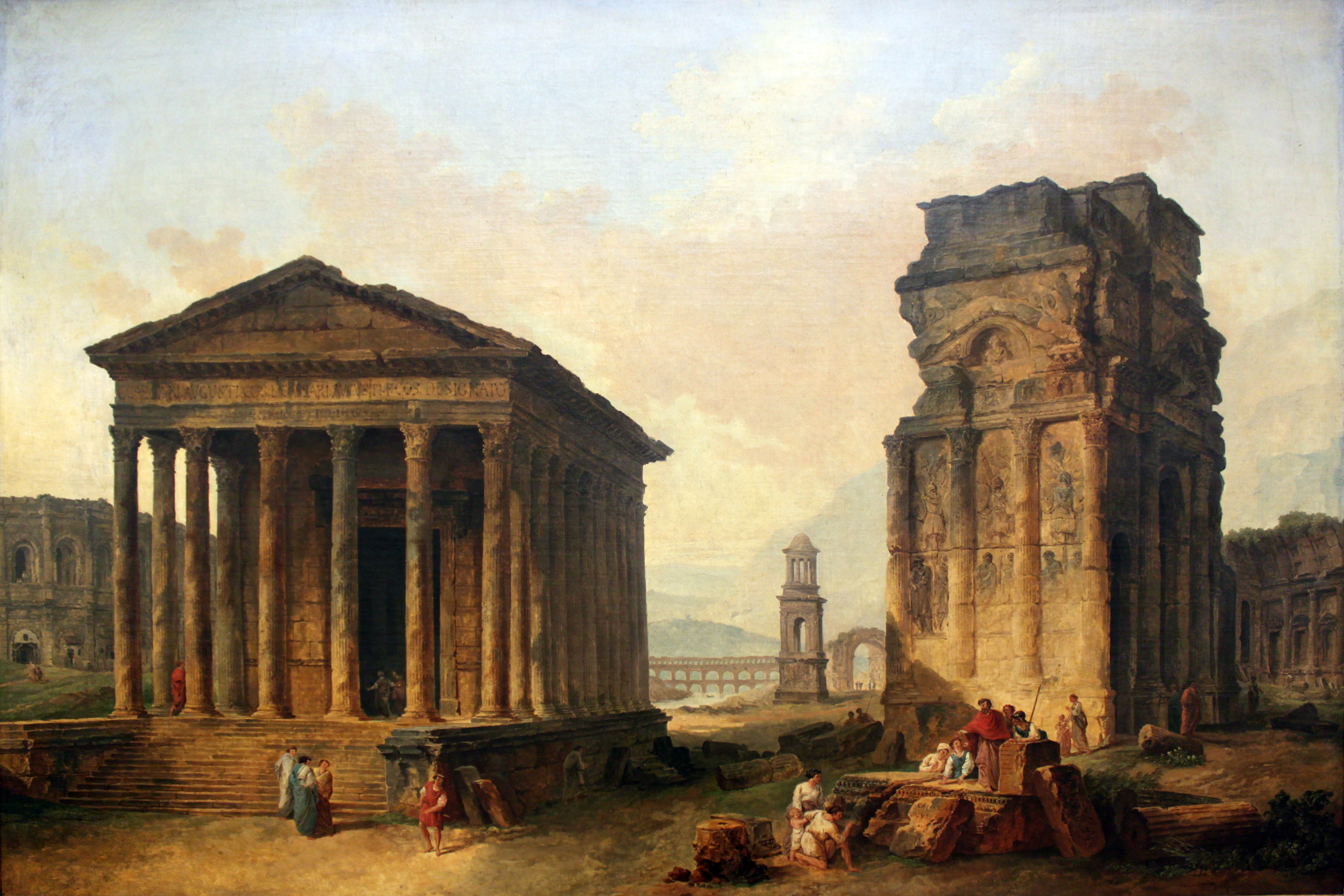
The Ruins of Nîmes, Orange and Saint-Rémy-de-Provence, 1789.

The Principal Monuments of France was made in 1786 to decorate a room at the Palace of Fontainebleau, although the paintings were never installed at this location. In 1787 they were reproduced as engravings. The four paintings were also exhibited at the Salon of 1787. They were bought by the Bâtiments du Roi, but for unknown reasons two of them, The Arc and The Maison Carrée, were returned to the painter. On 13 July 1821 they were bequeathed by Robert's widow to the Louvre. All four paintings are now found in the Department of Paintings in the Louvre.

In 1789, Robert painted The Ruins of Nîmes, Orange and Saint-Rémy-de-Provence, which depicts all ruins seen in the Principal Monuments series.

== See also ==
- Roman Gaul
