= Gardon =

River in southern France

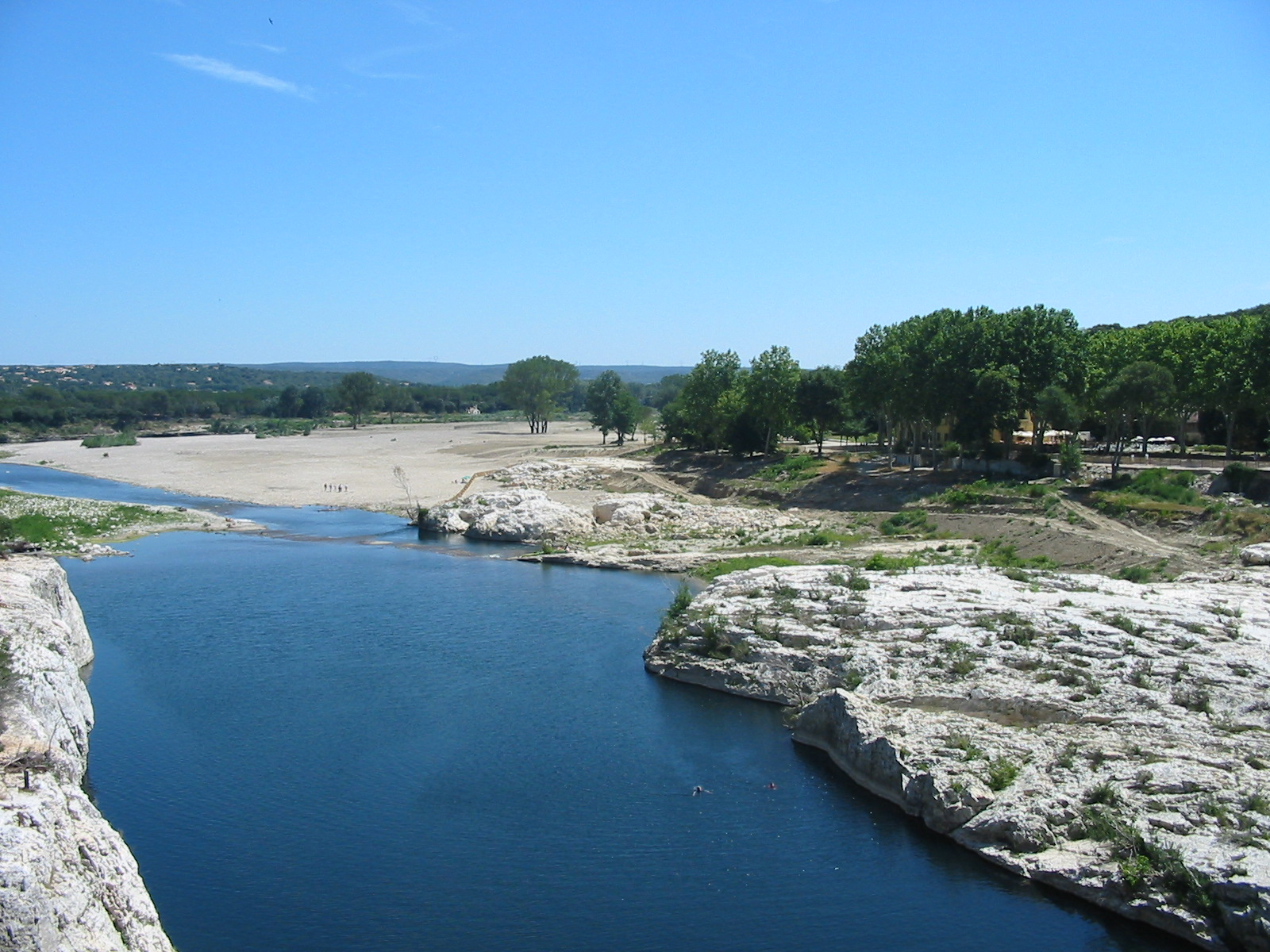
- The Gardon near the Pont du Gard

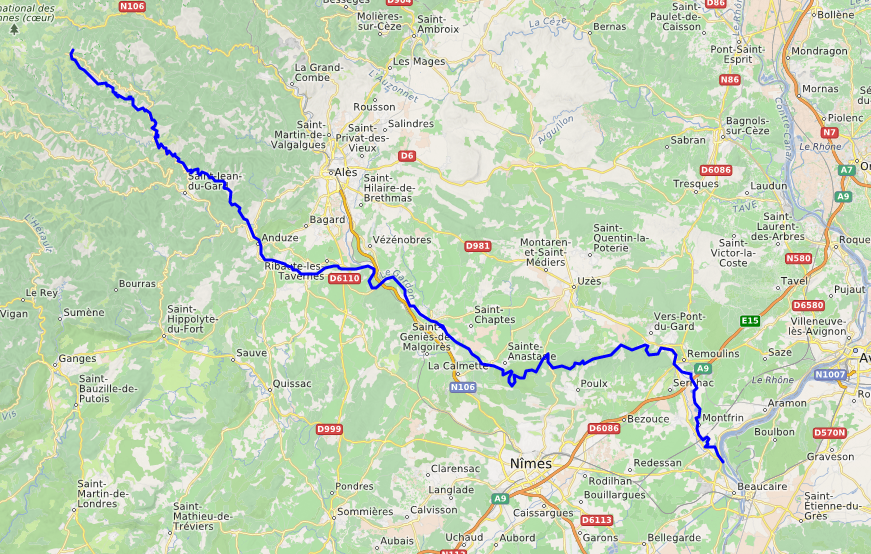

Location
- Country: France

Physical characteristics
- Source
  - location: Cévennes
- Mouth: Rhône
  - coordinates: 43°51′6″N 4°36′54″E
- Length: 133 km (83 mi)
- Basin size: 2,200 km^{2} (850 mi^{2})
- Discharge
  - average: 32 m^{3}/s (1,100 cu ft/s)

Basin features
- Progression: Rhône→ Mediterranean Sea
- Tributaries
  - left: Gardon d'Alès

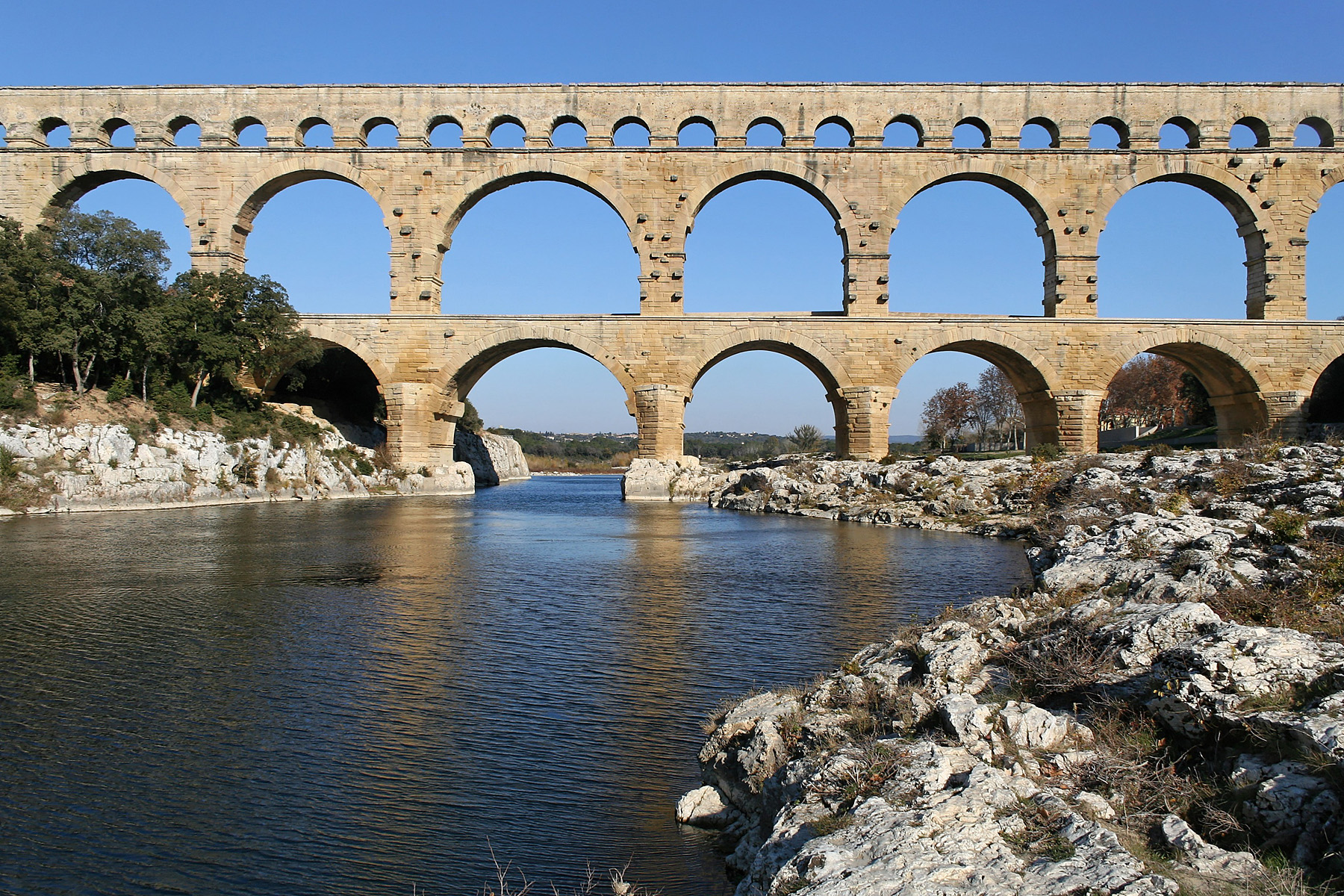
Pont du Gard

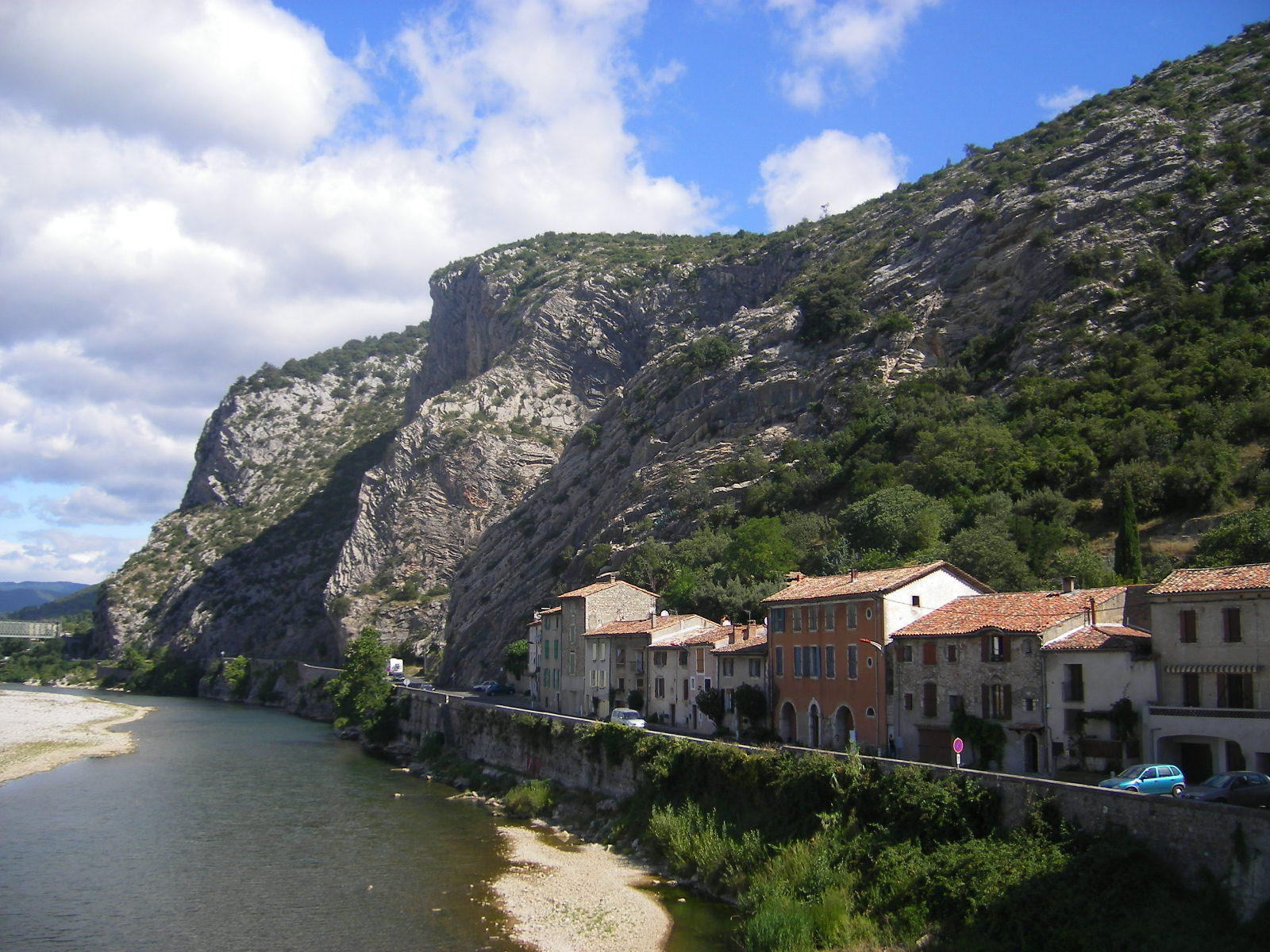
The Gardon in Anduze

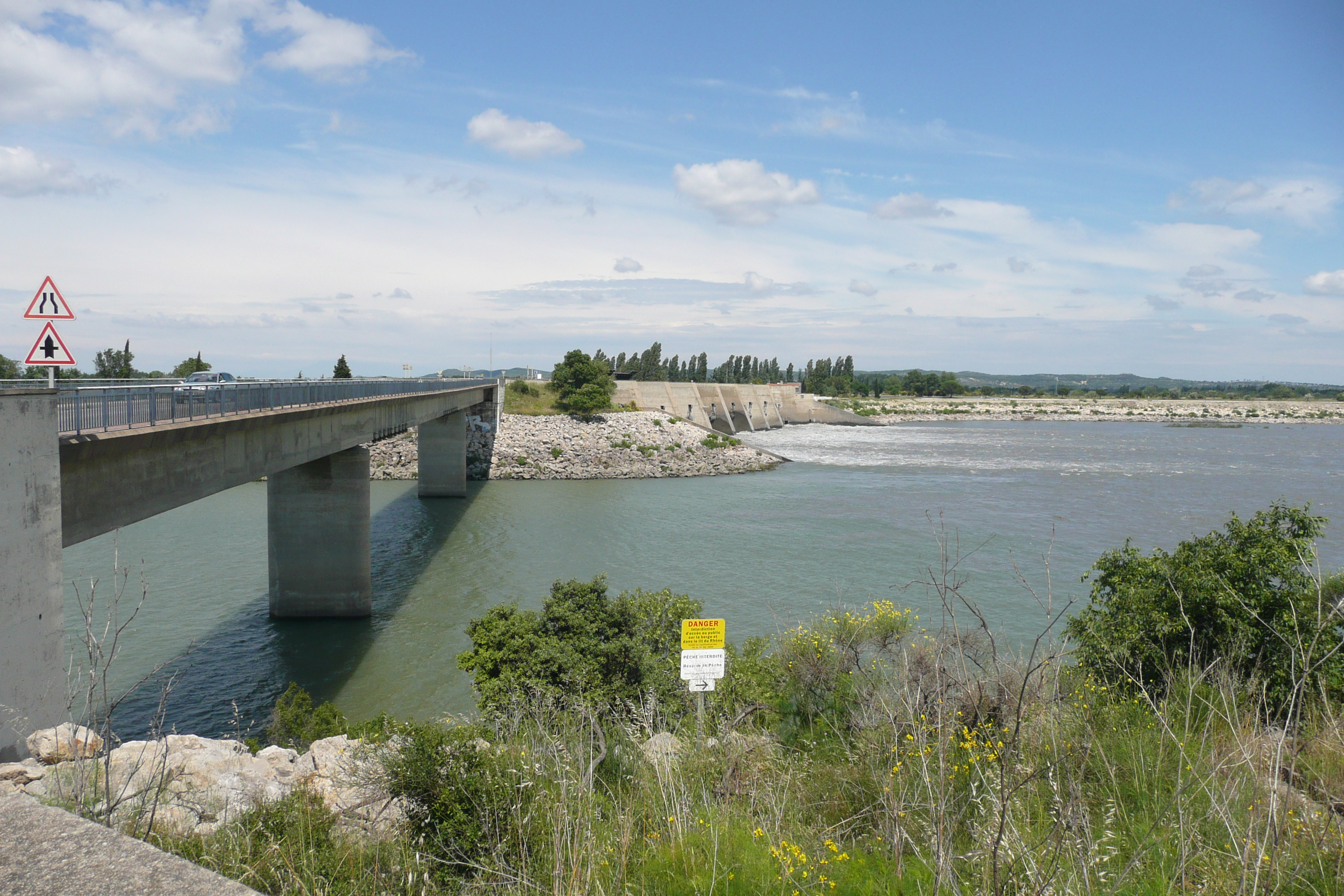
Confluence of the Gardon and the Rhône at Comps

The Gardon or Gard (Occitan and French: Gardon, Gard, French pronunciation: [ɡaʁdɔ̃], [ɡaʁ]) is a river in southern France. It is the namesake of the department of Gard. Several of its tributaries are also called Gardon. It is 127.6 km (79.3 mi) long, and takes its source in the commune of Saint-Martin-de-Lansuscle, in the Cévennes mountain range. In its upper course it is also referred to as Gardon de Saint-Martin. From its furthest source, that of its tributary "Gardon de Saint-Jean", it is 133 km long. It flows into the Rhône (right-side tributary) at Comps, north of Beaucaire, across from Vallabrègues.

== Features ==
The Roman aqueduct Pont du Gard and the 16th-century Pont Saint-Nicolas are two historic bridges that cross the Gardon. The Gorges du Gardon, which ends at Pont Saint-Nicolas, is a popular recreation area for kayaking, canoeing, rock climbing, and hiking.

The village of Collias, approximately 12 kilometres (7 mi) downriver from the Pont Saint-Nicolas, has several kayak and canoe rental agencies which will bus customers upriver to the Pont Saint-Nicolas (until the river level drops low in late June). Departing from Collias by kayak or canoe will bring you to the Pont du Gard in about an hour and one-half. It is possible to kayak or canoe under the Pont du Gard, although at times the river is not high enough to allow for passage.

== Floods ==
In September 2002 and again in December 2003, the Gardon had record level floods that damaged many of its bridges including the Pont Saint-Nicolas, which has since been fully restored. The river today shows few signs of the floods.

== Places along the river ==
- Lozère
- Gard : Anduze, Saint-Jean-du-Gard, Saint-André-de-Valborgne, Remoulins, Montfrin

La Grand-Combe and Alès are situated on the Gardon d'Alès, the major left tributary.
