= Peyrolles =

Peyrolles is the name or part of the name of the following communes in France:

- Peyrolles, Aude, in the Aude department
- Peyrolles, Gard (formerly Peyroles), in the Gard department
- Peyrolles-en-Provence, in the Bouches-du-Rhône department

== See also ==
- Peyrole, in the Tarn department
