= Saint-Bresson =

Saint-Bresson may refer to:

- Saint-Bresson, Gard, in the Gard department of France
- Saint-Bresson, Haute-Saône, in the Haute-Saône department of France
