= Félix de Tarteron =

French politician

Félix de Tarteron (March 28, 1821, Sumène - November 15, 1888) was a French Legitimist politician. He was a member of the National Assembly from 1871 to 1876.
