= Pommiers =

Pommiers is the name or part of the name of several communes in France:

- Pommiers, Aisne, in the Aisne département
- Pommiers, Gard, in the Gard département
- Pommiers, Indre, in the Indre département
- Pommiers, Rhône, in the Rhône département
- Pommiers-en-Forez, in the Loire département
- Pommiers-la-Placette, in the Isère département
- Pommiers-Moulons, in the Charente-Maritime département
- Pommier, in the Pas-de-Calais département
- Pommier-de-Beaurepaire, in the Isère département
