= Arrondissement of Le Vigan =

Coordinates: 43°59′29″N 3°36′20″E

Le Vigan
- Arrondissement
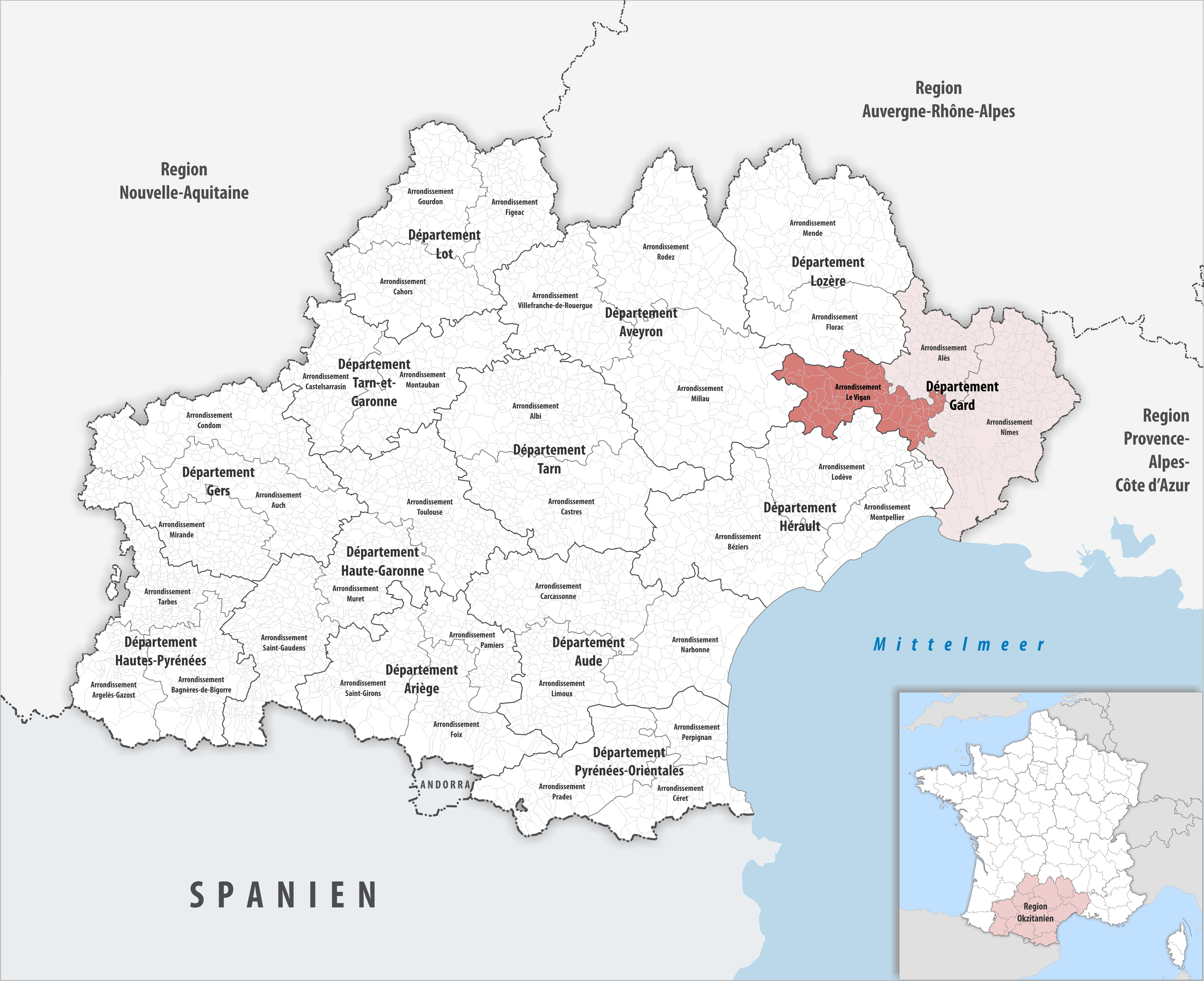
- Location within the region Occitanie
- Country: France
- Region: Occitania
- Department: Gard
- No. of communes: {{{nbcomm}}}
- Area: 1,390.6 km^{2} (536.9 sq mi)
- Population (2023): 40,020
  - Density: 28.78/km^{2} (74.54/sq mi)
- INSEE code: 303

The arrondissement of Le Vigan is an arrondissement of France in the Gard department in the Occitanie region. It has 74 communes. Its population is 39,330 (2021), and its area is 1,390.6 km^{2} (536.9 sq mi).

== Composition ==
The communes of the arrondissement of Le Vigan, and their INSEE codes, are:

1. Aigremont (30002)
2. Alzon (30009)
3. Arphy (30015)
4. Arre (30016)
5. Arrigas (30017)
6. Aulas (30024)
7. Aumessas (30025)
8. Avèze (30026)
9. Bez-et-Esparon (30038)
10. Blandas (30040)
11. Bragassargues (30050)
12. Bréau-Mars (30052)
13. Brouzet-lès-Quissac (30054)
14. La Cadière-et-Cambo (30058)
15. Campestre-et-Luc (30064)
16. Canaules-et-Argentières (30065)
17. Cardet (30068)
18. Carnas (30069)
19. Cassagnoles (30071)
20. Causse-Bégon (30074)
21. Colognac (30087)
22. Conqueyrac (30093)
23. Corconne (30095)
24. Cros (30099)
25. Dourbies (30105)
26. Durfort-et-Saint-Martin-de-Sossenac (30106)
27. L'Estréchure (30108)
28. Fressac (30119)
29. Gailhan (30121)
30. Lanuéjols (30139)
31. Lasalle (30140)
32. Lédignan (30146)
33. Liouc (30148)
34. Logrian-Florian (30150)
35. Mandagout (30154)
36. Maruéjols-lès-Gardon (30160)
37. Molières-Cavaillac (30170)
38. Monoblet (30172)
39. Montdardier (30176)
40. Orthoux-Sérignac-Quilhan (30192)
41. Peyrolles (30195)
42. Les Plantiers (30198)
43. Pommiers (30199)
44. Pompignan (30200)
45. Puechredon (30208)
46. Quissac (30210)
47. Revens (30213)
48. Rogues (30219)
49. Roquedur (30220)
50. Saint-André-de-Majencoules (30229)
51. Saint-André-de-Valborgne (30231)
52. Saint-Bénézet (30234)
53. Saint-Bresson (30238)
54. Saint-Félix-de-Pallières (30252)
55. Saint-Hippolyte-du-Fort (30263)
56. Saint-Jean-de-Crieulon (30265)
57. Saint-Julien-de-la-Nef (30272)
58. Saint-Laurent-le-Minier (30280)
59. Saint-Martial (30283)
60. Saint-Nazaire-des-Gardies (30289)
61. Saint-Roman-de-Codières (30296)
62. Saint-Sauveur-Camprieu (30297)
63. Saint-Théodorit (30300)
64. Sardan (30309)
65. Saumane (30310)
66. Sauve (30311)
67. Savignargues (30314)
68. Soudorgues (30322)
69. Sumène (30325)
70. Trèves (30332)
71. Val-d'Aigoual (30339)
72. Vic-le-Fesq (30349)
73. Le Vigan (30350)
74. Vissec (30353)

== History ==
The arrondissement of Le Vigan was created in 1800. At the January 2017 reorganisation of the arrondissements of Gard, it gained six communes from the arrondissement of Alès, and it lost four communes to the arrondissement of Alès and one commune to the arrondissement of Nîmes.

As a result of the reorganisation of the cantons of France which came into effect in 2015, the borders of the cantons are no longer related to the borders of the arrondissements. The cantons of the arrondissement of Le Vigan were, as of January 2015:

1. Alzon
2. Lasalle
3. Quissac
4. Saint-André-de-Valborgne
5. Saint-Hippolyte-du-Fort
6. Sauve
7. Sumène
8. Trèves
9. Valleraugue
10. Le Vigan
