= Saint-Roman-de-Codières =

- Commune
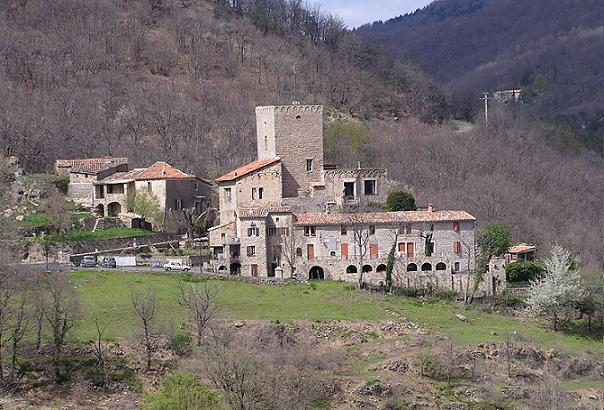
- A general view of Saint-Roman-de-Codières

- Coat of arms
- Location of Saint-Roman-de-Codières
- Location within France Location within Occitanie
- Coordinates: 44°00′11″N 3°46′41″E
- Country: France
- Region: Occitania
- Department: Gard
- Arrondissement: Le Vigan
- Canton: Le Vigan
- Intercommunality: Cévennes Gangeoises et Suménoises

Government
  - Mayor (2020–2026): Luc Villaret
- Area^{1}: 18.43 km^{2} (7.12 sq mi)
- Elevation: 630 m (2,070 ft)
- Highest elevation: 981 m (3,219 ft)
- Lowest elevation: 280 m (920 ft)
- Population (2023): 166
  - Density: 9.01/km^{2} (23.3/sq mi)
- Time zone: UTC+01:00 (CET)
  - Summer (DST): UTC+02:00 (CEST)
- INSEE/Postal code: 30296 /30440
- ^{1} French Land Register data, which excludes lakes, ponds, glaciers > 1 km^{2} (0.386 sq mi or 247 acres) and river estuaries.

Saint-Roman-de-Codières (French pronunciation: [sɛ̃ ʁɔmɑ̃ də kɔdjɛʁ]; Occitan: Sent Roman de Codièira) is a commune in the Gard department in southern France.

== Population ==
Historical population
Year	Pop.	±% p.a.
1968	132	—
1975	138	+0.64%
1982	147	+0.91%
1990	134	−1.15%
1999	180	+3.33%
2007	173	−0.49%
2012	196	+2.53%
2017	157	−4.34%
2023	166	+0.93%
Source: INSEE

== See also ==
- Communes of the Gard department
