= La Cadière-et-Cambo =

Commune in Occitanie, France

- Commune
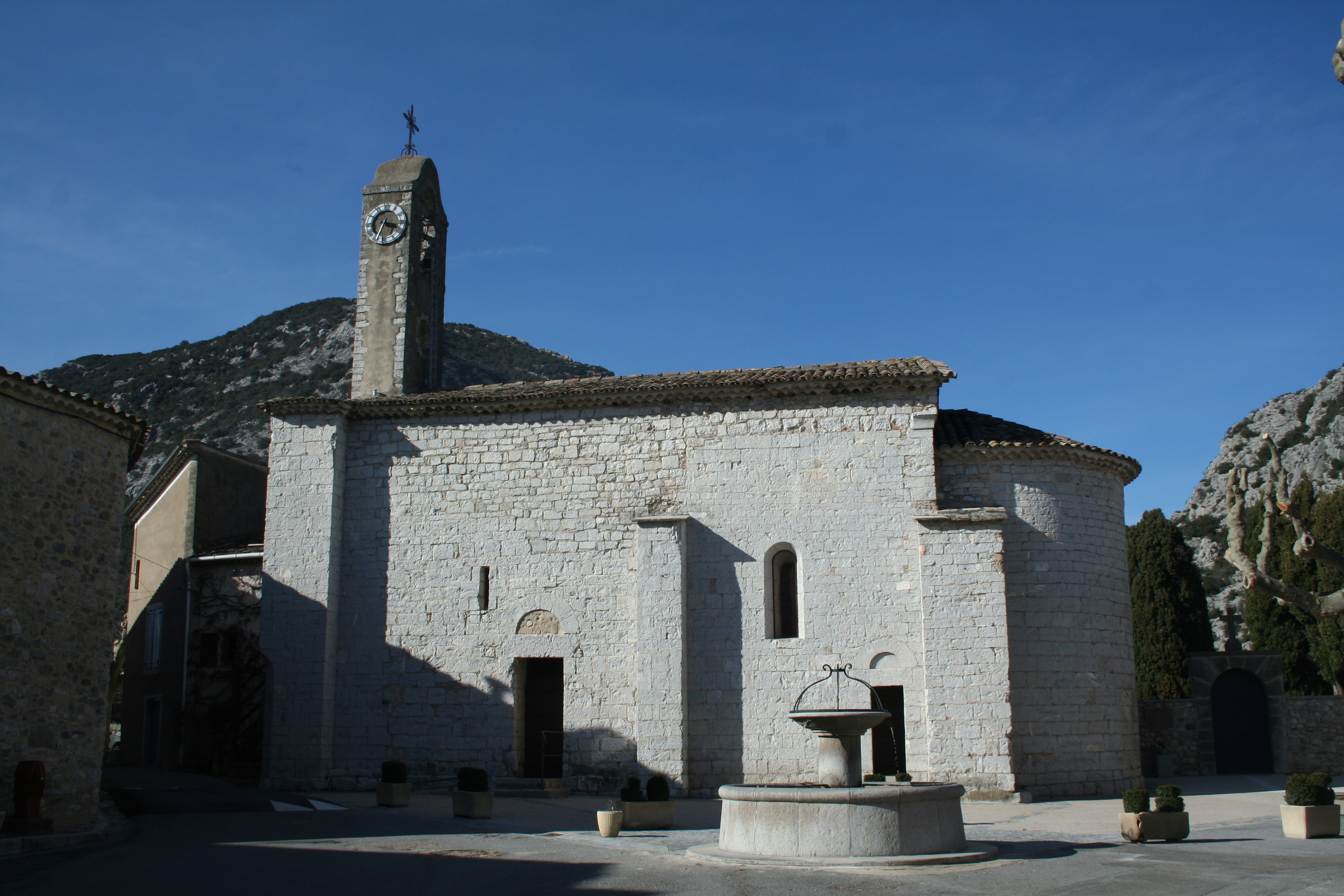
- The church in La Cadière-et-Cambo

- Coat of arms
- Location of La Cadière-et-Cambo
- Location within France Location within Occitanie
- Coordinates: 43°57′30″N 3°48′32″E
- Country: France
- Region: Occitania
- Department: Gard
- Arrondissement: Le Vigan
- Canton: Le Vigan
- Intercommunality: Piémont Cévenol

Government
  - Mayor (2020–2026): Jean-Louis Lagarde
- Area^{1}: 11.97 km^{2} (4.62 sq mi)
- Elevation: 240 m (790 ft)
- Highest elevation: 862 m (2,828 ft)
- Lowest elevation: 190 m (620 ft)
- Population (2023): 230
  - Density: 19/km^{2} (50/sq mi)
- Time zone: UTC+01:00 (CET)
  - Summer (DST): UTC+02:00 (CEST)
- INSEE/Postal code: 30058 /30170
- ^{1} French Land Register data, which excludes lakes, ponds, glaciers > 1 km^{2} (0.386 sq mi or 247 acres) and river estuaries.

La Cadière-et-Cambo (French pronunciation: [la kadjɛʁ e kɑ̃bo]; Occitan: La Cadièira e Cambon) is a commune in the Gard department in southern France.

== Population ==
Historical population
| Year | Pop. | ±% p.a. |
|---|---|---|
| 1968 | 140 | — |
| 1975 | 127 | −1.38% |
| 1982 | 151 | +2.50% |
| 1990 | 163 | +0.96% |
| 1999 | 183 | +1.29% |
| 2007 | 200 | +1.12% |
| 2012 | 206 | +0.59% |
| 2017 | 210 | +0.39% |
| 2023 | 230 | +1.53% |
Source: INSEE

== See also ==
- Communes of the Gard department
