= Gabriel François Venel =

French chemist and physician

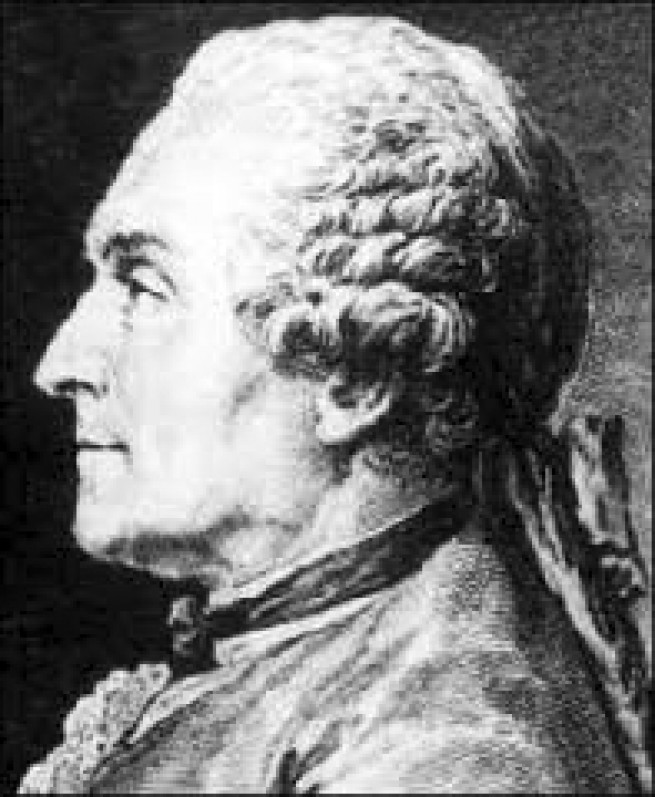

Gabriel François Venel (23 August 1723, Tourbes – 29 October 1775, Pézenas) was a French chemist, physician and a contributor to the Encyclopédie, (673 items; articles on chemistry, pharmacy, physiology and medicine).

== Biography and Works ==
He is the son of Étienne Venel, physician and Anne Hiché, and was born in Tourbes in 1723. In 1742 he obtained his doctorate in medicine from the University of Montpellier. He also attended the public courses in chemistry given by Rouelle in Paris, which confirmed his main interest in chemistry. Venel later on talked very highly of his professor, including in his famous article Chymie written for the Encyclopédie.

As inspecteur général des eaux minérales, with Pierre Bayen (1725–1798), he was tasked in 1753 to provide analysis of French mineral waters. In 1768 he became a member of the Société royale des sciences de Montpellier. In 1759 he obtained the chair of materia medica at the University of Montpellier. In parallel, he also gave a course in chemistry outside of the University, in which he taught about the vegetal, mineral and animal chemistry. The practical demonstrations were performed by Jacques Montet.

While often interpreted as an early chemist and Enlightenment thinker, Venel may have been influenced by Alchemy and Iatrochemistry. In his entry on chemistry in the Encyclopédie, he explicitly calls for a "New Paracelsus" to further develop the field.

His work on mineral waters was interrupted in 1756 due to the cost of the Seven Years' War, but funds were gathered again in 1773, and Venel thus resumed his work and travels to analyse waters. His manuscript remained however unfinished. He died due to illness in 1775.

== Selected works ==
- Mémoire sur l'analyse des eaux de selters ou de seltz, 1755.
- Essai sur l'analyse des végétaux, 1755.
- Analyses chimiques des nouvelles eaux nimérales, vitrioliques, ferrugineuses, decouvertes à Passy dans la maison de Madame de Calsabigi, 1757.
- "Quaestiones chemicae duodecim ab illustrissimis viris ... propositae ... : pro Regiâ Cathedrâ vacante in Universitate Medicinae Monspeliensi", 1759.
- Instructions sur l'usage de la houille, 1775.
- Précis de matiere médicale, 1787.
- Books about Gabriel François Venel:
- Gabriel-François Venel (1723-1775): sa place dans la chimie française du XVIIIe siècle, by Christine Lecornu Lehman, Université de Paris X: Nanterre, 2000 (1404 pages).
