= Molières-Cavaillac =

- Commune
- Coat of arms
- Location of Molières-Cavaillac
- Location within France Location within Occitanie
- Coordinates: 43°58′35″N 3°34′37″E
- Country: France
- Region: Occitania
- Department: Gard
- Arrondissement: Le Vigan
- Canton: Le Vigan
- Intercommunality: Pays Viganais

Government
  - Mayor (2025–2026): Laurence Beranger
- Area^{1}: 7.71 km^{2} (2.98 sq mi)
- Elevation: 350 m (1,150 ft)
- Highest elevation: 753 m (2,470 ft)
- Lowest elevation: 235 m (771 ft)
- Population (2023): 905
  - Density: 117/km^{2} (304/sq mi)
- Time zone: UTC+01:00 (CET)
  - Summer (DST): UTC+02:00 (CEST)
- INSEE/Postal code: 30170 /30120
- ^{1} French Land Register data, which excludes lakes, ponds, glaciers > 1 km^{2} (0.386 sq mi or 247 acres) and river estuaries.

Molières-Cavaillac (French pronunciation: [mɔljɛʁ kavajak]; Occitan: Molièras e Cavalhac) is a commune in the Gard department in southern France.

== Population ==
Historical population
Year	Pop.	±% p.a.
1968	358	—
1975	504	+5.01%
1982	617	+2.93%
1990	705	+1.68%
1999	800	+1.41%
2007	937	+2.00%
2012	919	−0.39%
2017	938	+0.41%
2023	905	−0.60%
Source: INSEE

== See also ==
- Communes of the Gard department
