= Arphy =

Commune in Occitanie, France

- Commune
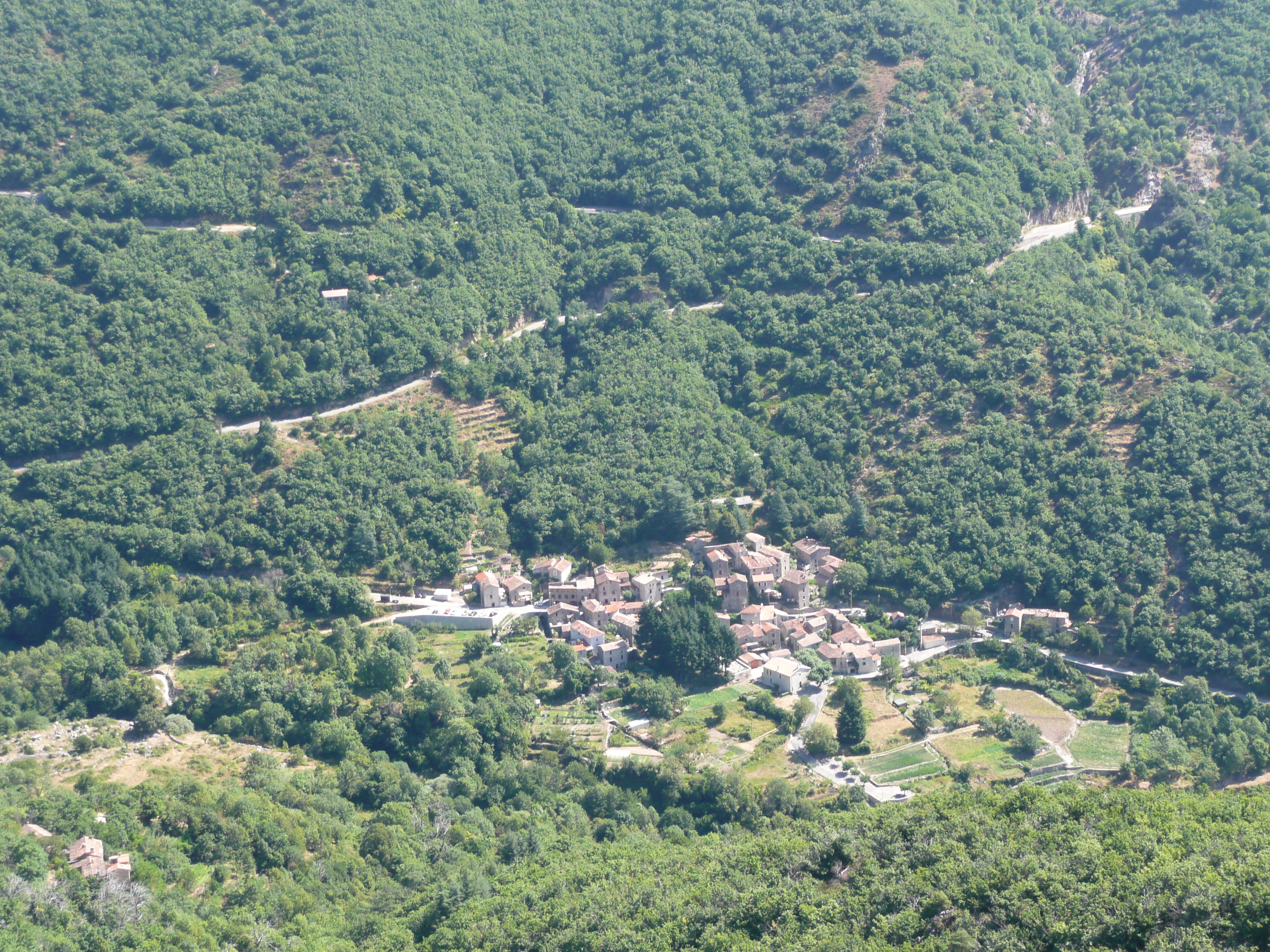
- A general view of Arphy

- Coat of arms
- Location of Arphy
- Location within France Location within Occitanie
- Coordinates: 44°01′11″N 3°35′52″E
- Country: France
- Region: Occitania
- Department: Gard
- Arrondissement: Le Vigan
- Canton: Le Vigan
- Intercommunality: CC Pays Viganais

Government
  - Mayor (2020–2026): Jean-Pierre Gabel
- Area^{1}: 20.92 km^{2} (8.08 sq mi)
- Elevation: 500 m (1,600 ft)
- Highest elevation: 1,405 m (4,610 ft)
- Lowest elevation: 340 m (1,120 ft)
- Population (2023): 139
  - Density: 6.64/km^{2} (17.2/sq mi)
- Time zone: UTC+01:00 (CET)
  - Summer (DST): UTC+02:00 (CEST)
- INSEE/Postal code: 30015 /30120
- ^{1} French Land Register data, which excludes lakes, ponds, glaciers > 1 km^{2} (0.386 sq mi or 247 acres) and river estuaries.

Arphy (French pronunciation: [aʁfi]; Occitan: Arfi) is a commune in the Gard department in southern France.

== Geography ==
=== Climate ===
Arphy has an oceanic climate (Köppen climate classification Cfb) closely bordering on a warm-summer Mediterranean climate (Csb). The average annual temperature in Arphy is 12.7 °C (54.9 °F). The average annual rainfall is 1,561.2 mm (61.46 in) with October as the wettest month. The temperatures are highest on average in July, at around 20.9 °C (69.6 °F), and lowest in January, at around 5.6 °C (42.1 °F). The highest temperature ever recorded in Arphy was 40.7 °C (105.3 °F) on 28 June 2019; the coldest temperature ever recorded was −12.3 °C (9.9 °F) on 12 February 2012.

Climate data for Arphy (1981−2010 normals, extremes 1989−2020)
Month	Jan	Feb	Mar	Apr	May	Jun	Jul	Aug	Sep	Oct	Nov	Dec	Year
Record high °C (°F)	22.0 (71.6)	24.1 (75.4)	27.5 (81.5)	31.5 (88.7)	33.0 (91.4)	40.7 (105.3)	37.0 (98.6)	38.2 (100.8)	36.5 (97.7)	32.0 (89.6)	25.0 (77.0)	21.0 (69.8)	40.7 (105.3)
Mean daily maximum °C (°F)	10.3 (50.5)	11.3 (52.3)	14.6 (58.3)	16.7 (62.1)	21.3 (70.3)	25.5 (77.9)	28.3 (82.9)	28.1 (82.6)	23.2 (73.8)	18.2 (64.8)	13.3 (55.9)	10.3 (50.5)	18.5 (65.3)
Daily mean °C (°F)	5.6 (42.1)	6.3 (43.3)	9.0 (48.2)	11.0 (51.8)	15.0 (59.0)	18.5 (65.3)	20.9 (69.6)	20.9 (69.6)	16.7 (62.1)	13.1 (55.6)	8.7 (47.7)	5.9 (42.6)	12.7 (54.9)
Mean daily minimum °C (°F)	0.9 (33.6)	1.2 (34.2)	3.3 (37.9)	5.4 (41.7)	8.7 (47.7)	11.6 (52.9)	13.7 (56.7)	13.7 (56.7)	10.2 (50.4)	8.1 (46.6)	4.2 (39.6)	1.5 (34.7)	6.9 (44.4)
Record low °C (°F)	−9.0 (15.8)	−12.3 (9.9)	−11.0 (12.2)	−2.0 (28.4)	0.0 (32.0)	3.0 (37.4)	6.0 (42.8)	5.0 (41.0)	2.0 (35.6)	−5.0 (23.0)	−8.0 (17.6)	−9.5 (14.9)	−12.3 (9.9)
Average precipitation mm (inches)	151.3 (5.96)	104.7 (4.12)	85.4 (3.36)	135.9 (5.35)	113.5 (4.47)	72.2 (2.84)	36.5 (1.44)	56.6 (2.23)	166.5 (6.56)	244.0 (9.61)	209.5 (8.25)	185.1 (7.29)	1,561.2 (61.46)
Average precipitation days (≥ 1.0 mm)	9.7	7.9	6.8	9.2	8.7	5.9	4.1	6.0	6.9	11.8	10.6	10.5	98.1
Source: Météo-France

== Population ==
Historical population
Year	Pop.	±% p.a.
1968	130	—
1975	86	−5.73%
1982	122	+5.12%
1990	131	+0.89%
1999	173	+3.14%
2007	157	−1.21%
2012	178	+2.54%
2017	171	−0.80%
2023	139	−3.39%
Source: INSEE

== See also ==
- Communes of the Gard department
