= Aumessas =

Commune in Occitanie, France

- Commune
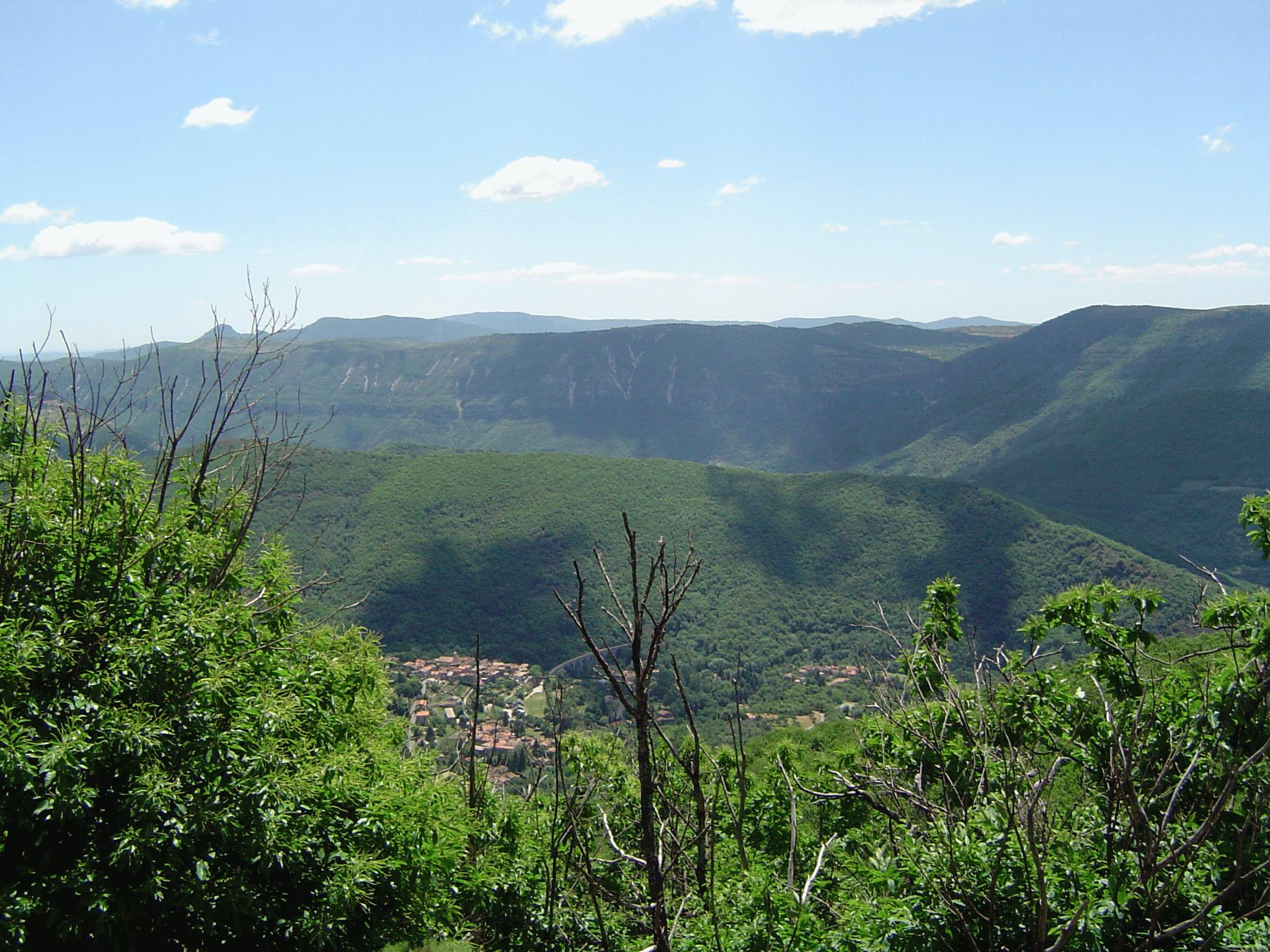
- A general view of Aumessas

- Coat of arms
- Location of Aumessas
- Location within France Location within Occitanie
- Coordinates: 43°59′31″N 3°30′16″E
- Country: France
- Region: Occitania
- Department: Gard
- Arrondissement: Le Vigan
- Canton: Le Vigan
- Intercommunality: CC Pays Viganais

Government
  - Mayor (2020–2026): Philippe Barral
- Area^{1}: 21.45 km^{2} (8.28 sq mi)
- Elevation: 455 m (1,493 ft)
- Highest elevation: 1,449 m (4,754 ft)
- Lowest elevation: 332 m (1,089 ft)
- Population (2023): 263
  - Density: 12.3/km^{2} (31.8/sq mi)
- Time zone: UTC+01:00 (CET)
  - Summer (DST): UTC+02:00 (CEST)
- INSEE/Postal code: 30025 /30770
- ^{1} French Land Register data, which excludes lakes, ponds, glaciers > 1 km^{2} (0.386 sq mi or 247 acres) and river estuaries.

Aumessas is a commune in the Gard department in southern France.

== Population ==
Historical population
Year	Pop.	±% p.a.
1968	204	—
1975	211	+0.48%
1982	213	+0.13%
1990	200	−0.78%
1999	225	+1.32%
2007	228	+0.17%
2012	232	+0.35%
2017	228	−0.35%
2023	263	+2.41%
Source: INSEE

== See also ==
- Communes of the Gard department
