= Saint-André-de-Valborgne =

Commune in Occitanie, France

- Commune
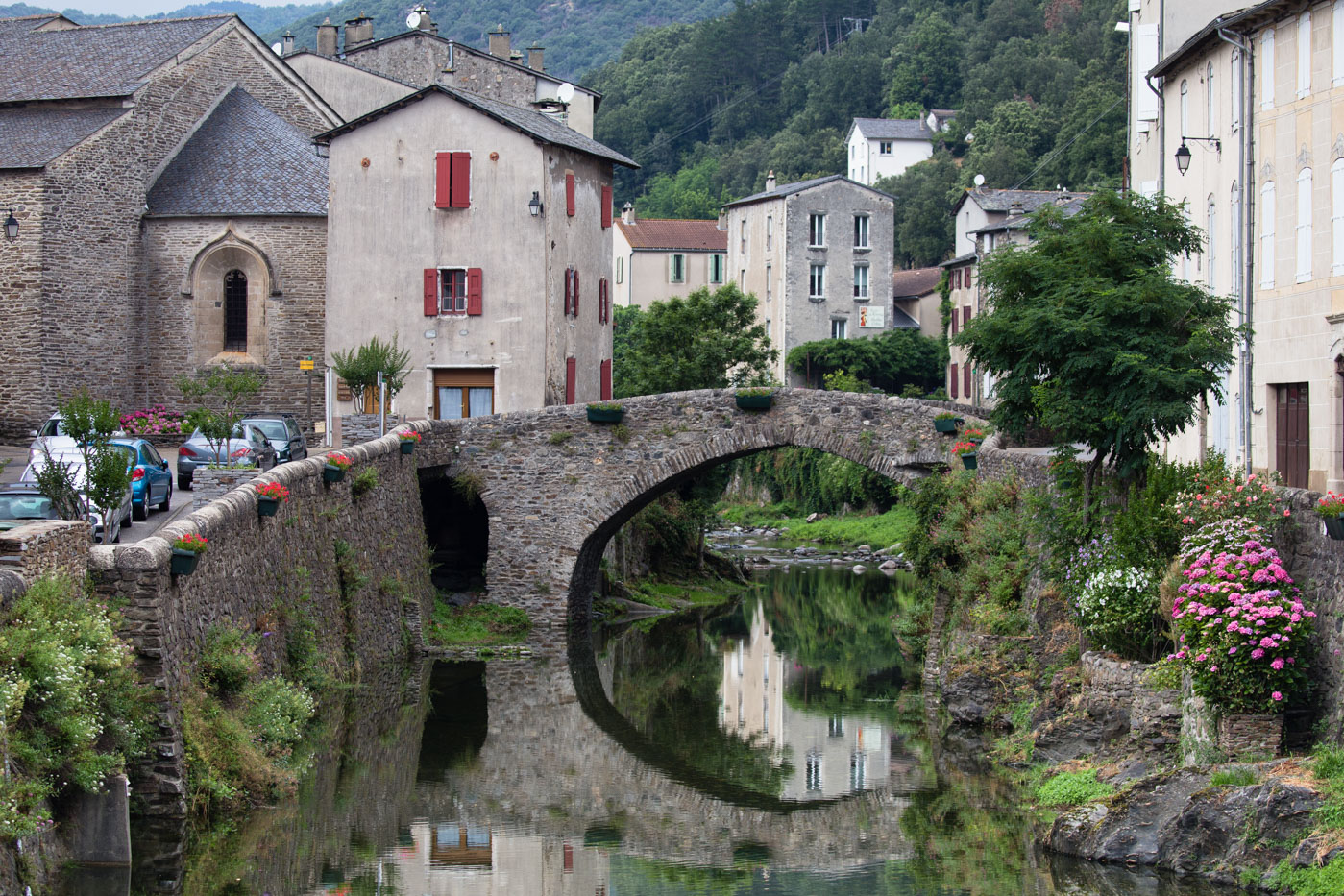

- Coat of arms
- Location of Saint-André-de-Valborgne
- Location within France Location within Occitanie
- Coordinates: 44°09′25″N 3°41′01″E
- Country: France
- Region: Occitania
- Department: Gard
- Arrondissement: Le Vigan
- Canton: Le Vigan

Government
  - Mayor (2020–2026): Régis Bourelly
- Area^{1}: 48.71 km^{2} (18.81 sq mi)
- Elevation: 435 m (1,427 ft)
- Highest elevation: 1,200 m (3,900 ft)
- Lowest elevation: 339 m (1,112 ft)
- Population (2023): 366
  - Density: 7.51/km^{2} (19.5/sq mi)
- Time zone: UTC+01:00 (CET)
  - Summer (DST): UTC+02:00 (CEST)
- INSEE/Postal code: 30231 /30940
- ^{1} French Land Register data, which excludes lakes, ponds, glaciers > 1 km^{2} (0.386 sq mi or 247 acres) and river estuaries.

Saint-André-de-Valborgne (French pronunciation: [sɛ̃.t‿ɑ̃dʁe də valbɔʁɲ]; Occitan: Sant Andrieu de Valbornha) is a commune in the Gard department in southern France.

== Population ==
Historical population
Year	Pop.	±% p.a.
1968	524	—
1975	429	−2.82%
1982	443	+0.46%
1990	437	−0.17%
1999	368	−1.89%
2007	446	+2.43%
2012	432	−0.64%
2017	382	−2.43%
2023	366	−0.71%
Source: INSEE

== See also ==
- Communes of the Gard department
