= Saint-Julien-de-la-Nef =

- Commune
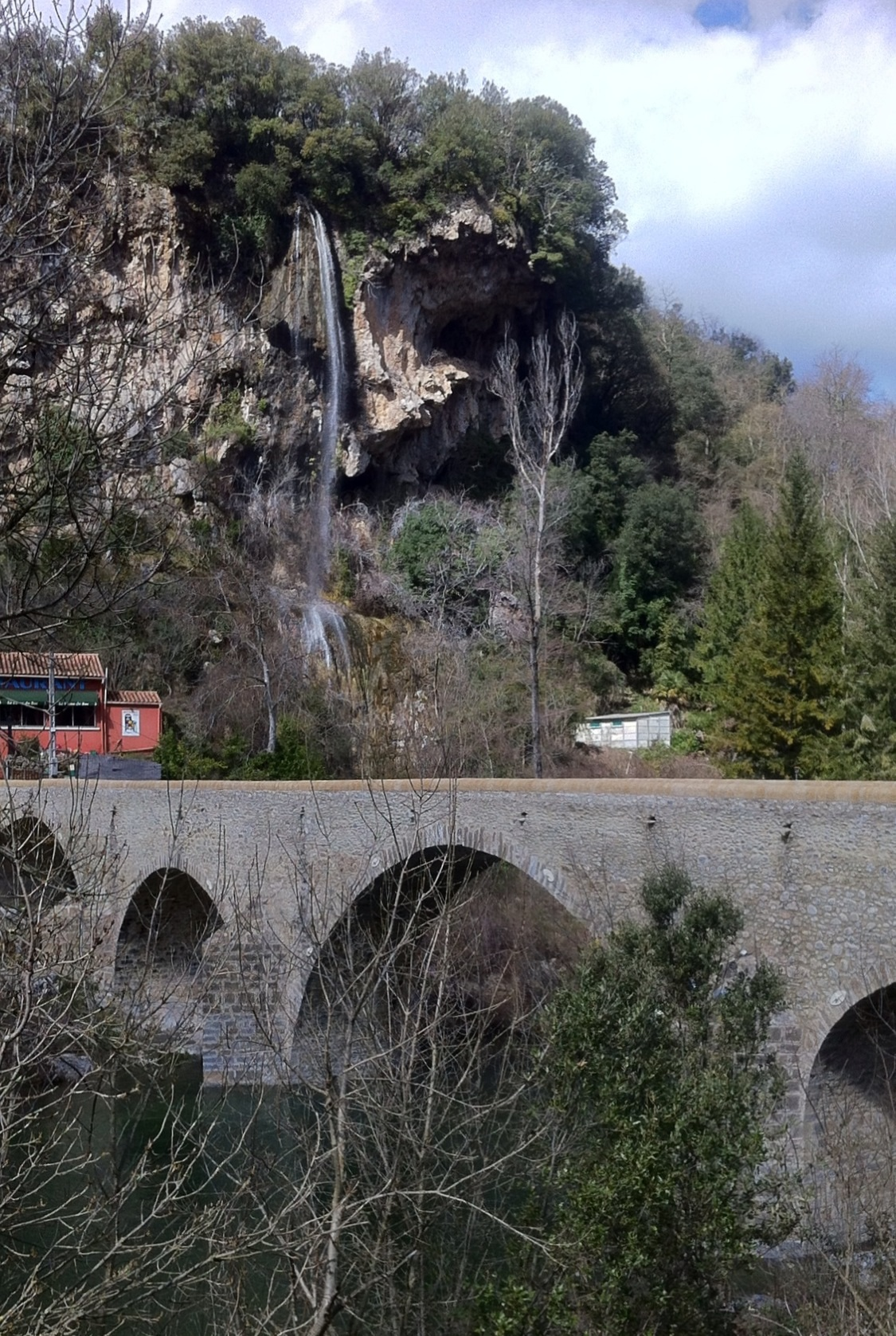
- The Aigues Folles waterfall in Saint-Julien-de-la-Nef

- Coat of arms
- Location of Saint-Julien-de-la-Nef
- Location within France Location within Occitanie
- Coordinates: 43°57′57″N 3°41′21″E
- Country: France
- Region: Occitania
- Department: Gard
- Arrondissement: Le Vigan
- Canton: Le Vigan
- Intercommunality: Cévennes Gangeoises et Suménoises

Government
  - Mayor (2020–2026): Lucas Faidherbe
- Area^{1}: 8.83 km^{2} (3.41 sq mi)
- Elevation: 167 m (548 ft)
- Highest elevation: 529 m (1,736 ft)
- Lowest elevation: 149 m (489 ft)
- Population (2023): 143
  - Density: 16.2/km^{2} (41.9/sq mi)
- Time zone: UTC+01:00 (CET)
  - Summer (DST): UTC+02:00 (CEST)
- INSEE/Postal code: 30272 /30440
- ^{1} French Land Register data, which excludes lakes, ponds, glaciers > 1 km^{2} (0.386 sq mi or 247 acres) and river estuaries.

Saint-Julien-de-la-Nef (French pronunciation: [sɛ̃ ʒyljɛ̃ də la nɛf]; Languedocien: Sent Julian de la Nau) is a commune in the Gard department in southern France.

== Population ==
Historical population
Year	Pop.	±% p.a.
1968	86	—
1975	100	+2.18%
1982	99	−0.14%
1990	140	+4.43%
1999	119	−1.79%
2007	124	+0.52%
2012	123	−0.16%
2017	141	+2.77%
2023	143	+0.24%
Source: INSEE

== See also ==
- Communes of the Gard department
