= Campestre-et-Luc =

Commune in Occitanie, France

- Commune
- Coat of arms
- Location of Campestre-et-Luc
- Location within France Location within Occitanie
- Coordinates: 43°57′13″N 3°25′14″E
- Country: France
- Region: Occitania
- Department: Gard
- Arrondissement: Le Vigan
- Canton: Le Vigan
- Intercommunality: Pays Viganais

Government
  - Mayor (2020–2026): Jean-Marie Brunel
- Area^{1}: 38.1 km^{2} (14.7 sq mi)
- Elevation: 780 m (2,560 ft)
- Highest elevation: 914 m (2,999 ft)
- Lowest elevation: 502 m (1,647 ft)
- Population (2023): 163
  - Density: 4.28/km^{2} (11.1/sq mi)
- Time zone: UTC+01:00 (CET)
  - Summer (DST): UTC+02:00 (CEST)
- INSEE/Postal code: 30064 /30770
- ^{1} French Land Register data, which excludes lakes, ponds, glaciers > 1 km^{2} (0.386 sq mi or 247 acres) and river estuaries.

Campestre-et-Luc (French pronunciation: [kɑ̃pɛstʁ e lyk]; Occitan: Campèstre e lo Luc) is a commune in the Gard department in southern France.

== Population ==
Historical population
Year	Pop.	±% p.a.
1968	110	—
1975	94	−2.22%
1982	72	−3.74%
1990	80	+1.33%
1999	117	+4.31%
2007	111	−0.66%
2012	124	+2.24%
2017	99	−4.40%
2023	163	+8.67%
Source: INSEE

== See also ==
- Communes of the Gard department
