= Mandagout =

- Commune
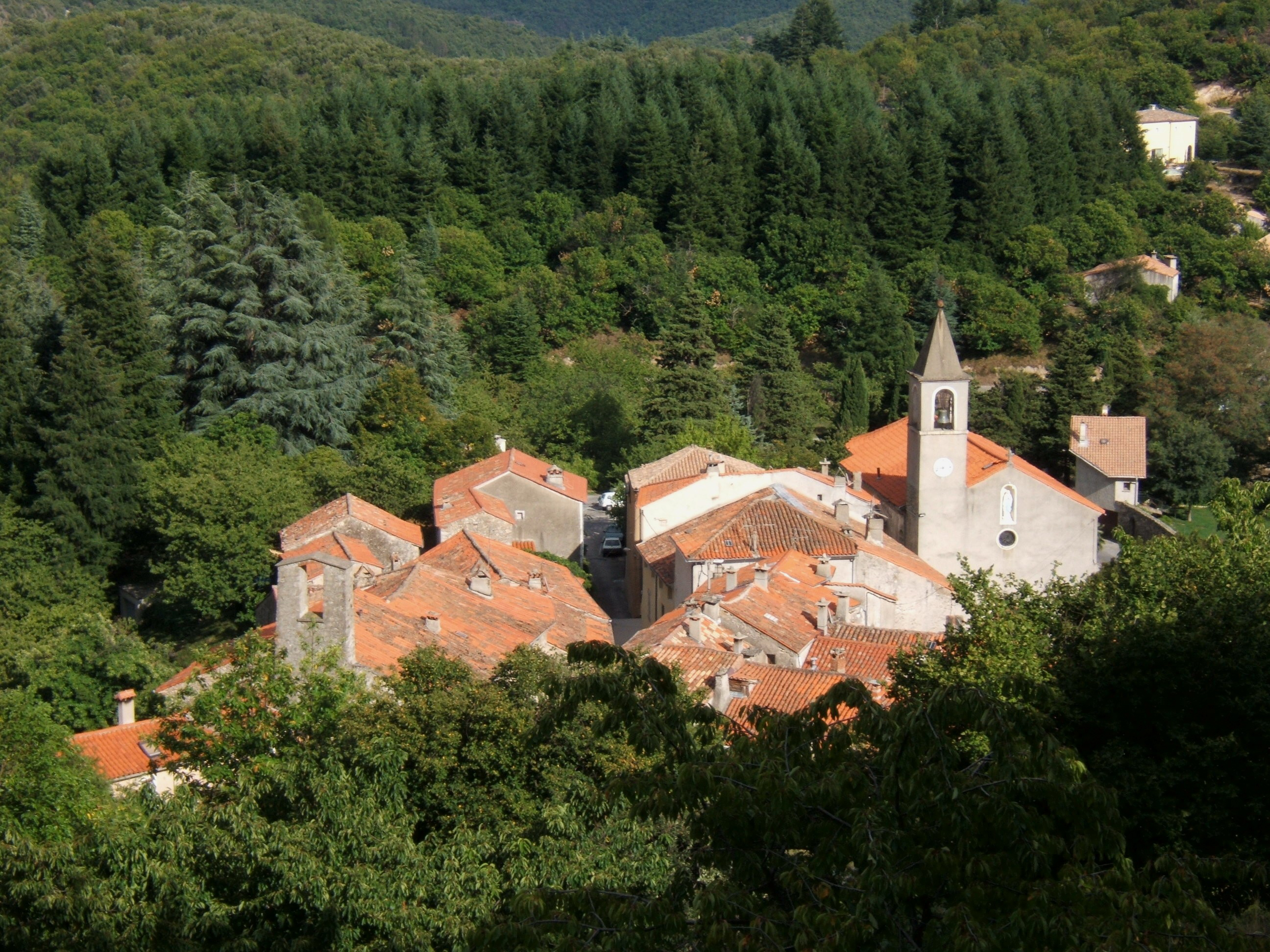
- Beaulieu

- Coat of arms
- Location of Mandagout
- Location within France Location within Occitanie
- Coordinates: 44°01′18″N 3°37′34″E
- Country: France
- Region: Occitania
- Department: Gard
- Arrondissement: Le Vigan
- Canton: Le Vigan
- Intercommunality: Pays Viganais

Government
  - Mayor (2020–2026): Emmanuel Grieu
- Area^{1}: 15.12 km^{2} (5.84 sq mi)
- Elevation: 550 m (1,800 ft)
- Highest elevation: 1,240 m (4,070 ft)
- Lowest elevation: 239 m (784 ft)
- Population (2023): 368
  - Density: 24.3/km^{2} (63.0/sq mi)
- Time zone: UTC+01:00 (CET)
  - Summer (DST): UTC+02:00 (CEST)
- INSEE/Postal code: 30154 /30120
- ^{1} French Land Register data, which excludes lakes, ponds, glaciers > 1 km^{2} (0.386 sq mi or 247 acres) and river estuaries.

Mandagout (French pronunciation: [mɑ̃daɡu]; Occitan: Mandagon) is a commune in the Gard department in southern France. The 18th-century French pharmacist, chemist and encyclopediste Jacques Montet (1722-1782) was born in Mandagout.

== Geography ==
=== Climate ===
Mandagout has a hot-summer Mediterranean climate (Köppen climate classification Csa) closely bordering on a warm-summer Mediterranean climate (Csb). The average annual temperature in Mandagout is 13.0 °C (55.4 °F). The average annual rainfall is 1,538.0 mm (60.55 in) with October as the wettest month. The temperatures are highest on average in July, at around 22.2 °C (72.0 °F), and lowest in January, at around 5.6 °C (42.1 °F). The highest temperature ever recorded in Mandagout was 44.2 °C (111.6 °F) on 28 June 2019; the coldest temperature ever recorded was −13.5 °C (7.7 °F) on 12 January 1987.

Climate data for Mandagout (1981−2010 normals, extremes 1983−2020)
| Month | Jan | Feb | Mar | Apr | May | Jun | Jul | Aug | Sep | Oct | Nov | Dec | Year |
|---|---|---|---|---|---|---|---|---|---|---|---|---|---|
| Record high °C (°F) | 19.8 (67.6) | 23.8 (74.8) | 26.9 (80.4) | 29.8 (85.6) | 31.5 (88.7) | 44.2 (111.6) | 38.7 (101.7) | 40.2 (104.4) | 35.4 (95.7) | 31.9 (89.4) | 23.0 (73.4) | 20.3 (68.5) | 44.2 (111.6) |
| Mean daily maximum °C (°F) | 8.9 (48.0) | 9.9 (49.8) | 13.2 (55.8) | 15.4 (59.7) | 19.8 (67.6) | 24.4 (75.9) | 28.3 (82.9) | 27.8 (82.0) | 22.9 (73.2) | 17.3 (63.1) | 12.1 (53.8) | 9.5 (49.1) | 17.5 (63.5) |
| Daily mean °C (°F) | 5.6 (42.1) | 6.1 (43.0) | 8.9 (48.0) | 11.1 (52.0) | 15.0 (59.0) | 18.9 (66.0) | 22.2 (72.0) | 21.9 (71.4) | 17.8 (64.0) | 13.5 (56.3) | 8.8 (47.8) | 6.3 (43.3) | 13.0 (55.4) |
| Mean daily minimum °C (°F) | 2.3 (36.1) | 2.3 (36.1) | 4.6 (40.3) | 6.7 (44.1) | 10.2 (50.4) | 13.4 (56.1) | 16.1 (61.0) | 16.0 (60.8) | 12.6 (54.7) | 9.8 (49.6) | 5.4 (41.7) | 3.1 (37.6) | 8.6 (47.5) |
| Record low °C (°F) | −13.5 (7.7) | −11.2 (11.8) | −9.2 (15.4) | −1.3 (29.7) | 1.5 (34.7) | 4.9 (40.8) | 7.8 (46.0) | 7.2 (45.0) | 4.2 (39.6) | −3.4 (25.9) | −5.9 (21.4) | −8.7 (16.3) | −13.5 (7.7) |
| Average precipitation mm (inches) | 139.5 (5.49) | 102.4 (4.03) | 78.5 (3.09) | 145.4 (5.72) | 117.4 (4.62) | 70.5 (2.78) | 37.9 (1.49) | 60.7 (2.39) | 161.6 (6.36) | 238.7 (9.40) | 208.3 (8.20) | 177.1 (6.97) | 1,538 (60.55) |
| Average precipitation days (≥ 1.0 mm) | 9.5 | 7.8 | 6.9 | 9.5 | 8.9 | 6.1 | 4.0 | 5.6 | 6.9 | 11.3 | 9.9 | 9.5 | 95.8 |
Source: Météo-France

== Population ==
Historical population
| Year | Pop. | ±% p.a. |
|---|---|---|
| 1968 | 296 | — |
| 1975 | 250 | −2.38% |
| 1982 | 255 | +0.28% |
| 1990 | 290 | +1.62% |
| 1999 | 331 | +1.48% |
| 2007 | 364 | +1.20% |
| 2012 | 393 | +1.54% |
| 2017 | 401 | +0.40% |
| 2023 | 368 | −1.42% |
Source: INSEE

== See also ==
- Communes of the Gard department
