= Saint-André-de-Majencoules =

- Commune
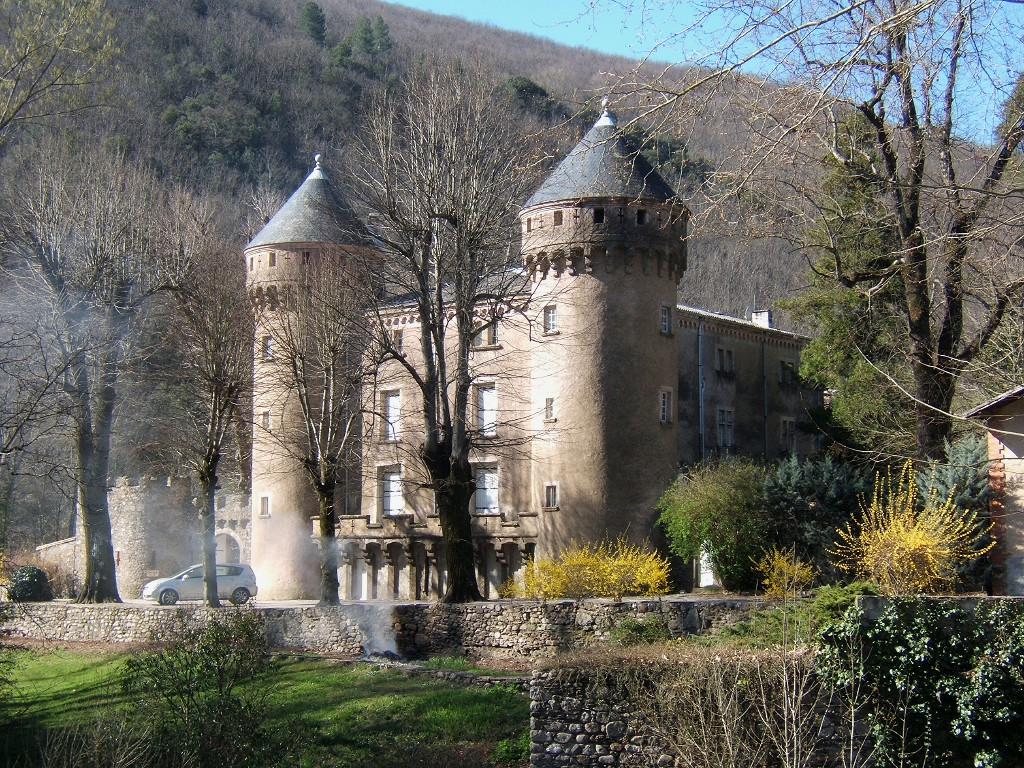
- Château du Rey

- Coat of arms
- Location of Saint-André-de-Majencoules
- Location within France Location within Occitanie
- Coordinates: 44°01′46″N 3°40′28″E
- Country: France
- Region: Occitania
- Department: Gard
- Arrondissement: Le Vigan
- Canton: Le Vigan

Government
  - Mayor (2020–2026): Christophe Boisson
- Area^{1}: 21.79 km^{2} (8.41 sq mi)
- Elevation: 352 m (1,155 ft)
- Highest elevation: 900 m (3,000 ft)
- Lowest elevation: 180 m (590 ft)
- Population (2023): 599
  - Density: 27.5/km^{2} (71.2/sq mi)
- Time zone: UTC+01:00 (CET)
  - Summer (DST): UTC+02:00 (CEST)
- INSEE/Postal code: 30229 /30570
- ^{1} French Land Register data, which excludes lakes, ponds, glaciers > 1 km^{2} (0.386 sq mi or 247 acres) and river estuaries.

Saint-André-de-Majencoules (French pronunciation: [sɛ̃tɑ̃dʁe de maʒɑ̃kul]; Occitan: Sent Andrieu de Magencolas [sent ãnˈðrjew de madʒẽnˈkulos]) is a commune in the Gard department in southern France.

== Population ==
Historical population
| Year | Pop. | ±% p.a. |
|---|---|---|
| 1968 | 661 | — |
| 1975 | 588 | −1.66% |
| 1982 | 547 | −1.03% |
| 1990 | 564 | +0.38% |
| 1999 | 556 | −0.16% |
| 2007 | 561 | +0.11% |
| 2012 | 631 | +2.38% |
| 2017 | 592 | −1.27% |
| 2023 | 599 | +0.20% |
Source: INSEE

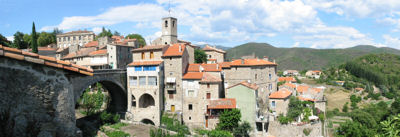

== See also ==
- Communes of the Gard department
