= Trèves, Gard =

Trèves
- Commune
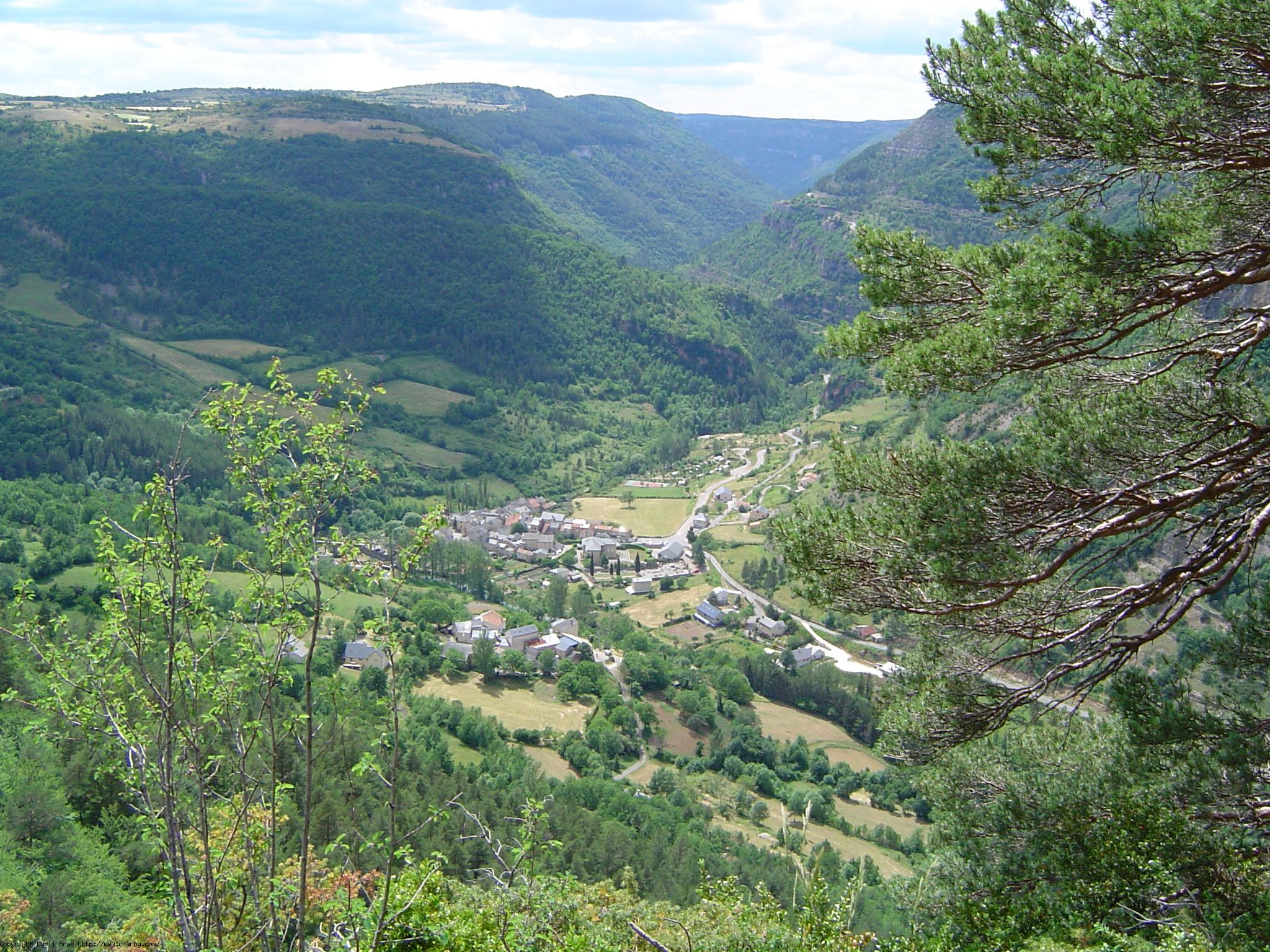
- A general view of Trèves

- Coat of arms
- Location of Trèves
- Location within France Location within Occitanie
- Coordinates: 44°04′44″N 3°23′21″E
- Country: France
- Region: Occitania
- Department: Gard
- Arrondissement: Le Vigan
- Canton: Le Vigan

Government
  - Mayor (2020–2026): Régis Valgalier
- Area^{1}: 26.59 km^{2} (10.27 sq mi)
- Elevation: 560 m (1,840 ft)
- Highest elevation: 1,282 m (4,206 ft)
- Lowest elevation: 514 m (1,686 ft)
- Population (2023): 116
  - Density: 4.36/km^{2} (11.3/sq mi)
- Time zone: UTC+01:00 (CET)
  - Summer (DST): UTC+02:00 (CEST)
- INSEE/Postal code: 30332 /30750
- ^{1} French Land Register data, which excludes lakes, ponds, glaciers > 1 km^{2} (0.386 sq mi or 247 acres) and river estuaries.

Trèves (French pronunciation: [tʁɛv]; Occitan: Trève) is a commune in the Gard department in southern France.

== Population ==
Historical population
Year	Pop.	±% p.a.
1968	151	—
1975	139	−1.18%
1982	129	−1.06%
1990	120	−0.90%
1999	119	−0.09%
2007	101	−2.03%
2012	119	+3.33%
2017	128	+1.47%
2023	116	−1.63%
Source: INSEE

== See also ==
- Communes of the Gard department
