= Roquedur =

- Commune
- Coat of arms
- Location of Roquedur
- Location within France Location within Occitanie
- Coordinates: 43°58′37″N 3°40′34″E
- Country: France
- Region: Occitania
- Department: Gard
- Arrondissement: Le Vigan
- Canton: Le Vigan
- Intercommunality: Pays Viganais

Government
  - Mayor (2020–2026): Bernard Sandré
- Area^{1}: 10.85 km^{2} (4.19 sq mi)
- Elevation: 700 m (2,300 ft)
- Highest elevation: 710 m (2,330 ft)
- Lowest elevation: 165 m (541 ft)
- Population (2023): 266
  - Density: 24.5/km^{2} (63.5/sq mi)
- Time zone: UTC+01:00 (CET)
  - Summer (DST): UTC+02:00 (CEST)
- INSEE/Postal code: 30220 /30440
- ^{1} French Land Register data, which excludes lakes, ponds, glaciers > 1 km^{2} (0.386 sq mi or 247 acres) and river estuaries.

Roquedur (French pronunciation: [ʁɔkdyʁ]; Occitan: Ròcadun) is a commune in the Gard department in southern France.

== Population ==
Historical population
| Year | Pop. | ±% p.a. |
|---|---|---|
| 1968 | 103 | — |
| 1975 | 121 | +2.33% |
| 1982 | 116 | −0.60% |
| 1990 | 133 | +1.72% |
| 1999 | 192 | +4.16% |
| 2007 | 224 | +1.95% |
| 2012 | 217 | −0.63% |
| 2017 | 257 | +3.44% |
| 2023 | 266 | +0.58% |
Source: INSEE

== See also ==
- Communes of the Gard department
