= Bez-et-Esparon =

Commune in Occitanie, France

- Commune
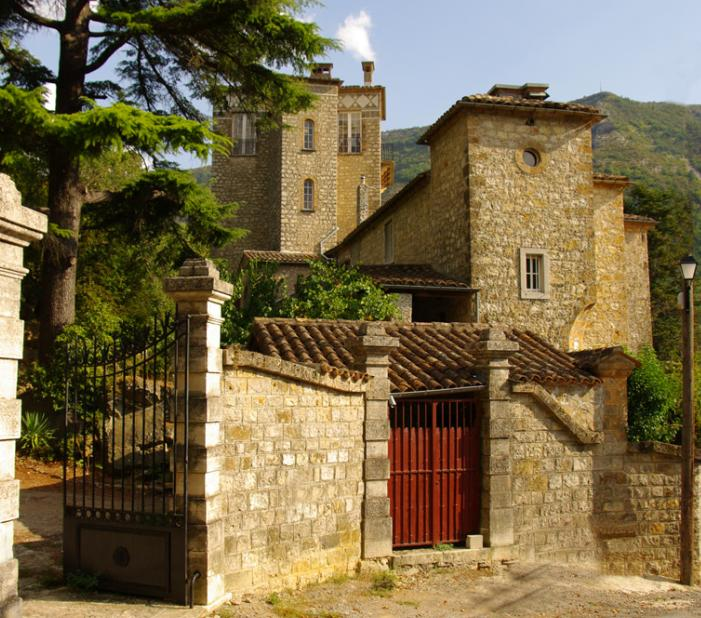
- The chateau of Bez

- Coat of arms
- Location of Bez-et-Esparon
- Location within France Location within Occitanie
- Coordinates: 43°58′22″N 3°31′53″E
- Country: France
- Region: Occitania
- Department: Gard
- Arrondissement: Le Vigan
- Canton: Le Vigan
- Intercommunality: Pays Viganais

Government
  - Mayor (2020–2026): Romaric Castor
- Area^{1}: 8.33 km^{2} (3.22 sq mi)
- Elevation: 314 m (1,030 ft)
- Highest elevation: 861 m (2,825 ft)
- Lowest elevation: 279 m (915 ft)
- Population (2023): 335
  - Density: 40.2/km^{2} (104/sq mi)
- Time zone: UTC+01:00 (CET)
  - Summer (DST): UTC+02:00 (CEST)
- INSEE/Postal code: 30038 /30120
- ^{1} French Land Register data, which excludes lakes, ponds, glaciers > 1 km^{2} (0.386 sq mi or 247 acres) and river estuaries.

Bez-et-Esparon (French pronunciation: [bɛz e ɛsparɔ̃]; Occitan: Beç e Esparron [bes e es.paˈru]) is a commune in the Gard department in southern France.

== Population ==
Historical population
Year	Pop.	±% p.a.
1968	377	—
1975	344	−1.30%
1982	338	−0.25%
1990	314	−0.92%
1999	301	−0.47%
2007	354	+2.05%
2012	352	−0.11%
2017	336	−0.93%
2023	335	−0.05%
Source: INSEE

== See also ==
- Communes of the Gard department
