= Lasalle, Gard =

Lasalle
- Commune
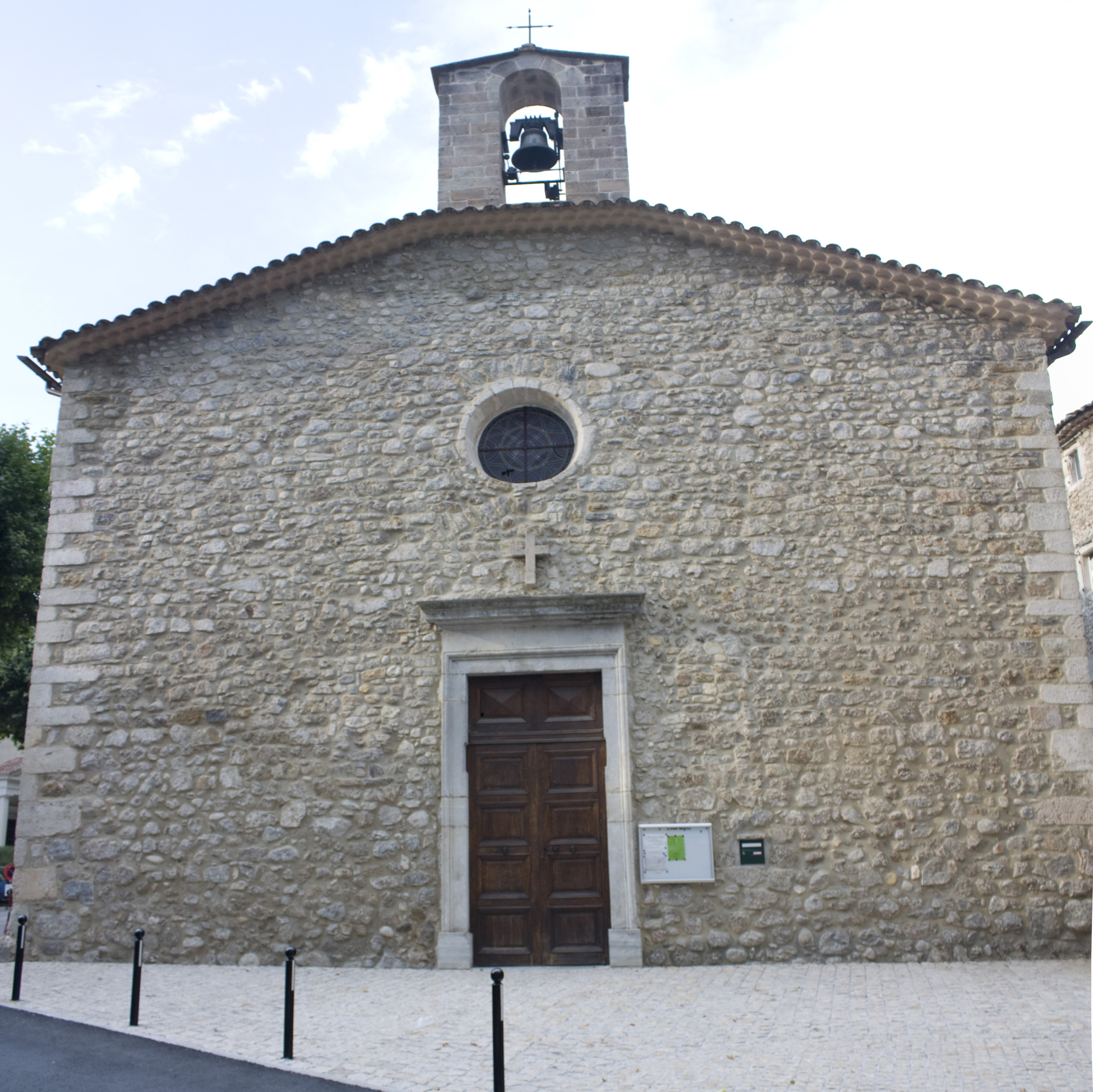
- The church of Lasalle

- Coat of arms
- Location of Lasalle
- Location within France Location within Occitanie
- Coordinates: 44°02′50″N 3°51′11″E
- Country: France
- Region: Occitania
- Department: Gard
- Arrondissement: Le Vigan
- Canton: Le Vigan

Government
  - Mayor (2020–2026): Henri de Latour
- Area^{1}: 10.1 km^{2} (3.9 sq mi)
- Elevation: 300 m (980 ft)
- Highest elevation: 621 m (2,037 ft)
- Lowest elevation: 210 m (690 ft)
- Population (2023): 1,202
  - Density: 119/km^{2} (308/sq mi)
- Time zone: UTC+01:00 (CET)
  - Summer (DST): UTC+02:00 (CEST)
- INSEE/Postal code: 30140 /30460
- ^{1} French Land Register data, which excludes lakes, ponds, glaciers > 1 km^{2} (0.386 sq mi or 247 acres) and river estuaries.

Lasalle (French pronunciation: [lasal]; Occitan: La Sala) is a commune in the Gard department in southern France. The historian and epigrapher William Seston (1900–1980) was born in Lassale.

== Population ==
Historical population
Year	Pop.	±% p.a.
1968	1,201	—
1975	1,018	−2.33%
1982	1,040	+0.31%
1990	1,007	−0.40%
1999	1,033	+0.28%
2007	1,055	+0.26%
2012	1,135	+1.47%
2017	1,140	+0.09%
2023	1,202	+0.89%
Source: INSEE

== See also ==
- Communes of the Gard department
