= Soudorgues =

- Commune
- Coat of arms
- Location of Soudorgues
- Location within France Location within Occitanie
- Coordinates: 44°04′00″N 3°49′51″E
- Country: France
- Region: Occitania
- Department: Gard
- Arrondissement: Le Vigan
- Canton: Le Vigan

Government
  - Mayor (2020–2026): Bertrand Van Peteghem
- Area^{1}: 25.7 km^{2} (9.9 sq mi)
- Elevation: 600 m (2,000 ft)
- Highest elevation: 1,166 m (3,825 ft)
- Lowest elevation: 289 m (948 ft)
- Population (2023): 269
  - Density: 10.5/km^{2} (27.1/sq mi)
- Time zone: UTC+01:00 (CET)
  - Summer (DST): UTC+02:00 (CEST)
- INSEE/Postal code: 30322 /30460
- ^{1} French Land Register data, which excludes lakes, ponds, glaciers > 1 km^{2} (0.386 sq mi or 247 acres) and river estuaries.

Soudorgues (French pronunciation: [sudɔʁɡ]; Occitan: Sodòrgues) is a commune in the Gard department in southern France.

== Population ==
Historical population
Year	Pop.	±% p.a.
1968	170	—
1975	187	+1.37%
1982	185	−0.15%
1990	199	+0.92%
1999	231	+1.67%
2007	271	+2.02%
2012	292	+1.50%
2017	275	−1.19%
2023	269	−0.37%
Source: INSEE

== See also ==
- Communes of the Gard department
