= Revens =

- Commune
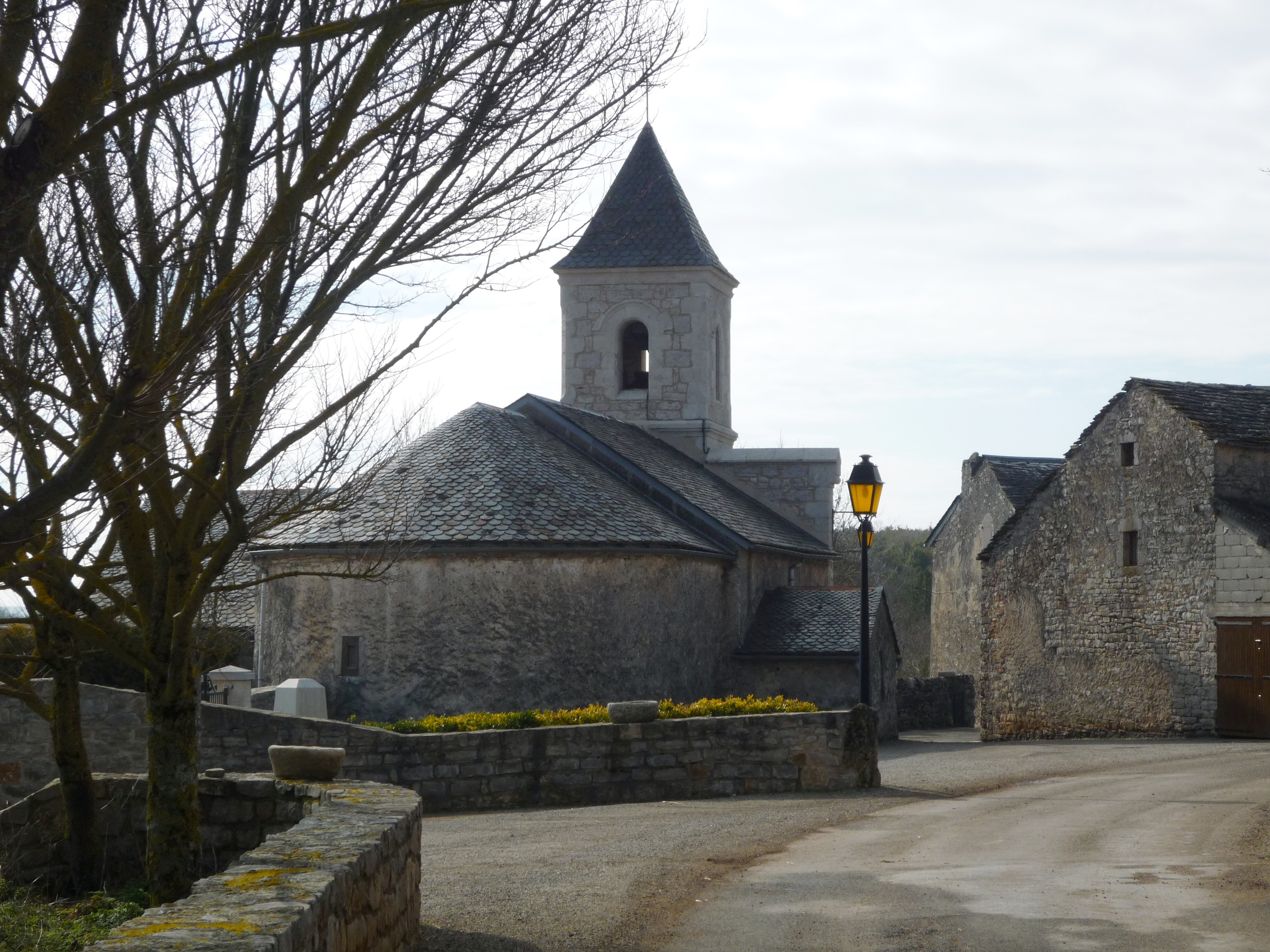
- The church of Revens

- Coat of arms
- Location of Revens
- Location within France Location within Occitanie
- Coordinates: 44°05′16″N 3°17′50″E
- Country: France
- Region: Occitania
- Department: Gard
- Arrondissement: Le Vigan
- Canton: Le Vigan

Government
  - Mayor (2020–2026): Madeleine Macq
- Area^{1}: 13.85 km^{2} (5.35 sq mi)
- Elevation: 796 m (2,612 ft)
- Highest elevation: 913 m (2,995 ft)
- Lowest elevation: 428 m (1,404 ft)
- Population (2023): 37
  - Density: 2.7/km^{2} (6.9/sq mi)
- Time zone: UTC+01:00 (CET)
  - Summer (DST): UTC+02:00 (CEST)
- INSEE/Postal code: 30213 /30750
- ^{1} French Land Register data, which excludes lakes, ponds, glaciers > 1 km^{2} (0.386 sq mi or 247 acres) and river estuaries.

Revens is a commune in the Gard department in southern France.

== Population ==
Historical population
| Year | Pop. | ±% p.a. |
|---|---|---|
| 1968 | 36 | — |
| 1975 | 27 | −4.03% |
| 1982 | 17 | −6.40% |
| 1990 | 30 | +7.36% |
| 1999 | 24 | −2.45% |
| 2007 | 28 | +1.95% |
| 2012 | 27 | −0.72% |
| 2017 | 21 | −4.90% |
| 2023 | 37 | +9.90% |
Source: INSEE

== See also ==
- Communes of the Gard department
