= Jacques Montet =

French chemist (1722–1782)

Jacques Montet (9 March 1722 in Beaulieu near Le Vigan – 13 November 1782 in Montpellier) was an 18th-century French pharmacist, chemist and encyclopediste.

== Biography ==
Jacques Montet was born in Beaulieu, near Vigan from Gabriel Montet and Madeleine Gaubert.

Thanks to an Englishman, whom he accompanied on his trips to Switzerland, his interest in the natural sciences was awakened, in particular for chemistry. So much so that his first visit to Paris led him to attend the lectures of Guillaume-François Rouelle.

Montet went then to Montpellier in order to follow a pharmacist training. In 1748, he became a member of the Académie des sciences et lettres de Montpellier. Later he became a demonstrator under Gabriel François Venel, whose lecture in chemistry he also benefited from.

Montet continued his research on various topics and also dealt with general natural history. His work on physics, natural history and agriculture in a part of the Cevennes were published in the Memoirs of the Academy of Sciences of Montpellier. He eventually wrote three articles for the volumes XV and XVI of the Encyclopédie von Denis Diderot und Jean le Rond d'Alembert, Tartre, Tournesol and Vert-de-gris, ou Verdet

In February 1769, he married Gillette Carchet from Montpellier, but the couple remained childless.

== Works ==
- L'Art de faire le vert-de-gris, Mémoires de l'Académie des sciences de Paris, 1750-1753-1756;
- Sur le sel lixiviel de tamaris, Mémoires de l'Académie des sciences, 1757;
- Sur un grand nombre de volcans éteints qu'on a trouvés dans le bas Languedoc, Mémoires de l'Académie des sciences de Paris, 1760;
- Description des Marais de Peccais|salins de Peccais, Mémoires de l'Académie des sciences de Paris, 1763;
- Sur la manière de conserver en tout temps les cristaux de l'alcali fixe, 1765;
- Sur la morsure de la vipère, 1773, etc.

== Bibliography ==
- René-Nicolas Dufriche Desgenettes: Éloges des Académiciens de Montpellier. Pour servir à l'histoire des sciences dans le XVIII^{e}. Bossange et Masson, Paris 1811, (p. 242–249).
- Pierre Larousse, Grand Dictionnaire universel du XIX^{e}, Vol. 11. Administration du grand Dictionnaire universel, Paris, (p. 505).
- Michel Nicolas: Histoire littéraire de Nimes, et des localités voisines qui forment actuellement le département du Gard. Ballivet et Fabre, Nîmes 1854, (p. 243)–245).
- Louis Dulieu: Apothicaires, académiciens de Montpellier. In: Revue d'histoire de la pharmacie, vol. 57 (1955), n° 145, (p. 87–91). (ISSN 0035-2349)
- Jacques Proust: Les encyclopédistes, la Société royale des sciences et l'Université de médecine de Montpellier in "Monspeliensis Hippocrates", 1968. In: Revue d'histoire de la pharmacie, Bd. 57 (1969), n° 202, (p. 452). (ISSN 0035-2349)
- Jacques-Alexandre Poitevin: Éloge de M. Montet, par M. Poitevin. Impr. de J. Martel aîné, Paris 1783.
