= Aulas =

Commune in Occitanie, France

- Commune
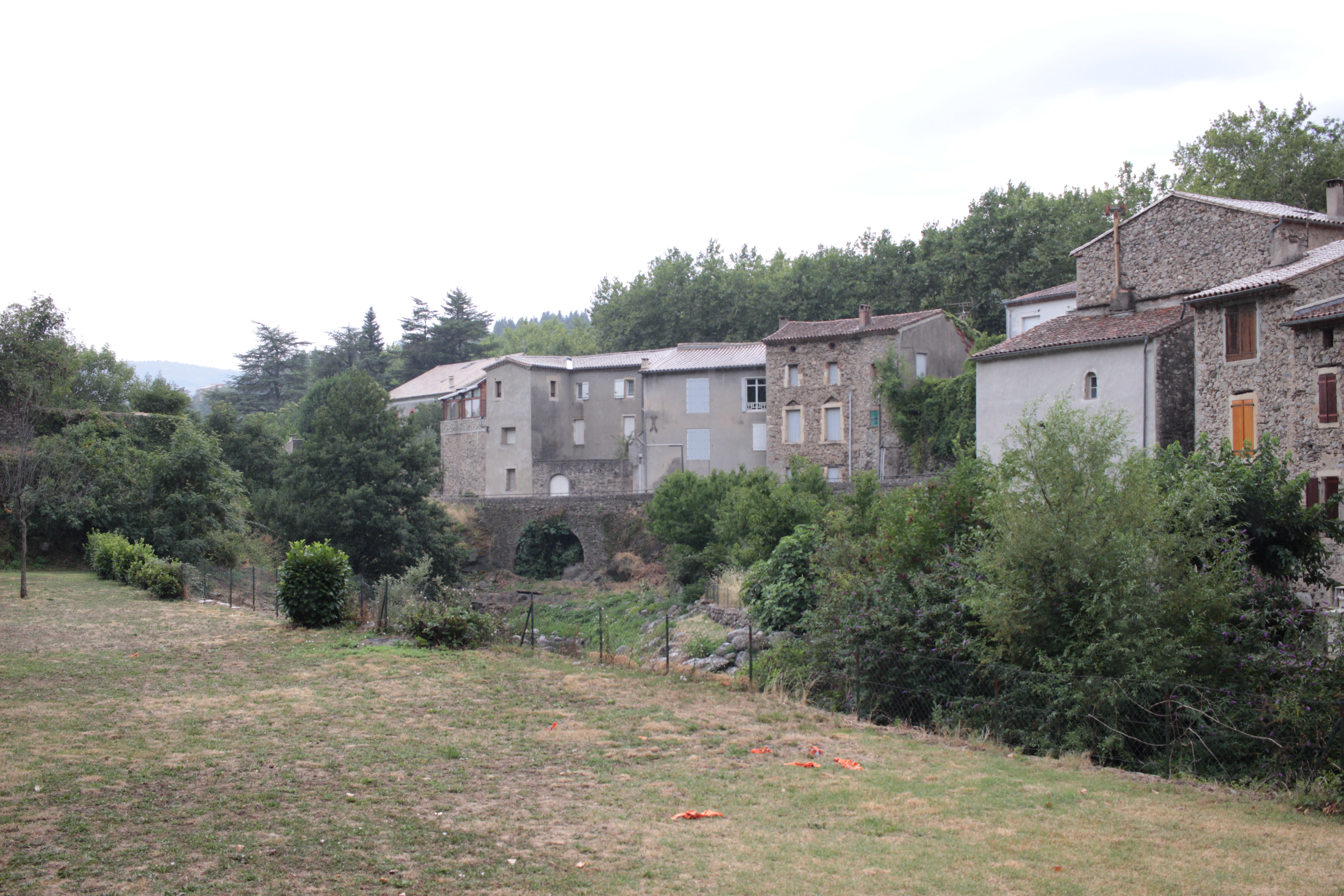

- Coat of arms
- Location of Aulas
- Location within France Location within Occitanie
- Coordinates: 44°00′04″N 3°35′14″E
- Country: France
- Region: Occitania
- Department: Gard
- Arrondissement: Le Vigan
- Canton: Le Vigan
- Intercommunality: CC Pays Viganais

Government
  - Mayor (2020–2026): Bruno Montet
- Area^{1}: 2.91 km^{2} (1.12 sq mi)
- Elevation: 316 m (1,037 ft)
- Highest elevation: 642 m (2,106 ft)
- Lowest elevation: 264 m (866 ft)
- Population (2023): 456
  - Density: 157/km^{2} (406/sq mi)
- Time zone: UTC+01:00 (CET)
  - Summer (DST): UTC+02:00 (CEST)
- INSEE/Postal code: 30024 /30120
- ^{1} French Land Register data, which excludes lakes, ponds, glaciers > 1 km^{2} (0.386 sq mi or 247 acres) and river estuaries.

Aulas (French pronunciation: [olas]; Occitan: Aulaç) is a commune in the Gard department in southern France.

== Population ==
Historical population
Year	Pop.	±% p.a.
1968	308	—
1975	296	−0.57%
1982	338	+1.91%
1990	386	+1.67%
1999	391	+0.14%
2007	445	+1.63%
2012	455	+0.45%
2017	477	+0.95%
2023	456	−0.75%
Source: INSEE

== See also ==
- Communes of the Gard department
