= Avèze, Gard =

Commune in Occitanie, France

Avèze
- Commune
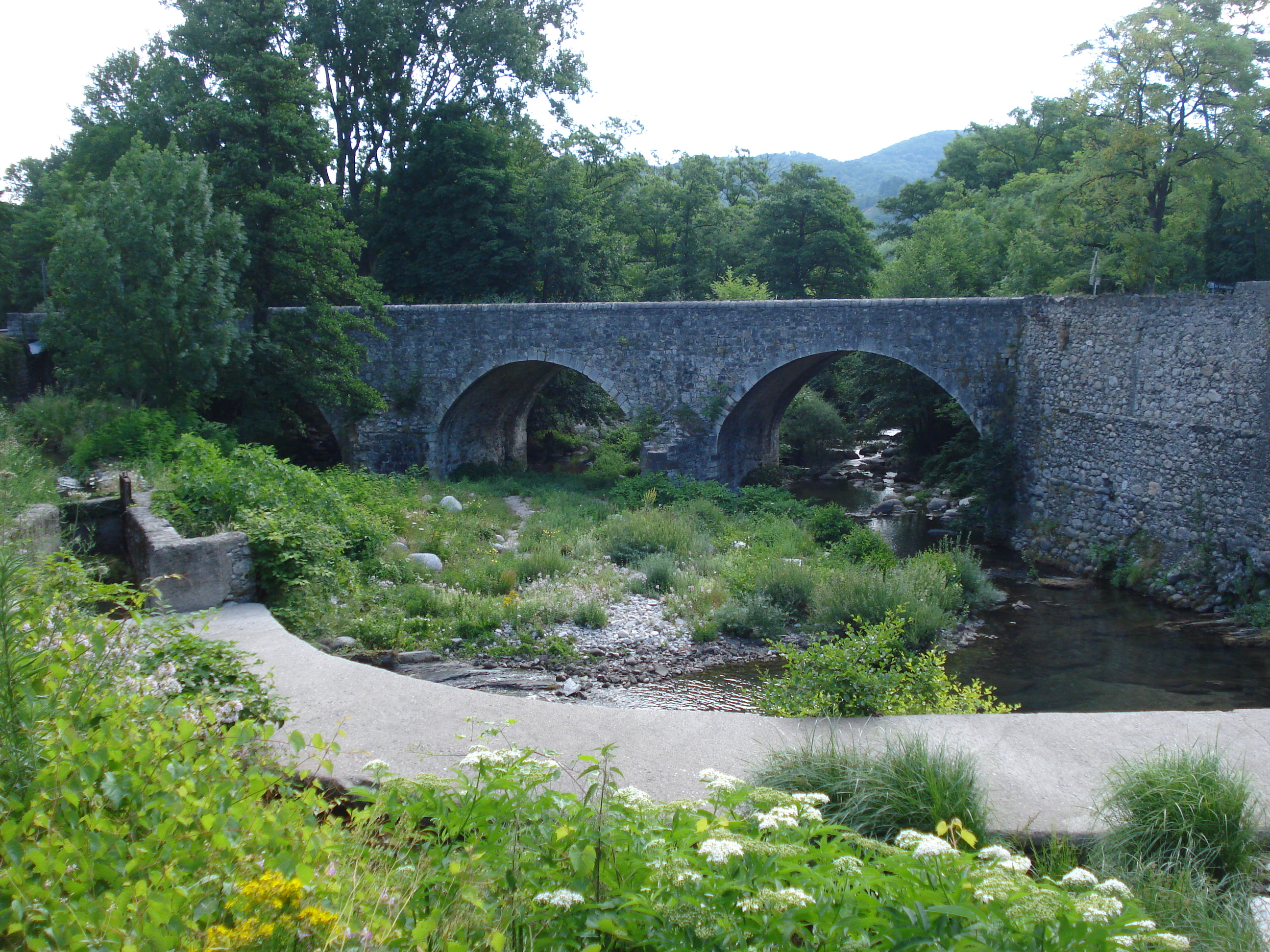
- A view of Avèze
- Location of Avèze
- Location within France Location within Occitanie
- Coordinates: 43°58′20″N 3°36′03″E
- Country: France
- Region: Occitania
- Department: Gard
- Arrondissement: Le Vigan
- Canton: Le Vigan
- Intercommunality: CC Pays Viganais

Government
  - Mayor (2020–2026): Martine Volle-Wild
- Area^{1}: 4.14 km^{2} (1.60 sq mi)
- Elevation: 252 m (827 ft)
- Highest elevation: 502 m (1,647 ft)
- Lowest elevation: 220 m (720 ft)
- Population (2023): 1,053
  - Density: 254/km^{2} (659/sq mi)
- Time zone: UTC+01:00 (CET)
  - Summer (DST): UTC+02:00 (CEST)
- INSEE/Postal code: 30026 /30120
- ^{1} French Land Register data, which excludes lakes, ponds, glaciers > 1 km^{2} (0.386 sq mi or 247 acres) and river estuaries.

Avèze (French pronunciation: [avɛz]; Occitan: Avesa) is a commune in the Gard department in southern France.

== Population ==
Historical population
Year	Pop.	±% p.a.
1968	884	—
1975	879	−0.08%
1982	983	+1.61%
1990	965	−0.23%
1999	1,013	+0.54%
2007	1,087	+0.89%
2012	1,081	−0.11%
2017	1,080	−0.02%
2023	1,053	−0.42%
Source: INSEE

== See also ==
- Communes of the Gard department
