= Dourbies =

- Commune
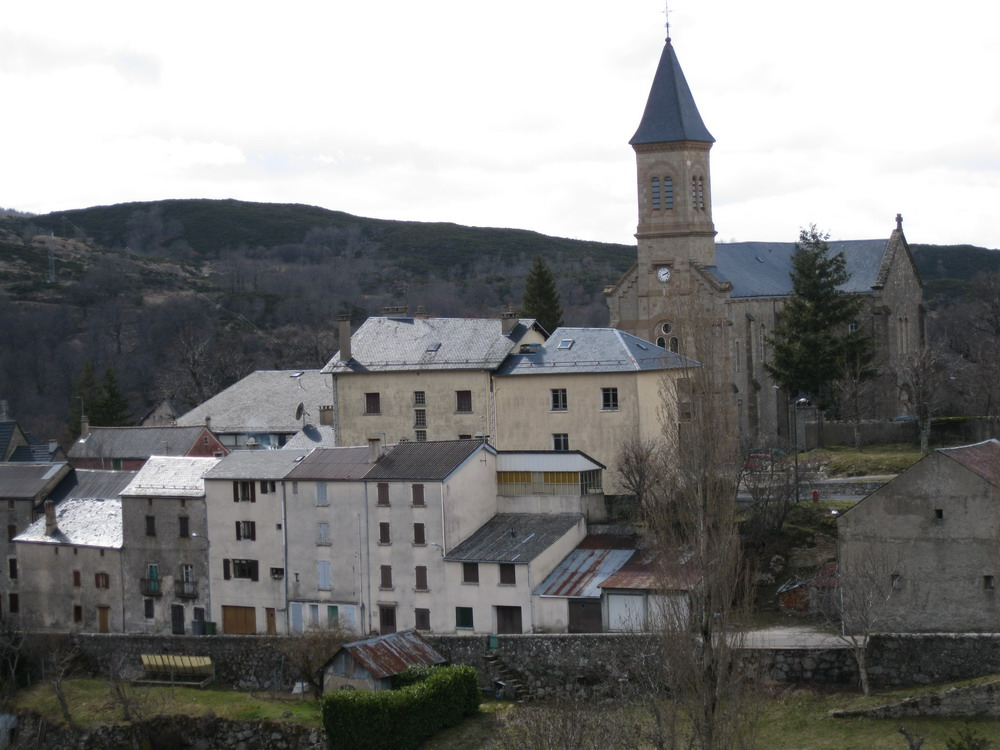
- A general view of Dourbies

- Coat of arms
- Location of Dourbies
- Location within France Location within Occitanie
- Coordinates: 44°03′54″N 3°26′50″E
- Country: France
- Region: Occitania
- Department: Gard
- Arrondissement: Le Vigan
- Canton: Le Vigan

Government
  - Mayor (2020–2026): Irène Lebeau
- Area^{1}: 60.88 km^{2} (23.51 sq mi)
- Elevation: 913 m (2,995 ft)
- Highest elevation: 1,440 m (4,720 ft)
- Lowest elevation: 621 m (2,037 ft)
- Population (2023): 177
  - Density: 2.91/km^{2} (7.53/sq mi)
- Time zone: UTC+01:00 (CET)
  - Summer (DST): UTC+02:00 (CEST)
- INSEE/Postal code: 30105 /30750
- ^{1} French Land Register data, which excludes lakes, ponds, glaciers > 1 km^{2} (0.386 sq mi or 247 acres) and river estuaries.

Dourbies (French pronunciation: [duʁbi]; Occitan: Dórbias) is a commune in the Gard department in southern France.

== Population ==
Historical population
Year	Pop.	±% p.a.
1968	308	—
1975	251	−2.88%
1982	223	−1.68%
1990	213	−0.57%
1999	204	−0.48%
2007	188	−1.02%
2012	171	−1.88%
2017	145	−3.24%
2023	177	+3.38%
Source: INSEE

== See also ==
- Communes of the Gard department
