= Conqueyrac =

- Commune
- Coat of arms
- Location of Conqueyrac
- Location within France Location within Occitanie
- Coordinates: 43°56′51″N 3°54′33″E
- Country: France
- Region: Occitania
- Department: Gard
- Arrondissement: Le Vigan
- Canton: Le Vigan
- Intercommunality: Piémont Cévenol

Government
  - Mayor (2020–2026): Jacques Dautheville
- Area^{1}: 27.18 km^{2} (10.49 sq mi)
- Elevation: 160 m (520 ft)
- Highest elevation: 368 m (1,207 ft)
- Lowest elevation: 100 m (330 ft)
- Population (2023): 117
  - Density: 4.30/km^{2} (11.1/sq mi)
- Time zone: UTC+01:00 (CET)
  - Summer (DST): UTC+02:00 (CEST)
- INSEE/Postal code: 30093 /30170
- ^{1} French Land Register data, which excludes lakes, ponds, glaciers > 1 km^{2} (0.386 sq mi or 247 acres) and river estuaries.

Conqueyrac (French pronunciation: [kɔ̃kɛʁak]; Occitan: Concairac) is a commune in the Gard department in southern France.

== Climate ==
Temperatures reached 44.1 °C (111.4 °F) in Conqueyrac and Saint-Christol-lès-Alès on 12 August 2003 during the 2003 European heat wave. They were France's highest temperatures ever recorded until 28 June 2019, when temperatures reached as high as 46.0 °C (114.8 °F) in southern France.

Climate data for Conqueyrac (1981−2010 normals, extremes 1991−2020)
Month	Jan	Feb	Mar	Apr	May	Jun	Jul	Aug	Sep	Oct	Nov	Dec	Year
Record high °C (°F)	24.0 (75.2)	24.9 (76.8)	30.5 (86.9)	33.1 (91.6)	37.5 (99.5)	43.5 (110.3)	41.0 (105.8)	44.1 (111.4)	37.3 (99.1)	35.4 (95.7)	26.4 (79.5)	22.5 (72.5)	44.1 (111.4)
Mean daily maximum °C (°F)	11.7 (53.1)	13.3 (55.9)	17.5 (63.5)	20.2 (68.4)	24.7 (76.5)	29.5 (85.1)	32.9 (91.2)	32.6 (90.7)	26.6 (79.9)	20.8 (69.4)	15.4 (59.7)	11.7 (53.1)	21.5 (70.7)
Daily mean °C (°F)	6.3 (43.3)	7.1 (44.8)	10.6 (51.1)	13.6 (56.5)	17.7 (63.9)	21.9 (71.4)	24.8 (76.6)	24.5 (76.1)	19.5 (67.1)	15.2 (59.4)	10.0 (50.0)	6.6 (43.9)	14.9 (58.8)
Mean daily minimum °C (°F)	0.9 (33.6)	0.9 (33.6)	3.8 (38.8)	7.0 (44.6)	10.8 (51.4)	14.3 (57.7)	16.8 (62.2)	16.5 (61.7)	12.4 (54.3)	9.7 (49.5)	4.6 (40.3)	1.5 (34.7)	8.3 (46.9)
Record low °C (°F)	−11.0 (12.2)	−14.4 (6.1)	−11.0 (12.2)	−2.4 (27.7)	0.7 (33.3)	5.4 (41.7)	8.9 (48.0)	6.5 (43.7)	2.9 (37.2)	−3.7 (25.3)	−9.5 (14.9)	−11.5 (11.3)	−14.4 (6.1)
Average precipitation mm (inches)	92.7 (3.65)	61.0 (2.40)	57.6 (2.27)	91.0 (3.58)	90.0 (3.54)	54.4 (2.14)	30.6 (1.20)	45.0 (1.77)	179.5 (7.07)	175.0 (6.89)	117.9 (4.64)	128.5 (5.06)	1,123.2 (44.22)
Average precipitation days (≥ 1.0 mm)	7.0	5.0	4.6	7.1	6.9	5.0	3.6	4.7	6.3	8.7	8.2	7.1	74.3
Source: Météo-France

== Population ==
Historical population
Year	Pop.	±% p.a.
1968	83	—
1975	82	−0.17%
1982	123	+5.96%
1990	133	+0.98%
1999	122	−0.95%
2007	102	−2.21%
2012	112	+1.89%
2017	97	−2.83%
2023	117	+3.17%
Source: INSEE

== See also ==
- Communes of the Gard department
