= Arrigas =

Commune in Occitanie, France

- Commune
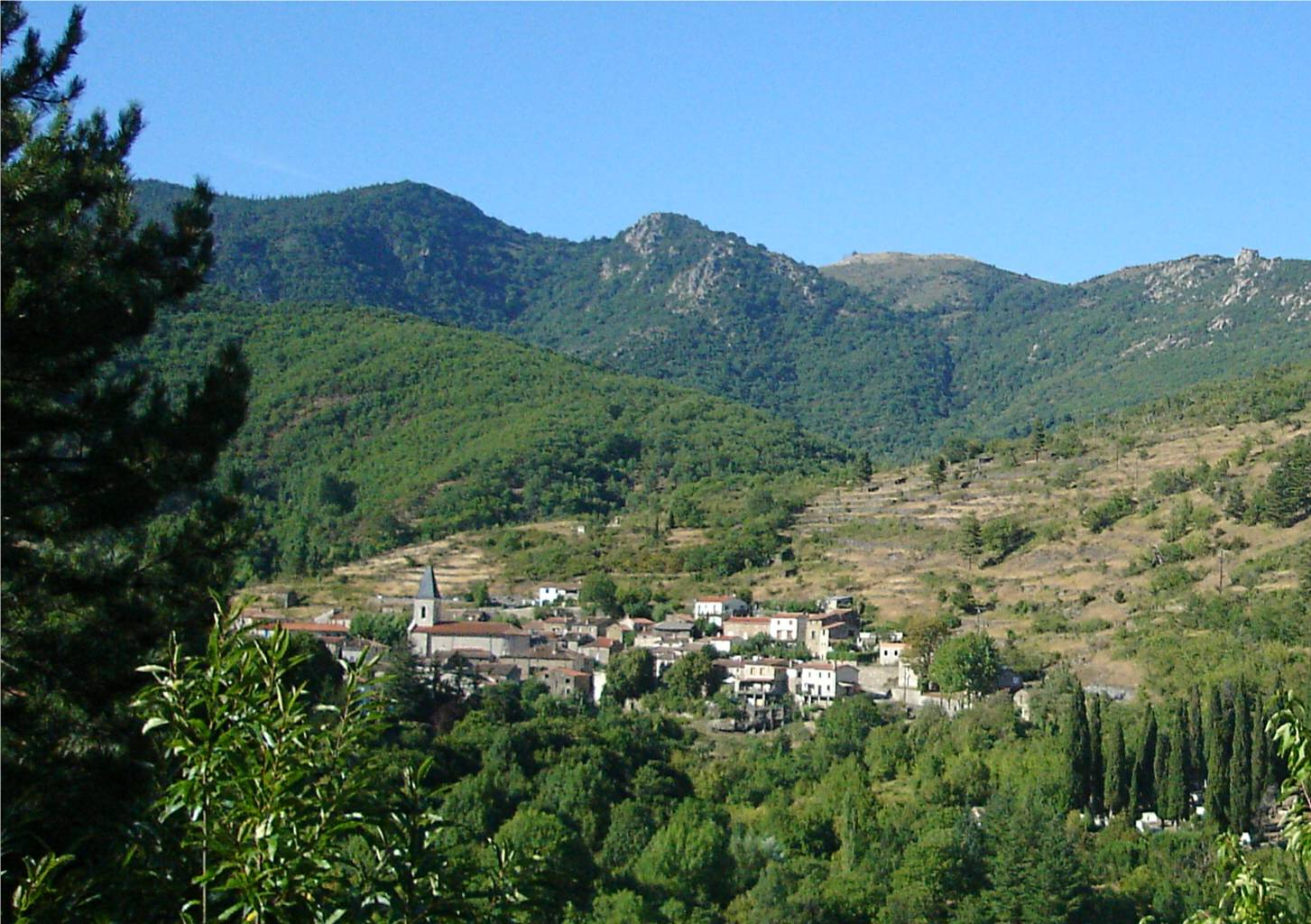
- A general view of Arrigas

- Coat of arms
- Location of Arrigas
- Location within France Location within Occitanie
- Coordinates: 43°59′24″N 3°28′52″E
- Country: France
- Region: Occitania
- Department: Gard
- Arrondissement: Le Vigan
- Canton: Le Vigan
- Intercommunality: CC Pays Viganais

Government
  - Mayor (2020–2026): Régis Bayle
- Area^{1}: 20.28 km^{2} (7.83 sq mi)
- Elevation: 500 m (1,600 ft)
- Highest elevation: 1,414 m (4,639 ft)
- Lowest elevation: 339 m (1,112 ft)
- Population (2023): 219
  - Density: 10.8/km^{2} (28.0/sq mi)
- Time zone: UTC+01:00 (CET)
  - Summer (DST): UTC+02:00 (CEST)
- INSEE/Postal code: 30017 /30770
- ^{1} French Land Register data, which excludes lakes, ponds, glaciers > 1 km^{2} (0.386 sq mi or 247 acres) and river estuaries.

Arrigas is a commune in the Gard department in southern France.

== Geography ==
The village is in the Cévennes, above the D999 road between Le Vigan and Alzon.

== History ==
Arrigas possesses a number of Megalithic remains including the dolmen of Arrigas on the route to Peyraube, and the dolmen of Peyre Cabussélado near the border with the commune of Arre. There are also three knocked-over menhirs at the mountain pass de Vernes, and more lower down at the place called Troulhas.

The village itself was founded in the 12th century by a colony of Benedictine monks under the dependency of St Victor of Marseille; a church is mentioned in 1113 and a monastery in 1135. By the 14th century, during the Hundred Years' War, the church was fortified.

During the French Wars of Religion the d'Albignac family, lords (seigneurs) of Arrigas, embraced the Reformation, alongside part of the population. But later their loyalty to the Crown led the d'Albignacs to change camp. In 1625, when Henri, duc de Rohan led the uprising of the Protestants of Languedoc, Charles d'Albignac took up the Catholic cause of the King, Louis XIII.

His castle at the Pont d'Arre was taken by the Protestant zealots, while the fortified church of Arrigas was almost completely destroyed. Some months later, at the Siege of Creissels, Charles d'Albignac stopped the advance of the troops of Rohan, and afterwards he was elevated by the King to become the Baron d'Arre.

After the destruction of the Pont d'Arre, the d'Albignac family built the château of Arrigas. Louis-Alexandre d'Albignac was born here in 1739 and became a Lieutenant-General in the armies of the King, then a général de division in the Revolutionary and Imperial armies, decorated with the royal Order of Saint Louis and the Imperial Légion d'honneur.

After a remarkable career under the Ancien Régime, d'Albignac put himself in the service of the French Revolution and accepted becoming the first mayor of Le Vigan (the main town of the region) in 1790. He took up service against the enemies of the Revolution in the Camp of Jales, and then served in the army, either the armies of the Alps or the Rhine. He is the most illustrious of the children of Arrigas, although he died in his own house in Le Vigan in 1825.

There are communal (3 day) fetes in mid July and at the end of August.

== Population ==
Historical population
Year	Pop.	±% p.a.
1968	234	—
1975	199	−2.29%
1982	187	−0.88%
1990	175	−0.83%
1999	194	+1.15%
2007	185	−0.59%
2012	201	+1.67%
2017	211	+0.98%
2023	219	+0.62%
Source: INSEE

== Estelle ==
The hamlet of Estelle lies by the L'Estelle stream south west of Arrigas. The hamlet is mentioned as far back as 1315 and the stream in 1371. On a visit in 2012, a reporter for Midi-Libre described the hamlet as so tucked away as to be barely visible except from the air. The houses are almost all renovated, many are holiday homes.

== See also ==
- Communes of the Gard department
