= L'Estréchure =

- Commune
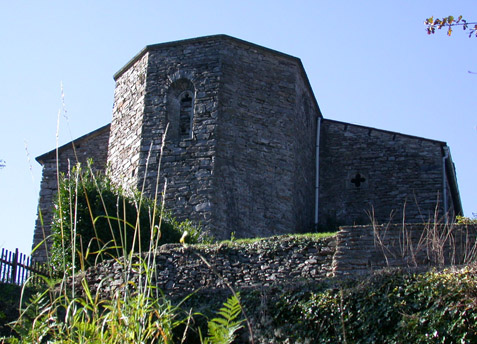
- The church of L'Estréchure

- Coat of arms
- Location of L'Estréchure
- Location within France Location within Occitanie
- Coordinates: 44°06′33″N 3°47′02″E
- Country: France
- Region: Occitania
- Department: Gard
- Arrondissement: Le Vigan
- Canton: Le Vigan

Government
  - Mayor (2023–2026): Jacques Hilaire
- Area^{1}: 19.34 km^{2} (7.47 sq mi)
- Elevation: 302 m (991 ft)
- Highest elevation: 1,166 m (3,825 ft)
- Lowest elevation: 271 m (889 ft)
- Population (2023): 151
  - Density: 7.81/km^{2} (20.2/sq mi)
- Time zone: UTC+01:00 (CET)
  - Summer (DST): UTC+02:00 (CEST)
- INSEE/Postal code: 30108 /30124
- ^{1} French Land Register data, which excludes lakes, ponds, glaciers > 1 km^{2} (0.386 sq mi or 247 acres) and river estuaries.

L'Estréchure (French pronunciation: [lɛstʁeʃyʁ]; Occitan: L'Estrechura) is a commune in the Gard department in southern France.

== Population ==
Historical population
Year	Pop.	±% p.a.
1968	176	—
1975	158	−1.53%
1982	150	−0.74%
1990	140	−0.86%
1999	143	+0.24%
2007	164	+1.73%
2012	173	+1.07%
2017	161	−1.43%
2023	151	−1.06%
Source: INSEE

== See also ==
- Communes of the Gard department
