= Les Plantiers =

- Commune
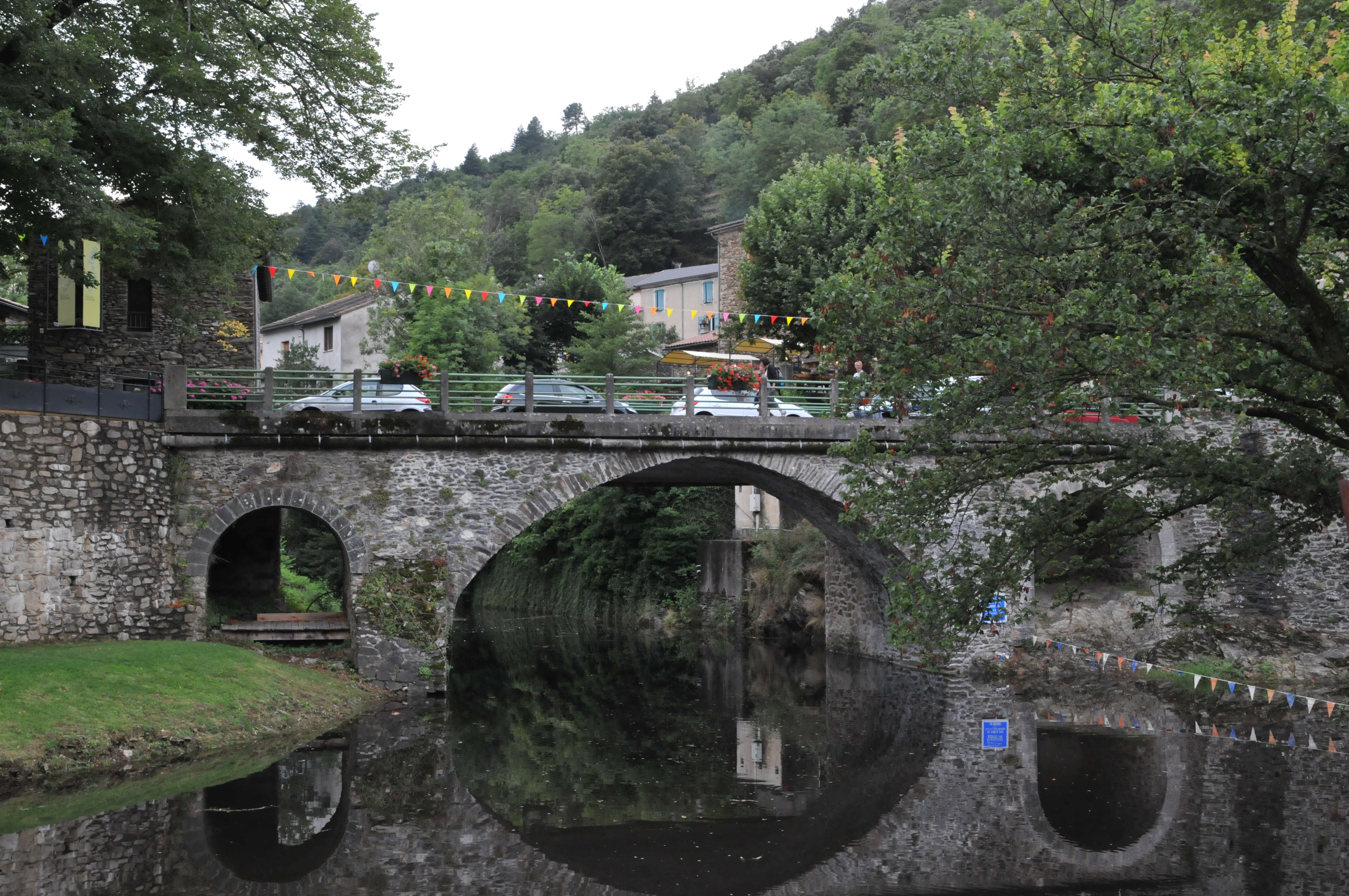
- The bridge in Les Plantiers

- Coat of arms
- Location of Les Plantiers
- Location within France Location within Occitanie
- Coordinates: 44°07′02″N 3°43′26″E
- Country: France
- Region: Occitania
- Department: Gard
- Arrondissement: Le Vigan
- Canton: Le Vigan
- Intercommunality: Causses Aigoual Cévennes

Government
  - Mayor (2024–2026): Alexis Bosio
- Area^{1}: 30.83 km^{2} (11.90 sq mi)
- Elevation: 416 m (1,365 ft)
- Highest elevation: 1,069 m (3,507 ft)
- Lowest elevation: 331 m (1,086 ft)
- Population (2023): 228
  - Density: 7.40/km^{2} (19.2/sq mi)
- Time zone: UTC+01:00 (CET)
  - Summer (DST): UTC+02:00 (CEST)
- INSEE/Postal code: 30198 /30122
- ^{1} French Land Register data, which excludes lakes, ponds, glaciers > 1 km^{2} (0.386 sq mi or 247 acres) and river estuaries.

Les Plantiers (French pronunciation: [le plɑ̃tje]; Occitan: Los Plantièrs) is a commune in the Gard department in southern France.

== Population ==
Historical population
Year	Pop.	±% p.a.
1968	257	—
1975	227	−1.76%
1982	228	+0.06%
1990	221	−0.39%
1999	228	+0.35%
2007	250	+1.16%
2012	233	−1.40%
2017	257	+1.98%
2023	228	−1.98%
Source: INSEE

== See also ==
- Communes of the Gard department
