= Saint-Martial, Gard =

Saint-Martial
- Commune
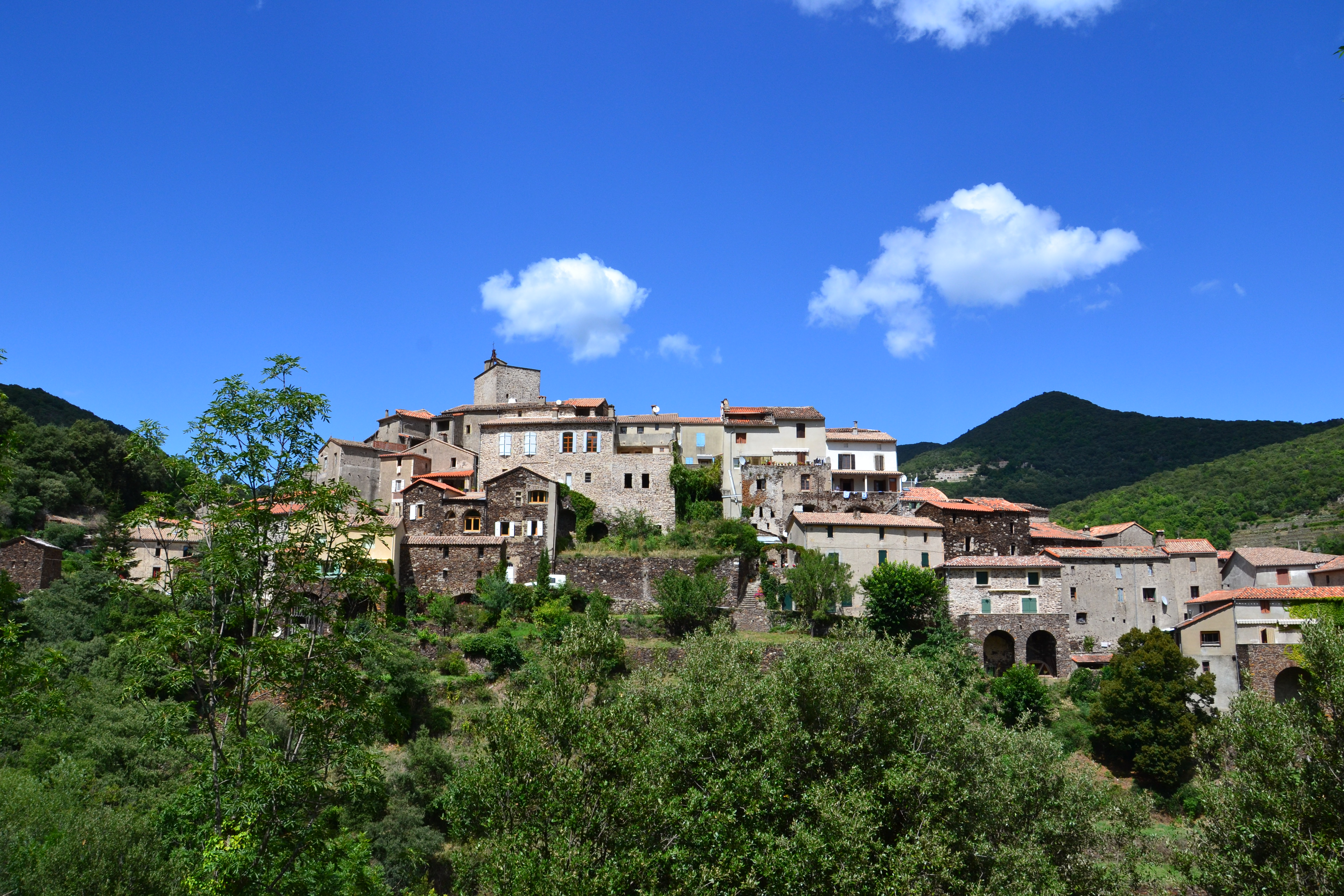
- A general view of Saint-Martial

- Coat of arms
- Location of Saint-Martial
- Location within France Location within Occitanie
- Coordinates: 44°02′07″N 3°44′12″E
- Country: France
- Region: Occitania
- Department: Gard
- Arrondissement: Le Vigan
- Canton: Le Vigan
- Intercommunality: Cévennes Gangeoises et Suménoises

Government
  - Mayor (2020–2026): Françoise Jutteau
- Area^{1}: 17.16 km^{2} (6.63 sq mi)
- Elevation: 462 m (1,516 ft)
- Highest elevation: 1,125 m (3,691 ft)
- Lowest elevation: 276 m (906 ft)
- Population (2023): 177
  - Density: 10.3/km^{2} (26.7/sq mi)
- Time zone: UTC+01:00 (CET)
  - Summer (DST): UTC+02:00 (CEST)
- INSEE/Postal code: 30283 /30440
- ^{1} French Land Register data, which excludes lakes, ponds, glaciers > 1 km^{2} (0.386 sq mi or 247 acres) and river estuaries.

Saint-Martial (French pronunciation: [sɛ̃ maʁsjal]; Occitan: Sant Marçal) is a commune in the Gard department in southern France.

== Geography ==
=== Climate ===
Saint-Martial has a hot-summer Mediterranean climate (Köppen climate classification Csa). The average annual temperature in Saint-Martial is 14.0 °C (57.2 °F). The average annual rainfall is 1,247.1 mm (49.10 in) with October as the wettest month. The temperatures are highest on average in July, at around 23.0 °C (73.4 °F), and lowest in January, at around 6.3 °C (43.3 °F). The highest temperature ever recorded in Saint-Martial was 41.7 °C (107.1 °F) on 28 June 2019; the coldest temperature ever recorded was −10.4 °C (13.3 °F) on 12 February 2012.

Climate data for Saint-Martial (1991−2020 normals, extremes 1998−present)
Month	Jan	Feb	Mar	Apr	May	Jun	Jul	Aug	Sep	Oct	Nov	Dec	Year
Record high °C (°F)	21.4 (70.5)	23.4 (74.1)	26.8 (80.2)	30.4 (86.7)	31.8 (89.2)	41.7 (107.1)	37.2 (99.0)	39.8 (103.6)	34.3 (93.7)	32.2 (90.0)	24.3 (75.7)	21.1 (70.0)	41.7 (107.1)
Mean daily maximum °C (°F)	9.9 (49.8)	10.9 (51.6)	14.4 (57.9)	17.4 (63.3)	21.5 (70.7)	26.6 (79.9)	29.4 (84.9)	29.0 (84.2)	24.3 (75.7)	18.8 (65.8)	13.4 (56.1)	10.6 (51.1)	18.9 (66.0)
Daily mean °C (°F)	6.3 (43.3)	6.7 (44.1)	9.7 (49.5)	12.5 (54.5)	16.1 (61.0)	20.5 (68.9)	23.0 (73.4)	22.7 (72.9)	18.8 (65.8)	14.6 (58.3)	9.7 (49.5)	7.0 (44.6)	14.0 (57.2)
Mean daily minimum °C (°F)	2.6 (36.7)	2.5 (36.5)	5.0 (41.0)	7.6 (45.7)	10.8 (51.4)	14.5 (58.1)	16.7 (62.1)	16.5 (61.7)	13.3 (55.9)	10.4 (50.7)	6.1 (43.0)	3.4 (38.1)	9.1 (48.4)
Record low °C (°F)	−8.3 (17.1)	−10.4 (13.3)	−8.3 (17.1)	0.0 (32.0)	2.3 (36.1)	5.0 (41.0)	8.0 (46.4)	9.7 (49.5)	5.6 (42.1)	−3.3 (26.1)	−6.1 (21.0)	−8.3 (17.1)	−10.4 (13.3)
Average precipitation mm (inches)	95.5 (3.76)	71.6 (2.82)	97.4 (3.83)	116.5 (4.59)	110.3 (4.34)	58.3 (2.30)	42.9 (1.69)	61.2 (2.41)	128.7 (5.07)	179.2 (7.06)	177.9 (7.00)	107.6 (4.24)	1,247.1 (49.10)
Average precipitation days (≥ 1.0 mm)	7.3	6.2	6.9	8.2	8.4	5.4	4.3	4.9	5.5	9.9	9.6	7.4	83.8
Source: Météo-France

== Population ==
Historical population
Year	Pop.	±% p.a.
1968	223	—
1975	201	−1.47%
1982	171	−2.28%
1990	188	+1.19%
1999	156	−2.05%
2007	190	+2.50%
2012	183	−0.75%
2017	179	−0.44%
2023	177	−0.19%
Source: INSEE

== See also ==
- Communes of the Gard department
