= Arre, Gard =

Commune in Occitanie, France

Arre
- Commune
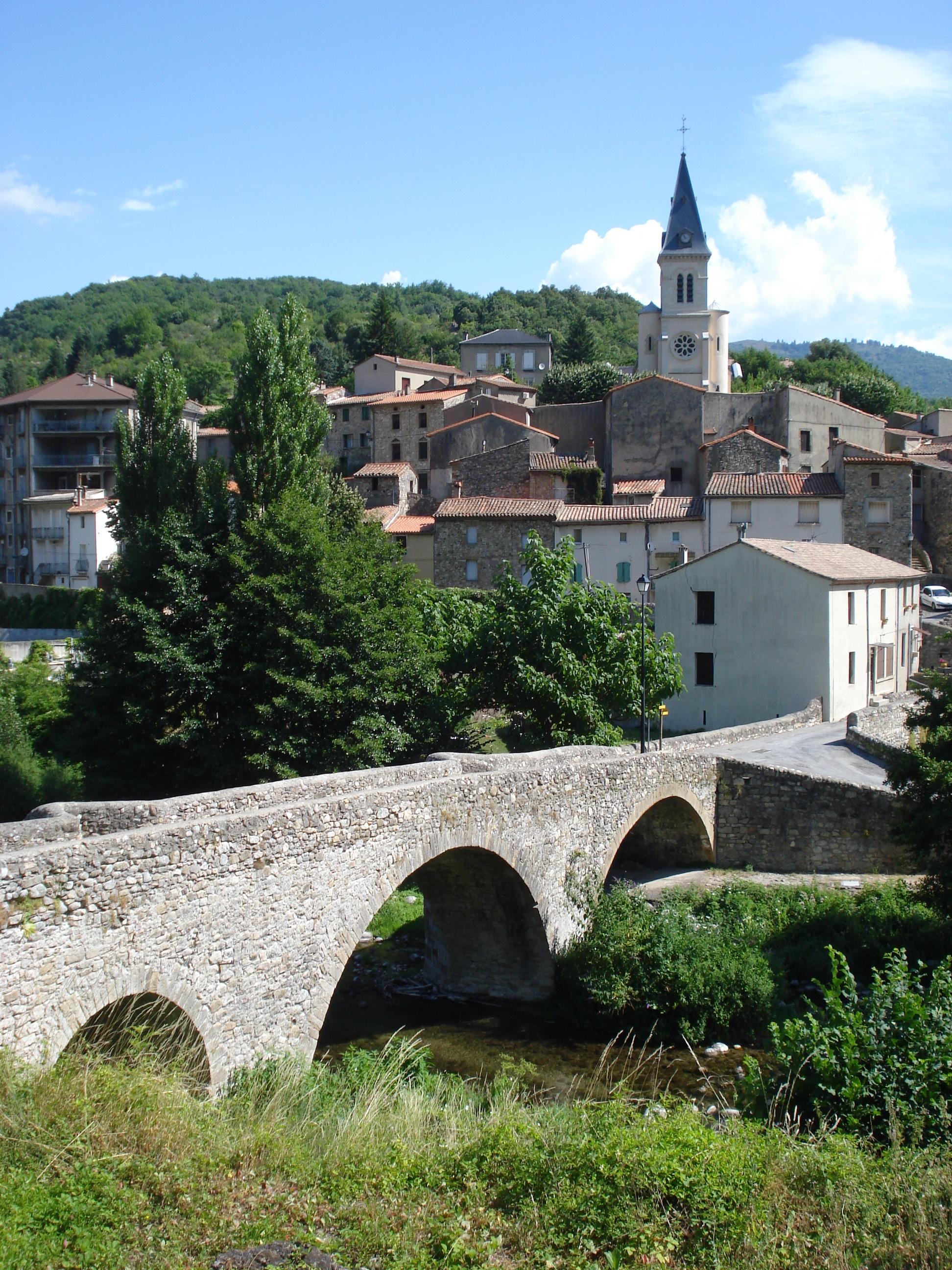
- A general view of Arre

- Coat of arms
- Location of Arre
- Location within France Location within Occitanie
- Coordinates: 43°58′02″N 3°31′10″E
- Country: France
- Region: Occitania
- Department: Gard
- Arrondissement: Le Vigan
- Canton: Le Vigan
- Intercommunality: CC Pays Viganais

Government
  - Mayor (2020–2026): Stéphane Malet
- Area^{1}: 7.26 km^{2} (2.80 sq mi)
- Elevation: 327 m (1,073 ft)
- Highest elevation: 880 m (2,890 ft)
- Lowest elevation: 308 m (1,010 ft)
- Population (2023): 252
  - Density: 34.7/km^{2} (89.9/sq mi)
- Time zone: UTC+01:00 (CET)
  - Summer (DST): UTC+02:00 (CEST)
- INSEE/Postal code: 30016 /30120
- ^{1} French Land Register data, which excludes lakes, ponds, glaciers > 1 km^{2} (0.386 sq mi or 247 acres) and river estuaries.

Arre (French pronunciation: [aʁ]; Occitan: Arre) is a commune in the Gard department in southern France.

== Population ==
Historical population
Year	Pop.	±% p.a.
1968	388	—
1975	315	−2.93%
1982	320	+0.23%
1990	296	−0.97%
1999	283	−0.50%
2007	292	+0.39%
2012	293	+0.07%
2017	287	−0.41%
2023	252	−2.14%
Source: INSEE

== See also ==
- Communes of the Gard department
