= Causse-Bégon =

Commune in Occitanie, France

- Commune
- Coat of arms
- Location of Causse-Bégon
- Location within France Location within Occitanie
- Coordinates: 44°03′46″N 3°21′39″E
- Country: France
- Region: Occitania
- Department: Gard
- Arrondissement: Le Vigan
- Canton: Le Vigan

Government
  - Mayor (2020–2026): Christian Evesque
- Area^{1}: 7.67 km^{2} (2.96 sq mi)
- Elevation: 865 m (2,838 ft)
- Highest elevation: 928 m (3,045 ft)
- Lowest elevation: 513 m (1,683 ft)
- Population (2023): 25
  - Density: 3.3/km^{2} (8.4/sq mi)
- Time zone: UTC+01:00 (CET)
  - Summer (DST): UTC+02:00 (CEST)
- INSEE/Postal code: 30074 /30750
- ^{1} French Land Register data, which excludes lakes, ponds, glaciers > 1 km^{2} (0.386 sq mi or 247 acres) and river estuaries.

Causse-Bégon (French pronunciation: [kos beɡɔ̃]; Occitan: Lo Causse Begon) is a commune in the Gard department in southern France.

== Population ==
Historical population
Year	Pop.	±% p.a.
1968	34	—
1975	32	−0.86%
1982	32	+0.00%
1990	23	−4.04%
1999	23	+0.00%
2007	20	−1.73%
2012	9	−14.76%
2017	20	+17.32%
2023	25	+3.79%
Source: INSEE

== See also ==
- Communes of the Gard department
