= Pommiers, Gard =

Pommiers
- Commune
- Coat of arms
- Location of Pommiers
- Location within France Location within Occitanie
- Coordinates: 43°57′07″N 3°36′30″E
- Country: France
- Region: Occitania
- Department: Gard
- Arrondissement: Le Vigan
- Canton: Le Vigan
- Intercommunality: Pays Viganais

Government
  - Mayor (2021–2026): Denis Toureille
- Area^{1}: 6.51 km^{2} (2.51 sq mi)
- Elevation: 430 m (1,410 ft)
- Highest elevation: 628 m (2,060 ft)
- Lowest elevation: 218 m (715 ft)
- Population (2023): 58
  - Density: 8.9/km^{2} (23/sq mi)
- Time zone: UTC+01:00 (CET)
  - Summer (DST): UTC+02:00 (CEST)
- INSEE/Postal code: 30199 /30120
- ^{1} French Land Register data, which excludes lakes, ponds, glaciers > 1 km^{2} (0.386 sq mi or 247 acres) and river estuaries.

Pommiers (French pronunciation: [pɔmje]; Occitan: Pomièrs) is a commune in the Gard department in southern France.

== Population ==
Historical population
Year	Pop.	±% p.a.
1968	63	—
1975	82	+3.84%
1982	72	−1.84%
1990	61	−2.05%
1999	60	−0.18%
2007	69	+1.76%
2012	61	−2.43%
2017	56	−1.70%
2023	58	+0.59%
Source: INSEE

== See also ==
- Communes of the Gard department
