= Sumène =

- Commune
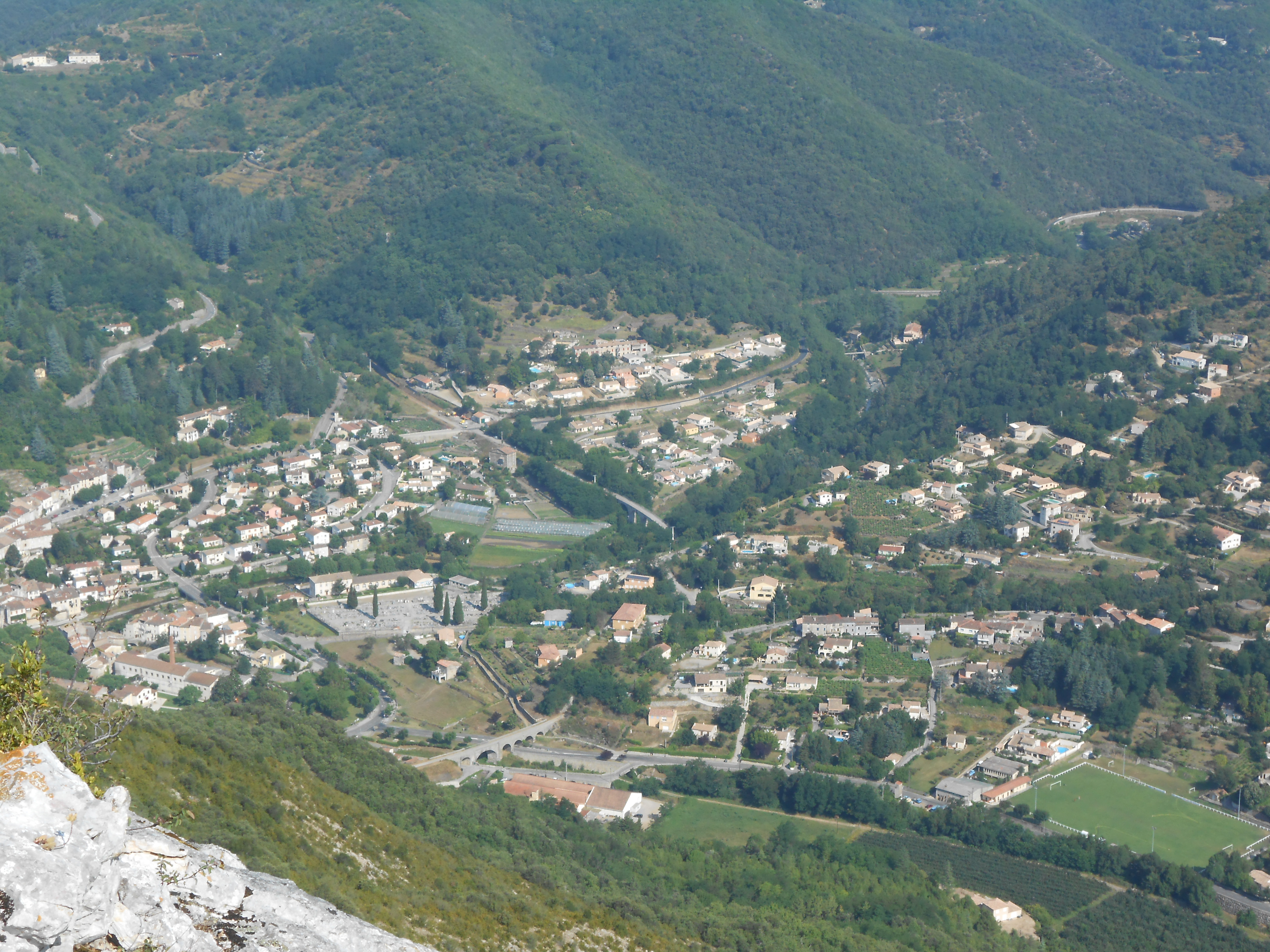
- A general view of Sumène

- Coat of arms
- Location of Sumène
- Location within France Location within Occitanie
- Coordinates: 43°58′55″N 3°42′58″E
- Country: France
- Region: Occitania
- Department: Gard
- Arrondissement: Le Vigan
- Canton: Le Vigan
- Intercommunality: Cévennes Gangeoises et Suménoises

Government
  - Mayor (2020–2026): Ghislain Pallier
- Area^{1}: 36.59 km^{2} (14.13 sq mi)
- Elevation: 205 m (673 ft)
- Highest elevation: 933 m (3,061 ft)
- Lowest elevation: 175 m (574 ft)
- Population (2023): 1,222
  - Density: 33.40/km^{2} (86.50/sq mi)
- Time zone: UTC+01:00 (CET)
  - Summer (DST): UTC+02:00 (CEST)
- INSEE/Postal code: 30325 /30440
- ^{1} French Land Register data, which excludes lakes, ponds, glaciers > 1 km^{2} (0.386 sq mi or 247 acres) and river estuaries.

Sumène (French pronunciation: [symɛn]; Occitan: Sumena) is a commune in the Gard department in southern France.

== Geography ==
=== Climate ===
Sumène has a hot-summer Mediterranean climate (Köppen climate classification Csa) closely bordering on a warm-summer Mediterranean climate (Csb). The average annual temperature in Sumène is 13.4 °C (56.1 °F). The average annual rainfall is 1,245.5 mm (49.04 in) with October as the wettest month. The temperatures are highest on average in July, at around 22.8 °C (73.0 °F), and lowest in January, at around 5.2 °C (41.4 °F). The highest temperature ever recorded in Sumène was 41.0 °C (105.8 °F) on 12 August 2003; the coldest temperature ever recorded was −13.8 °C (7.2 °F) on 15 January 1985.

Climate data for Sumène (1981−2010 normals, extremes 1978−2011)
Month	Jan	Feb	Mar	Apr	May	Jun	Jul	Aug	Sep	Oct	Nov	Dec	Year
Record high °C (°F)	20.0 (68.0)	22.0 (71.6)	29.0 (84.2)	31.2 (88.2)	34.8 (94.6)	37.0 (98.6)	40.8 (105.4)	41.0 (105.8)	38.0 (100.4)	31.0 (87.8)	25.0 (77.0)	20.4 (68.7)	41.0 (105.8)
Mean daily maximum °C (°F)	10.0 (50.0)	11.7 (53.1)	15.8 (60.4)	18.3 (64.9)	22.7 (72.9)	27.2 (81.0)	30.8 (87.4)	30.3 (86.5)	25.4 (77.7)	19.1 (66.4)	13.5 (56.3)	10.1 (50.2)	19.6 (67.3)
Daily mean °C (°F)	5.2 (41.4)	6.1 (43.0)	9.4 (48.9)	11.9 (53.4)	15.9 (60.6)	19.8 (67.6)	22.8 (73.0)	22.4 (72.3)	18.3 (64.9)	13.9 (57.0)	8.8 (47.8)	5.7 (42.3)	13.4 (56.1)
Mean daily minimum °C (°F)	0.4 (32.7)	0.6 (33.1)	3.0 (37.4)	5.6 (42.1)	9.1 (48.4)	12.3 (54.1)	14.7 (58.5)	14.5 (58.1)	11.3 (52.3)	8.7 (47.7)	4.0 (39.2)	1.2 (34.2)	7.2 (45.0)
Record low °C (°F)	−13.8 (7.2)	−13.0 (8.6)	−12.0 (10.4)	−2.5 (27.5)	0.0 (32.0)	4.5 (40.1)	6.7 (44.1)	5.0 (41.0)	3.0 (37.4)	−3.0 (26.6)	−8.5 (16.7)	−9.4 (15.1)	−13.8 (7.2)
Average precipitation mm (inches)	97.5 (3.84)	82.3 (3.24)	65.0 (2.56)	107.9 (4.25)	98.7 (3.89)	64.2 (2.53)	37.8 (1.49)	58.9 (2.32)	150.7 (5.93)	192.2 (7.57)	152.8 (6.02)	137.5 (5.41)	1,245.5 (49.04)
Average precipitation days (≥ 1.0 mm)	7.6	6.6	5.8	7.9	7.9	5.4	3.6	4.9	6.2	9.9	8.4	7.8	82.1
Source: Météo-France

== Population ==
Historical population
Year	Pop.	±% p.a.
1968	1,913	—
1975	1,702	−1.66%
1982	1,613	−0.76%
1990	1,417	−1.61%
1999	1,492	+0.57%
2007	1,526	+0.28%
2012	1,653	+1.61%
2017	1,549	−1.29%
2023	1,222	−3.87%
Source: INSEE

== See also ==
- Communes of the Gard department
