= Canton of Le Vigan =

Coordinates: 43.99°N 3.61°E

The canton of Le Vigan is an administrative division of the Gard department, southern France. Its borders were modified at the French canton reorganisation which came into effect in March 2015. Its seat is in Le Vigan.

It consists of the following communes:

1. Alzon
2. Arphy
3. Arre
4. Arrigas
5. Aulas
6. Aumessas
7. Avèze
8. Bez-et-Esparon
9. Blandas
10. Bréau-Mars
11. La Cadière-et-Cambo
12. Campestre-et-Luc
13. Causse-Bégon
14. Conqueyrac
15. Dourbies
16. L'Estréchure
17. Lanuéjols
18. Lasalle
19. Mandagout
20. Molières-Cavaillac
21. Montdardier
22. Peyrolles
23. Les Plantiers
24. Pommiers
25. Pompignan
26. Revens
27. Rogues
28. Roquedur
29. Saint-André-de-Majencoules
30. Saint-André-de-Valborgne
31. Saint-Bresson
32. Saint-Hippolyte-du-Fort
33. Saint-Julien-de-la-Nef
34. Saint-Laurent-le-Minier
35. Saint-Martial
36. Saint-Roman-de-Codières
37. Saint-Sauveur-Camprieu
38. Saumane
39. Soudorgues
40. Sumène
41. Trèves
42. Val-d'Aigoual
43. Le Vigan
44. Vissec
