= Saint-Bresson, Gard =

Saint-Bresson
- Commune
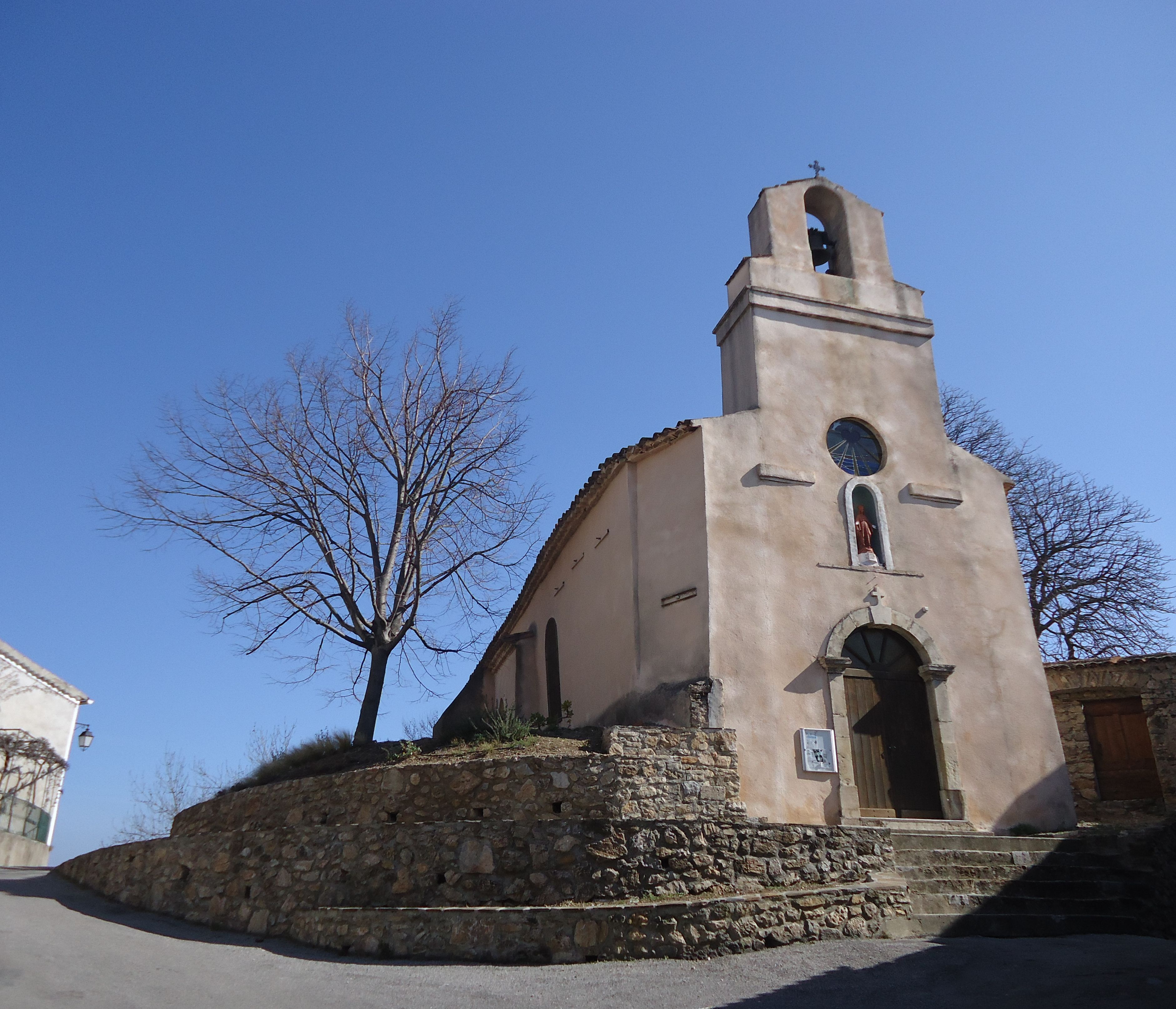
- The church of Saint-Bresson

- Coat of arms
- Location of Saint-Bresson
- Location within France Location within Occitanie
- Coordinates: 43°57′15″N 3°38′48″E
- Country: France
- Region: Occitania
- Department: Gard
- Arrondissement: Le Vigan
- Canton: Le Vigan
- Intercommunality: Pays Viganais

Government
  - Mayor (2020–2026): Patrick Darlot
- Area^{1}: 8.4 km^{2} (3.2 sq mi)
- Elevation: 460 m (1,510 ft)
- Highest elevation: 708 m (2,323 ft)
- Lowest elevation: 229 m (751 ft)
- Population (2023): 73
  - Density: 8.7/km^{2} (23/sq mi)
- Time zone: UTC+01:00 (CET)
  - Summer (DST): UTC+02:00 (CEST)
- INSEE/Postal code: 30238 /30440
- ^{1} French Land Register data, which excludes lakes, ponds, glaciers > 1 km^{2} (0.386 sq mi or 247 acres) and river estuaries.

Saint-Bresson (French pronunciation: [sɛ̃ bʁɛsɔ̃]; Occitan: Sent Breçon) is a commune in the Gard department in the Occitanie region in southern France.

== Population ==
Historical population
| Year | Pop. | ±% p.a. |
|---|---|---|
| 1968 | 73 | — |
| 1975 | 69 | −0.80% |
| 1982 | 53 | −3.70% |
| 1990 | 48 | −1.23% |
| 1999 | 52 | +0.89% |
| 2007 | 71 | +3.97% |
| 2012 | 53 | −5.68% |
| 2017 | 54 | +0.37% |
| 2023 | 73 | +5.15% |
Source: INSEE

== See also ==
- Communes of the Gard department
