= Peyrolles-en-Cévennes =

- Commune
- Coat of arms
- Location of Peyrolles-en-Cévennes
- Location within France Location within Occitanie
- Coordinates: 44°06′42″N 3°50′00″E
- Country: France
- Region: Occitania
- Department: Gard
- Arrondissement: Le Vigan
- Canton: Le Vigan
- Intercommunality: Causses Aigoual Cévennes

Government
  - Mayor (2020–2026): François Abbou
- Area^{1}: 8.29 km^{2} (3.20 sq mi)
- Highest elevation: 804 m (2,638 ft)
- Lowest elevation: 228 m (748 ft)
- Population (2023): 30
  - Density: 3.6/km^{2} (9.4/sq mi)
- Time zone: UTC+01:00 (CET)
  - Summer (DST): UTC+02:00 (CEST)
- INSEE/Postal code: 30195 /30124
- ^{1} French Land Register data, which excludes lakes, ponds, glaciers > 1 km^{2} (0.386 sq mi or 247 acres) and river estuaries.

Peyrolles-en-Cévennes (before 2025: Peyrolles, French: [peʁɔl]; Occitan: Peiròlas) is a commune in the Gard department in southern France.

On 7 July 2006 the name of the commune was officially changed from Peyroles to Peyrolles.

== Population ==
Historical population
Year	Pop.	±% p.a.
1968	36	—
1975	38	+0.78%
1982	31	−2.87%
1990	28	−1.26%
1999	37	+3.15%
2007	41	+1.29%
2012	41	+0.00%
2017	33	−4.25%
2023	30	−1.58%
Source: INSEE

== See also ==
- Communes of the Gard department
