= Vis (river) =

River in southern France

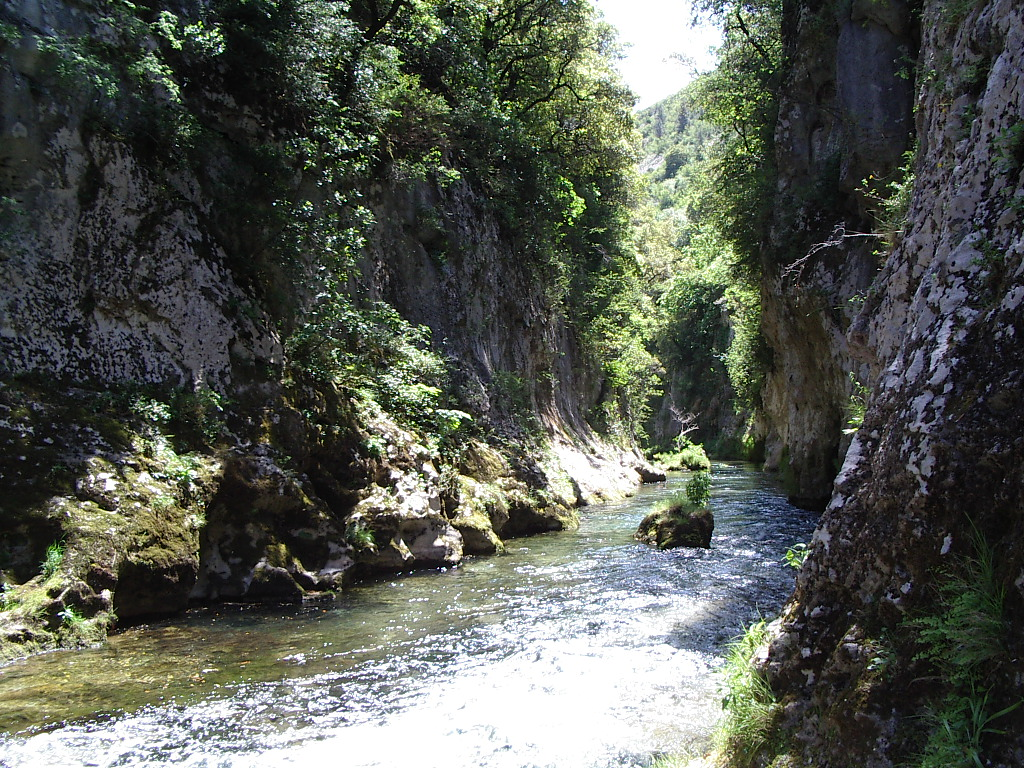
- The Vis

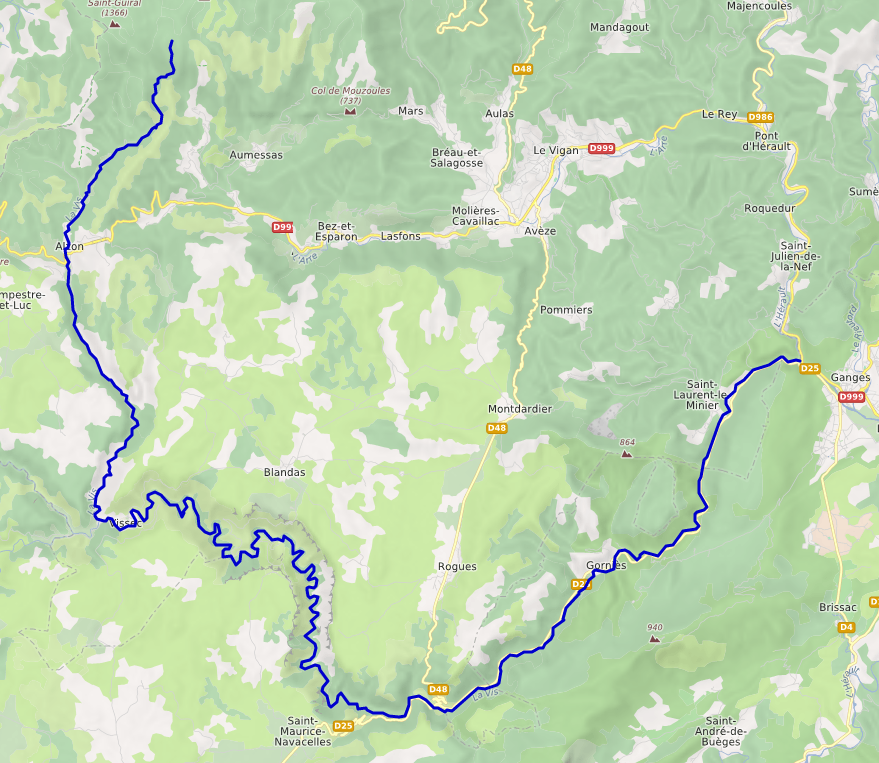
- Native name: La Vis (French)

Location
- Country: France

Physical characteristics
- Source
  - location: Cévennes
- Mouth
  - location: Hérault
  - coordinates: 43°56′22″N 3°41′23″E
- Length: 57.8 km (35.9 mi)
- Basin size: 332 km^{2} (128 mi^{2})
- Discharge
  - average: 10 m^{3}/s (350 cu ft/s)

Basin features
- Progression: Hérault→ Mediterranean Sea

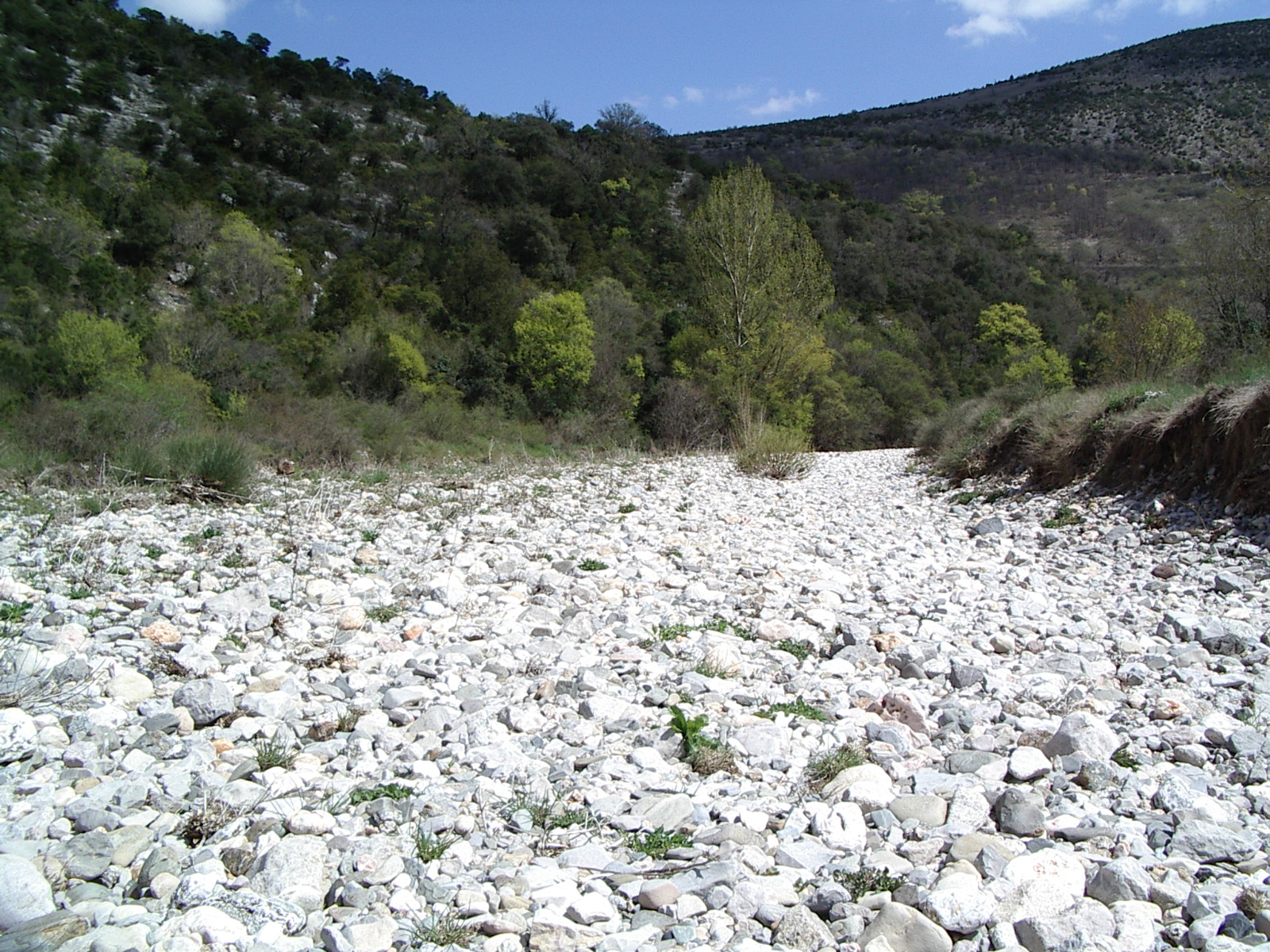
Vis sec

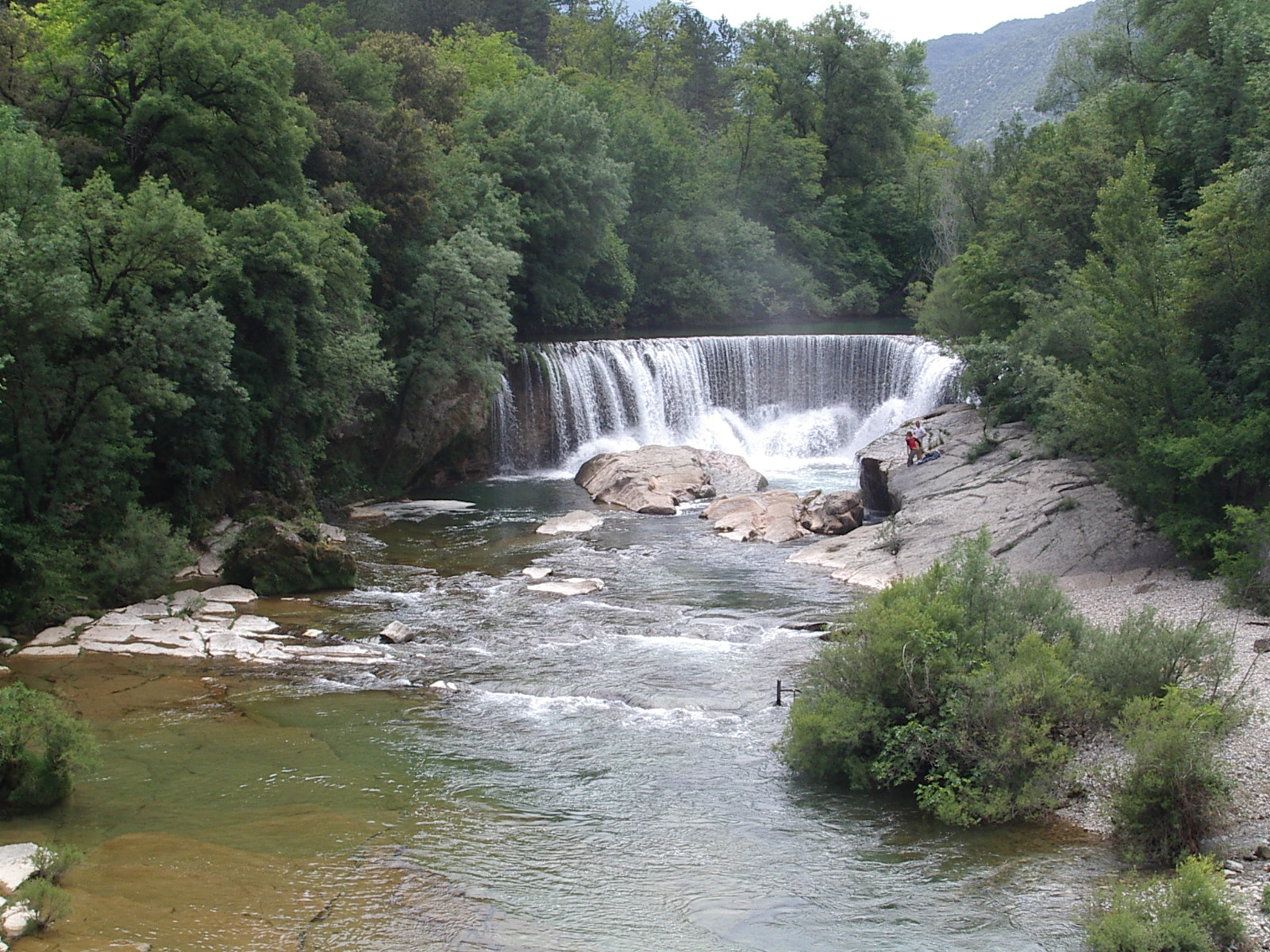
St Laurent le Minier

The Vis is a 57.8-kilometre-long (35.9 mi) river in south-central France, in the Occitanie administrative region. It is a right tributary of the Hérault. Its source is in the Cévennes, near the village of Alzon. It flows between the Causse du Larzac and the Causse de Blandas into the Hérault and Gard departments. The Vis flows into the Hérault near Ganges.

== Origin of the name ==
The name "Vis" derives from the old Proto-Indo-European root "Vir" which means "river", and which can be found in the name of many rivers in France such as the Vire.

== Towns along the river ==
The Vis flows through the following communes from source to mouth:

- Arrigas
- Alzon
- Campestre-et-Luc
- Blandas
- Vissec
- Saint-Maurice-Navacelles
- Rogues
- Gorniès
- Saint-Laurent-le-Minier
- Saint-Julien-de-la-Nef
- Cazilhac

== Hydrology and water quality ==
The Vis takes its source on the Saint-Guiral mount.

== See also ==
- Cirque de Navacelles
