= Causse de Blandas =

Coordinates: 43°54′57″N 3°30′48″E

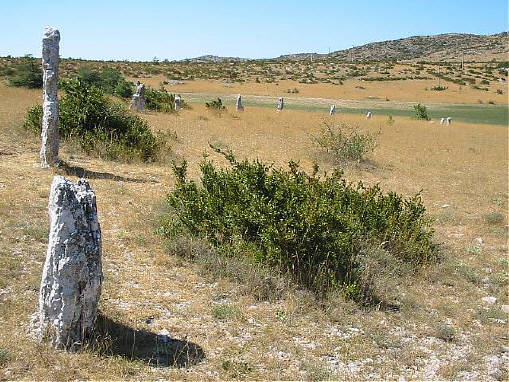
Landscape of Causse de Blandas

Causse de Blandas is a limestone karst plateau in the south of the Massif Central in the Gard department, in southern France.

== Geography ==
The communes of Causse de Blandas are:

- Blandas
- Montdardier
- Rogues

Comunes partially located on the causse:

- Alzon
- Arre
- Gorniès
- Saint-Laurent-le-Minier
- Vissec

== See also ==
- Causses
- Cirque de Navacelles
- Vis river
