= J.D.T. de Bienville =

French physician

J.D.T. de Bienville (1726 in Cevennes – August 3, 1813, in Paris) whose real name was Jean Baptiste Louis de Thesacq, was a French medical doctor of the 18th century. He practiced in France, notably in the vicinity of Tours in 1761 and in the Dutch Republic, notably in The Hague and Rotterdam. He is the author of various medical treatises. One of his works, La Nymphomanie, published in 1771 and which poses as the counterpart to the famous treatise on onanism by Samuel-Auguste Tissot, met with a certain success, as evidenced by the numerous reissues and translations of which he has is about.

== Works ==
- La Nymphomanie, ou Traité de la fureur utérine, Amsterdam, Marc-Michel Rey, 1771
- Recherches théoriques et pratiques sur la petite vérole, Amsterdam, Barthelemi Vlam
- Traité des erreurs populaires sur la santé, La Haye, Pierre-Frédéric Gosse, 1775
- Réflexions importantes sur les abus de la saignée, Amsterdam, J.-F. Rosart, 1781
- Le Pour et le Contre de l'inoculation de la petite vérole, Rotterdam, s.n., s.d.
