= Château de Saint-Maurice =

Château in Hérault, France

Coordinates: 43°50′50″N 3°31′5″E

The Château de Saint-Maurice is built on the remains of an earlier 13th castle in the commune of Saint-Maurice-Navacelles in the Hérault département of France.

The first castle at Saint-Maurice was mentioned in 1280; the only remains are the base of its square keep and parts of the substructure from the 14th century. The present château was built in the 16th century on the site of the old castle. In 1753, it belonged to Antoine de Barbeira who became marquis of Saint-Maurice that year. The structure was heavily transformed in the 19th century.

Private property, it is on the inventory of monument historiques of the French Ministry of Culture.

== See also ==
- List of castles in France
