= Alzon =

Commune in Occitanie, France

- Commune
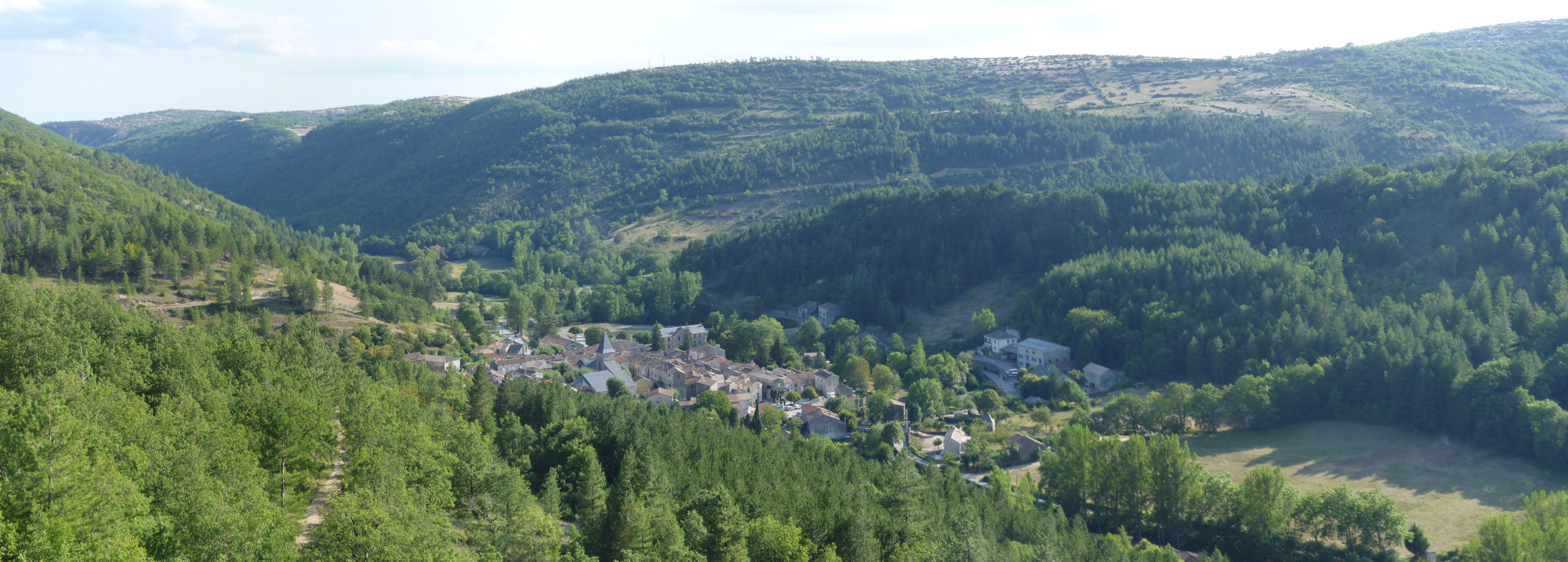
- A general view of Alzon

- Coat of arms
- Location of Alzon
- Location within France Location within Occitanie
- Coordinates: 43°58′04″N 3°26′25″E
- Country: France
- Region: Occitania
- Department: Gard
- Arrondissement: Le Vigan
- Canton: Le Vigan
- Intercommunality: Pays Viganais

Government
  - Mayor (2020–2026): Roger Laurens
- Area^{1}: 27.48 km^{2} (10.61 sq mi)
- Elevation: 600 m (2,000 ft)
- Highest elevation: 1,414 m (4,639 ft)
- Lowest elevation: 502 m (1,647 ft)
- Population (2023): 194
  - Density: 7.06/km^{2} (18.3/sq mi)
- Time zone: UTC+01:00 (CET)
  - Summer (DST): UTC+02:00 (CEST)
- INSEE/Postal code: 30009 /30770
- ^{1} French Land Register data, which excludes lakes, ponds, glaciers > 1 km^{2} (0.386 sq mi or 247 acres) and river estuaries.

Alzon (French pronunciation: [alzɔ̃]) is a commune in the Gard department in southern France.

The commune is located in the south of the Cévennes National Park, in the upper Vis river valley.

== Geography ==
=== Climate ===
Alzon has an oceanic climate (Köppen climate classification Cfb) closely bordering on a warm-summer Mediterranean climate (Csb). The average annual temperature in Alzon is 11.5 °C (52.7 °F). The average annual rainfall is 1,372.8 mm (54.05 in) with November as the wettest month. The temperatures are highest on average in July, at around 20.1 °C (68.2 °F), and lowest in January, at around 4.0 °C (39.2 °F). The highest temperature ever recorded in Alzon was 39.3 °C (102.7 °F) on 28 June 2019; the coldest temperature ever recorded was −13.4 °C (7.9 °F) on 1 March 2005.

Climate data for Alzon (1991−2020 normals, extremes 1998−present)
Month	Jan	Feb	Mar	Apr	May	Jun	Jul	Aug	Sep	Oct	Nov	Dec	Year
Record high °C (°F)	21.2 (70.2)	23.4 (74.1)	25.5 (77.9)	29.0 (84.2)	32.9 (91.2)	39.3 (102.7)	37.2 (99.0)	39.2 (102.6)	32.3 (90.1)	29.2 (84.6)	24.4 (75.9)	21.2 (70.2)	39.3 (102.7)
Mean daily maximum °C (°F)	7.9 (46.2)	9.0 (48.2)	12.7 (54.9)	15.8 (60.4)	19.8 (67.6)	24.7 (76.5)	27.3 (81.1)	27.1 (80.8)	22.5 (72.5)	17.2 (63.0)	11.5 (52.7)	8.3 (46.9)	17.0 (62.6)
Daily mean °C (°F)	4.0 (39.2)	4.3 (39.7)	7.3 (45.1)	10.2 (50.4)	13.8 (56.8)	17.8 (64.0)	20.1 (68.2)	19.8 (67.6)	16.0 (60.8)	12.5 (54.5)	7.5 (45.5)	4.5 (40.1)	11.5 (52.7)
Mean daily minimum °C (°F)	0.2 (32.4)	−0.3 (31.5)	2.0 (35.6)	4.6 (40.3)	7.7 (45.9)	10.9 (51.6)	12.9 (55.2)	12.5 (54.5)	9.5 (49.1)	7.7 (45.9)	3.5 (38.3)	0.6 (33.1)	6.0 (42.8)
Record low °C (°F)	−12.2 (10.0)	−13.1 (8.4)	−13.4 (7.9)	−6.0 (21.2)	−2.4 (27.7)	1.4 (34.5)	3.0 (37.4)	3.8 (38.8)	−0.7 (30.7)	−4.6 (23.7)	−9.9 (14.2)	−12.8 (9.0)	−13.4 (7.9)
Average precipitation mm (inches)	129.4 (5.09)	84.3 (3.32)	101.7 (4.00)	132.2 (5.20)	102.0 (4.02)	68.7 (2.70)	38.3 (1.51)	61.1 (2.41)	131.2 (5.17)	188.9 (7.44)	195.5 (7.70)	139.5 (5.49)	1,372.8 (54.05)
Average precipitation days (≥ 1.0 mm)	11.3	8.8	9.7	10.7	9.2	6.6	5.0	5.8	6.7	11.7	11.6	11.8	108.8
Source: Météo-France

== Population ==
Historical population
Year	Pop.	±% p.a.
1968	280	—
1975	237	−2.35%
1982	201	−2.33%
1990	183	−1.17%
1999	208	+1.43%
2007	222	+0.82%
2012	204	−1.68%
2017	177	−2.80%
2023	194	+1.54%
Source: INSEE

== Sights ==
- Arboretum de Cazebonne

== See also ==
- Communes of the Gard department
- Waitangi, Chatham Islands, the antipode of Alzon
