= Saint-Maurice-Navacelles =

- Commune
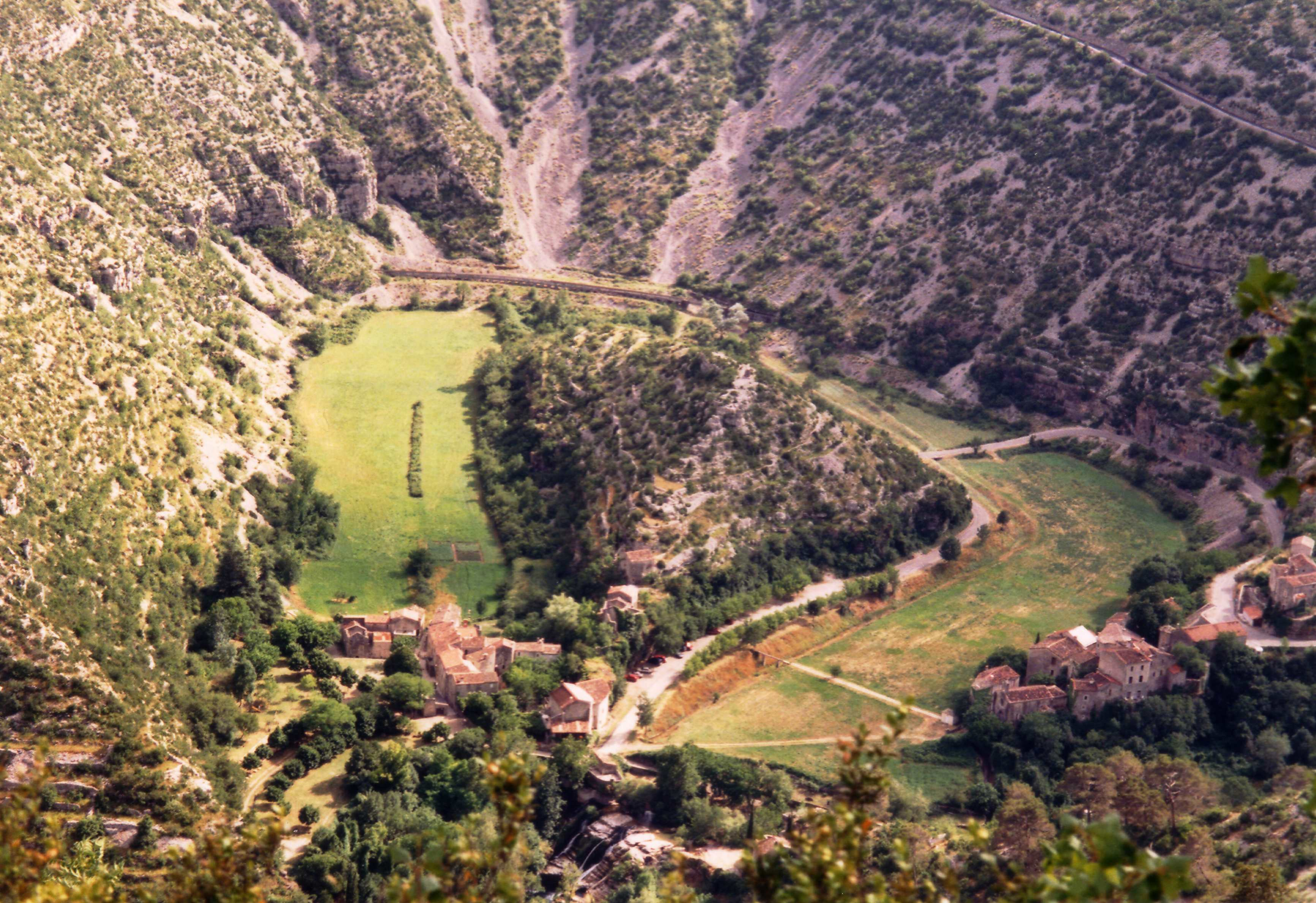
- Cirque de Navacelles

- Coat of arms
- Location of Saint-Maurice-Navacelles
- Location within France Location within Occitanie
- Coordinates: 43°50′52″N 3°31′09″E
- Country: France
- Region: Occitania
- Department: Hérault
- Arrondissement: Lodève
- Canton: Lodève
- Intercommunality: Lodévois-Larzac

Government
  - Mayor (2020–2026): Clément Thery
- Area^{1}: 68.6 km^{2} (26.5 sq mi)
- Elevation: 584 m (1,916 ft)
- Highest elevation: 800 m (2,600 ft)
- Lowest elevation: 219 m (719 ft)
- Population (2023): 185
  - Density: 2.70/km^{2} (6.98/sq mi)
- Time zone: UTC+01:00 (CET)
  - Summer (DST): UTC+02:00 (CEST)
- INSEE/Postal code: 34277 /34520
- ^{1} French Land Register data, which excludes lakes, ponds, glaciers > 1 km^{2} (0.386 sq mi or 247 acres) and river estuaries.

Saint-Maurice-Navacelles (French: [sɛ̃ mɔʁis navasɛl]; Languedocien: Sant Maurise de Navacèlas) is a commune in the Hérault department in the Occitanie region in southern France.

== Population ==
Historical population
Year	Pop.	±% p.a.
1968	104	—
1975	96	−1.14%
1982	97	+0.15%
1990	119	+2.59%
1999	142	+1.98%
2007	158	+1.34%
2012	165	+0.87%
2017	183	+2.09%
2023	185	+0.18%
Source: INSEE

== See also ==
- Communes of the Hérault department
- Cirque de Navacelles
- Vis (river)
- Château de Saint-Maurice
