= Blandas =

Commune in Occitanie, France

- Commune
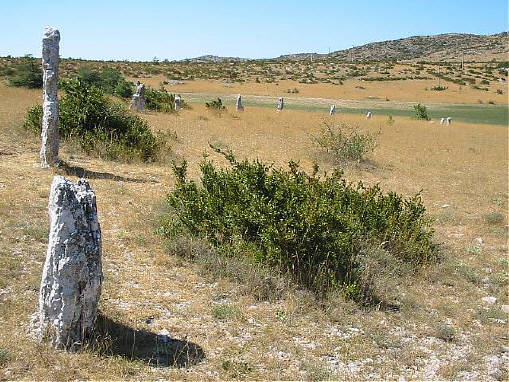
- Part of the Rigalderie stone circle in Blandas

- Coat of arms
- Location of Blandas
- Location within France Location within Occitanie
- Coordinates: 43°54′49″N 3°30′49″E
- Country: France
- Region: Occitania
- Department: Gard
- Arrondissement: Le Vigan
- Canton: Le Vigan
- Intercommunality: Pays Viganais

Government
  - Mayor (2020–2026): Marc Weller
- Area^{1}: 37.46 km^{2} (14.46 sq mi)
- Elevation: 650 m (2,130 ft)
- Highest elevation: 953 m (3,127 ft)
- Lowest elevation: 280 m (920 ft)
- Population (2023): 143
  - Density: 3.82/km^{2} (9.89/sq mi)
- Time zone: UTC+01:00 (CET)
  - Summer (DST): UTC+02:00 (CEST)
- INSEE/Postal code: 30040 /30770
- ^{1} French Land Register data, which excludes lakes, ponds, glaciers > 1 km^{2} (0.386 sq mi or 247 acres) and river estuaries.

Blandas is a commune in the Gard department in southern France. It is known for its proximity to the Cirque de Navacelles and the town encompasses one of the principal overlooks on the Cirque. It is also known for its exceptional megalithic sites. It is included in the UNESCO world heritage site "The Causses and the Cévennes, Mediterranean agro-pastoral Cultural Landscape"

== Population ==
Historical population
Year	Pop.	±% p.a.
1968	141	—
1975	115	−2.87%
1982	116	+0.12%
1990	112	−0.44%
1999	106	−0.61%
2007	126	+2.18%
2012	134	+1.24%
2017	135	+0.15%
2023	143	+0.96%
Source: INSEE

== History ==
=== Prehistoric Finds ===
La grotte des Pins

In May 1967 a team of speleologists attempted to enlarge a natural opening exposed by erosion. Their work exposed a large hidden room 5m high and on the floor of the room they found fragments of ceramics. Further exploration uncovered tools, objects, and much scattered charcoal, up to 60 cm thick in places possibly from prehistoric torches. Theories at the time suggested that the cave served as a cellar or storage, rather than a habitation, since a lack of air circulation made hearth fires difficult.

Baume du Roc du Midi

In 1979 at Baume du Roc du Midi, a cave which opens out from the cliff on the edge of the causse de Blandas at a lookout with a view over the Cirque de Navacelles, archeologists discovered a walled part of the cave, closed since the Middle Ages, but inhabited continuously from prehistory into protohistoric times. Inside the walled portion, many objects including two copper daggers with serrated blades, a bronze axe, a riveted bronze dagger, bronze sconces, spear-tips, and many other Bronze Age objects

La Baumelle

A discovery was made in 2009 by speleologists in a prehistoric cave which had been blocked for over 5000 years. On August 10, 2009, speleologists, along with Laurent Bruxelles and Philippe Galant, from Institut national de Recherches archéologiques préventives, began a 10-day exploration of the find. The entrance was blocked by a menhir or stele. This sandstone monolith with engraved surface had been moved from a deposit found at Montdardier 5–6 km from the cave. Prehistoric remains were discovered: skulls, some covered in calcite, pieces of water-collecting vessels, ceramic shards, and a furnished hallway.

=== Megaliths ===
see also Mégalithes du causse de Blandas (fr)

Monument	Town	Note	Protection	Coordinates	Photo
Cromlech de Lacam de Peyrarines	Blandas	A prehistoric cromlech of 120m in diameter, including 50 standing stones of up to 1.8m high with a standing center menhir. Considered by many to be among the most impressive in Europe.		43.9261°N 3.5306°E	
Cromlech de Lacam de la Rigalderie	Blandas	A cromlech of approximately 90m in diameter with 36 stones, 20 of which are still upright, but lacking a central pillar. One menhir stands 2.5m high		43.9272°N 3.4914°E	
Cromlech de Lacam de Rogues	Blandas			43.8942°N 3.5638°E	
Dolmen d'Arques	Blandas			43.9377°N 3.5032°E	
Dolmen de Barral	Blandas			43.9127°N 3.5541°E	
Dolmen de la Borie d'Arre	Blandas			43.8936°N 3.5367°E	
Dolmen de Planas	Blandas			43.9282°N 3.5366°E	
Dolmen de Regos	Blandas			43.9207°N 3.5427°E	
Dolmen du Château d'Assas	Blandas			43.9115°N 3.5374°E	
Menhir d'Avernat	Blandas			43.9357°N 3.4934°E	
Menhir des Combes	Blandas			43.9359°N 3.4958°E	
Menhir de Planas	Blandas	other name Menhir du Serre de la Gleisa		43.9266°N 3.5391°E	
Menhir du Sotch des Genièvres	Blandas			43.9262°N 3.5215°E	
Menhirs de Landre	Blandas	3 menhirs		43.9365°N 3.5162°E	
Menhirs du Travers des Noyers	Blandas	2 menhirs		43.9006°N 3.5207°E	

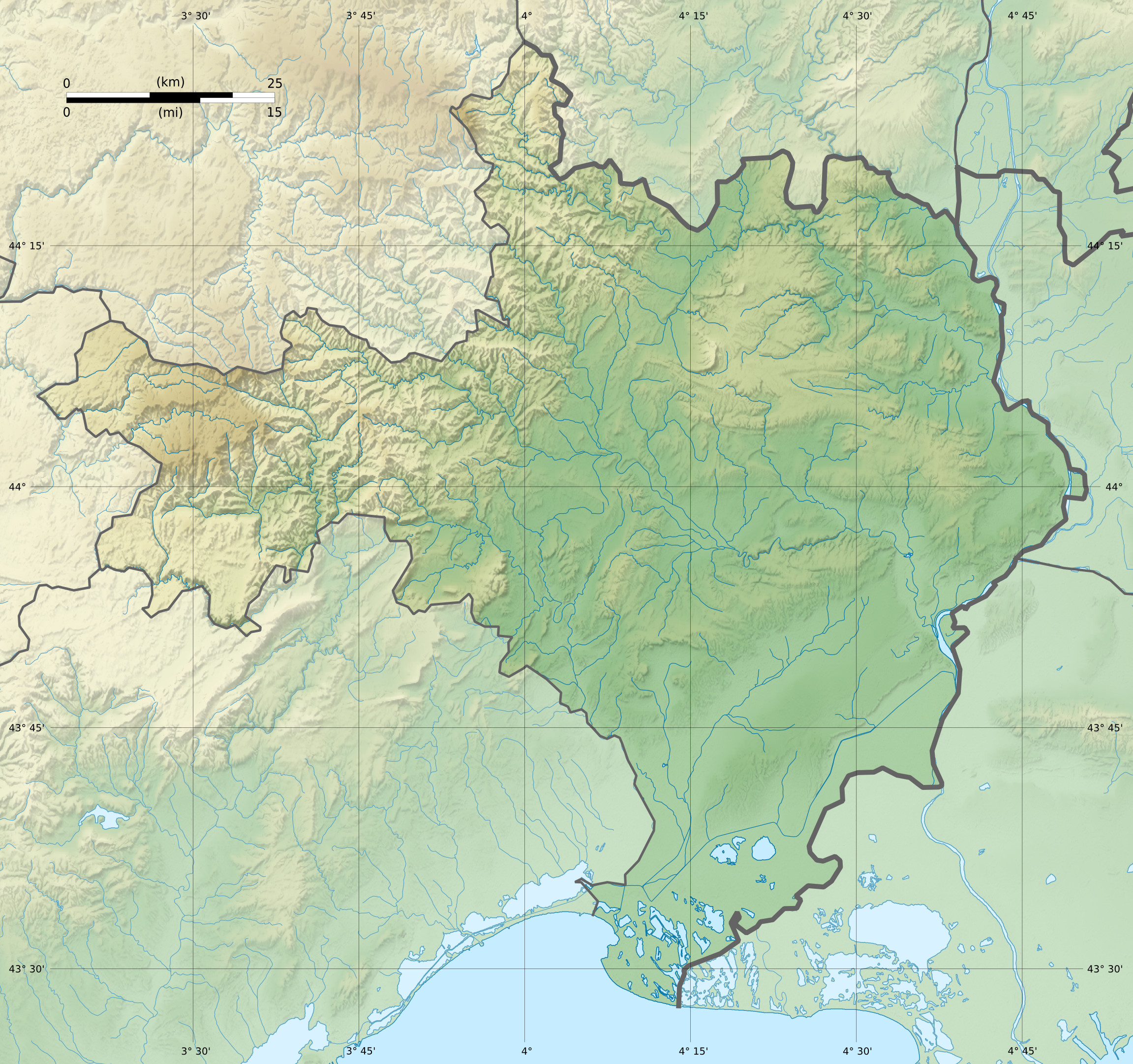
map of Megaliths in Blandas (Gard), France

== See also ==
- Communes of the Gard department
- Causse de Blandas
- Cirque de Navacelles
