= Causses =

UNESCO World Heritage Site
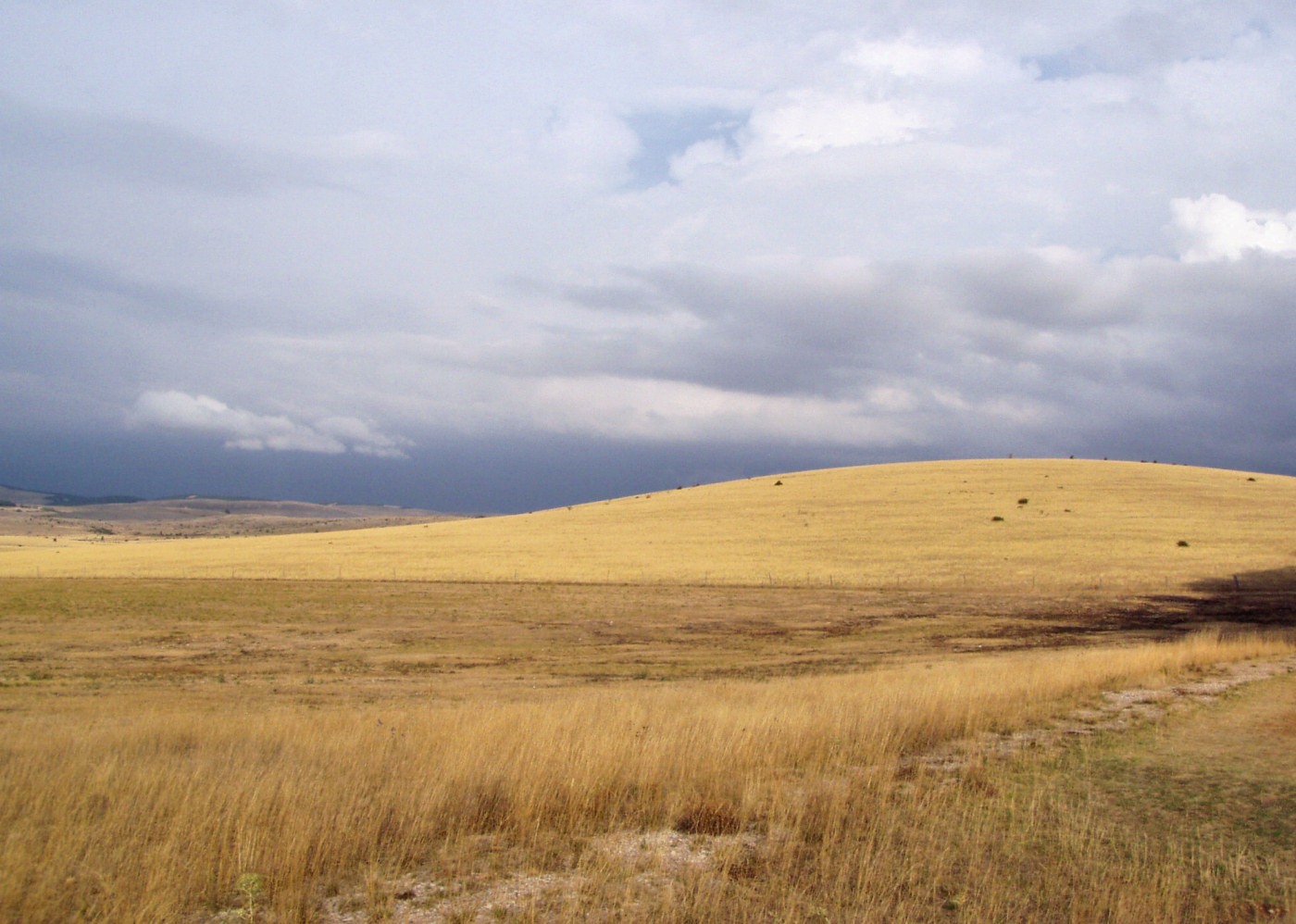
- Causse Méjean in Massif Central, Cévennes National Park, France

- Location within France
- Location: Massif Central, France
- Part of: The Causses and the Cévennes, Mediterranean agro-pastoral Cultural Landscape
- Criteria: Cultural: (iii)(v)
- Reference: 1153rev
- Inscription: 2011 (35th Session)
- Coordinates: 44°9′N 3°15′E

The Causses (French pronunciation: [kos]) are a group of limestone plateaux (700–1,200 m) in the Massif Central. They are bordered to the north-west by the Limousin and the Périgord uplands, and to the east by the Aubrac and the Cévennes. Large river gorges cut through the plateaux, such as the Tarn, Dourbie, Jonte, Lot, Vis, and Aveyron. Causse is an Occitan word meaning "limestone plateau" coming from the latin word calx meaning limestone or chalk.

The Causses and the Cévennes, Mediterranean agro-pastoral Cultural Landscape was added to the UNESCO World Heritage list in 2011, because of the region's extensive and continuous use of Mediterranean pastoral systems and their testimony to the traditional methods of transhumance.

Since at least the Bronze Age, the Causses were used for sheep and cattle droving, and in the Middle Ages, religious orders established in the area, building irrigation and road networks that are still used by farmers today. Characteristics of the region are large farm complexes made out of limestone and long, low stone buildings (often more than 10 meters in length) called les Jasses which are used to house sheep in the winter.

Arranged from the north-west to the south-east, the following plateaus are found:

- the Causses du Quercy
  - the Causse de Martel (Lot)
  - the Causse de Gramat (Lot)
  - the Causse de Limogne (Lot)
  - the Causse corrèzien (Corrèze)
- the Grands Causses:
  - the Causse du Comtal (Aveyron)
  - the Causse de Sévérac (Aveyron)
  - the Causse de Sauveterre (Lozère)
  - the Causse Méjean (Lozère)
  - the Causse Noir (Aveyron)
  - the Causse Rouge (Aveyron)
  - the Causse du Larzac (Aveyron and Hérault)
- notable smaller causses (“petits causses”) nearby
  - Causse de Mende
  - Causse de Blandas
  - Causse de Changefège
  - Causse-Bégon
  - Causse de Campestre
  - Causse d'Aumelas
  - Causse de la Selle

Many sites on the Causses are included in Natura 2000, notably the Parc Naturel Régional des Grands Causses on the Larzac, causse Méjean, and Causse Noir plateaux.

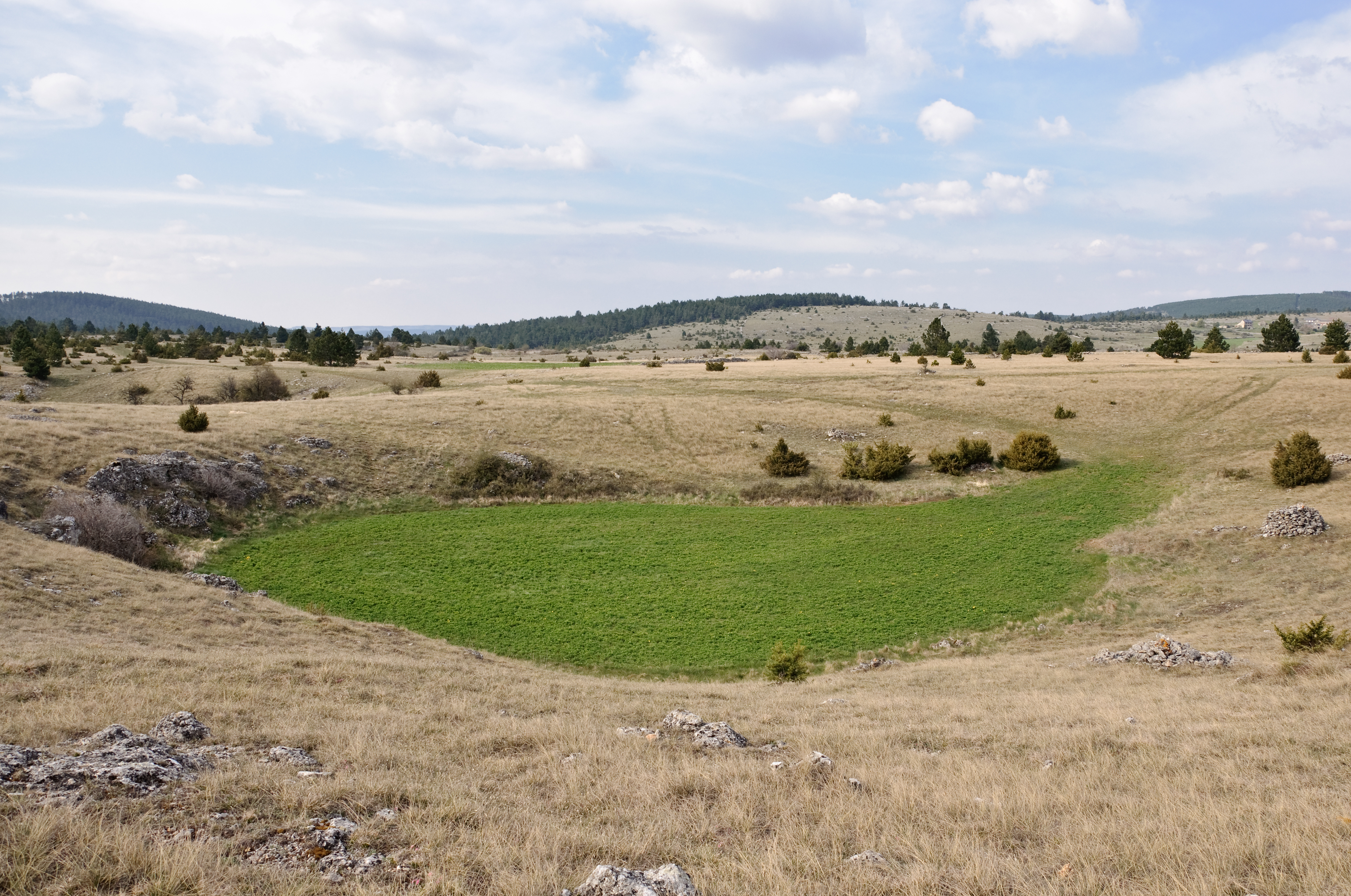
A doline in the causse de Sauveterre, Lozère.

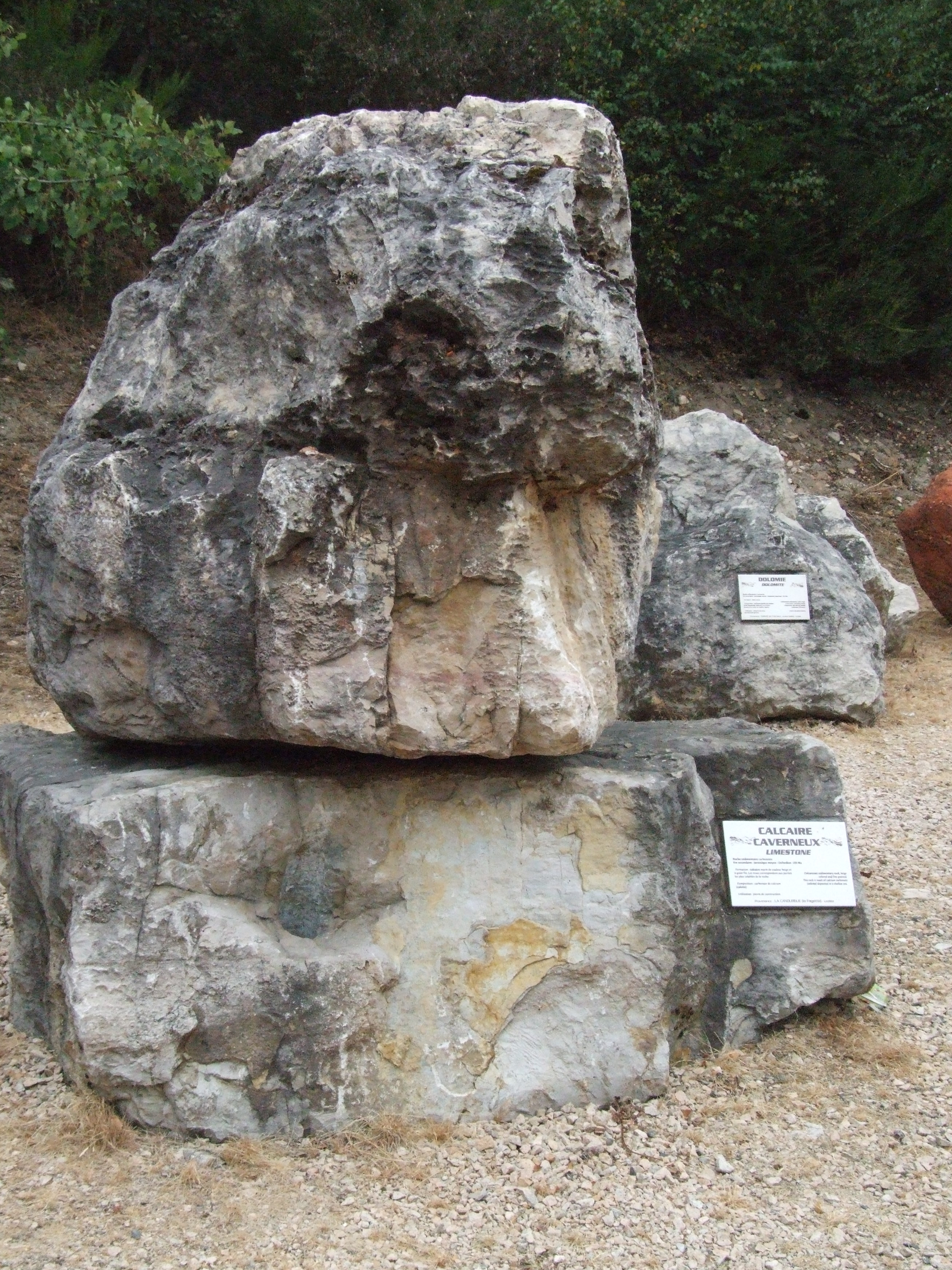
Beige Limestone from the Causse in Lozère.

== Related articles ==
- Flora of the Massif Central
