= Arboretum de Cazebonne =

Arboretum in Languedoc-Roussillon, France

Coordinates: 43.97°N 3.44°E

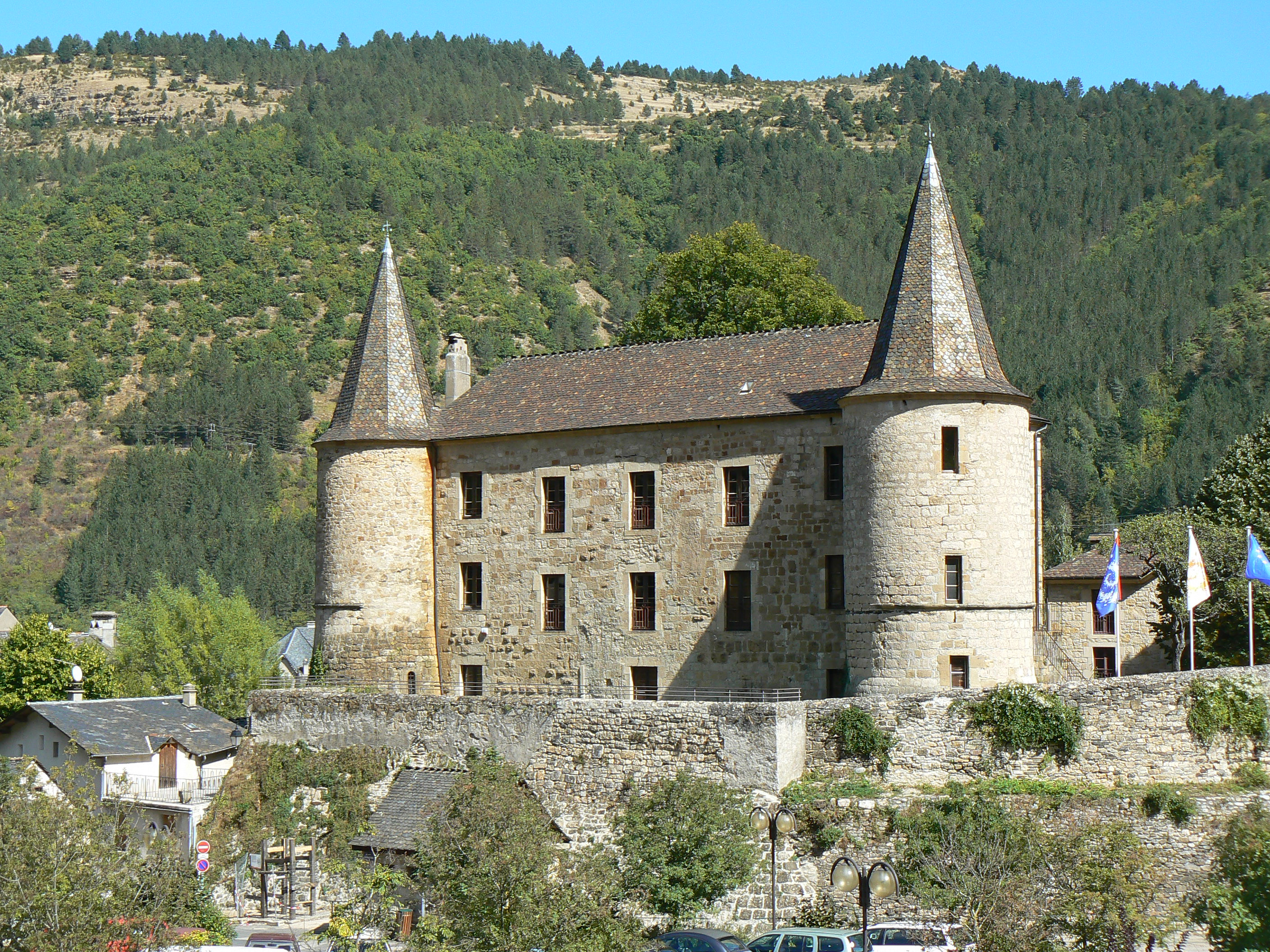

The Arboretum de Cazebonne (4 hectares) is an arboretum located about 4 km from Alzon, on D 231 towards Villaret, Gard, Languedoc-Roussillon, France. It is located within the Cévennes National Park, managed by the Office National des Forêts, and open daily without charge.

The arboretum was created in 1903 by Charles Henri Marie Flahault (1852–1935) and Georges Fabre, near the former village of Cazebonne, as an experimental station for testing introduction of exotic trees. It contains hiking paths and mature, labeled trees including Araucaria and Sequoiadendron giganteum.

== See also ==
- List of botanical gardens in France
