= Cirque de Navacelles =

Erosional landform in France

Coordinates: 43°53′34″N 3°30′36″E

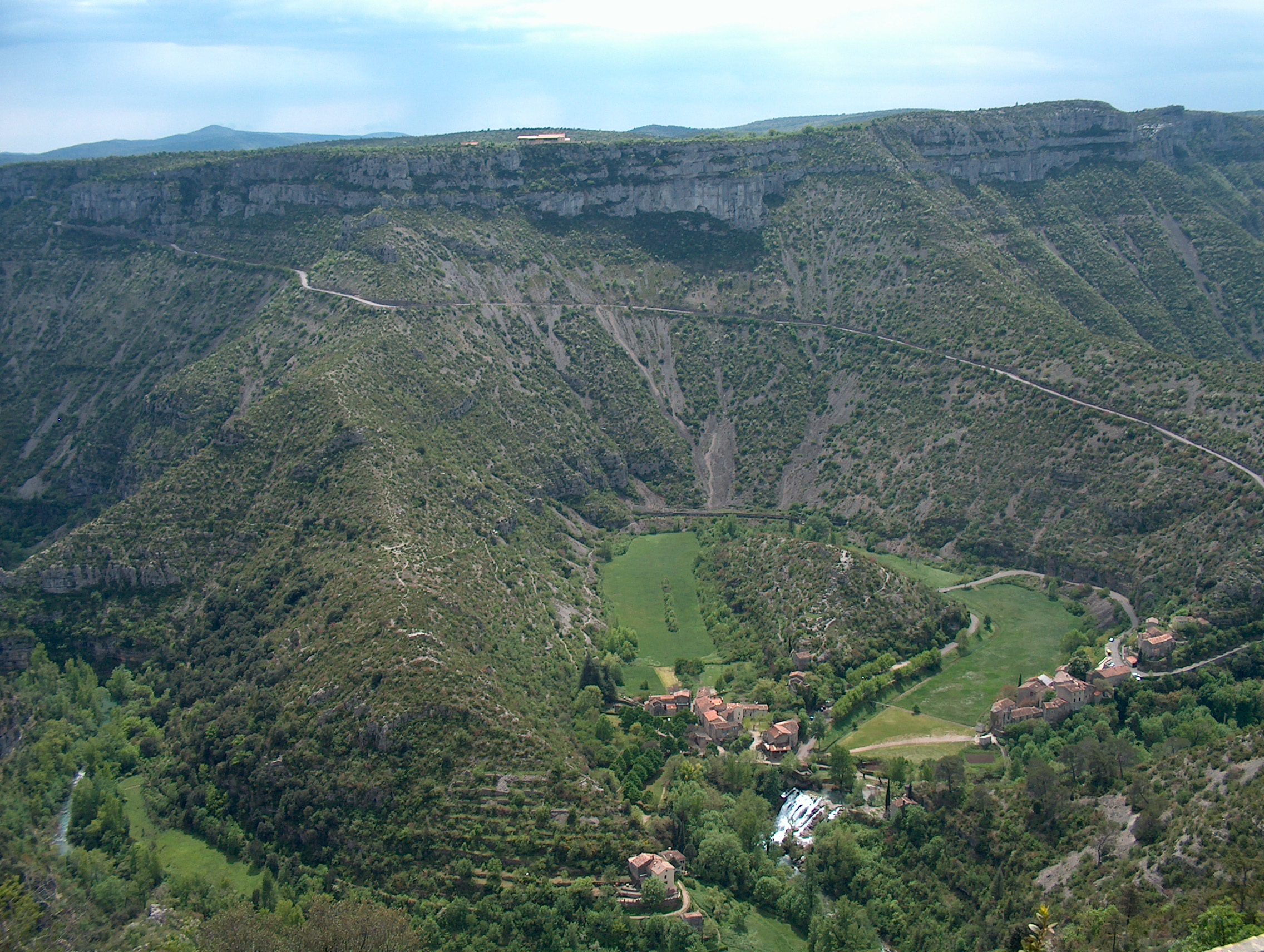
This shows the former oxbow lake in the bottom right of the photo, just near a small settlement. Above them, the road mentioned below can be seen.

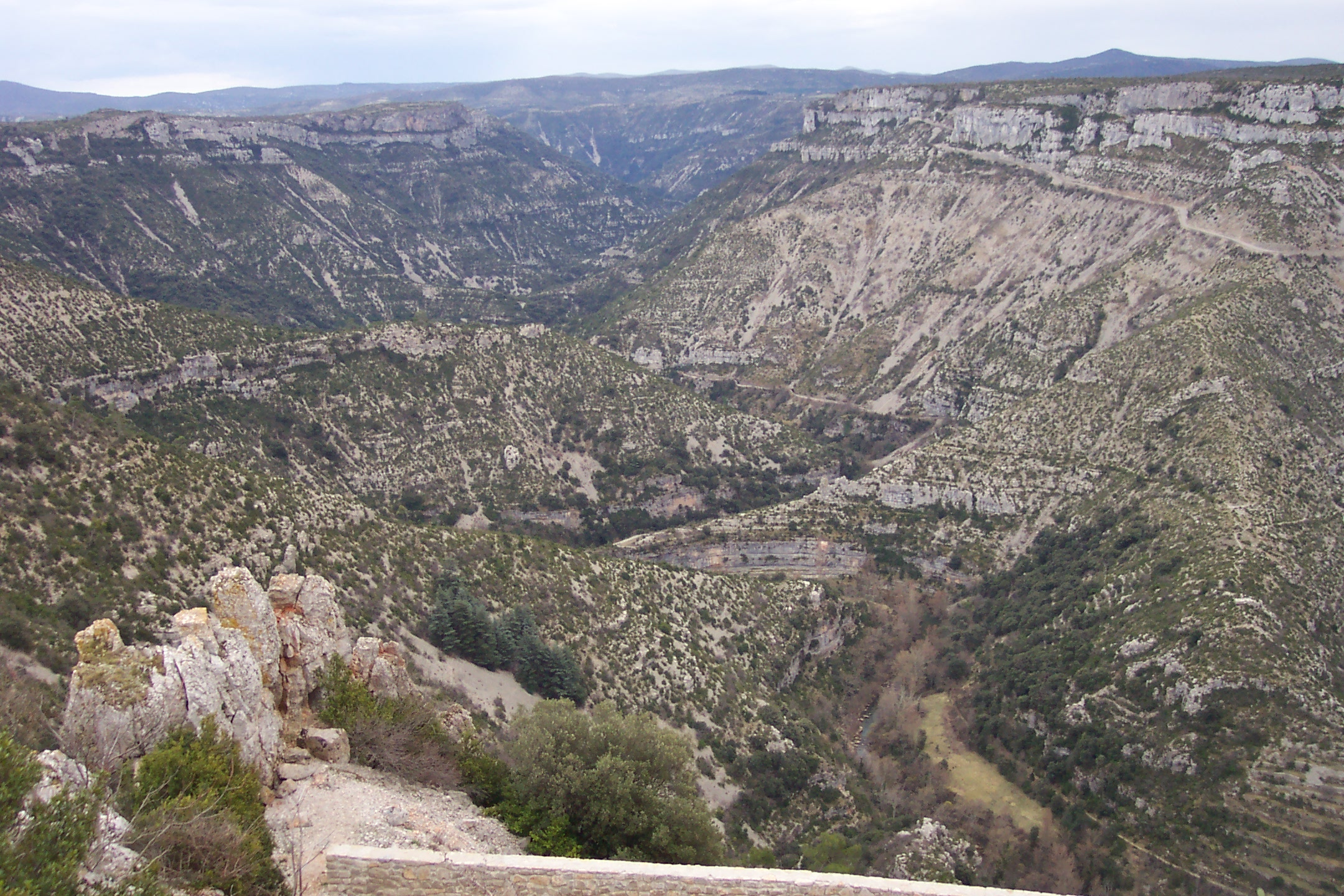
Here the magnificence of the valley is shown. The river's meandering erosion is clear.

The Cirque de Navacelles is large erosional landform, an incised meander, located towards the southern edge of the Massif Central mountain range in France. It is located near Saint-Maurice-Navacelles and Blandas between the Hérault department and the Gard department.

The cirque is isolated, with only a few small villages in the surrounding area. However, with the completion of the Millau Viaduct in 2004 and the A75 motorway between Clermont-Ferrand and Pézenas, tourism in the region has increased.

== Fluvial processes in the cirque ==
The area is an example of a dissected plateau in which the Vis River eroded a deep channel through the base of the valley, creating an incised meander which eventually eroded through creating a cut-off at the neck of the loop. This left an oxbow lake which later dried up, leaving deposits of silt and peat. This created what is the only patch of arable land for many miles around.

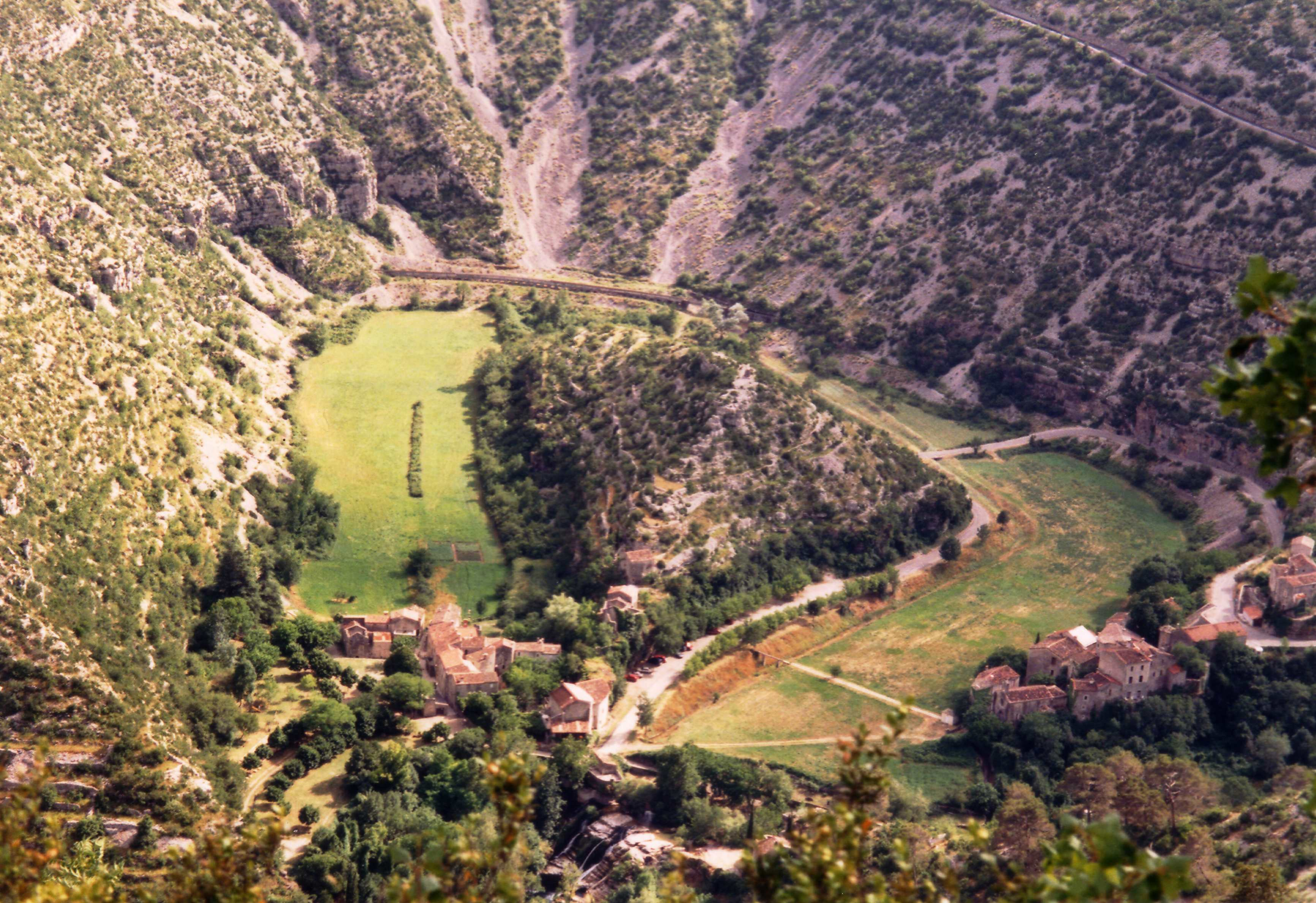
Roads within the cirque and around the central peak

== See also ==
- Vis River
- Meander
- Causse de Blandas
