= Hérault (river) =

River in southern France

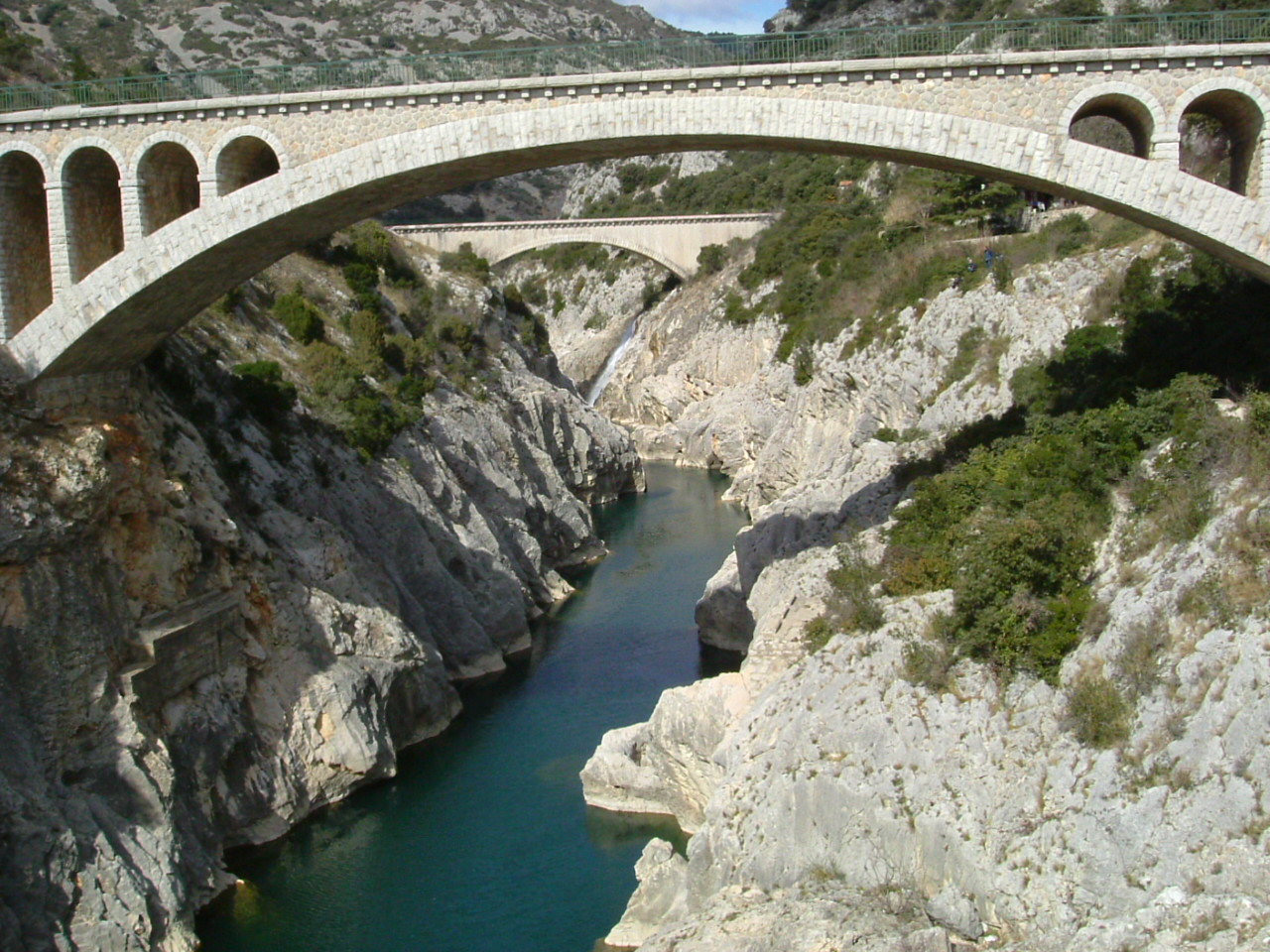
- A bridge and aqueduct over the Hérault near Saint-Guilhem-le-Désert, as seen from Pont du Diable

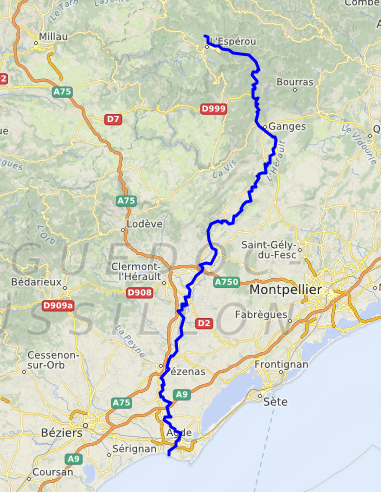
- Native name: L'Hérault (French)

Location
- Country: France

Physical characteristics
- Source
  - location: Mont Aigoual Cévennes
- Mouth
  - location: Mediterranean Sea
  - coordinates: 43°16′57″N 3°26′39″E
- Length: 147.6 km (91.7 mi)
- Basin size: 2,900 km^{2} (1,100 mi^{2})
- Discharge
  - average: 50 m^{3}/s (1,800 cu ft/s)

The Hérault (French pronunciation: [eʁo]; Occitan: Erau) is a river in southern France. Its length is 147.6 kilometres (91.7 mi). Its source is on the slopes of Mont Aigoual in the Cévennes mountains. It reaches the Mediterranean Sea near Agde.

== Name ==
The river was known in Latin as Arauris (or Araura by Strabo). The name is sometimes considered Pre-Celtic although the element Ara- suggests a Celtic root.

== Towns ==
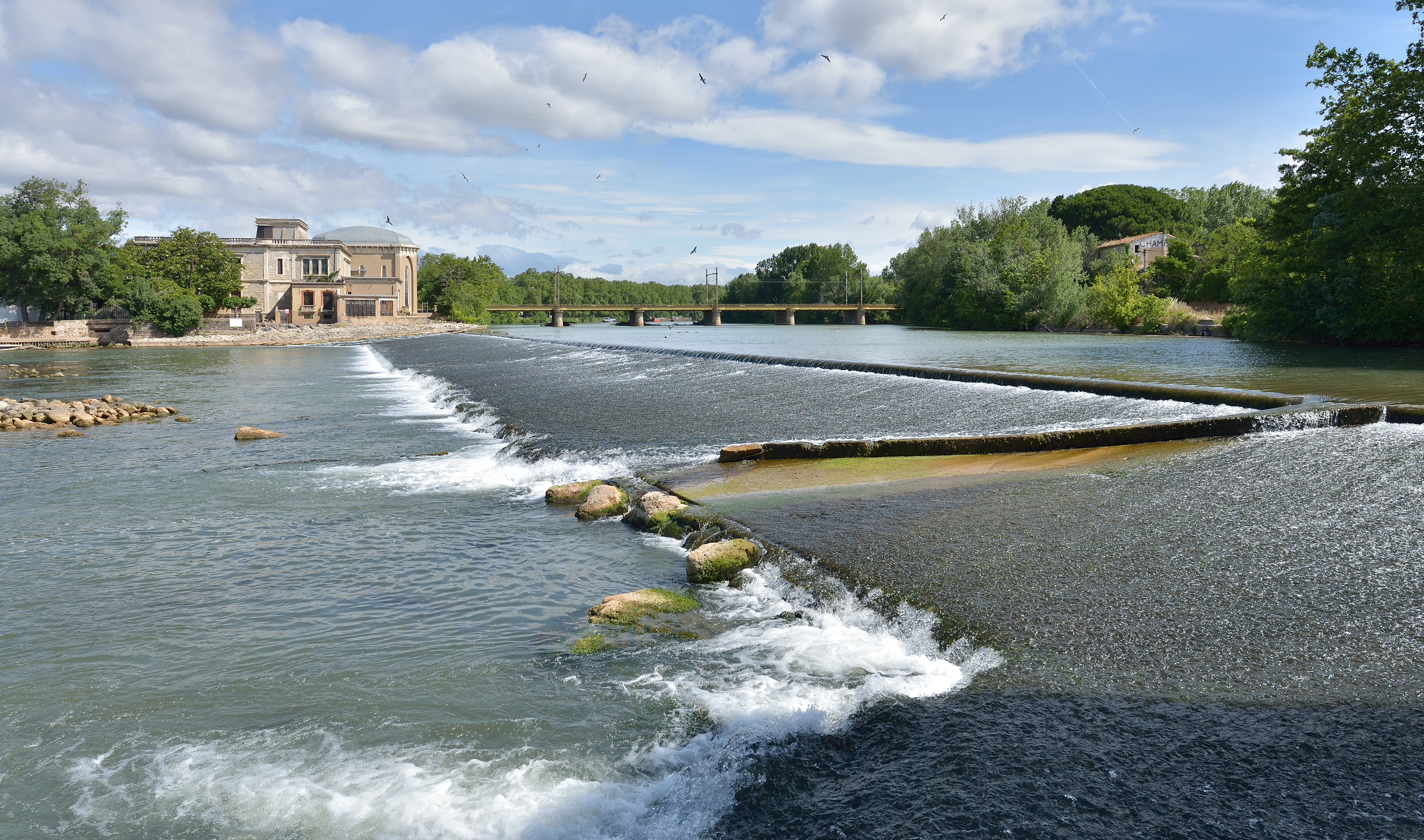
The Hérault, Agde

The Hérault flows through the following departments and towns:

- Gard: Valleraugue.
- Hérault (named after the river): Ganges, Pézenas (nearby), Agde.

== Tributaries ==
- Arre
- Vis
- Rieutord
- Buèges
- Lamalou
- Lergue
- Dourbie
- Boyne
- Peyne
- Thongue

== Navigation ==
The lower reaches of the Hérault, from Bessan to the sea at Agde, are navigable. The lowest 2.5 kilometres (1.6 mi) are tidal, whilst the next 1 kilometre (0.62 mi) forms part of the Canal du Midi. These two sections of the river are linked to each other, and to the Canal du Midi to the west, by short junction canals and the famous Agde Round Lock.

At the upper end of the section of the Hérault used by the Canal du Midi, the Prades Lock provides access to the Canal du Midi to the east. Above this lock, the river is navigable for a further 4 kilometres (2.5 mi) or so.
