= Saint-Laurent-le-Minier =

- Commune
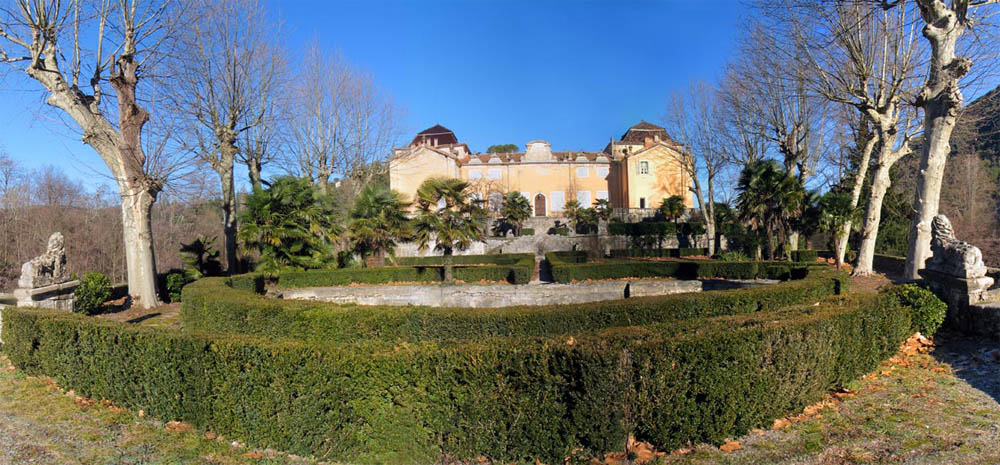
- Chateau

- Coat of arms
- Location of Saint-Laurent-le-Minier
- Location within France Location within Occitanie
- Coordinates: 43°55′59″N 3°39′18″E
- Country: France
- Region: Occitania
- Department: Gard
- Arrondissement: Le Vigan
- Canton: Le Vigan
- Intercommunality: Pays Viganais

Government
  - Mayor (2020–2026): Bruno Beltoise
- Area^{1}: 13.26 km^{2} (5.12 sq mi)
- Elevation: 170 m (560 ft)
- Highest elevation: 849 m (2,785 ft)
- Lowest elevation: 154 m (505 ft)
- Population (2023): 372
  - Density: 28.1/km^{2} (72.7/sq mi)
- Time zone: UTC+01:00 (CET)
  - Summer (DST): UTC+02:00 (CEST)
- INSEE/Postal code: 30280 /30440
- ^{1} French Land Register data, which excludes lakes, ponds, glaciers > 1 km^{2} (0.386 sq mi or 247 acres) and river estuaries.

Saint-Laurent-le-Minier (French pronunciation: [sɛ̃ loʁɑ̃ lə minje]; Occitan: Sent Laurenç del Minièr) is a commune in the Gard department in the Occitanie region in southern France. It is the southern village of the Cévennes mountains, crossed by the Vis river.

== Population ==
Historical population
Year	Pop.	±% p.a.
1968	610	—
1975	448	−4.31%
1982	384	−2.18%
1990	340	−1.51%
1999	362	+0.70%
2007	367	+0.17%
2012	367	+0.00%
2017	341	−1.46%
2023	372	+1.46%
Source: INSEE

== See also ==
- Communes of the Gard department
