= Montdardier =

- Commune
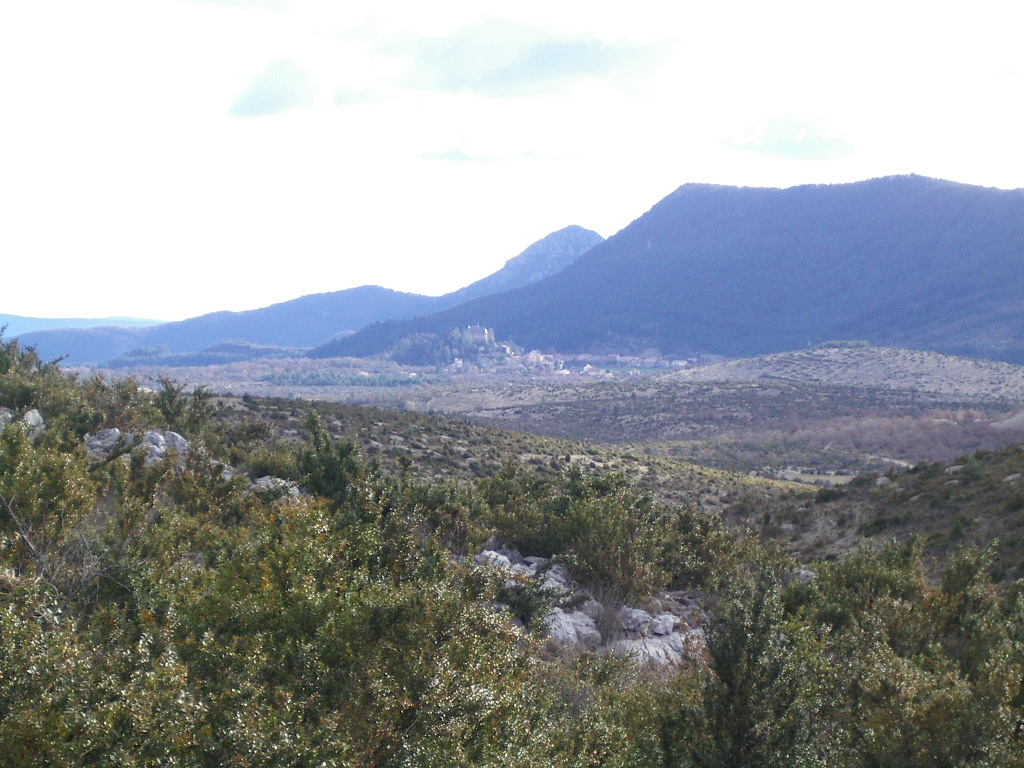
- Montdardier and the Tude forest

- Coat of arms
- Location of Montdardier
- Location within France Location within Occitanie
- Coordinates: 43°55′42″N 3°35′33″E
- Country: France
- Region: Occitania
- Department: Gard
- Arrondissement: Le Vigan
- Canton: Le Vigan
- Intercommunality: Pays viganais

Government
  - Mayor (2023–2026): Philippe Virely
- Area^{1}: 35.25 km^{2} (13.61 sq mi)
- Highest elevation: 889 m (2,917 ft)
- Lowest elevation: 259 m (850 ft)
- Population (2023): 209
  - Density: 5.93/km^{2} (15.4/sq mi)
- Time zone: UTC+01:00 (CET)
  - Summer (DST): UTC+02:00 (CEST)
- INSEE/Postal code: 30176 /30120
- ^{1} French Land Register data, which excludes lakes, ponds, glaciers > 1 km^{2} (0.386 sq mi or 247 acres) and river estuaries.

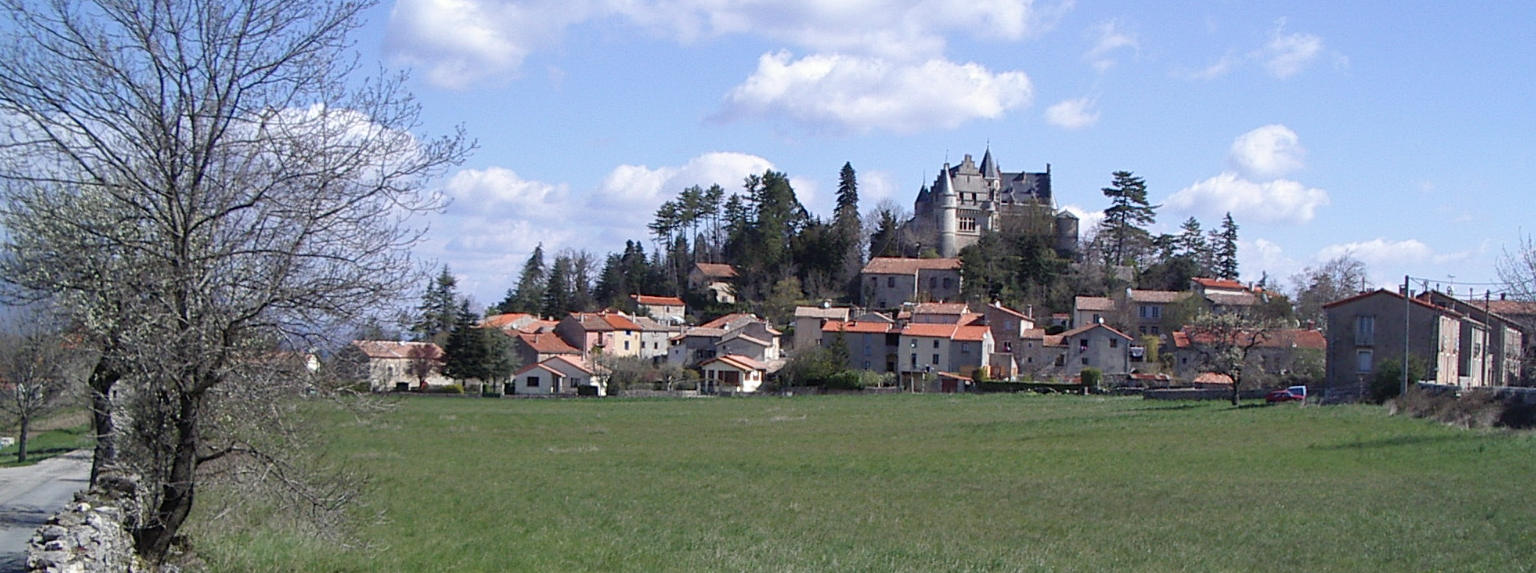
View of the village of Montdardier

Montdardier (French pronunciation: [mɔ̃daʁdje]; Occitan: Montdardièr) is a commune in the Gard department in southern France.

== Geography ==
=== Climate ===
Montdardier has a warm-summer Mediterranean climate (Köppen climate classification Csb) closely bordering on a hot-summer Mediterranean climate (Csa). The average annual temperature in Montdardier is 12.9 °C (55.2 °F). The average annual rainfall is 1,487.0 mm (58.54 in) with October as the wettest month. The temperatures are highest on average in July, at around 21.9 °C (71.4 °F), and lowest in January, at around 5.3 °C (41.5 °F). The highest temperature ever recorded in Montdardier was 40.3 °C (104.5 °F) on 28 June 2019; the coldest temperature ever recorded was −13.0 °C (8.6 °F) on 27 February 2018.

Climate data for Montdardier (1991−2020 normals, extremes 2010−present)
Month	Jan	Feb	Mar	Apr	May	Jun	Jul	Aug	Sep	Oct	Nov	Dec	Year
Record high °C (°F)	20.7 (69.3)	22.2 (72.0)	25.2 (77.4)	28.8 (83.8)	30.1 (86.2)	40.3 (104.5)	35.9 (96.6)	38.0 (100.4)	32.9 (91.2)	29.3 (84.7)	22.8 (73.0)	19.1 (66.4)	40.3 (104.5)
Mean daily maximum °C (°F)	8.9 (48.0)	9.8 (49.6)	13.2 (55.8)	16.2 (61.2)	19.7 (67.5)	24.7 (76.5)	27.9 (82.2)	27.8 (82.0)	23.2 (73.8)	17.6 (63.7)	12.2 (54.0)	9.8 (49.6)	17.6 (63.7)
Daily mean °C (°F)	5.3 (41.5)	5.5 (41.9)	8.6 (47.5)	11.5 (52.7)	14.6 (58.3)	19.1 (66.4)	21.9 (71.4)	21.7 (71.1)	17.9 (64.2)	13.5 (56.3)	8.9 (48.0)	6.4 (43.5)	12.9 (55.2)
Mean daily minimum °C (°F)	1.6 (34.9)	1.2 (34.2)	4.0 (39.2)	6.8 (44.2)	9.4 (48.9)	13.5 (56.3)	15.9 (60.6)	15.6 (60.1)	12.6 (54.7)	9.3 (48.7)	5.6 (42.1)	3.0 (37.4)	8.2 (46.8)
Record low °C (°F)	−9.5 (14.9)	−13.0 (8.6)	−3.4 (25.9)	−4.0 (24.8)	1.0 (33.8)	6.1 (43.0)	8.9 (48.0)	8.5 (47.3)	4.2 (39.6)	−1.5 (29.3)	−6.4 (20.5)	−8.5 (16.7)	−13.0 (8.6)
Average precipitation mm (inches)	148.8 (5.86)	89.9 (3.54)	96.5 (3.80)	137.1 (5.40)	103.3 (4.07)	72.3 (2.85)	42.8 (1.69)	45.0 (1.77)	156.4 (6.16)	231.1 (9.10)	216.2 (8.51)	147.6 (5.81)	1,487 (58.54)
Average precipitation days (≥ 1.0 mm)	9.4	6.8	7.2	8.9	8.4	5.6	4.5	4.9	6.3	10.5	10.1	9.1	91.7
Source: Météo-France

== Population ==
Historical population
Year	Pop.	±% p.a.
1968	215	—
1975	197	−1.24%
1982	178	−1.44%
1990	157	−1.56%
1999	187	+1.96%
2007	193	+0.40%
2012	202	+0.92%
2017	201	−0.10%
2023	209	+0.65%
Source: INSEE

== Sights ==
- The castle in neo-gothic style
- La Tude massif
- The church

Several quarries above Montdardier were formerly important sources of lithographic limestone. Stone from these quarries, marketed as Vigan stone, earned an honorable mention in the Great Exhibition of 1851.

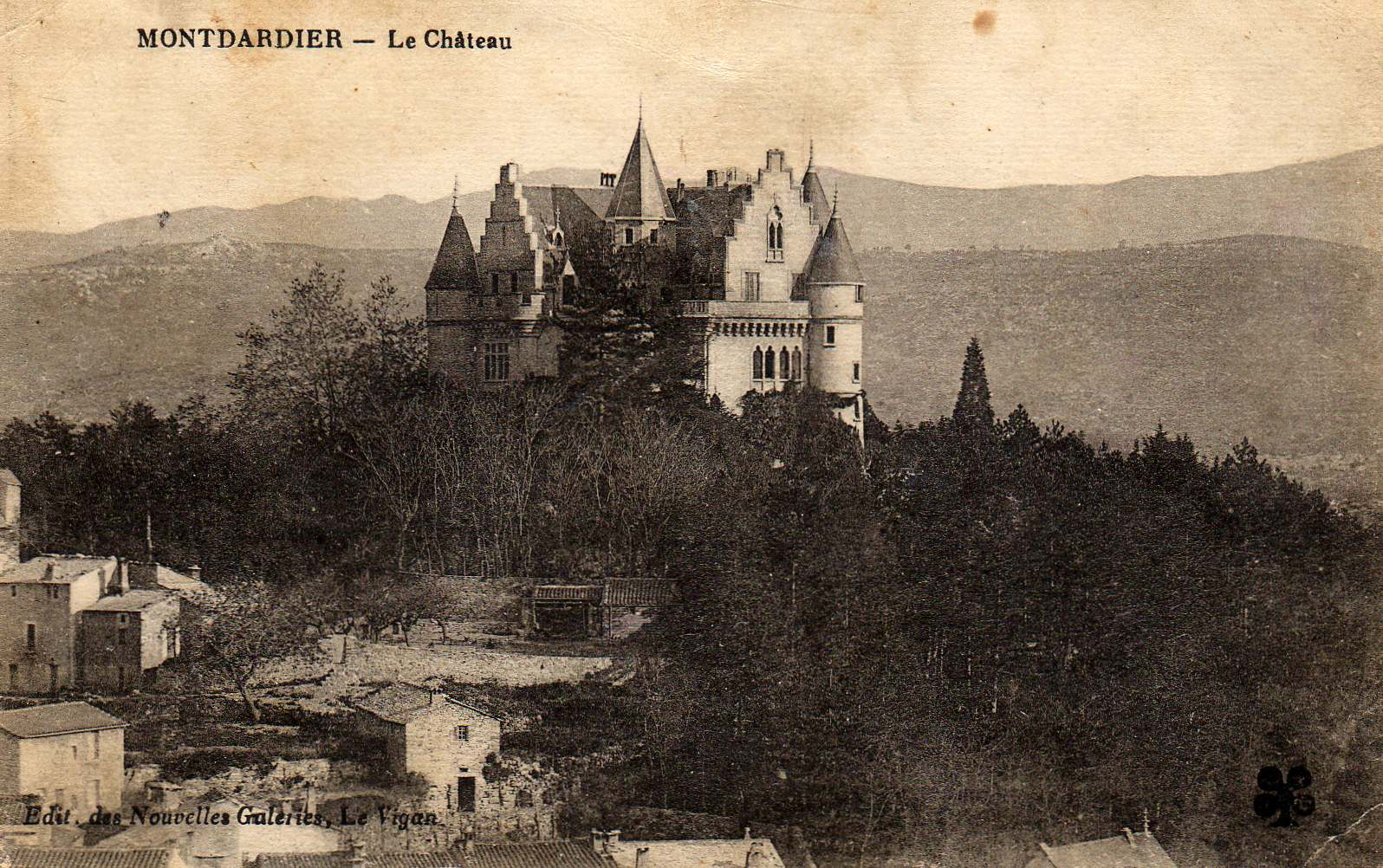
Montdardier's castle

== See also ==
- Communes of the Gard department
- Causse de Blandas
