= Cévennes =

Mountain range in France

- Occitan: Cevenas
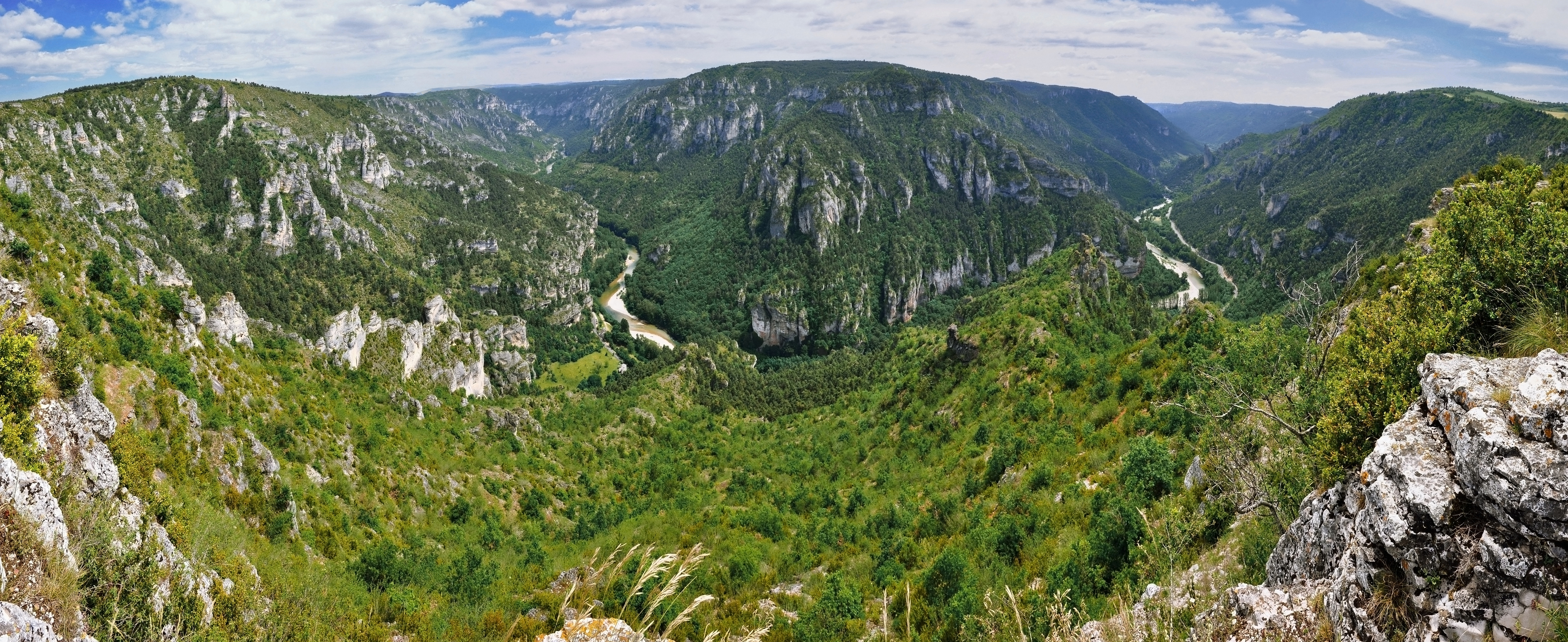
- The Gorges du Tarn

Highest point
- Peak: Sommet de Finiels
- Elevation: 1,699 m (5,574 ft)
- Coordinates: 44°25′34″N 03°44′21″E

Naming
- Pronunciation: English: /seɪˈvɛn/ say-VEN; French: [sevɛn]

Geography
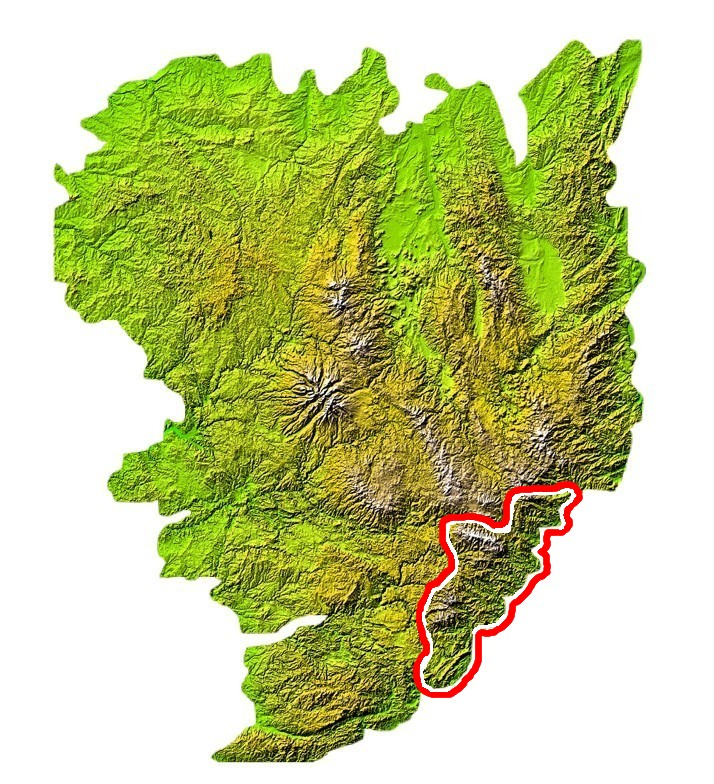
- Location in the Massif Central
- Country: France
- Départements: Gard; Lozère; Ardèche; Haute-Loire
- Parent range: Massif Central

The Cévennes (/seɪˈvɛn/ say-VEN, French: [sevɛn]; Occitan: Cevenas IPA: [seβeno̞s]) is a cultural region and range of mountains in south-central France, on the south-east edge of the Massif Central. It covers parts of the départements of Ardèche, Gard, Hérault and Lozère. Rich in geographical, natural, and cultural significance, portions of the region are protected within the Cévennes National Park, the Cévennes Biosphere Reserve (UNESCO), as well as a UNESCO World Heritage Site: Causses and the Cévennes, Mediterranean agro-pastoral Cultural Landscape. The area has been inhabited since 400,000 BCE and has numerous megaliths which were erected beginning around 2500 BCE. As an agriculturally-rich area, but not a suitable location for cities, the Cévennes developed a wide diversity of pastoral systems, including transhumance. The irrigation and road networks put in place in the early Middle Ages for these pastoral systems are still in use today.

The name Cévennes comes from the Gaulish Cebenna. As of 1999, there were 165,707 inhabitants in the region, with 20,847 living inside the UNESCO protected zone. Inhabitants of the region are known as Cévenols, from the adjective Cévenol (fem. Cévenole).

The mountain range also gives its name to a meteorological effect when cold air from the Atlantic coast meets warm air of southern winds from the Mediterranean and causes heavy autumnal downpours, often leading to floods. These are called épisodes cévenols.

== Defining the Cévennes ==
=== Etymology ===
The origin of the name Cévennes is Celtic, coming from the Gaulish Cebenna, which was Latinized by Julius Caesar as Cevenna. The Cévennes are named Cemmenon (Κέμμενων) in Strabo's Geographica. The word in Gaulish probably meant ridgeline and is related to the Breton word kein meaning back. The -vennes part of the name is likely related to the Gaelic word beinn meaning mountain or hill.

There are several popular false etymologies, one of which is that the name is derived for the words seven veins (sept veines in French) which is supposed to be a reference to the seven rivers (veins) flowing through the region. Historical references to the name that predate the French language itself preclude this possibility. Another false etymology suggests that the name comes from the Occitan word ceba (also written cebo) which means "onion", which is supposed to reference the layered structure of slate which makes up the mountains. But this is not possible as the Occitan ceba derives from Latin cepa which does not phonetically fit the references to the region in Latin and Greek Literature. Additionally, the suffix -enna, originally Celtic, was brought over into Latin, and was never used for words of Latin origin.

== Geography ==
=== Extent ===
In the larger sense, the Cévennes include nine départements: le Tarn, l'Aude, l'Hérault, l'Aveyron, le Gard, la Lozère, l'Ardèche, le Rhône and la Loire. More strictly the Cévennes encompasses the Lozère and the Gard. The Parc national des Cévennes is almost entirely within Lozère.

The principal towns and villages of the Cévennes are Alès, Le Vigan, Sumène, Valleraugue, Ganges, Hérault, Saint-Hippolyte-du-Fort, Sauve, Lasalle, Saint-André-de-Valborgne, Saint-Jean-du-Gard, Anduze, Florac, Saint-Germain-de-Calberte, le Pont-de-Montvert, Villefort, Génolhac, Bessèges, Saint-Ambroix, Gagnières, Les Vans, Mende.

=== Description ===
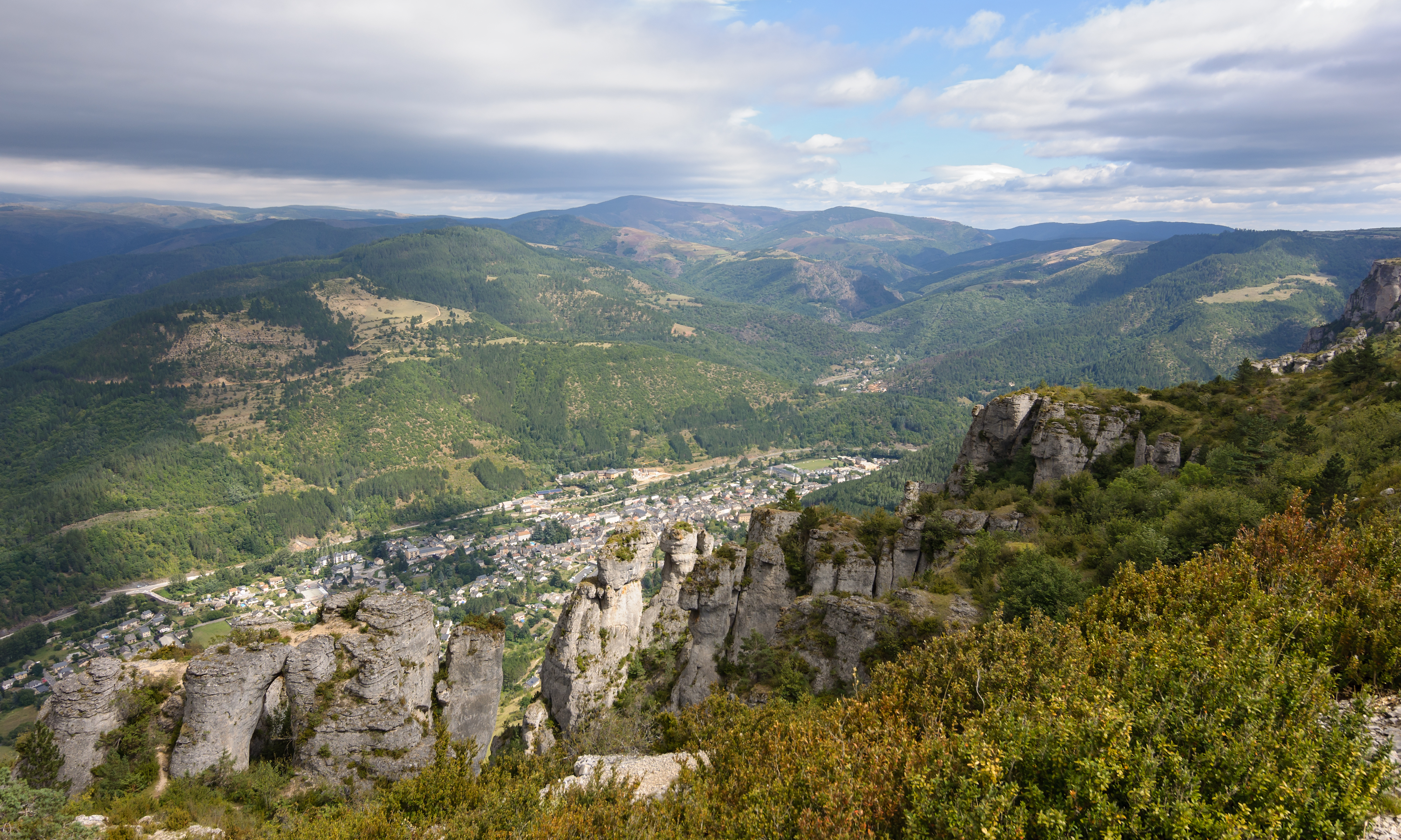
Cévennes view

The Cévennes mountains run from southwest (Grandes causses (Causses de Blandas and Larzac) to northeast (Monts du Vivarais), with the highest point being the Mont Lozère (1699m). The Mont Aigoual (1567m) is on the border of two departments. The Loire and Allier flowing towards the Atlantic Ocean, as well as the Ardèche and tributary Chassezac, Cèze, the different rivers Gardons to the Rhône, Vidourle, Hérault and Dourbie that flow to the Mediterranean Sea, have their headwaters in the Cévennes. Cévennes National Park was created in the region in 1970 and the Parc Naturel Régional des Monts d'Ardèche also preserves some of the natural areas. Two canyons are near the region: the Gorges de la Jonte (the Jonte gorge) and the Gorges du Tarn (the Tarn gorge). This is a socio-economic marginal region, while bio-geographically, there is altitudinal stratification and a gradient between the mountainous centre and the mediterranean littoral ecologies.

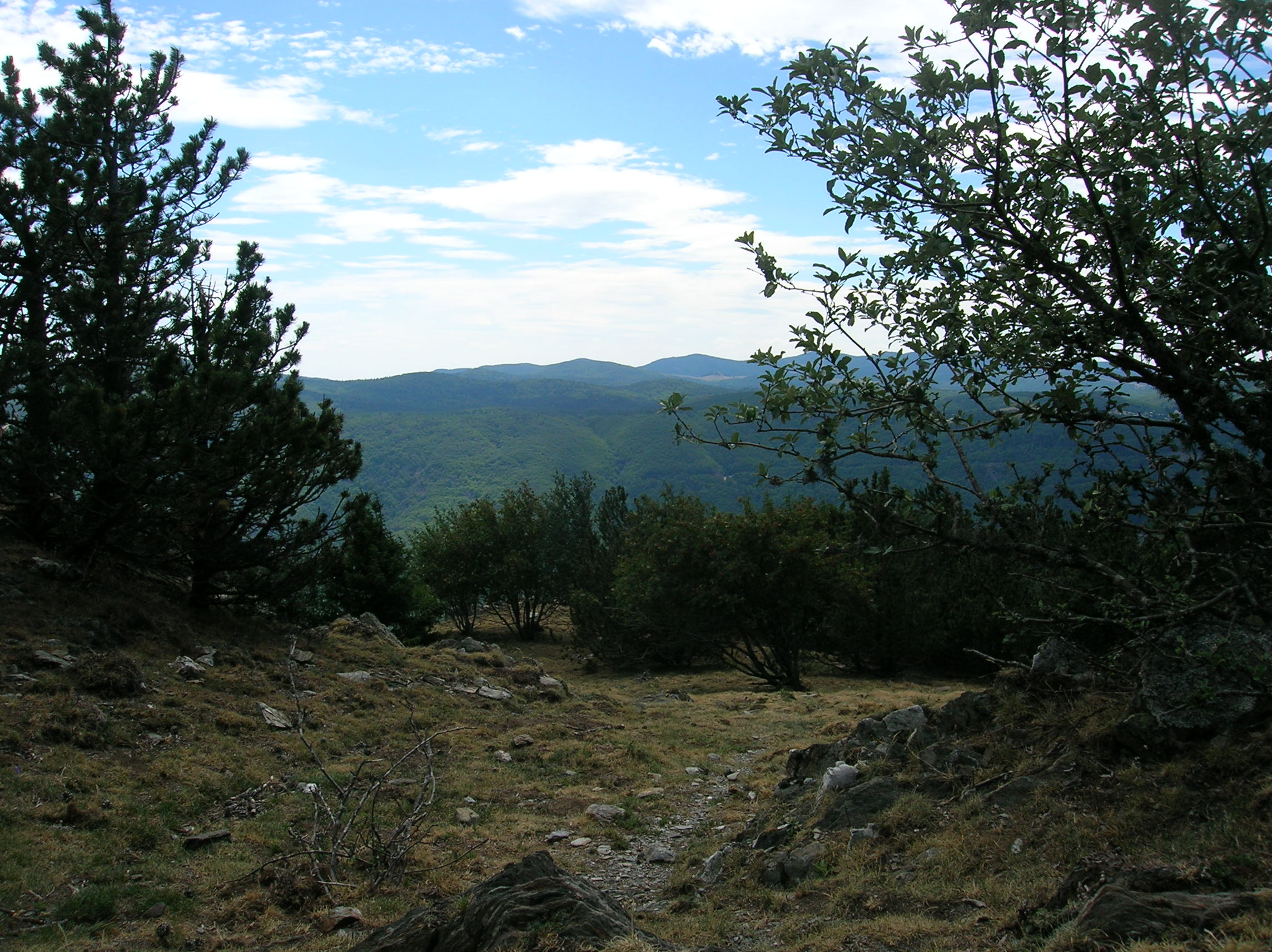
Les Cévennes from le mont Aigoual

=== Geology ===
The Cévennes form the south eastern fragment of the Massif Central, separated from the related Montagne Noire by the limestone Causses. The basement rocks of granites and schists were uplifted by the Variscan orogeny forming a discontinuity, with the subsequent erosion infilling the lower voids for much of Permian and Triassic period (280–195 Ma), while changing sea levels added a thick limestone covering, with only the tops of the Cévennes protruding as islands in the Jurassic sea. This in turn was eroded. In late Cretaceous and early Tertiary times, further mountain building occurred. The Alpine orogeny lifted and deformed the Alps and the Pyrenees, though the Massif Central acted as a rigid block, and the cover rocks remained mostly horizontal. Some have been folded through later faulting at the time of the opening of the western Mediterranean in Tertiary times. The principal rivers of the region have cut deeply into the limestone forming deep gorges: Gorges du Tarn, Gorges de la Jonte, Lot, Gorges de l'Ardèche, Cèze etc. The Cévennes form the watershed between the Atlantic and Mediterranean.

== Population and history ==
=== Prehistory ===
Transhumance is most likely the beginning of human activity in the Cévennes but little trace has been found of humans from the Paleolithic era except in the southern portion around Ganges and Saint-Hippolyte-du-Fort which contains a large quantity of caves rich with archeological evidence such as "La Roque Aynier" (Ganges), and "Baume Dolente" (Vebron) which suggest the presence of Magdalenian peoples (17,000–12,000 BCE).

By the Neolithic epoch, which lasted from about 12,000 BCE to around 2,300 BCE in France (Bronze Age in France), transhumance and hunting were prevalent throughout the entire Cévennes with developments such as pottery moving from south to north in the region. Sheep were common in Mediterranean France before 7000 BCE and numerous prehistoric pots and tools have been recovered dating from as early as 4000 BCE. Around this time many Megalithic constructions such as stone circles, dolmen, and menhirs appeared in the area, with the second largest megalithic site in Europe, the stone rows of Bondons, being created around 3,000–2,500 BCE, and important sites such as the stone circles around Blandas in the south appearing between 3,500–2,500 BCE.

=== Ancient ===
The Celts arrived in the area sometime in the Iron Age between 800–400 BCE, and most of what is known about their presence in the area is from Latin historians. In the 3rd century BCE, the Arverne Confederation was formed of several tribes who used the Cévennes as a defensive feature to prevent the Romans from taking their territories. By the time the Romans successfully conquered the area in 121 BC, several tribes of celtic Gauls were living around the Cévennes: the Ruteni in the west, the Gabali in the north, the Volcae Arecomici in the south, the Helvii in the southeast and the Vellavi in the northeast. The Volcae Arecomici voluntarily surrendered their territory to the Romans, and the Arverni gave up much territory in a treaty that nevertheless preserved their independence.

Under Roman control, Le Vigan was part of the Roman "Provincia," (hence Provence) called Gallia Narbonensis. Julius Caesar crossed the Cévennes mountains in the winter of 52 BCE, having his soldiers clear paths in up to six feet of snow, to attack the Averne Confederation.

The Visigoths took control of the western half of Gallia Narbonensis in 462 CE, a part known as Septimania which included Le Vigan, and they retained control despite attempts in 586 and 589 CE when the Frankish, Merovingian King Guntram attempted to conquer the area from the north.

=== Middle Ages ===
In 587 the region came under Catholic rule with the conversion of the Visigoth king Reccared I. In 719, the Moor Al-Samh conquered Septimania as part of the Umayyad invasion of Gaul and the Franks struggled to take it back over the next several decades, but the southern slopes of the Cévennes were permanently reconquered by 752. King Pepin the Short reconquered the whole of Septimania in 759.

In the High Middle Ages, the region saw the flourishing of Romanesque architecture and monastic implantation, like Mazan Abbey. It was during this time that large-scale clearings took place under the lead of abbots and monks, allowing more space to be cultivated by the local people.

The northern part of the region suffered greatly from the Hundred Years War. The English and their mercenaries occupied the Gevaudan and raided the Velay. In 1380 Bertrand Duguesclin died of illness while besieging Chateauneuf-de-Randon, a fortified city then under English occupation.

=== The "Desert" period and the Camisards War ===
French Protestants, also called the Huguenots, were established in the Cévennes by the beginning of the 16th century. They were often persecuted and lacked the freedom to worship openly, so they kept away from cities. They worshiped in deserted wilderness areas: forests, caves, and gullies. The Edict of Nantes in 1598 gave some relief and freedom of worship to Protestants but also concentrated the power of the Catholic Church in France.

The Edict of Fontainebleau, on October 1685, revoked the Edict of Nantes, and forbade Protestant worship services. It called for the destruction of temples, exiling pastors, and forced Catholic instruction on the children. The borders were closed in response to the exodus of Huguenots from the area and the resulting economic losses. The Huguenots who stayed resisted and, known as Camisards in the Cévennes, they took up arms to fight for their religious freedom. As many as 3,000 Protestants fought against 30,000 royal troops from 1702 till 1704. Sporadic fighting continued until 1715. The Edict of Versailles in 1787, and the French Revolution and the Declaration of the Rights of Man and of the Citizen in 1789, finally brought a political solution to the struggles and gave non-Catholics the right to practice their religion openly.

=== Modern ===
In the 21st century, the region still has a large community of French Protestants. They identify as Huguenots, descendants of peoples who have inhabited the mountains since before the 16th century. During the reign of Louis XIV, much of the Huguenot population fled France, particularly following the Revocation of the Edict of Nantes in 1685. The Protestant community in the Cévennes largely remained in place, protected from attack by the hilly terrain. This area became a refuge from persecution for other Huguenots during the time.

In 1702, this Huguenot population, dubbed the Camisards, rose up against the monarchy to protect their religious freedom. The two sides agreed to peace in 1715, which enabled the local Protestant Huguenot population to continue living in the Cévennes. Their descendants have continued to live there to the present day.

During World War II, a network of families in the Cévennes sheltered a number of Jews from capture by the Nazis. These efforts, organized by local Protestant pastors, ultimately protected hundreds from capture and likely death.

== Popular culture ==
- Vincent d'Indy, a composer of Ardèche origin, wrote the Symphonie Cévenole (known in English as his Symphony on a French Mountain Air).
- Robert Louis Stevenson, a Scottish writer, visited the Cévennes in 1878 and wrote Travels with a Donkey in the Cévennes (1879) about his experiences.
- Captain W E Johns, the popular British children's author from the 20th century who created aviation hero 'Biggles', also created a female pilot heroine, 'Worrals'. 'Worrals on the War-Path' is set in the Cevennes during the Second World war, and the book features Causse Mejean as a primary location.

== Transport ==
3-hour TGV from Paris, 1h30 flight from London (Luton) to Nîmes (Garons), the closest international airport and 3h30 drive from Barcelona.

=== By car ===
- A75 Montpellier – Clermont-Ferrand – Paris
- A9 (la Languedocienne) Barcelona (Espagne) – Montpellier

== Tourism ==
- The Corniche des Cévennes (the D 907) is a spectacular road between St-Jean-Gard and Florac. It was constructed at the beginning of the 18th century to enable the movement of Louis XIV's troops during his conflict with the Camisards.
- The Robert Louis Stevenson trail through the Cévennes National Park has both short and long stretches for all skill levels. The trails feature spectacular views and stillness.
