= Cévennes National Park =

French national park in Lozère, Gard, Ardèche and Aveyron

- Parc national des Cévennes
- IUCN category V (protected landscape/seascape)
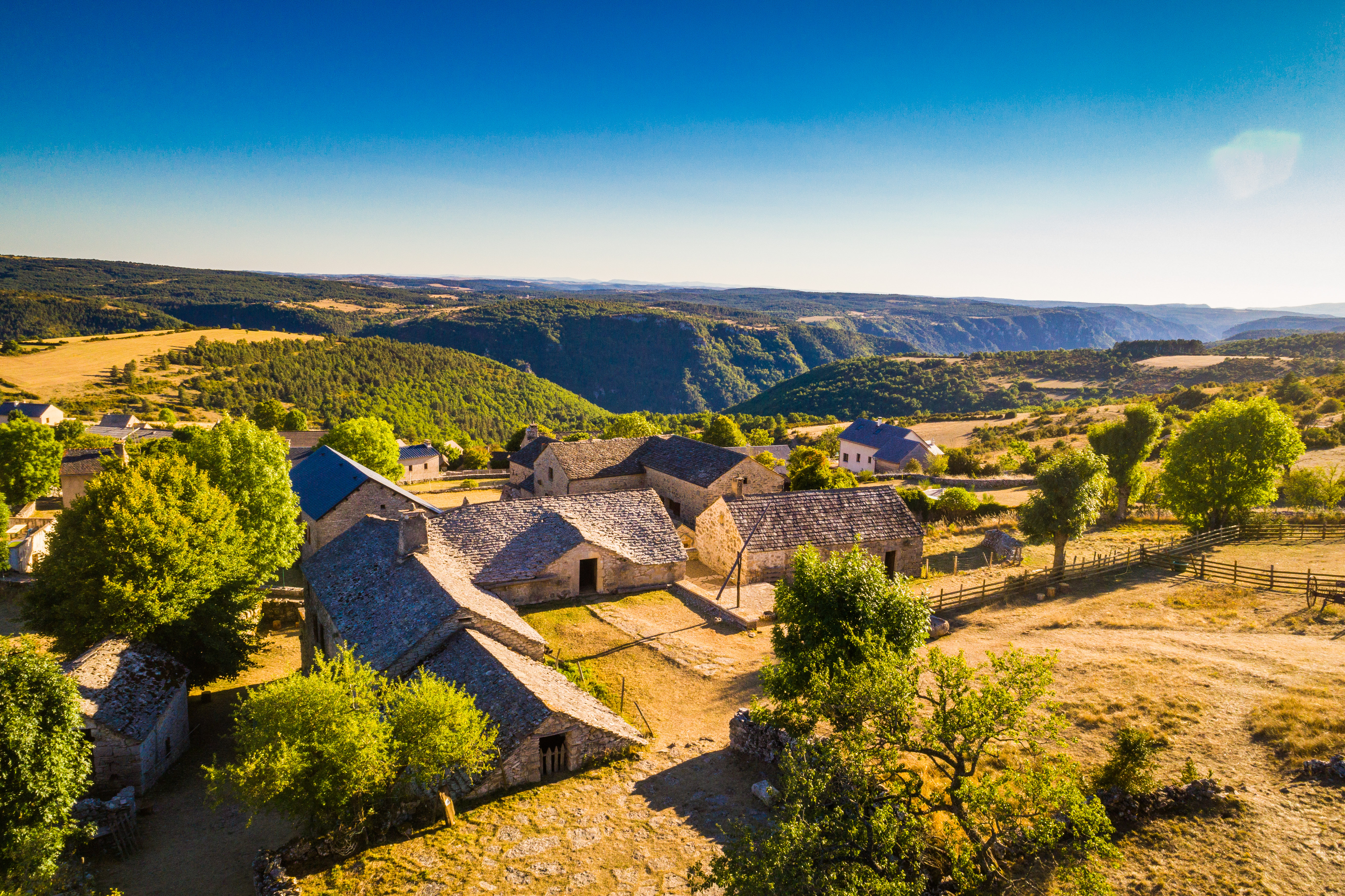
- Causse Méjean

- Location within France Location within Occitanie
- Location: Lozère, Gard, Ardèche and Aveyron, France
- Nearest city: Florac
- Coordinates: 44°11′38″N 3°34′53″E
- Area: 937 km^{2} (362 sq mi)
- Established: 2 September 1970
- Governing body: Parcs nationaux de France
- Website: www.cevennes-parcnational.fr

The Causses and the Cévennes, Mediterranean agro-pastoral Cultural Landscape
UNESCO World Heritage Site
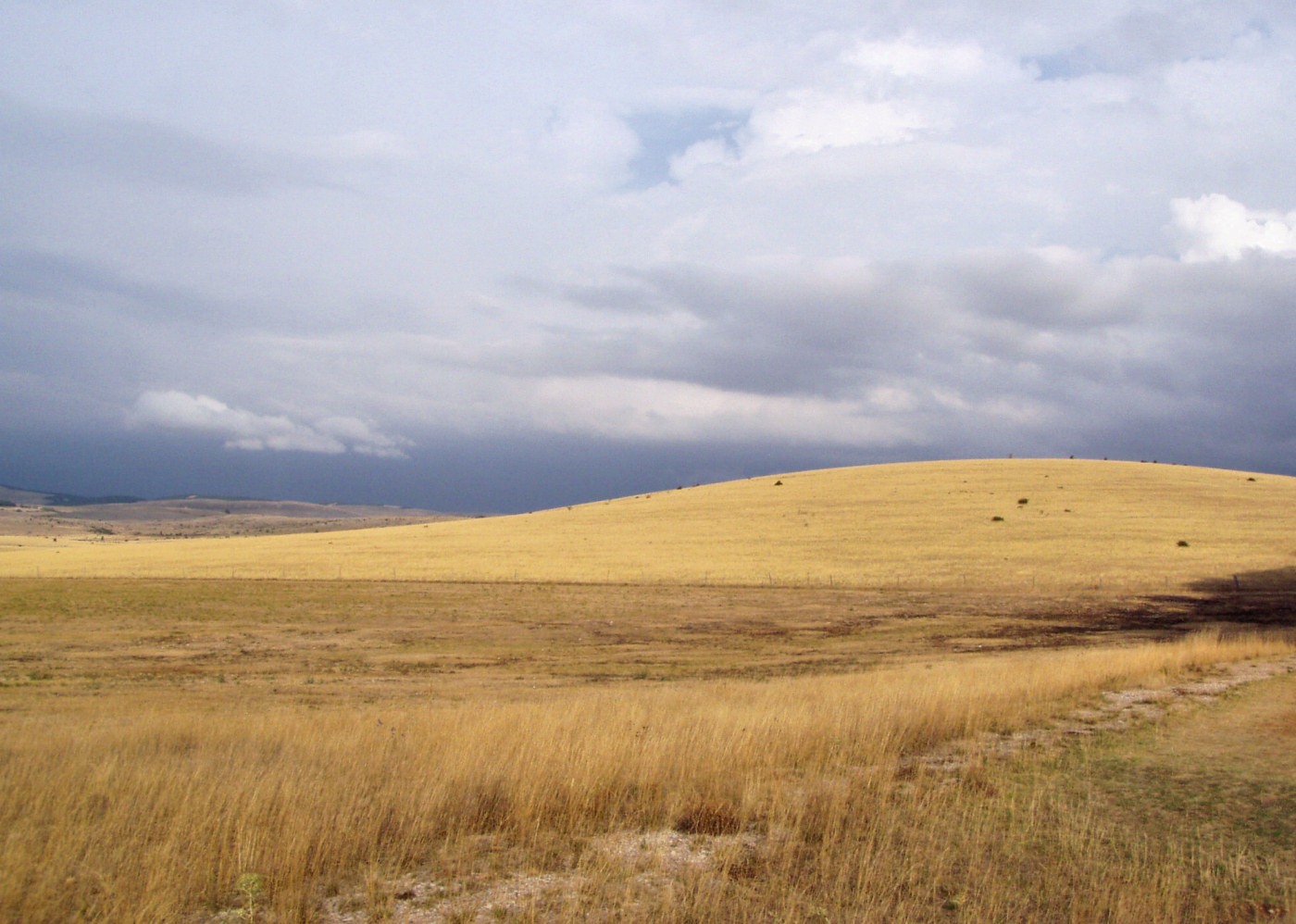
- Causse Méjean in Massif Central, Cévennes National Park, France
- Interactive map of The Causses and the Cévennes, Mediterranean agro-pastoral Cultural Landscape
- Criteria: Cultural: iii, v
- Reference: 1153
- Inscription: 2011 (35th Session)
- Area: 302,319 ha (747,050 acres)
- Buffer zone: 312,425 ha (772,020 acres)

Cévennes National Park (French: Parc national des Cévennes) is a French national park located in Southern France, in the mountainous area of Cévennes.

Created in 1970, the park has its administrative seat in Florac at Florac Castle. It is located mainly in the departments of Lozère and Gard; it also covers some parts of Ardèche and Aveyron, therefore stretching across a record number of departments for a national park. The Aven Armand cave is located in the park. In 2011, the Park was made a part of The Causses and the Cévennes, Mediterranean agro-pastoral Cultural Landscape UNESCO World Heritage Site.

== Geography ==

The park includes several mountains and plateaus, including: Mont Lozère, Mont Aigoual, Causse Méjean, France. Mont Lozère is the highest peak in the area, reaching 1,699 metres.

== History ==
The Cévennes country is rich in history, with a strong cultural identity, being at the heart of Camisard revolt, which followed the revocation of the Edict of Nantes (the Edict of Fontainebleau), after which Protestants were actively persecuted. Numerous testimonies of Camisard war in the Cévennes abund in towns and villages of the Cévennes National Park. A permanent exhibition devoted to the memory of Camisards has been elaborated at the old temple of Le Rouve (commune of Saint-André-de-Lancize).

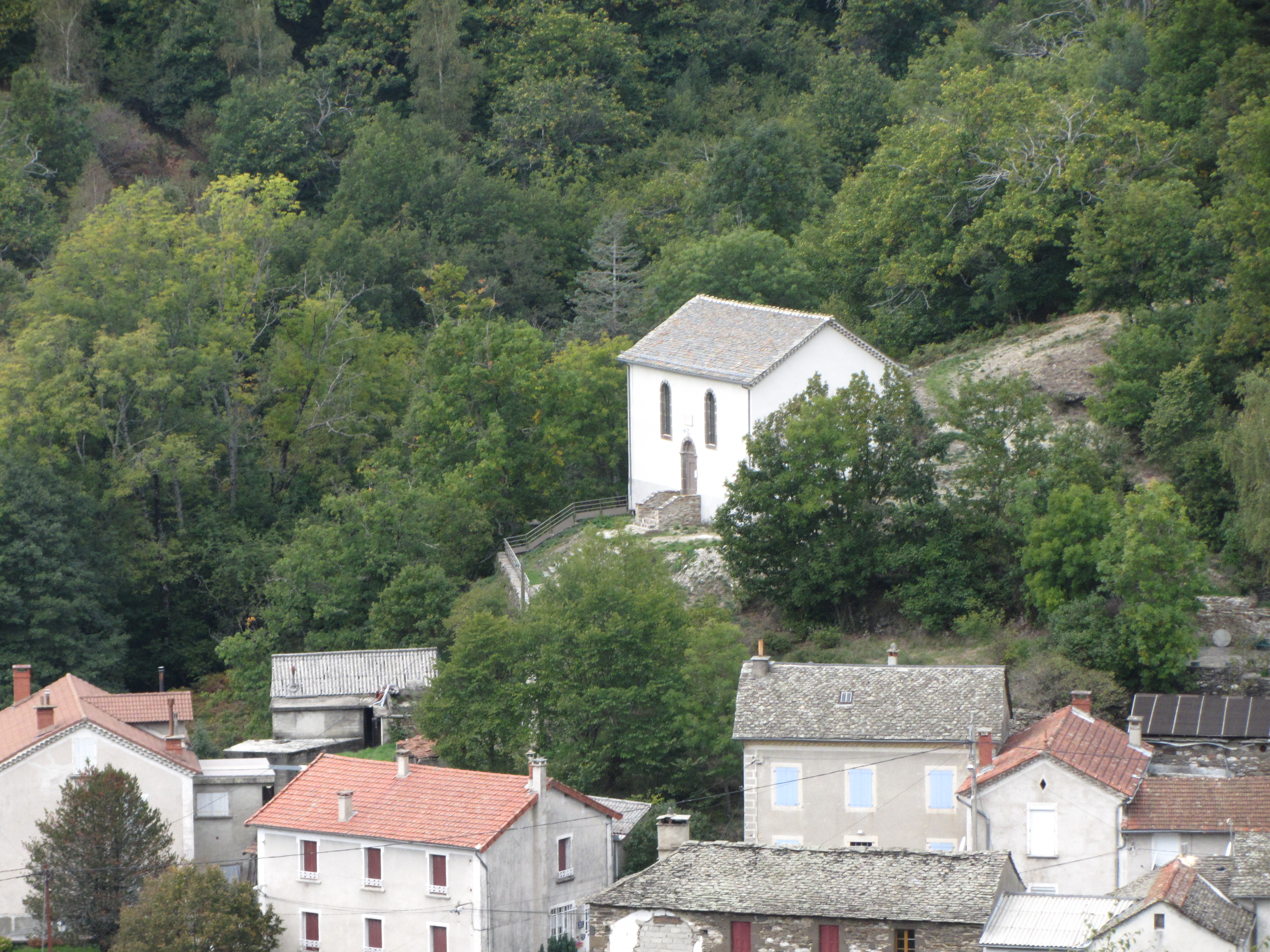
The temple of Rouve Bas: today desacralized, it is a memorial devoted to the Camisard war in Bougès mountains (Cévennes)

== Points of interest ==
- Arboretum de Cazebonne
- Aven Armand

== See also ==
- List of national parks of France
- Travels with a Donkey in the Cévennes (1879) by Robert Louis Stevenson
- Flora of the Massif central
