= Causses and Cévennes =

UNESCO World Heritage Site in France

UNESCO World Heritage Site
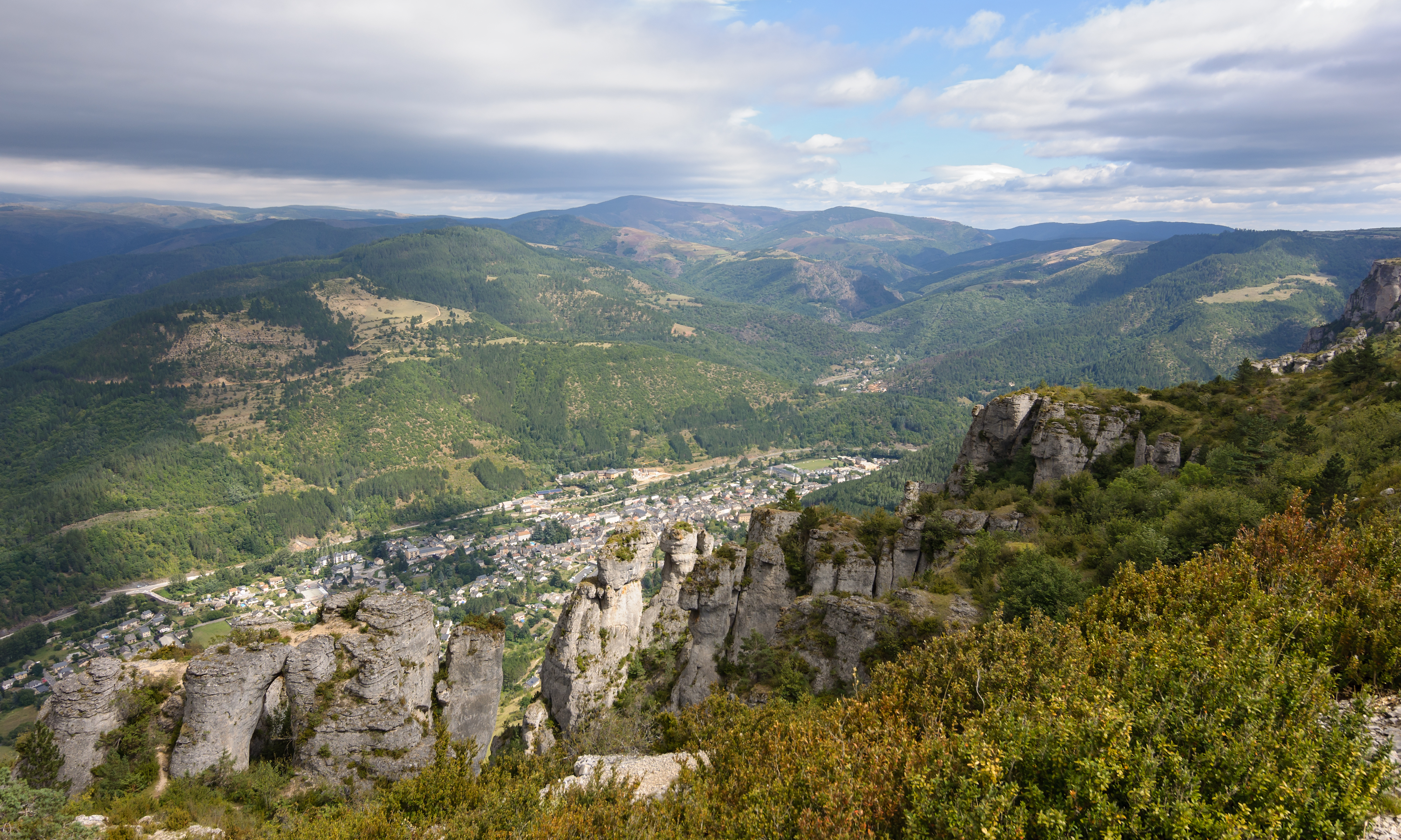
- Florac and the Cévennes National Park seen from Causse Méjean

- Location within France
- Official name: The Causses and the Cévennes, Mediterranean agro-pastoral Cultural Landscape
- Location: Massif Central, France
- Criteria: Cultural: (iii), (v)
- Reference: 1153rev
- Inscription: 2011 (35th Session)
- Area: 302,319 ha (747,050 acres)
- Buffer zone: 312,425 ha (772,020 acres)
- Website: www.causses-et-cevennes.fr/en/
- Coordinates: 44°13′13″N 3°28′23″E

The Causses and the Cévennes, Mediterranean agro-pastoral Cultural Landscape (French: Les Causses et Les Cévennes, paysage culturel de l'agro-pastoralisme méditerranéen) is a UNESCO World Heritage Site located in the southern part of central France with over three millennia of agro-pastoral history.

Located in the Massif Central, the region is mountainous with numerous narrow valleys, making conditions poorly suited to host cities, but well-suited for pastoralism. Consequently, the landscape of Causses and Cévennes evolved over time to reflect all types of Mediterranean agro-pastoral systems, including silvopasture, transhumance, and sedentary pastoralism. In fact, Mont Lozère is one of the last places where summer transhumance is still practiced in the traditional way.

== History ==
The Causses and the Cévennes retain numerous testimonies of this evolution of pastoralism over 3000 years. During the Bronze Age, large sections of the forested areas were clearcut to allow for sheep and cattle pastures. Between the 12th and 14th centuries monastic orders took control of the area, putting stronger irrigation systems and a road system in place. The founding of these religious orders and development of nearby cities in the surrounding plains throughout the Middle Ages reinforced the agro-pastoral systems, and they are still present in the area today. Between the 16th and 18th centuries, Cévennes became renowned for its chestnut, sheep, and silk production, which led to a boom in population and the building of large farmhouses. However, a combination of silkworm disease and the First World War began an emigration from the region towards larger cities.

== Site description ==
The world heritage site encompasses many of the structures vital for the continued pastoralism in the area. The irrigation systems, developed and controlled first by Benedictine abbeys in the early Middle Ages, divert runoff from the higher mountains into a system of conduits and underground channels which then irrigate stone terraces at each farm. This irrigation method is still in use today. In addition, the agricultural advances made by the Knights Templar in the area during the Middle Ages are still operational today, including roof cisterns, ponds, and granaries. The road system developed in the 12th century for the droving of sheep and cattle is likewise still used by farmers. In total, there are 300 kilometers of the medieval droving roads within the site.

In the relatively open landscape of the Causses, low stone buildings are used for housing sheep during the winter, called les Jasses, and there are many large, limestone farmhouses. In contrast, structures in the Cévennes are usually made with shale or granite, with straw roofs. Chestnut trees and buildings for growing silk worms that date to the 16-18th centuries are also protected by the site.

== Inscription history and criteria ==
The site was originally added to France's Tentative List in 2002 and was considered for inscription by the Committee at its 30th session in Vilnius, Lithuania under criteria (v) and (vi). ICOMOS recommending deferring inscription. France framed Criterion (v) for the site as being the "last bastion of the agropastoral system in Western Europe" while ICOMOS considered this to not be the case. Criterion (vi) was framed as the site "keeps alive the memory of episodes related to the diffusion of French Protestantism, fights with the Catholic Church, and the development of ideas of liberty and freedom". ICOMOS considered that this element was not of universal significance, but of national significance only as sites elsewhere in Europe also testify to the persecution of Protestants and the impact thereof on national history. In 2009, ICOMOS also requested that France justify the boundary of the property and provide a basis for managing and sustaining the site's agro-pastoral traditions. When France resubmitted its nomination file, focus was laid on the historic aspect of pastoralism and its impact to the site's cultural development, while reference to the site's testament to historical events, Criterion (vi), was dropped. The site successfully inscribed on the World Heritage List in 2011.

The site was inscribed on the list in 2011 by the World Heritage Committee at its 35th session in Paris, France. The site was inscribed on the basis of Criterion (iii), "bearing unique testimony to a cultural tradition", as it is an outstanding example of Mediterranean agro-pastoralism, and Criterion (v), "an outstanding example of human interaction with the environment", as the landscape demonstrates the way the system has developed over millennia.
