= Rogues, Gard =

Rogues
- Commune
- Coat of arms
- Location of Rogues
- Location within France Location within Occitanie
- Coordinates: 43°53′21″N 3°34′21″E
- Country: France
- Region: Occitania
- Department: Gard
- Arrondissement: Le Vigan
- Canton: Le Vigan
- Intercommunality: Pays Viganais

Government
  - Mayor (2020–2026): Martine Durand
- Area^{1}: 30.22 km^{2} (11.67 sq mi)
- Elevation: 560 m (1,840 ft)
- Highest elevation: 685 m (2,247 ft)
- Lowest elevation: 215 m (705 ft)
- Population (2023): 83
  - Density: 2.7/km^{2} (7.1/sq mi)
- Time zone: UTC+01:00 (CET)
  - Summer (DST): UTC+02:00 (CEST)
- INSEE/Postal code: 30219 /30120
- ^{1} French Land Register data, which excludes lakes, ponds, glaciers > 1 km^{2} (0.386 sq mi or 247 acres) and river estuaries.

Rogues (French pronunciation: [ʁɔɡ]; Occitan: Rògas) is a commune in the Gard department in southern France.

== Population ==
Historical population
Year	Pop.	±% p.a.
1968	101	—
1975	126	+3.21%
1982	124	−0.23%
1990	133	+0.88%
1999	128	−0.42%
2007	106	−2.33%
2012	104	−0.38%
2017	107	+0.57%
2023	83	−4.14%
Source: INSEE

== See also ==
- Communes of the Gard department
- Causse de Blandas
