= Ganges, Hérault =

Ganges
- Commune
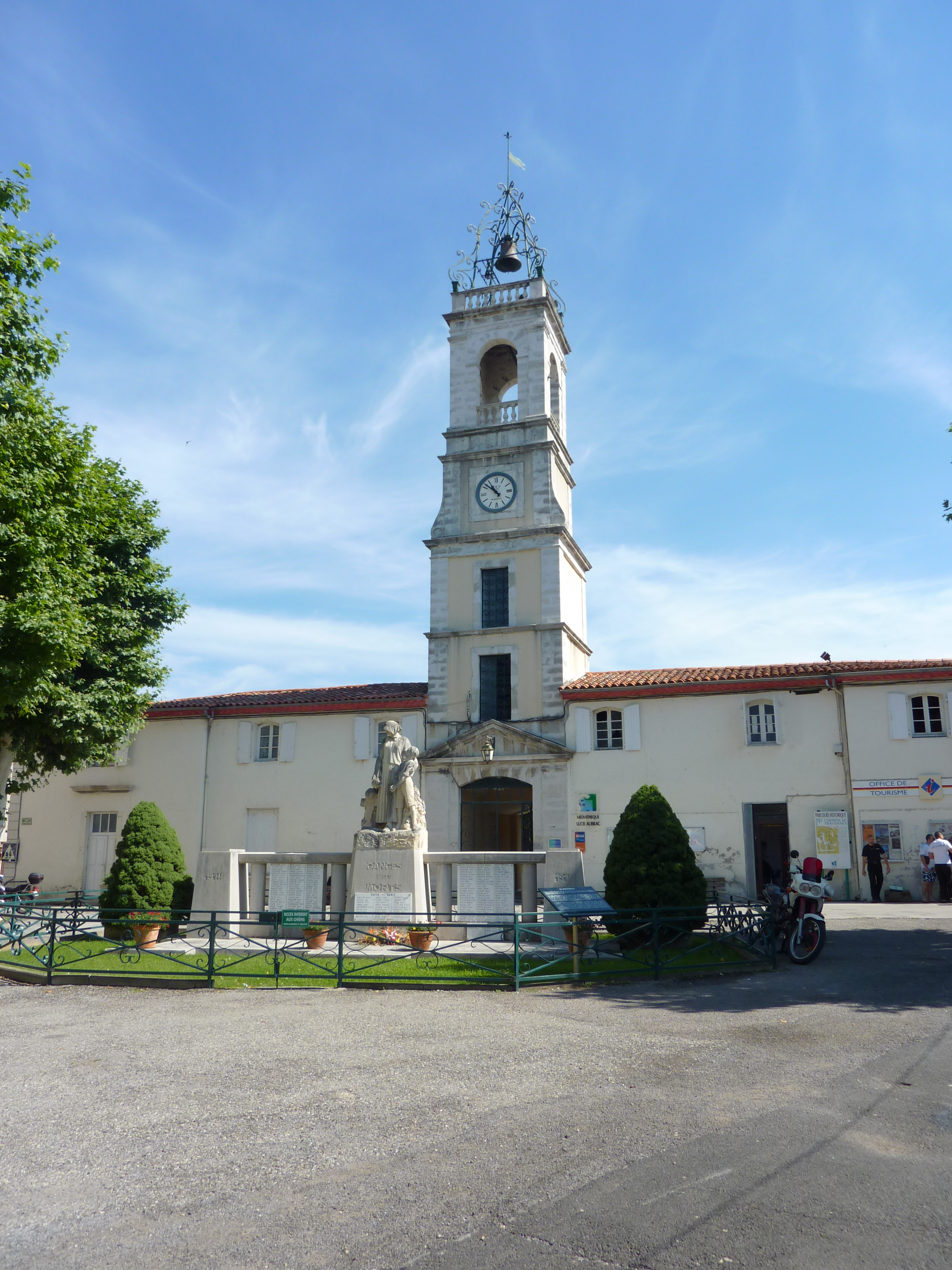
- Town hall

- Coat of arms
- Location of Ganges
- Location within France Location within Occitanie
- Coordinates: 43°56′06″N 3°42′33″E
- Country: France
- Region: Occitania
- Department: Hérault
- Arrondissement: Lodève
- Canton: Lodève
- Intercommunality: Cévennes Gangeoises et Suménoises

Government
  - Mayor (2020–2026): Michel Fratissier
- Area^{1}: 7.16 km^{2} (2.76 sq mi)
- Elevation: 186 m (610 ft)
- Highest elevation: 540 m (1,770 ft)
- Lowest elevation: 138 m (453 ft)
- Population (2023): 3,724
  - Density: 520/km^{2} (1,350/sq mi)
- Time zone: UTC+01:00 (CET)
  - Summer (DST): UTC+02:00 (CEST)
- INSEE/Postal code: 34111 /34190
- ^{1} French Land Register data, which excludes lakes, ponds, glaciers > 1 km^{2} (0.386 sq mi or 247 acres) and river estuaries.

Ganges (French pronunciation: [ɡɑ̃ʒ]; Languedocien: Gange) is a commune in the Hérault department in Occitanie in southern France.

== Location ==
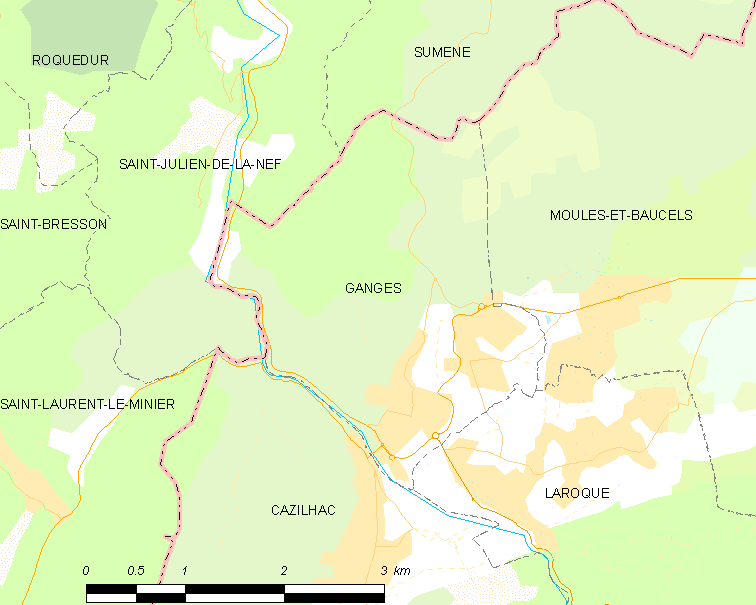
Map

Ganges is situated at the confluence of the Hérault and Rieutord rivers.

== History ==
The castle, of which only ruins remain, was the scene of a murder in the 17th century that was the subject of Gothic fiction by both the Marquis de Sade and Alexandre Dumas Père. The beautiful Dianne de Roussan was killed by her husband's brothers, who wanted her large fortune. They were caught and subsequently executed.

Ganges became prosperous from the manufacture of fine silk stockings during the reign of Louis XIV. Natural silk was replaced by artificial, and later by nylon, and cottage industry gave way to factories; half a dozen or so still produce high quality stockings.

As a predominantly Huguenot town, it was involved in the Camisard revolts of the late 17th and early 18th century and suffered from the anti-Protestant Dragonnades of the French monarchy.

In August 1944, German forces retreating from Toulouse tried to force a way down the Hérault valley through Ganges towards Nimes; they were repelled on August 24 by the defence of the Aigoual-Cévennes maquis.

== Population ==
Historical population
Year	Pop.	±% p.a.
1968	4,872	—
1975	3,858	−3.28%
1982	3,533	−1.25%
1990	3,343	−0.69%
1999	3,502	+0.52%
2007	3,943	+1.49%
2012	3,979	+0.18%
2017	4,024	+0.23%
2023	3,724	−1.28%
Source: INSEE

== Tourism ==
The area around Ganges offers extensive activities, including kayaking, gliding and go-karting.

The moped mobylette was created by a resident of Ganges and a plaque near the old town commemorates this fact.

== International relations ==
Ganges is the twin town of Schwalmtal (Germany).

== Famous people ==
It was the birthplace of the author, poet and composer Antoine Fabre d'Olivet (December 8, 1767, – March 25, 1825, Paris).

== See also ==
- Communes of the Hérault department
