= Battle of Billot tower =

Battle of the War of the Camisards

- Part of the War of the Camisards
Date	29–30 April 1703
Location	Billot tower, Bagard 44°4′26″N 4°3′6″E
Result	Royalist victory

Belligerents
Kingdom of France	Camisards

Commanders and leaders
(Kingdom of France) Charles Barthélemy de Planque	Jean Cavalier; Salomon Couderc

Units involved
Irish Legion; Marine regiment Régiment Royal Comtois; Grenadiers	

Casualties and losses
30 dead, 36 wounded	134–170 dead
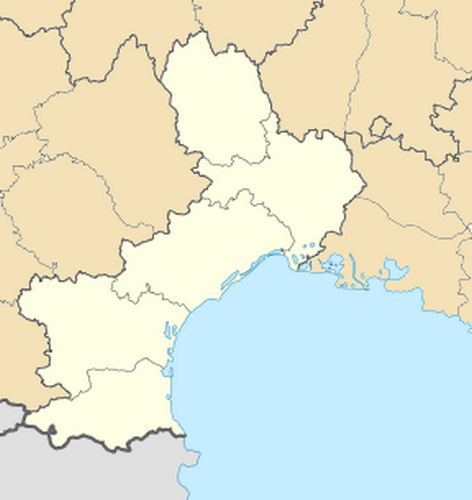
- Location within Occitanie Battle of Billot tower (Languedoc-Roussillon) Battle of Billot tower (France)

The battle of Billot tower took place in 1703, during the war of the Camisards, when Huguenot rebels led by Jean Cavalier were ambushed in Bagard by Royalist troops.

== Background ==
In late 1703, Camisard leader Jean Cavalier decided to launch an offensive against the Florentines, a Catholic militia mainly based in Saint-Florent-sur-Auzonnet, in response to Catholic attempts to suppress the Camisards. Teaming up with fellow rebel Salomon Couderc, he organized a troop of 1,200 men. Cavalier and his forces marched down to the Billot Tower, a castle located in the Bagard commune, between Alès and Anduze.

A nearby miller who overheard the plan sent a message to the marquis of Montrevel that thousands of Camisards had set up camp near the Billot tower. On the evening of 29 April Montrevel told his lieutenant-general, de Planque, to attack the rebels. Leaving Alès at 9:00 PM with 800 infantry and 200 dragoons, Cavalier encountered the Camisards at 11:00 PM.

== Battle ==
The advancing royalist regiments included Marines, Royal-Comtois, Irish Legion, a Swiss regiment, and many others. The dragoons were split into three columns as they crossed the Gardon river to get to the tower. Lieutenant-general de Planque arrived at a road near Anduze with 400 footmen as the third column passed through Sommières. De Planque's column was the first to see combat after it ambushed a band of Camisards near Vermagtet farm. A Protestant vanguard tried to slow the troops down but failed. Cavalier assembled 400 soldiers outside the castle's gate as others tried to get inside the structure. Cavalier led an assault on the gate as the battle grew stronger. Seeing the grenadiers retreating, the Camisards took the opportunity to evacuate the castle, leaving behind about forty people who they couldn't rescue. Cavalier attacked the gate two more times but was driven back by the castle's defenders. Somewhere between three and four o'clock in the morning, the Camisards fled the castle to Saint Bénezet. The remaining rebels kept up the fight for eight more hours until grenadiers set fire to the building with their grenade. Only three Camisards managed to survive; the others perished in the flames.

== Casualties ==
The attackers lost two captains, one a lieutenant and the other a second-lieutenant. Seven officers from the Irish Legion were wounded, 26 grenadiers killed and 29 soldiers were injured. According to government estimates, 134 Camisards were killed on the first day, and 300 more died during the burning of Billot tower. Jean Cavalier estimated he had lost around a hundred soldiers, additionally claiming that over 1,000 of the opposing side's soldiers had been killed or wounded. The historian Pierre Rolland described Cavalier's casualty estimates to be an exaggeration.

== Sources ==
- Cavalier, Jean (2011). Présentation et notes de Pierre Rolland - Mémoires du colonel Cavalier sur la guerre des camisards, manuscrit original de la Haye. Éditions de Paris. pp. 108–109.
