= Battle of Cauvi's farm =

Battle of Cauvi's Farm
- Part of the War of the Camisards
Date	24 December 1702 (324 years ago)
Location	Cauvi's farm, near Saint-Christol-lès-Alès 44°4′54.37″N 4°5′44.29″E
Result	Camisard victory

Belligerents
Kingdom of France	Camisards

Strength
500	60
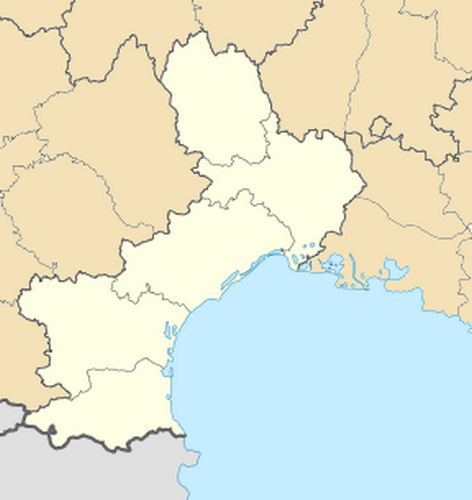
- Location within Languedoc-Roussillon

The battle of Cauvi's farm occurred on 24 December 1702, during the War of the Camisards when Huguenot leader Jean Cavalier routed Alès' governor at Saint-Christol-lez-Alès.

== Background ==
In July 1702, the Cévennes fell into civil war, as Protestant Huguenots called Camisards led an uprising against the regime of Louis XIV. On the night before 24 December, Jean Cavalier and his soldiers burned a church in Saint-Privat-des-Vieux, in the northeast of Alès. That dawn, Cavalier's Camisards fled to a plain, hiding in the vicinity of a local farmer named Cauvi (alternatively spelled Cauvy). Cavalier arranged for a religious assembly that the region's Protestants could attend.

== Battle ==
After seeing Saint-Privat's church in flames, the governor of Alès, Monsieur d'Aiguines, Gouverneur d'Alès, realized that Cavalier was attacking his territory, assembling an army composed of local militias from the nobility and a unit of dragoons. As the 500-strong troop made its way through the 5 km-long path to Cauvi's farm, a group of around fifty soldiers decided to go fight.

Jean Cavalier, after being alerted of M. d'Aiguines advancing army, organized his soldiers, which had only sixty people in them. Assisted by captain Esperandieu, he sent his best shooters to hide behind a mound of earth. The remaining soldiers stood in the plain, in full sight of the soldiers.

The advancing cavalry decided to ignore d'Aguines orders, launching a charge against the Camisards, only to be gunned down by a wave of snipers. Among those killed by the gunfire were the governor's aide-de-camp and the cavalry commander's horse. The cavalrymen fled the scene, trampling over the infantry as they ran. d'Aiguines forces fled in disorder to the Château de Montmoirac.

== Aftermath ==
The first major Camisard victory, it heavily motivated the Huguenots and gave them a sense of pride in the Camisard cause. The next day Jean Cavalier was elected chief of the group.

The bodies of the people killed in the battle have been buried in the location close to where they died.

Saint-Christol-lez-Alès has become a deeply important site for French Protestants due to the battle's symbolism.

== Bibliography ==
- Jean Cavalier, présentation et notes de Pierre Rolland (2011). Mémoires du colonel Cavalier sur la guerre des camisards, manuscrit original de la Haye. Éditions de Paris. Cavalier..
- Chabrol, Jean-Paul; Mauduy, Jacques (2013). Atlas des Camisards, 1521-1789 les Huguenots, une résistance obstinée. Nîmes: Alcide. pp. 133, 240. ISBN 9782917743492..
- Chabrol, Jean-Paul; Vezon, Thierry (2017). Alès, Capitale des Cévennes. Nîmes: Alcide. pp. 55–56, 142. ISBN 978-2-37591-012-2..
