= Saint-André-de-Lancize =

- Commune
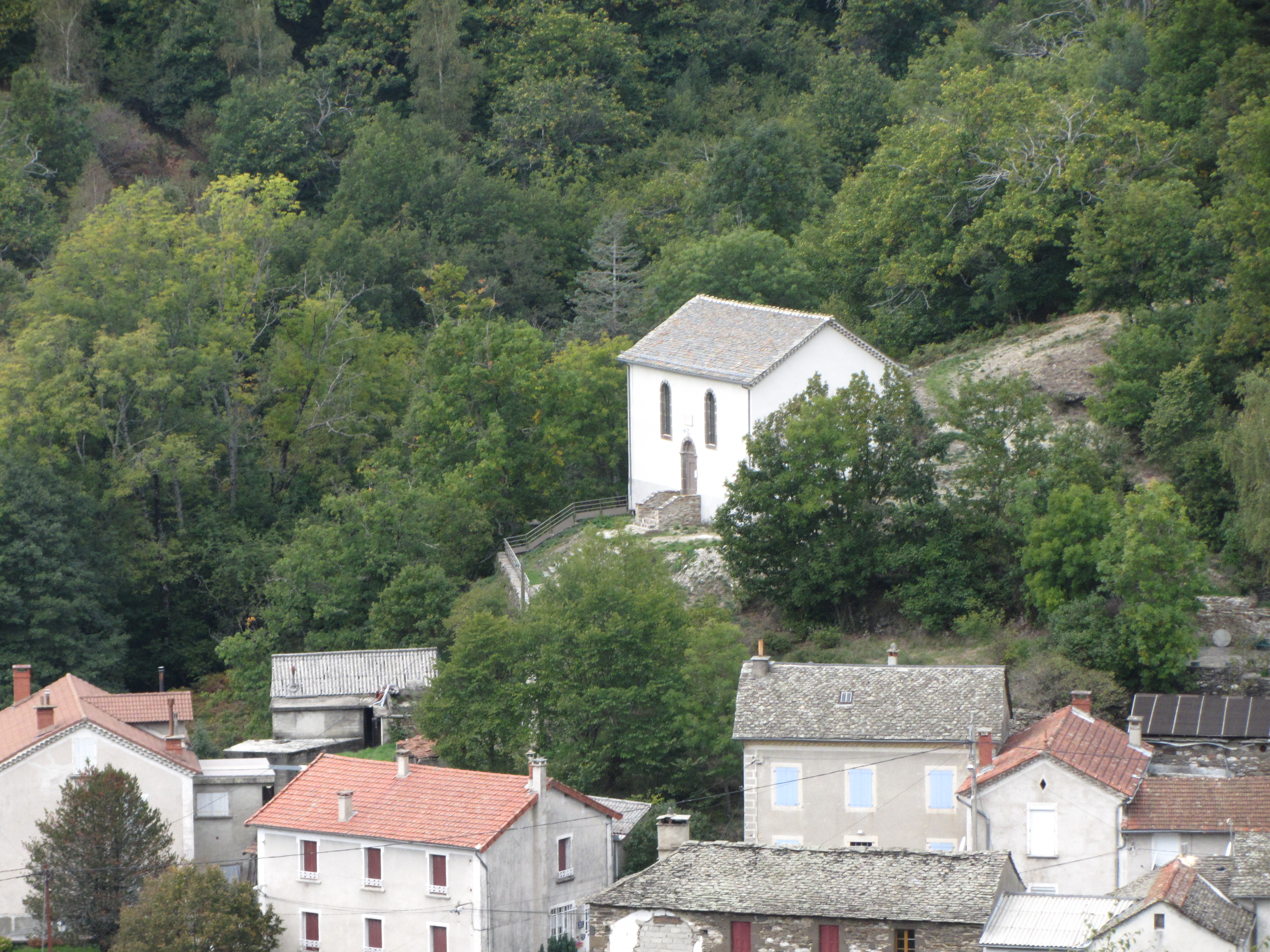
- The temple of Rouve Bas: today desacralized, it is now a memorial devoted to the Camisard war in Bougès mountains (Cévennes)
- Location of Saint-André-de-Lancize
- Location within France Location within Occitanie
- Coordinates: 44°15′32″N 3°48′40″E
- Country: France
- Region: Occitania
- Department: Lozère
- Arrondissement: Florac
- Canton: Le Collet-de-Dèze
- Intercommunality: CC des Cévennes au Mont Lozère

Government
  - Mayor (2020–2026): Florence Baï
- Area^{1}: 22.78 km^{2} (8.80 sq mi)
- Elevation: 700 m (2,300 ft)
- Highest elevation: 1,351 m (4,432 ft)
- Lowest elevation: 376 m (1,234 ft)
- Population (2023): 151
  - Density: 6.63/km^{2} (17.2/sq mi)
- Time zone: UTC+01:00 (CET)
  - Summer (DST): UTC+02:00 (CEST)
- INSEE/Postal code: 48136 /48240
- ^{1} French Land Register data, which excludes lakes, ponds, glaciers > 1 km^{2} (0.386 sq mi or 247 acres) and river estuaries.

Saint-André-de-Lancize (French pronunciation: [sɛ̃.t‿ɑ̃dʁe də lɑ̃siz]; Occitan: Sent Andrieu) is a commune in the Lozère department in southern France.

== History ==
History of the commune is mainly marked by the Camisards revolt, which started on 22 July 1702 in Vieljouves, a hamlet located above the village of Le Rouve. On the same evening, upon invitation by Salomon and David Couderc, two brothers living in Le Rouve, a group gathered around the woolcomber Abraham Mazel, a "prophet", who received a "divine" inspiration giving him the instruction to deliver huguenots made prisoners and tortured by François Langlade, the abbé of Chayla at Pont-de-Montvert. The following Sunday was devoted to mobilize people who were volunteers to release prisoners. On 24 July, fifty men, armed with some guns, axes and scythes, gathered on top of Bougès mountain, at a site named "Les treis Faus" or "Les trois fayards" (meaning "Three beeches" in Occitan and French language, respectively). On the same evening, around 10 AM, they entered Pont-de-Montvert while singing a psalm. They asked, as their only claim, to liberate prisoners. Upon refusal, they liberated them by force, in the course of a violent fight where François Langlade died. So went the Camisards war, also called war of the Cévennes, which later on extended to the whole Cévennes area, and lasted two years.

== Places and monuments ==
The temple of Rouve-Bas, now desacralized and renovated by the commune, houses a place of memory dedicated to the Camisard insurrection in the Bougès (Cévennes) massif.

The place of memory is accessible to visitors (however, due to the configuration of the land, the place of memory is not accessible to people with reduced mobility) on Tuesday and Saturday from 3 to 6 PM from 15 June till 15 September.

The visitor will find:

- the projection of an audio-visual montage dedicated to the war of the Camisards.
- an exhibition of documents (facsimiles) in three categories:
  - documents showing the theme of the projection, tracing the difficulties then incurred by the Protestants and the Camisard War itself.
  - documents on the very local implications of these events.
  - documents evoking some recent or current situations of resistance to oppression.
  - a loan library of historical books and novels about themes dear to the association in charge of the place of memory: freedom of conscience, tolerance, open-mindedness, with a youth department.

The guests are available to the public and books related to the Camisard War are offered for sale.

Evening and day-time entertainment takes place every year during the summer.

== See also ==
- Communes of the Lozère department
