= War of the Camisards =

1704 uprising of Protestant peasants in France

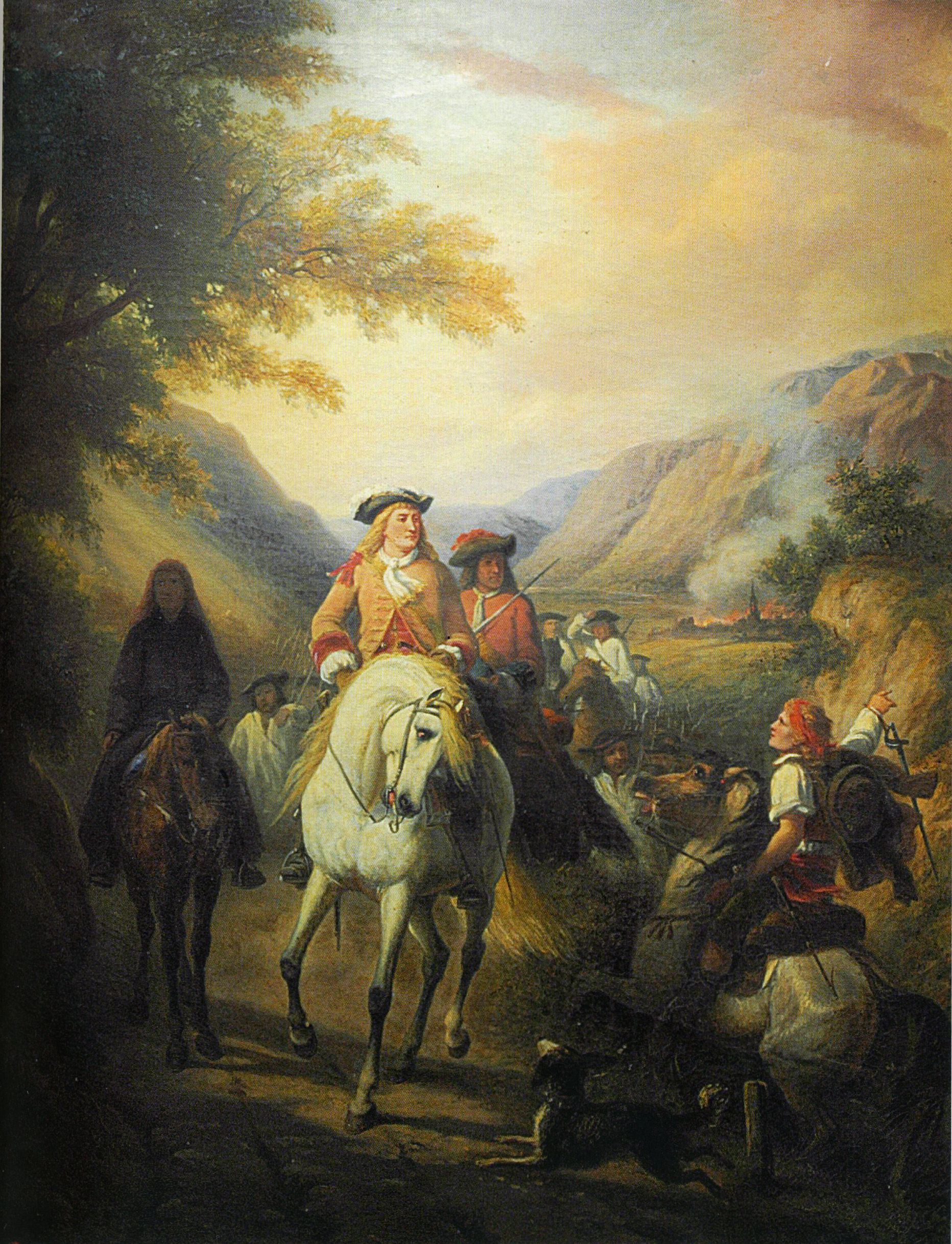
- Jean Cavalier, chief camisard, painting by Pierre-Antoine Labouchère, 1864.
Date	July 24, 1702 – 1710
Location	Cévennes
Result	Government victory

Belligerents
France	Camisards

Commanders and leaders
Louis XIV; Nicolas de Lamoignon de Basville; Victor-Maurice de Broglie; Nicolas Auguste, maréchal de Montrevel; Claude Louis Hector de Villars Duke of Berwick	Jean Cavalier; Roland Laporte †; Abraham Mazel †; Abdias Maurel †; Esprit Séguier; Henri Castanet; Jean La Rose Gédéon Laporte

Strength
20,000 riflemen and dragoons (March 1703) 3,000 Miquelets (January 1703) 2,000–3,000 militiamen	7,500–10,000

Casualties and losses
	3,000 to 4,000 dead

The War of the Camisards (French: guerre des Camisards) or the Cévennes War (French: guerre des Cévennes) was an uprising of Protestant peasants known as Camisards in the Cévennes and Languedoc during the reign of Louis XIV. The uprising was a response to the Edict of Fontainebleau in 1685.

== Background ==
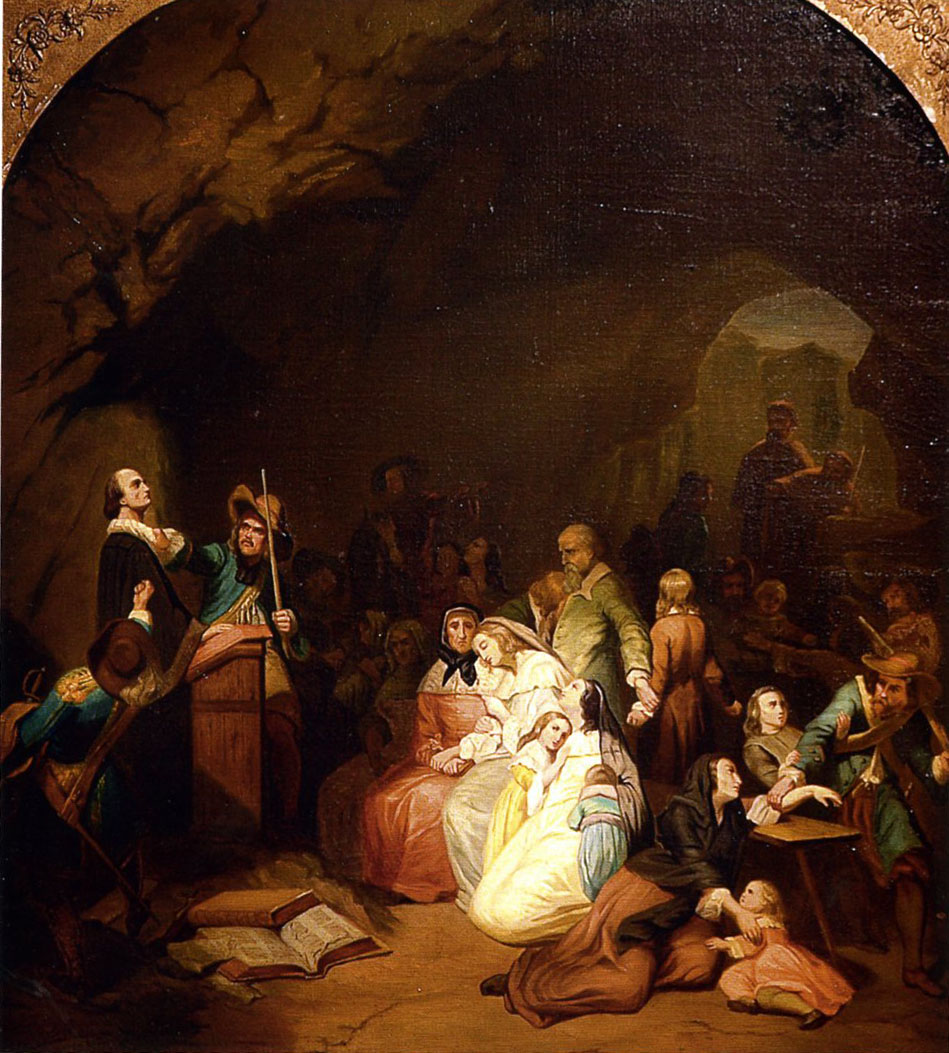
L'Assemblée surprise, painting by Karl Girardet, 1842.

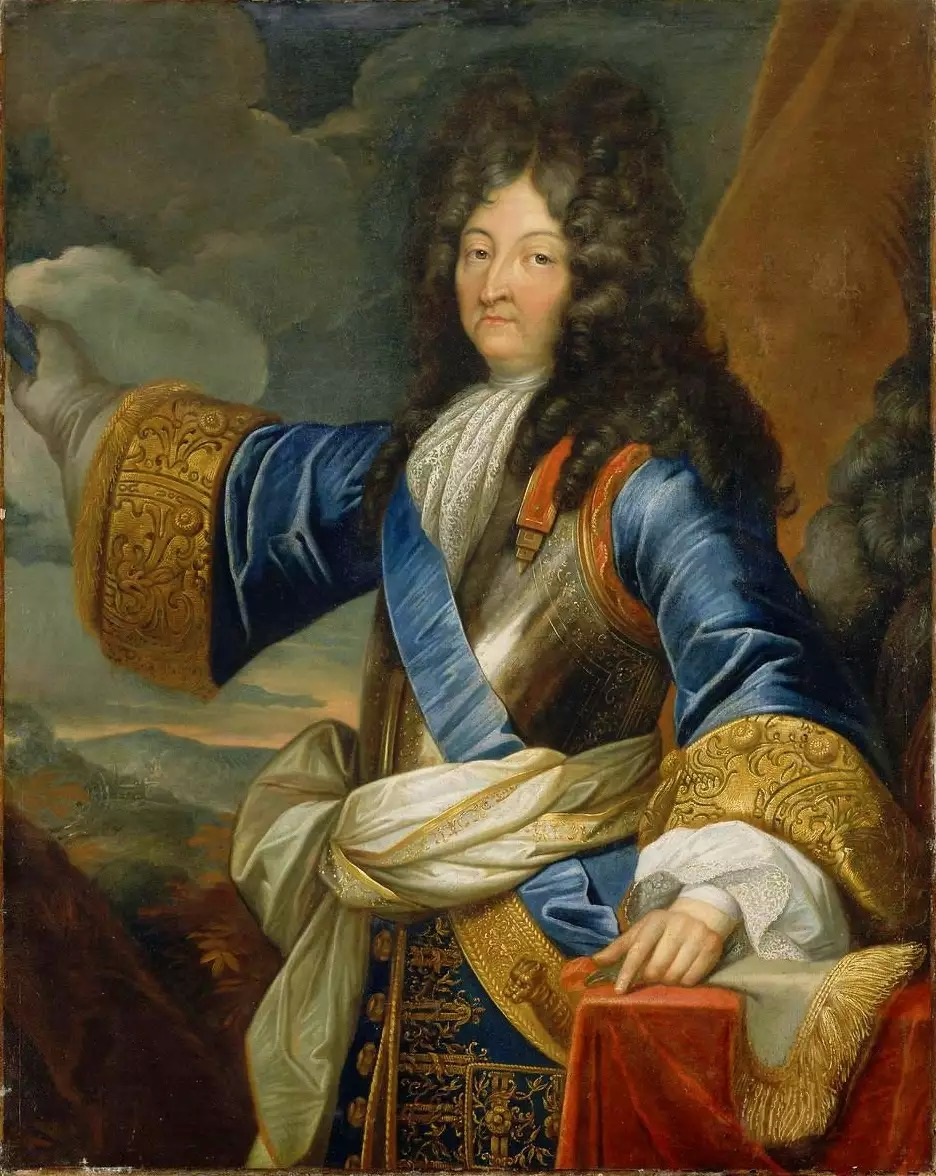
Louis XIV of France, Sun King

The war in the Cévennes originated from the edict of Fontainebleau, signed by King Louis XIV on October 18, 1685. The law revoked the edict of Nantes, which had granted religious freedom and civil rights to the country's Protestant minority. The edict of Fontaineblue banned Protestantism from the country. In the provinces which the largest Protestant (or Huguenot) minorities, Huguenots were converted by force to Catholicism in what is now known as the dragonnades, which took place in the Cévennes as early as 1683. This persecution was strongest in Poitou, Guyenne, the Dauphiné, and Languedoc, where reformist ideas took root from 1530 to 1560. Many Huguenots decided to flee the country, while others opted to practice their faith in secret. "New Converts" (or NC) were employed by the French monarchy to monitor and suppress the Protestant faith.

Since late October 1685, Huguenots held "desert assemblies" in an attempt to continue following their religion, but countermeasures against Protestants strengthened since authorities used fines, sequestrated properties, military force, and took hostages as punishments. Reconversion to Protestantism was treated as a significant crime. People charged with it were often executed, tortured with breaking wheels, or sentenced to penal labour. Children were forcibly taken from their families and sent to Catholic ones.

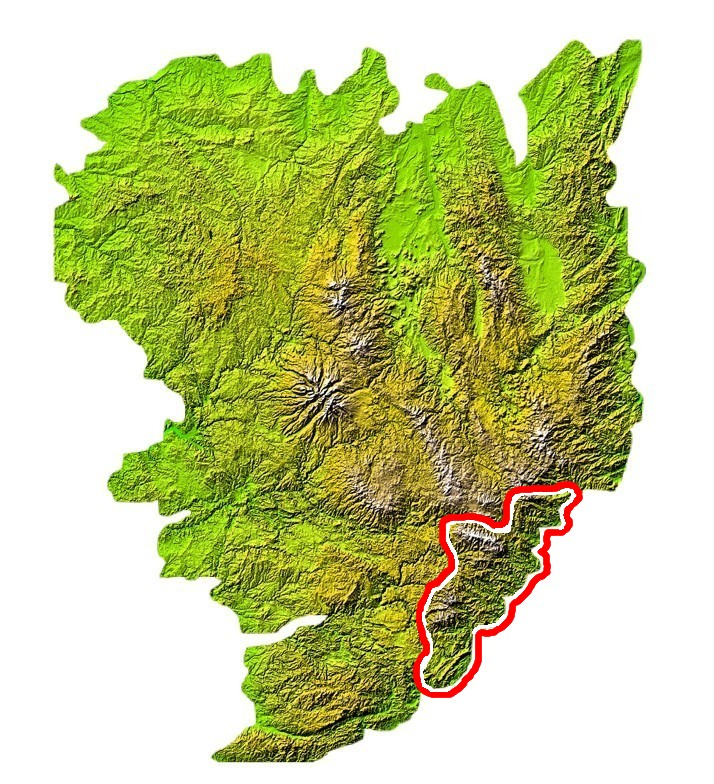
Location of the Cévennes in the Massif Central. The Cévennes are circled around in red.

In the Cévennes, Nicolas de Lamoignon de Basville ordered the execution of 84 people, sentenced fifty to the galleys and deported 300 people to the New World in 1686 and 1687. While the desert assemblies continued, a new crisis came along in 1701, when the Kingdom of France intervened in the War of the Spanish Succession.

== Beginning ==
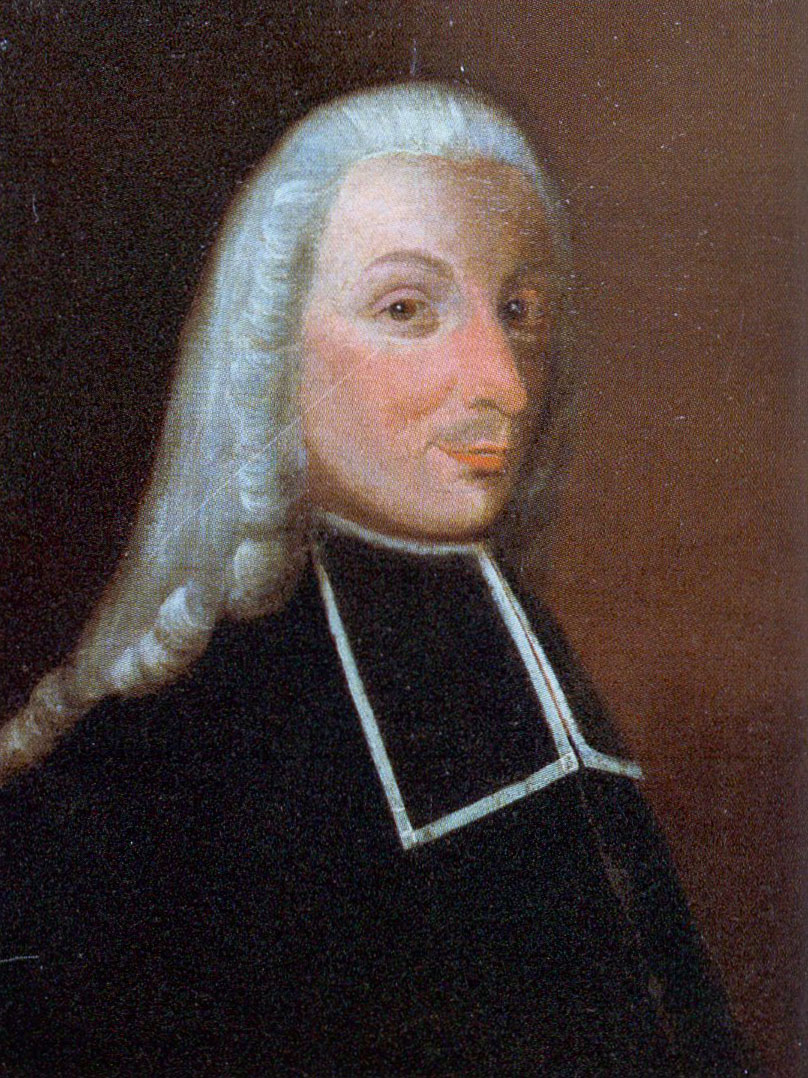
Abbot François de Langlade du Chayla.

On July 24, 1702, about sixty armed men led by Abraham Mazel entered the village of Pont-de-Montvert as they sang a psalm. The group demanded that the abbot and political figure François de Langlade du Chayla release Protestant prisoners from the jail. They were told to wait. As the men stood outside, somebody shot one of them. The enraged mob broke through the doors of the structure, freeing the prisoners before they set the building on fire. Chayla was hunted down and killed as he tried to escape through the window. The abbot's murder sparked the beginning of the Cévennes war.

During the aftermath of the attack, several Huguenot bands formed led by Protestant "prophets". The bands committed reprisal attacks against priests and Catholics. Lieutenant-general Victor-Maurice de Broglie, commander of the Royal troops in Languedoc ordered Captain Poul to crack down on the rebellion, but with little success. Despite general failures, Huguenot rebel Gédéon Laporte was slain later in that year's October.

Not all Protestants supported the Camisards, including the population of Fraissinet-de-Lozère. Despite their loyalty, many of them lost their property in the Great Burning of the Cévennes in late 1703.

== The Camisards ==
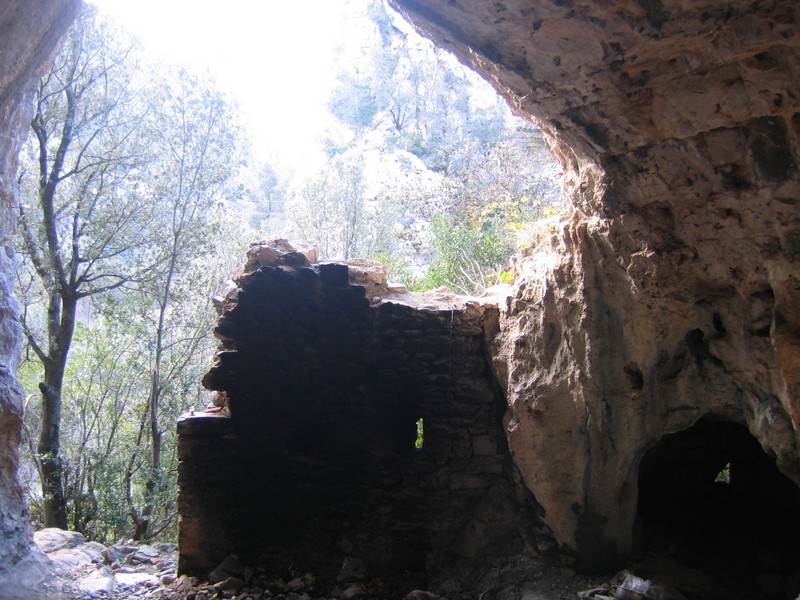
Cave in Saint-Julien-de-la-Nef used by Camisards as a base for operations.

Starting in January 1703, Protestant guerillas, (dubbed as "fanatics" by Royals), became gradually referred to as Camisards. Several bands were organized, led by Jean Cavalier, who headed a group of 700 men, appointing the lieutenants Rastelet, Abdias Maurel, Ravanel, Bonbonnoux and Claris. Pierre Laporte, nicknamed Rolland, commanded 300 to 400 men who were later joined by 50-100 rebels under the lead of Abraham Mazel. Nicolas Jouanny led 300-400 men in the Bougès mountains. Castanet led a small band in Mount Aigoual. There were numerous other Camisard leaders, notably Salomon Couderc.

The Camisards were mainly composed of peasants, usually sheep-farmers between 20 and 25 years old. Geographically, the insurrection commenced in the Bougès mountain range, situated along the southeastern edges of what is now the departement of Lozère (Hautes-Cévennes) but then spread to the territory that is now Gard (Basses-Cévennes). The exception to this was a territory roughly corresponding to the east of a line from Nîmes to Barjac and north of Génolhac and Saint-Ambroix. The current arrondissement of Le Vigan, and most of the area west of Aulas were not touched.

Camisards held their own pious gatherings, which have been noted for their intensity and deep religiosity. Camisards were supported by local Protestant peasants in the Cévennes, which made warfare easier.

== The royal forces ==
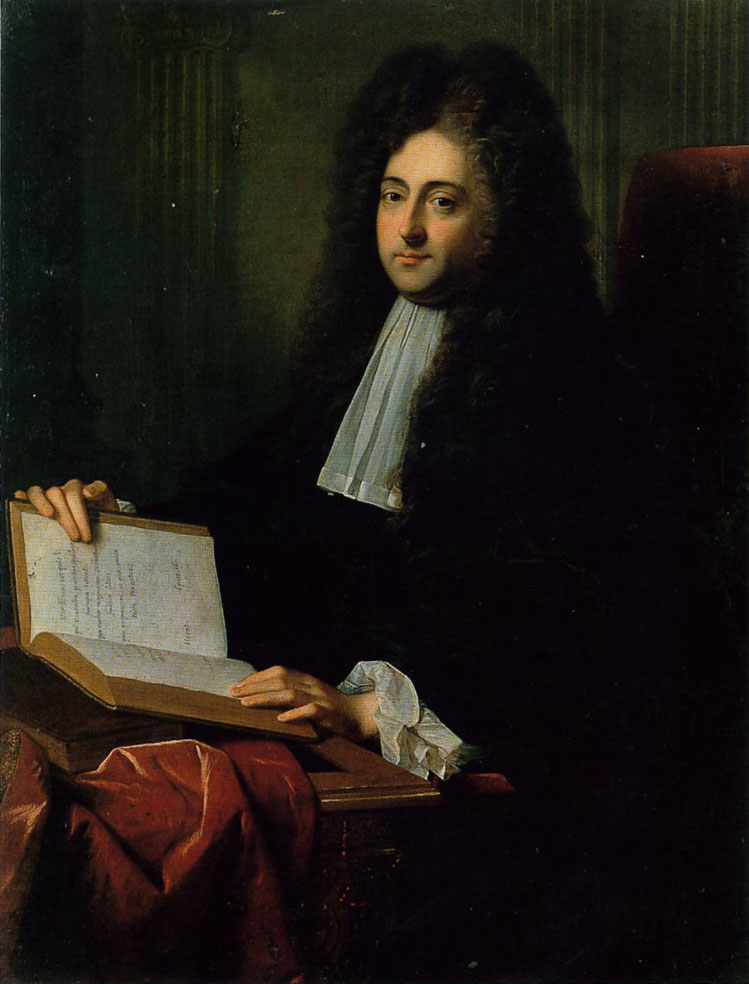
Nicolas de Lamoignon de Basville

The royal troops, who were opposed to the Camisards, were commanded by lieutenant-general Victor-Maurice de Broglie managed to assemble 20,000 soldiers, fusiliers and dragoons by March 1703. Many Catholic parishes organized pro-government militias, forming groups such as the "Florentins" or "White Camisards", which held 200-700 people. 200-300 men from the Vaunage joined a militia known as the "free company of the partisans".

1,500 to 2,000 people from the Uzège were enrolled in the "Cadets of the Cross." The militia became infamous for acts of brutality during the war.

== Timeline ==
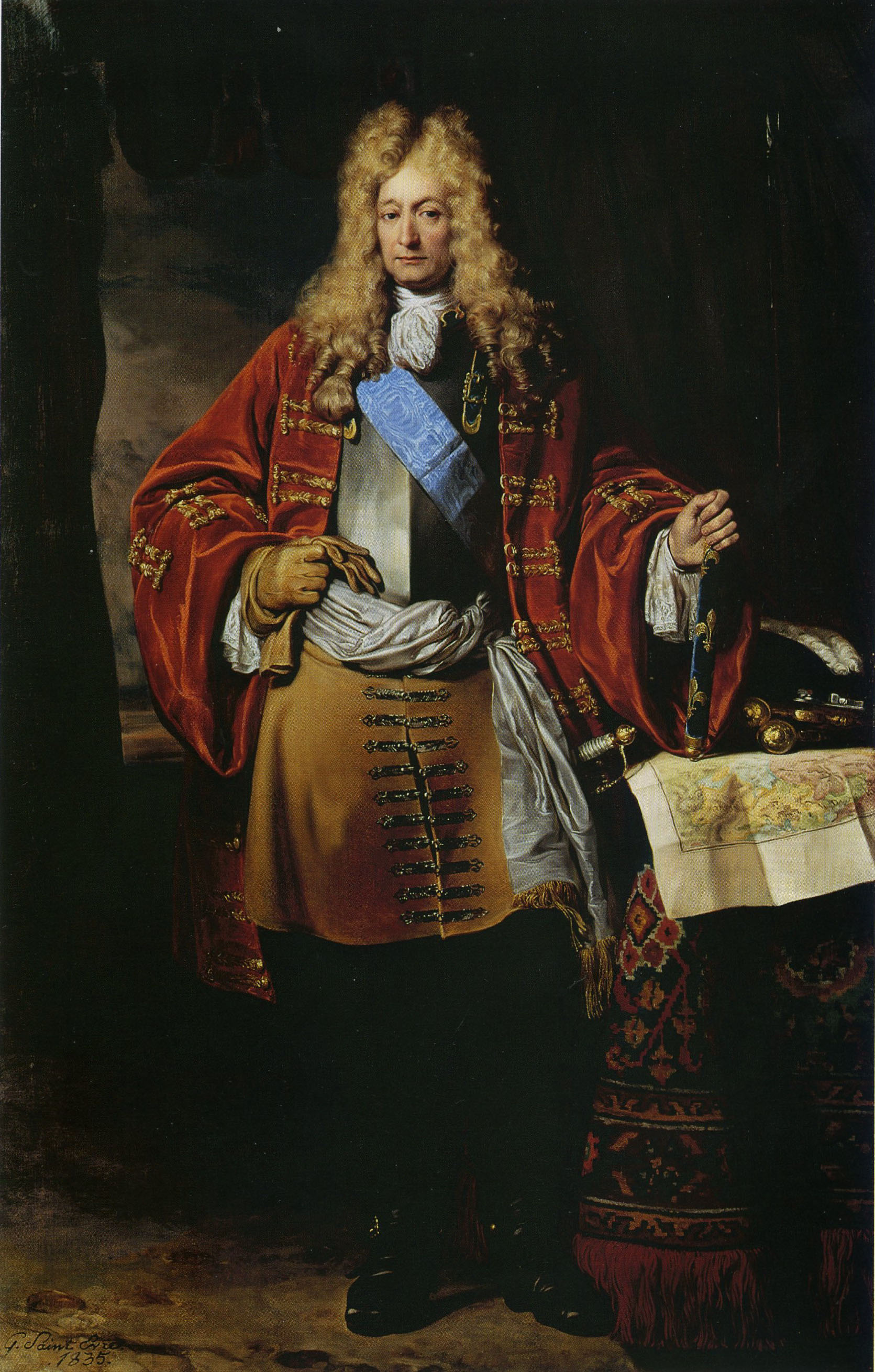
Nicolas Auguste de La Baume de Montrevel, by Saint-Evre Gillot, 1835.

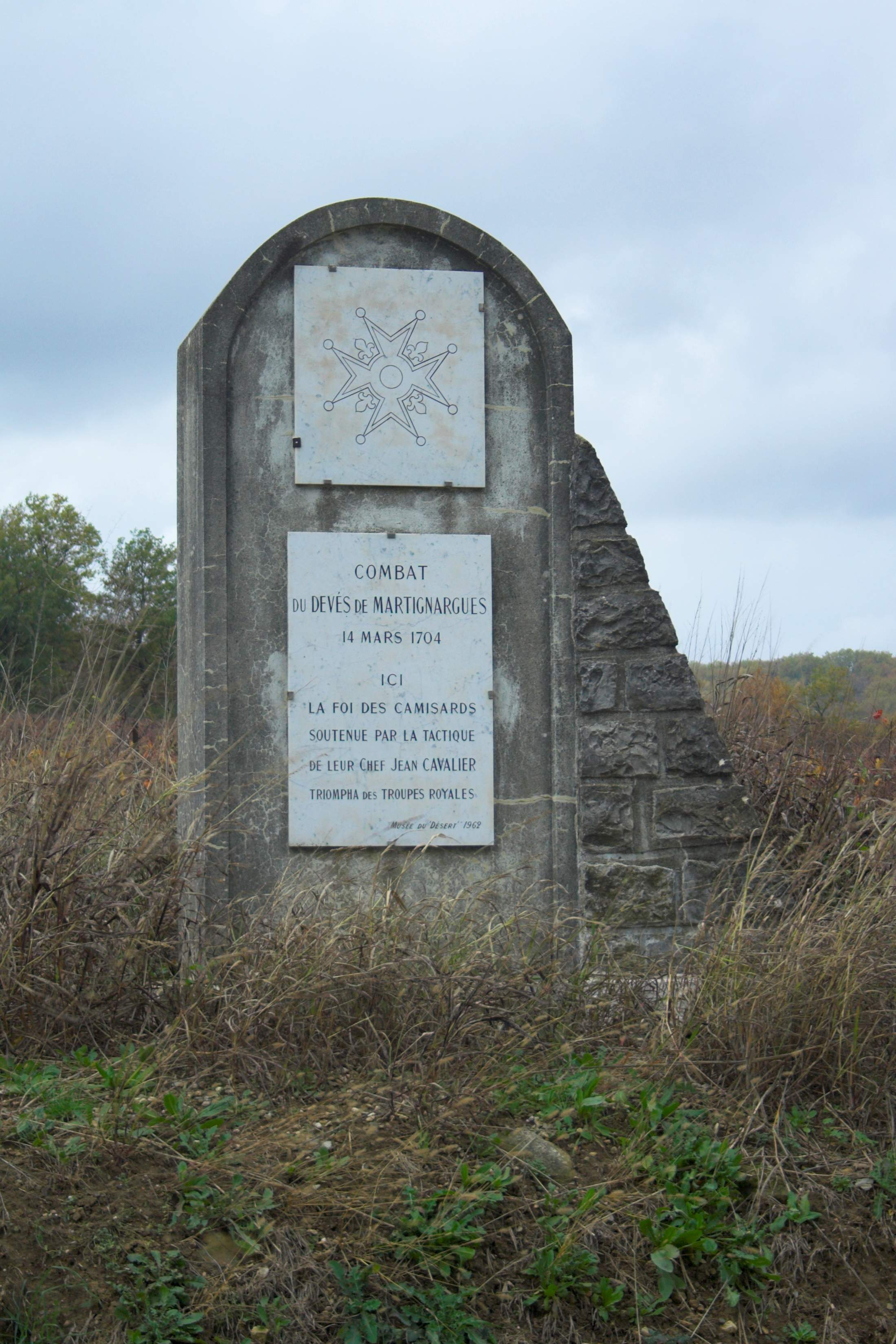
Monument commemorating the Camisard victory in Martignargues.

During the months that followed, the Cévennes became the site of numerous battles, skirmishes, clashes, and ambushes between Camisards and Royalists. The Protestant rebels employed some of the earliest tactics of guerilla warfare against the Royalists, and Captain Poul was slain on January 12. During their campaign, Camisards assassinated Catholic priests as they burnt down villages. At Fraissinet-de-Fourques, 40 women and children of Royalist forces were murdered by Castanet's troops on February 21, 1703. French forces went on to respond with harsh reprisals.

On January 14, 1703, marshal Nicolas Auguste de La Baume de Montrevel, replaced the Count of Broglie and was placed in command of the Royal army, hiring 3,000 miquelets. On February 25, the king granted Montrevel and Nicolas de Lamoignon de Basville total control over the military. Surrendering Camisards holding their hands in the air were summarily executed via the gallows and the breaking wheel, at times even burned at the stake. Huguenot villages were razed to the ground and all their property confiscated.

After a snowstorm in February 1703, French officer Jacques de Jullien won a major victory against Cavalier's troops. He was promoted by Louis XIV for his actions. Jullien embarked on a campaign to destroy all the resources of the Caminards. Royal troops burned Protestant and pro-Camanard towns and villages to the ground as their inhabitants were massacred and deported. Jullien made an effort not to let the war come under the public scrutiny of foreign nations. He was especially concerned about possible extensions to Switzerland and Savoy.

On the first of April, Palm Sunday, the marshal of Montrevel ambushed and massacred twenty Huguenot civilians at Nîmes in what is now known as the Moulin de l'Agau massacre). That month, government forces attacked the settlements of Mialet (Laporte's hometown) and Saumane. After the population refused to cease assisting the rebels, Montrevel expelled the villages' entire populations.

On September 20 the Catholic settlements of Saturargues and Saint-Sériès were attacked by Protestants. 71 people, comprising 60 Saturarguois and 11 Saint-Sériains, were killed in total.

Huguenots refugees who had fled abroad, the Marquis of Miremont in particularly, tried to convince the English and Dutch, who were at war with France, to land troops in the country to support the Camisards. English and Dutch warships approached the coast near Sète, but Montrevel took them as a serious threat, and had the coast monitored, ending the attempted intervention.

The royal troops remained in check. In September, Basville decided to depopulate the Cévennes in order to isolate the Camisards and prevent them from getting vital foods and resources in what is known as the burning of the Cévennes. Basville's plan, approved by the king, outlined 31 parishes designated to have their populations expelled. Their 13,212 inhabitants were ordered to flee with all their cattle and furniture to government-guarded cities. The plan was carried out from September to December 1703 as French troops and militias burned down and massacred at least 466 towns in the Cévennes. All 31 parishes were successfully destroyed. Florentine militiamen were responsible for numerous murders and atrocities against civilians during the operation. Support for the Camisards skyrocketed after the Burning of the Cévennes, providing a major propaganda boost for the Huguenot cause and an increase of the conflict's intensity. As French authorities unsuccessfully attempted to maintain stability, Catholic militias responded to the insurgency with brutal anti-Protestant reprisals.

On March 14, 1704, 1,100 Camisards commanded by Jean Cavalier won their greatest victory, 400-600 elite members of the navy and 60 dragoons were routed in Martignargues; between 180 and 350 royal soldiers died while Camisard losses numbered 20. Louis XIV responded by dismissing Montrevel and replaced him with marshal Claude Louis Hector de Villars.

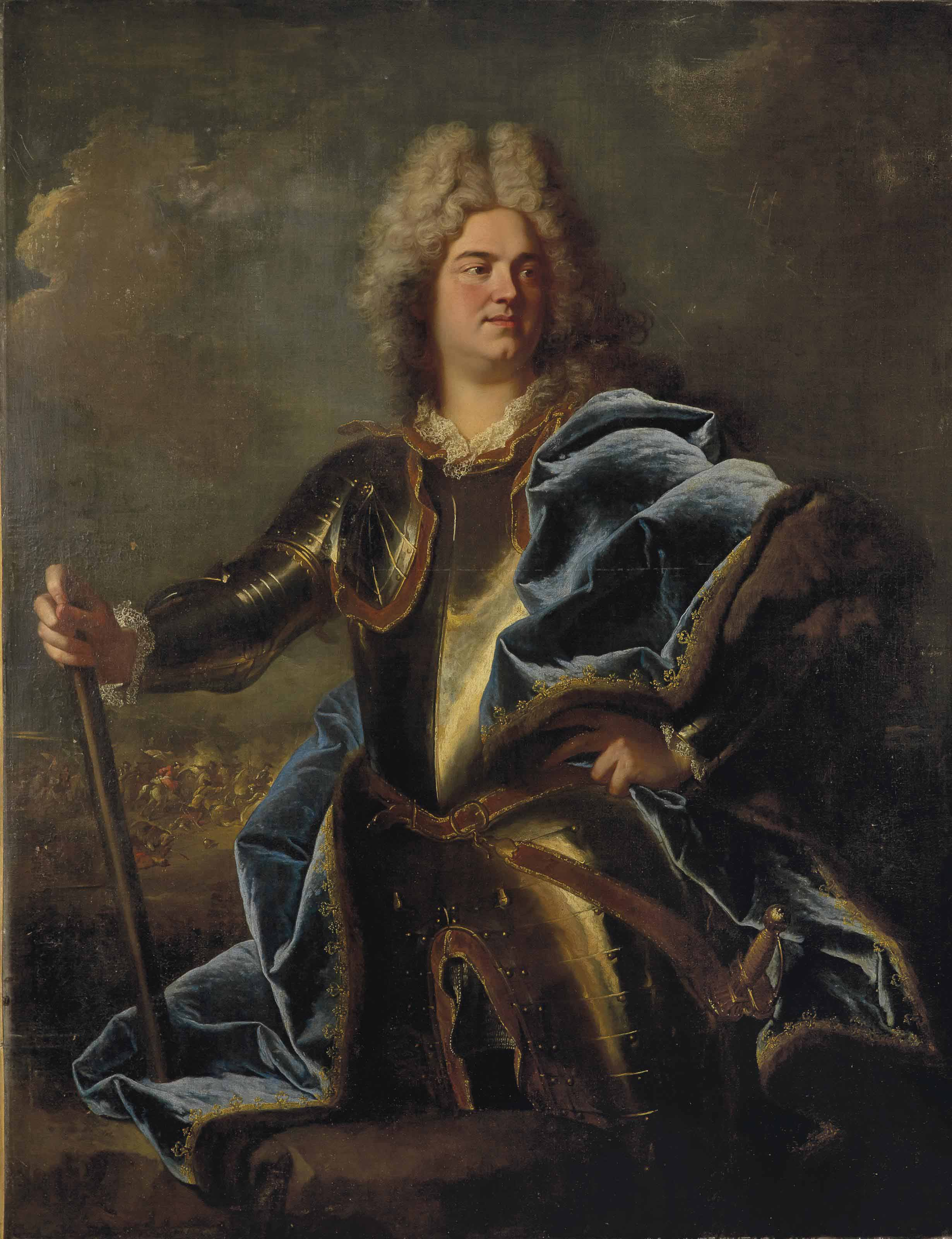
Claude Louis Hector de Villars, painting by Hyacinthe Rigaud.

In April, 150 peasants were massacred by the government at Branoux-les-Taillades in Saint-Paul-la-Coste.

On April 19, two days before his departure, Montrevel and an army of 1,000 men defeated Cavalier and seized his headquarters. On April 30, Jean Cavalier began negotiating with the king.

== End of the war ==
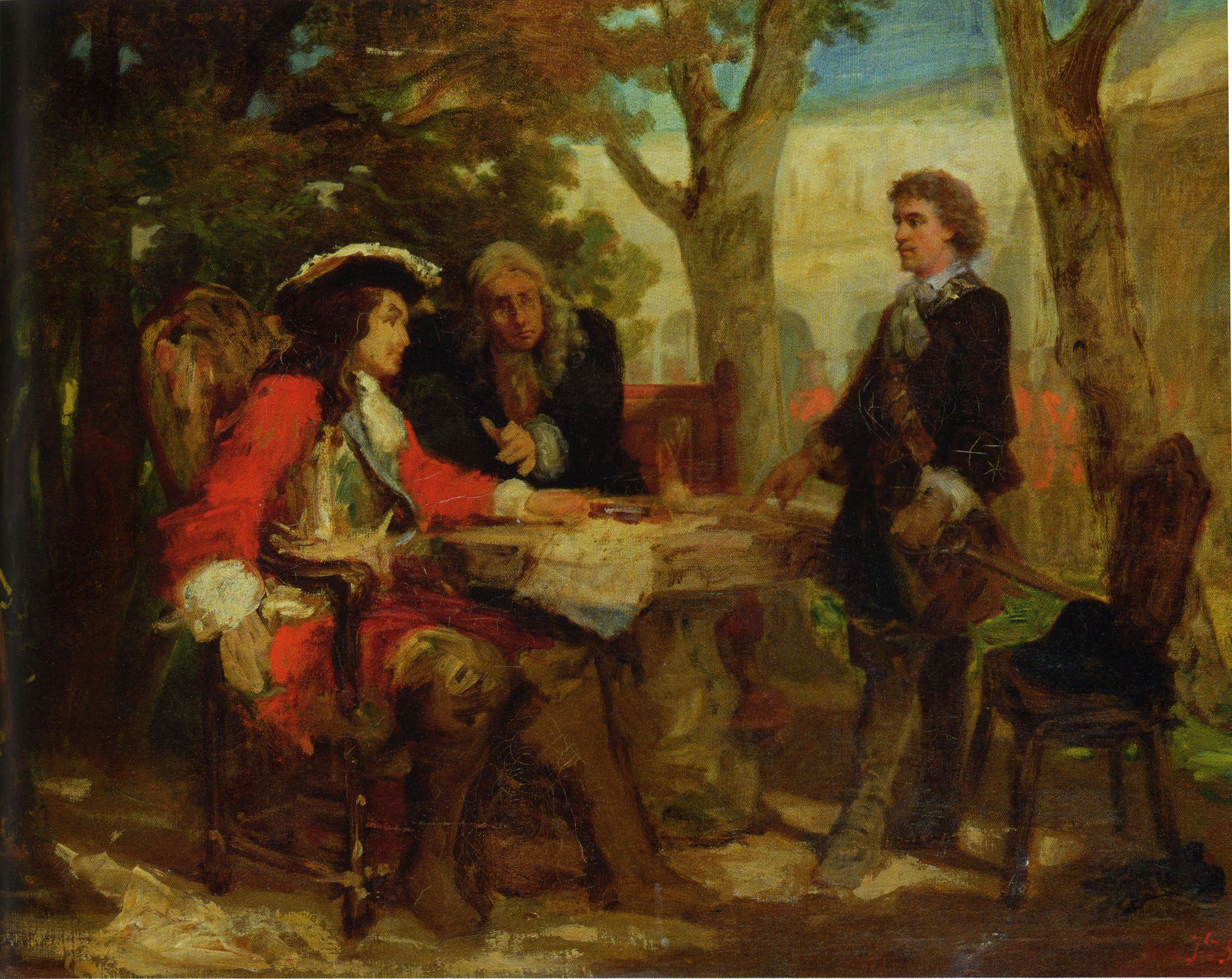
Entrevue du maréchal de Villars et de Jean Cavalier à Nîmes, le 16 mai 1704 (painting by Jules Salles, c. 1865.

On May 16, Cavalier met with marshal Claude Louis Hector de Villars in Nîmes. Cavalier promised a surrender on the grounds that he and his men would be given amnesty and the right to leave the country. He also demanded that Camasard prisoners be released. On May 27 the king accepted the offer and a truce was declared. Cavalier would leave France with 100 of his men on June 23. The edict of Fountainebleu was not revoked, and Protestants remained a persecuted minority.

Cavalier's capitulation was received poorly by other Camisards, especially Pierre Laporte, who opted to continue fighting.

In late June, English and Dutch warships led a botched naval expedition into the Gulf of Lion. The operation failed due to poor weather and storms.

Now with Cavalier's men having joined him, Laporte now commanded 1,200 men. Betrayed, Laporte died in his house on August 13, 1704, in Castelnau-Valence. From September to October, Castanet, Jouany, Couderc, Rose and Mazel surrendered one by one. They were given permission to leave France and took refuge in Switzerland.

In December 1704, the last Camisards had been defeated by Villars, marking the end of the uprising. Villars left the Cévennes and handed over control to James FitzJames, 1st Duke of Berwick. Sporadic bouts of instability continued until 1710.

== Post-war unrest ==
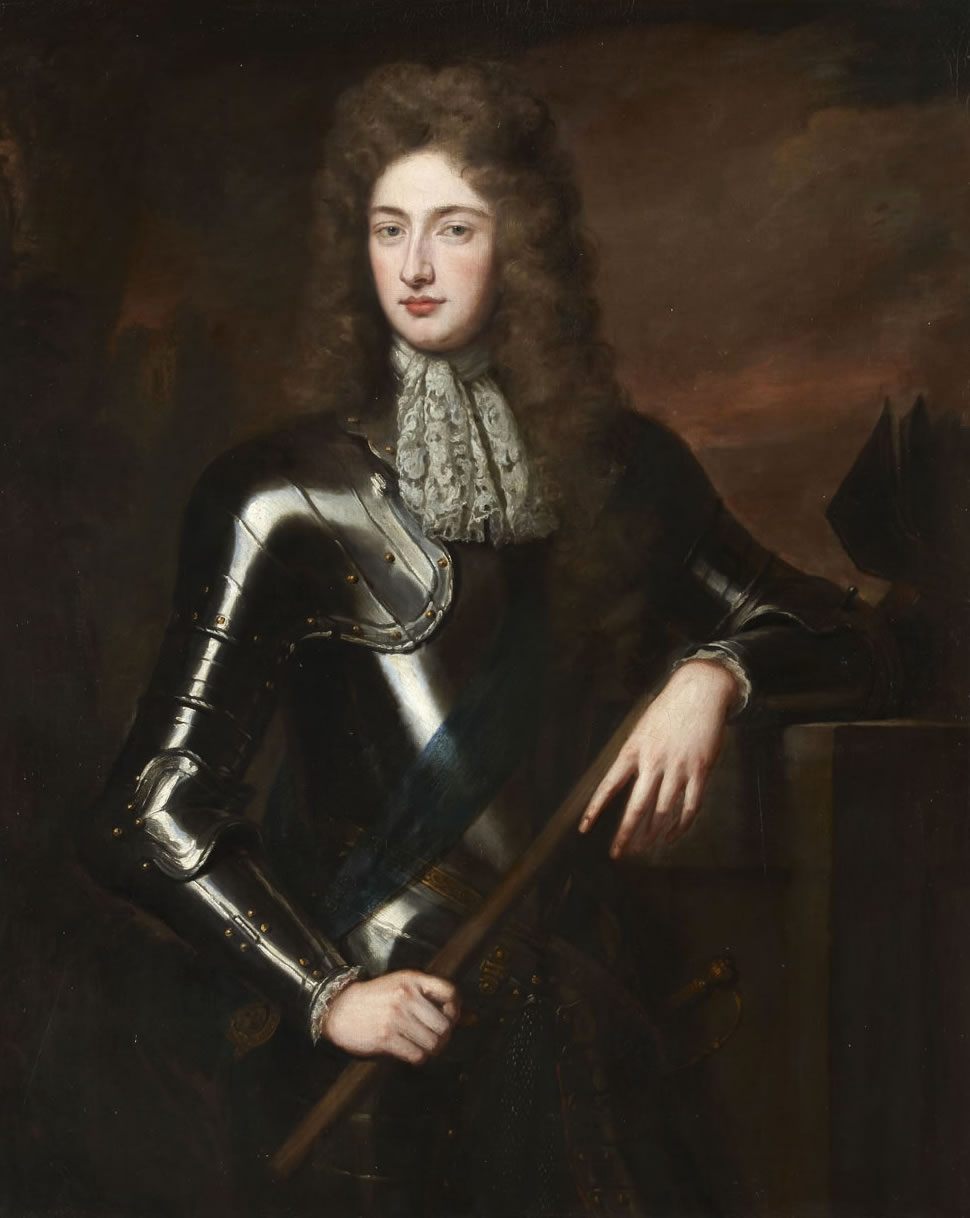
A portrait of James FitzJames, 1st Duke of Berwick

Even though the war had ceased, Ravanel and Claris refused to submit. They were joined in by Mazel who helped organize pro-Huguenot movements. Mazel was finally arrested in 1705. Many Camisard leaders who had fled abroad, including Catinat, Castanet and Élie Marion returned to France where they continued the uprising. They were rapidly hunted down and executed soon after. Castanet was captured in Montpellier in March 1705, where he was brutally beaten.

In April 1705, a Protestant from Genève named Vilas teamed up with Catinat and Ravanel, helping form the "league of the children of God." The League planned to kidnap the Duke of Berwick and Nicolas de Lamoignon and capture Sète where they would allow troops of the Grand Alliance land. From there they would repeat a new revolt in the Cévennes.

The plot was foiled and the French authorities arrested one hundred people. Thirty people were sentenced to death. Vilas was beaten to death by executioners, while Castanet and Ravanel were burned alive. Salomon Couderc perished on the stake a month later.

Jean Cavalier later assembled a new regiment made up of Camisards who fought for the Grand Alliance against France during the War of the Spanish Succession. Cavalier's fortunes took a turn for the worse on April 25, 1707, during the battle of Almansa, when Bourbon troops defeated a Grand Alliance army, which included his regiment. Cavalier was seriously wounded and escaped to England, ending his military career.

Abraham Mazel escaped his prison in July 1705 and fled to England. Mazel returned to his home country in 1709 to lead a new British-backed insurrection. A hundred men with Mazel at their helm, told France to restore the edict of Nantes and free Camisard prisoners who had been captured during the war. The revolt was crushed by French authorities.

Mazel refused to stop fighting for the Huguenot cause. In 1710 he organized a British-backed invasion of the country, but after landing at Sète in June, the invaders were quickly forced to withdraw by royal forces. Mazel was taken prisoner and finally killed on October 4, 1710, in the city of Uzès. Claris was beaten to death in October and Jouany was executed the next year.

In 1713, the Kingdom of France signed a peace treaty with the Kingdom of Great Britain, marking the beginning of the end of the War of the Spanish Succession. At the request of Queen Anne, Louis XIV pardoned 136 Huguenot galley slaves imprisoned for their faith, allowing them to seek exile in England.

The persecution of Huguenots came to an end in the 1787 Edict of Versailles. Signed by Louis XVI, the son of Nicolas de Lamoignon, Chrétien-François de Lamoignon de Bâville, attended the ceremony and had helped to issue the new law.

== Casualties ==
According to the historian Pierre Rolland, of the estimated 7,500 to 10,000 Camisards who took part in the war, at least 2,000 died in action, and at least 1,000 were summarily executed. 200 people were executed via trial, including by hanging, breaking wheel and immolation. An additional 2,000 Camisards were imprisoned or conscripted into the army. 200 became galley slaves. 1,000 to 1,200 had surrendered in 1704, many of which fled to exile in Switzerland.

In his 1718 report, Mémoire sur l'état présent des affaires de Languedoc, Nicolas de Lamoignon de Basville estimated over 14,000 people had died during the War of the Camisards.

The Huguenot population suffered heavy losses. The guerilla warfare employed by rebels and the extreme support that it received from local peasants resulted in France's need to suppress the local population. French regulars and militiamen were responsible for numerous massacres of Protestants in France during the war. Historian Catherine Randall described French atrocities as a form of ethnic cleansing. While Elizabeth Williams from Oklahoma State University agreed that Huguenots had been "perhaps the most brutally persecuted Protestants of the early modern era", she criticizes the narrative of the war as an ethnic cleansing.

Camisards were also guilty of atrocities. Catholic priest and historian Jean Rouquette listed the names of 471 recorded different civilians who were killed by the Camisards.

== See also ==
- Dragonnades
- French wars of religion
- Guerilla warfare
- Le Musée du Désert
