= Psalmody Abbey =

Abbey in Gard, France

Coordinates: 43°38′07″N 4°11′46″E

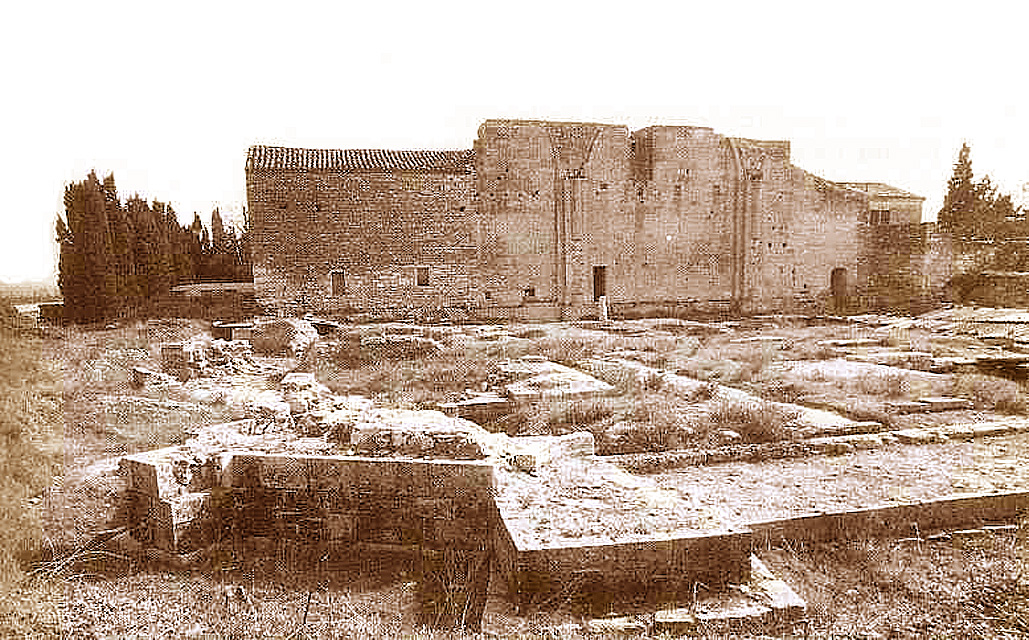
Abbey ruins

Psalmody Abbey, also Psalmodie Abbey or Psalmodi Abbey (French: Abbaye de Psalmody, Psalmodi or Psalmodie; Occitan: Abbaye de Psalmòdia), was a Benedictine abbey located near Saint-Laurent-d'Aigouze in the Camargue, in the department of Gard and the region of Languedoc-Roussillon in the south of France. It was destroyed in 1703.

== History ==
Psalmody Abbey was founded in the 5th century by monks from the Abbey of St. Victor, Marseille.

The new monastery acquired considerable importance and became directly accountable to Rome. Its influence grew throughout the region, mostly because of its trade in salt. It reached its peak in the 12th century, and its decline set in from the 15th. It was secularised in the 16th century by a bull of Pope Paul III and the buildings were largely destroyed during the war of the Camisards by Catinat, although its revenues continued to be drawn by commendatory abbots until the French Revolution.

Only a few scattered ruins survive. The site was declared a monument historique in 1984.

== List of abbots ==
- 762-815 : Corbilien
- 815-840 : Théodemir
- 840-886 : Thibaud
- 886-909 : Witard I
- 909-9?? : Raimbaud
- 9??-997 : Bermond
- 997-1004 : Witard II
- 1004-1054 : Warnier
- 1054-1071 : Raymond I
- 1071-1076 : Guillaume I Philaud
- 1076-1082 : Bérenger
- 1082-1084 : Arnaud I
- 1084-1085 : Pierre I
- 1085-1086 : Guillaume II
- 1086-1097 : Arnaud II
- 1097-1115 : Foulques I
- 1115-1117 : Pierre II
- 1117-1141 : Bertrand
- 1141-1155 : Pierre III
- 1155-1174 : Guillaume III
- 1174-1180 : Pierre IV d’Uzès
- 1180-1185 : Guillaume IV
- 1185-1190 : Foulques II
- 1190-1198 : Guillaume V
- 1198-1203 : Aldebert
- 1203-1203 : Raymond II
- 1203-1220 : Bernard I de Génerac
- 1220-1226 : Raymond III
- 1226-1243 : Pons
- 1243-1248 : Guillaume VI
- 1248-1249 : Raymond IV
- 1249-1257 : Guillaume VII Catel
- 1257-1272 : Géraud de Bruguières
- 1272-1275 : Bernard II de Nages
- 1275-1316 : Pierre V
- 1316-1317 : Pierre VI Bedos
- 1317-1319 : Raymond V Bernard
- 1319-1320 : Arnaud III
- 1320-1330 : Frédol
- 1330-1332 : Gaillard
- 1332-1352 : Raymond VI de Sérignac
- 1352-1362 : Gaucelme de Déaux
- 1362-1364 : Raymond VII
- 1364-1368 : Guillaume VIII Columbi
- 1368-1401 : Pierre VII de Lascarri
- 1401-1415 : Aymeric des Gardies
- 1415-1438 : Arnaud IV de Saint-Félix (1)
- 1438-1439 : Pierre VIII de Narbonne de Talairan
- 1439-1462 : Arnaud IV de Saint-Félix (2)
- 1462-1484 : Guillaume IX de Saint-Félix
- 1484-1508 : Guy Lauret
- 1508-1511 : Jacques Fournier de Beaune-Semblançay
- 1511-1523 : Martin Fournier de Beaune-Semblançay
- 1523-1529 : Jérôme de Canosse
- 1529-1532 : Louis I de Canosse
- 1532-1536 : Renaud de Marigny
- 1536-1540 : Jean I de Luxembourg-Brienne
- 1540-1571 : Barnabé de Fayolles
- 1571-1590 : François I de Fayolles
- 1590-1606 : Jean II de Fayolles
- 1606-1618 : Marc de Calvière de Saint-Césaire
- 1618-1632 : Jean III de Calvière de Saint-Césaire
- 1632-1646 : François II de Calvière de Saint-Césaire
- 1646-1656 : Antoine de Calvière de Saint-Césaire
- 1656-1690 : Louis II de Calvière de Saint-Césaire
- 1690-1712 : François III Chevalier de Saulx
- 1713-1719 : Louis III François-Gabriel de Hénin-Liétard
- 1719-1744 : Charles de Bannes d’Avejan
- 1744-1755 : Louis IV François de Vivet de Montclus
- 1755-1776 : Jean-Louis du Buisson de Beauteville
- 1776-1784 : Pierre IX Marie-Madeleine Cortois de Barbe
- 1784-1791 : Cardinal Louis V François de Bausset-Roquefort

Source: Gallia Christiana

== Sources and external links ==
- Clébert, Jean-Paul, 1972: Guide de la Provence mystérieuse. Paris: Éd. Tchou
- Nimausensis.com: history of Psalmody Abbey (in French)
