= Massacre of the Agau mill =

Massacre of Huguenots

The massacre of the Agau mill was a massacre of Huguenots near Nîmes on 1 April 1703 perpetrated by Royal French forces during the War of the Camisards.

The incident took place during the War of the Camisards, a Protestant Huguenot uprising against the persecutions that followed the edict of Fontainebleau in 1685. (Note: The Agau is a canal flowing from the Jardins de la Fontaine. It is now covered.)

== Massacre ==
A few hundred Protestants were celebrating Palm Sunday in secret at a wooden watermill on the Agau canal, which was owned by a man named Mercier. A nearby spy heard someone singing a hymn, leading to his discovery of the festivities. He rushed to the marquis of Montrevel. The marquis ceased his lunch and gathered his soldiers, who were led to the mill.

Instead of arresting the people present, the Marquis told his men to set fire to all four corners of the wooden mill and to kill anyone who tried to escape. A mother holding her baby son tried to escape the burning building, but the soldiers blocked her way so she could not leave. At least twenty-one people, all of them women, old children or children, died in the flames.

It was no combat which ensued, for the Huguenots were incapable of resistance, it was simply a massacre; a certain number of the dragoons entered the mill sword in hand, stabbing all whom they could reach, whilst the rest of the force stationed outside before the windows received those who jumped out on the points of their swords.

— Alexandre Dumas, Massacres of the South

The only survivor was a sixteen-year old girl who escaped through the palisade and was saved by the marquis' valet who felt uncomfortable killing her. She was caught the next day and hanged. The valet was arranged to be executed but was freed at the requests of the Sisters of Mercy.

On 2 April, the day following the incident, royal troops burned down the watermill. The area where the mill stood is now 1 rue Colbert.

== Aftermath ==
The massacre caused a massive outcry that included several of Louis XIV's ministers and even the king's secret consort, Françoise d'Aubigné. The bishop of Nîmes, Esprit Fléchier, described the massacre as "necessary to stop the pride of this people [the Huguenots]."

Estimates of the number of fatalities are controversial. F. Rouvière wrote in 1893 that only a maximum of 21 people could have died in the massacre and pointed out inconsistencies with the traditional narrative. In 1920 another scholar criticized Rouvière's report as downplaying the massacre and being an act of historical revisionism.

== In popular culture ==
The French writer Alexandre Dumas recounted the massacre in his essay, Massacres of the South.

== See also ==
- Nègrepelisse massacre
