= Champdomergue =

Hill in Occitania, France

- Location within Occitanie

Highest point
- Coordinates: 44°16′20.64″N 3°54′10.44″E

Champdomergue is a hill in the commune of Le Collet-de-Dèze, where on 11 September 1702 the Camisards fought a battle against the royalist forces with no clear outcome. This was the first battle in the Wars in the Cévennes. In 1943–44 it was a stronghold of the Maquis resistance movement who were preparing for the liberation of the Alès basin.

There are two monuments in the garrigues on the summit of the hill commemorating these events. A third monument is to the prophet Françoise Bres, who was executed by hanging at Pont-du-Montvert, 25 January 1702.

In addition to being an important site for France's Protestant minority, the hill has also attracted tourism for its historical significance and hiking trail.
