= Maurel =

Maurel is a French surname. Notable people with the surname include:

- Abdias Maurel (died 1705), French cavalry officer
- Patrice Maurel (born 1978), French footballer
- Victor Maurel (1848–1923), French operatic baritone

== See also ==
- Maurel & Prom, a French oil company
