= Roland Laporte =

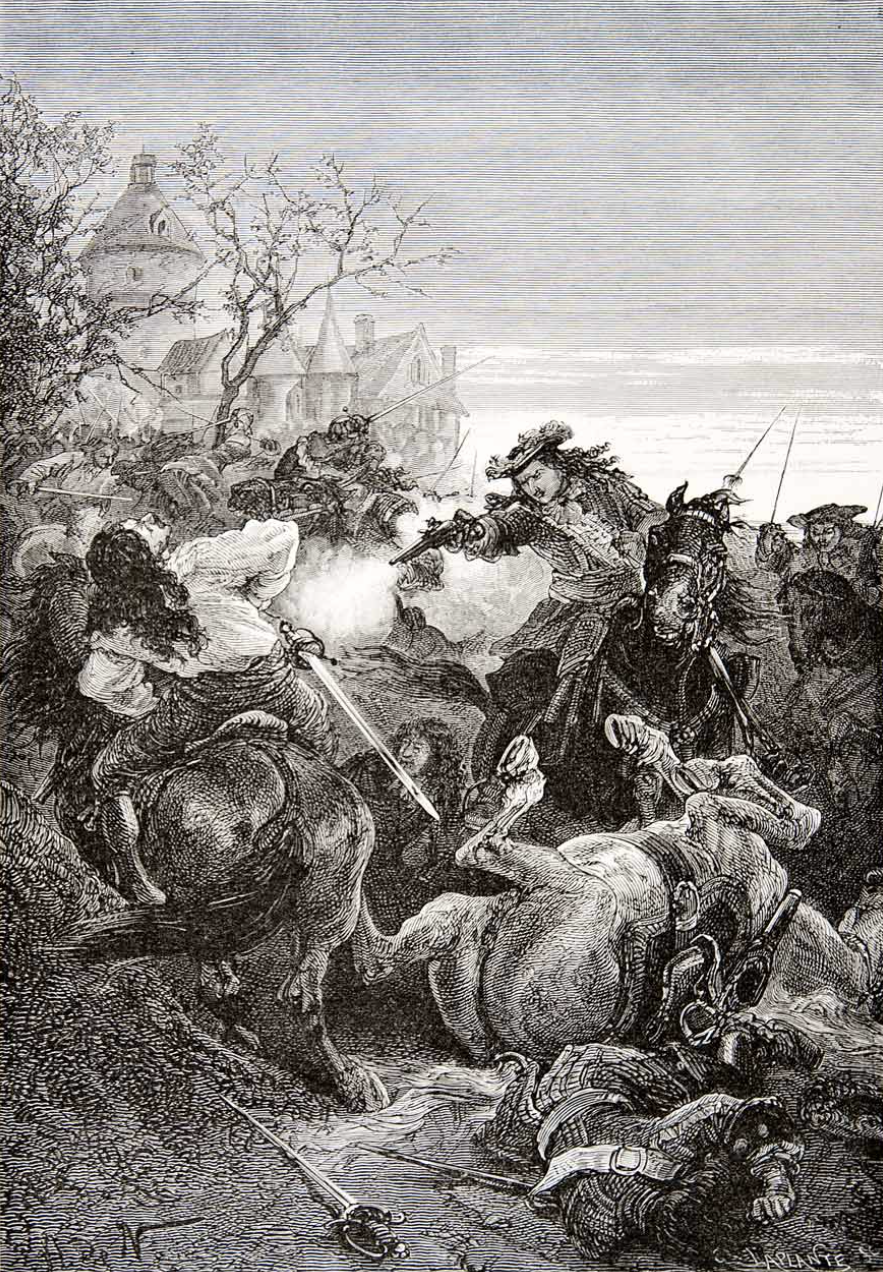
Wounding of Roland Laporte (Alphonse de Neuville, c. 1880)

Roland Laporte (1675 – 14 August 1704), better known as Roland, was a Camisard leader who was born at Mas Soubeyran, Languedoc in a cottage that has become the property of the Société de l'Histoire du Protestantisme français and contains relics of the hero.

He was a nephew of Laporte, the Camisard leader, who was hunted down and shot in October 1702, and became the leader of a band of a thousand men which he formed into a disciplined army with magazines, arsenals and hospitals. For daring in action and rapidity of movement he was second only to Jean Cavalier. Both leaders in 1702 secured entrance to the town of Sauve under the pretence of being royal officers, burnt the church and carried off provisions and ammunition for their forces.

Roland, who called himself general of the children of God, terrorized the country between Nîmes and Alais, burning churches and houses, and slaying those suspected of hostility against the Huguenots, though without personally taking any part of the spoil. Cavalier was already in negotiation with Marshal Villars when Roland cut to pieces a Catholic regiment at Fontmorte in May 1704.

He refused to lay down his arms without definite assurance of the restoration of the privileges accorded by the Edict of Nantes. Villars then sought to negotiate, offering Roland the command of a regiment on foreign service and liberty of conscience, though not the free exercise of their religion, for his co-religionists. This parley had no results, but Roland was betrayed to his enemies, and on 14 August 1704 was shot while defending himself against his captors. The five officers who were with him surrendered, and were broken on the wheel at Nîmes. Roland's death put an end to the effective resistance of the Cévenois.

== Sources ==
- See A Court, Histoire des troubles des Cévennes (Villefranche, 1760); HM Baird, The Huguenots and the revocation of the Edict of Nantes (2 vols., London, 1895), and other literature dealing with the Camisards.
