= Abraham Mazel =

Huguenot insurrectionist (1677–1710)

- Born: 5 September 1677; Saint-Jean-du-Gard, Languedoc, France
- Died: 17 October 1710 (aged 33) near Uzès, Languedoc, France
- Movement: Camisards

Abraham Mazel (5 September 1677 – 17 October 1710), was a French Huguenot from the Cévennes region and Camisard revolutionary, known for leading the insurrection that led to the War of the Camisards (1702-1704).

== Biography ==
Abraham Mazel was born to a Huguenot family at Saint-Jean-du-Gard, Languedoc, France, on 5 September 1677. His father was David Mazel (1648-1719), a woolcomber, and his mother was Jeanne Daudé (1650-1680).

In October 1701, Mazel was visited by "the spirit of prophecy" urging him to free his fellow Huguenots imprisoned by abbot François Langlade, archbishop of the Cévennes. The archbishop was well known in the Cevennes for his brutal repression of French Protestants.

On 24 July 1702, about fifty peasants, led by Mazel and Ésprit Séguier, marched onto the archpriest's residence at Le Pont-de-Montvert, to inflict vengeance upon him, and release the imprisoned Huguenots. During the night they raided Langlade's residence, released the prisoners from their underground cells, and then set the house on fire. While trying to flee from a window, Langlade fell and was injured. He was then killed by the peasants.

On October 17, 1710, Mazel was taken prisoner and killed at Mas de Couteau, near Uzès.
