= Martignargues =

- Commune
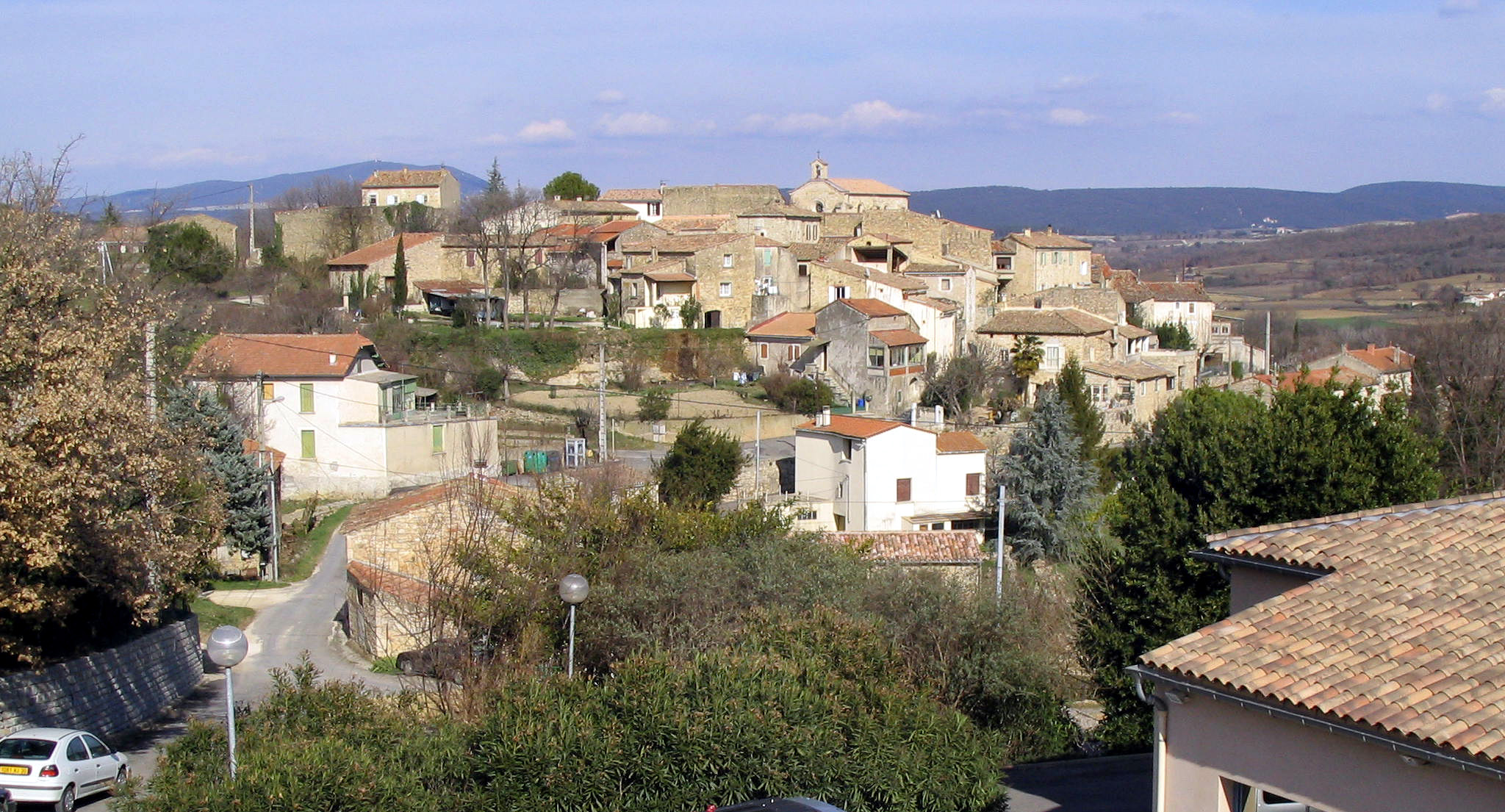
- A general view of Martignargues

- Coat of arms
- Location of Martignargues
- Location within France Location within Occitanie
- Coordinates: 44°02′45″N 4°10′44″E
- Country: France
- Region: Occitania
- Department: Gard
- Arrondissement: Alès
- Canton: Alès-3
- Intercommunality: Alès Agglomération

Government
  - Mayor (2020–2026): Jérôme Vic
- Area^{1}: 4.92 km^{2} (1.90 sq mi)
- Highest elevation: 172 m (564 ft)
- Lowest elevation: 88 m (289 ft)
- Population (2023): 439
  - Density: 89.2/km^{2} (231/sq mi)
- Time zone: UTC+01:00 (CET)
  - Summer (DST): UTC+02:00 (CEST)
- INSEE/Postal code: 30158 /30360
- ^{1} French Land Register data, which excludes lakes, ponds, glaciers > 1 km^{2} (0.386 sq mi or 247 acres) and river estuaries.

Martignargues (French pronunciation: [maʁtiɲaʁɡ]; Occitan: Martinhargues) is a commune in the Gard department in southern France.

== Population ==
Historical population
Year	Pop.	±% p.a.
1968	149	—
1975	149	+0.00%
1982	213	+5.24%
1990	247	+1.87%
1999	246	−0.05%
2007	367	+5.13%
2012	412	+2.34%
2017	424	+0.58%
2023	439	+0.58%
Source: INSEE

== See also ==
- Communes of the Gard department
