= Nicolas Auguste de La Baume =

French noble who was a Marshal of France under Louis XIV

- Marquis de Montrevel-en-Bresse
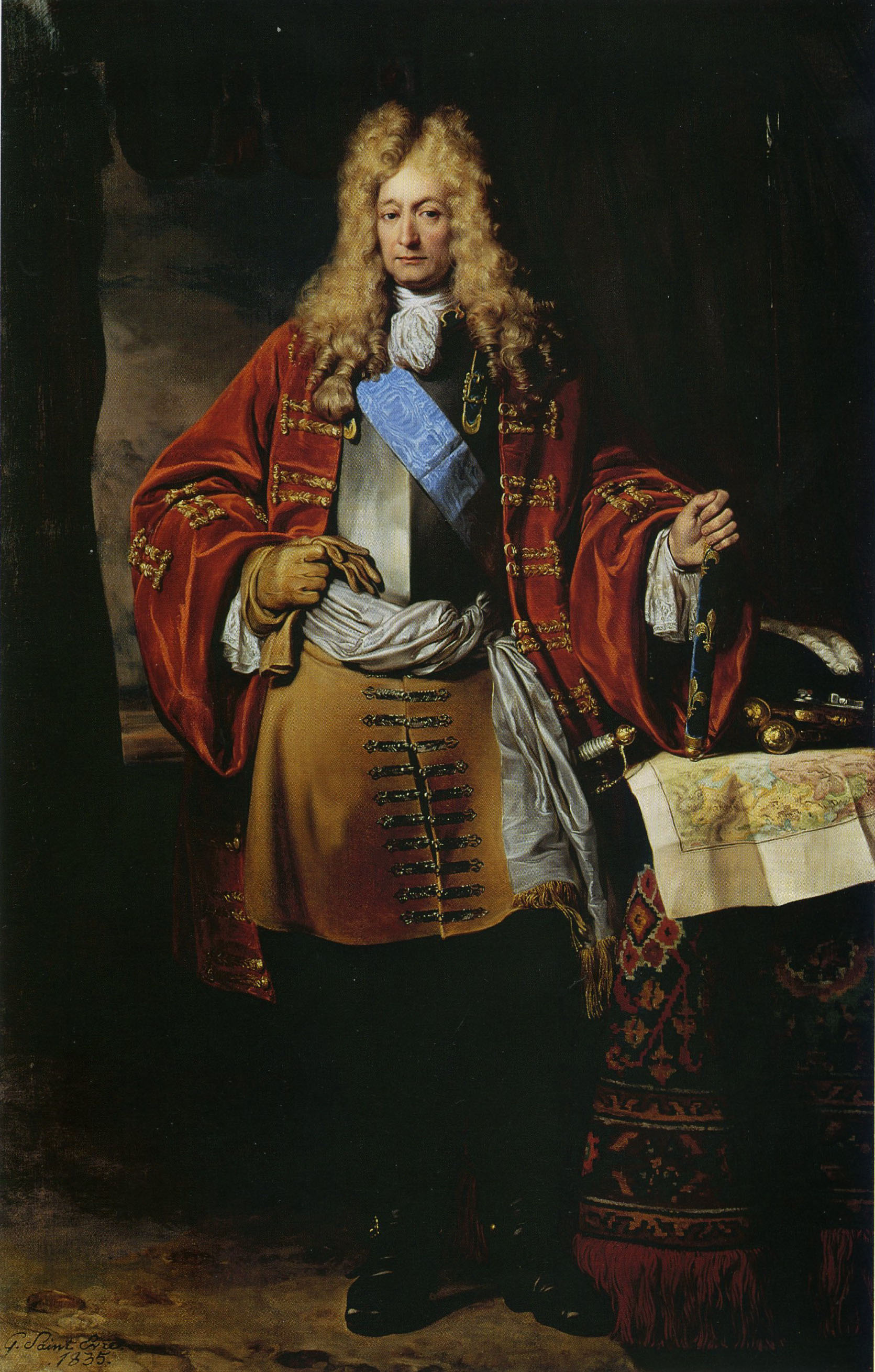
- Portrait du marquis de Monterevel; Oil on canvas by Gillot Saint-Evre, 1835
- Born: 23 December 1645; Paris
- Died: 11 October 1716 (aged 70); Paris
- Family: Family of La Baume
- Issue: one son
- Military career
- Allegiance: French monarchy
- Rank: Maréchal de France
- Nickname: Maréchal de Montrevel
- Conflicts: War of Devolution; Franco-Dutch War; War of the Reunions; Nine Years' War; War in the Cevennes
- Awards: Order of the Holy Spirit

Nicolas Auguste de La Baume, marquis de Monterevel, (Paris, 23 December 1645 - Paris, 11 October 1716) was a French 17th and 18th century military commander, and Maréchal de France (1703). He was also known by the title maréchal de Montrevel.

== Biography ==
He was the son of Marie Olier-Nointel and Ferdinand de La Baume, comte de Montrevel, Lieutenant General of the army of the King and governor of the provinces de Bresse et de Bugey. He was raised at court.

=== Army service ===
He served in high office in the War of Devolution, the Dutch Wars, War of the Reunions and the War of the League of Augsburg (Nine Years'War).

In 1703, he was promoted to Marshal of France and sent to Languedoc as commander-in-chief of Louis XIV's troops, tasked with suppressing the Camisards. He became notorious for massacres of the local population, deportations, and burning villages. These atrocities had the opposite effect and he was replaced by Marshal de Villars on 21 April 1704.

He was made governor of Guyenne in 1704, which he remained until 1716, when he was sent to Alsace and then to Franche-Comté. He was made a Knight in the Order of the Holy Spirit in 1705.

=== Personal life ===
He married three times and had a single son Henri by his second wife.
