= Abdias Maurel =

- Born: Le Cailar, Languedoc
- Died: 22 April 1705; Nîmes, Languedoc
- Military career
- Allegiance: France
- Branch: Army

Abdias Maurel (before 1702 – 22 April 1705), Camisard leader, who became a cavalry officer in the French army and gained distinction in Italy.

== Biography ==
In Italy he served under Marshal Catinat, and on this account he himself is sometimes known as Catinat. In 1702, when the revolt in the Cévennes broke out, he became one of the Camisard leaders, and in this capacity his name was soon known and feared. He refused to accept the peace made by Jean Cavalier in 1704, and after passing a few weeks in Switzerland he returned to France and became one of the chiefs of those Camisards who were still in arms.

He was deeply involved in a plot to capture some French towns, a scheme which, it was hoped, would be helped by England and the Dutch Republic. But it failed; Maurel was betrayed, and with three other leaders of the movement was burned to death at Nîmes on 22 April 1705.

== Assessment ==
According to the 1911 Encyclopædia Britannica, "[h]e was a man of great physical strength; but he was very cruel, and boasted he had killed 200 Roman Catholics with his own hands."
