= Nicolas de Lamoignon =

French intendant over Languedoc (1648–1724)

Nicolas
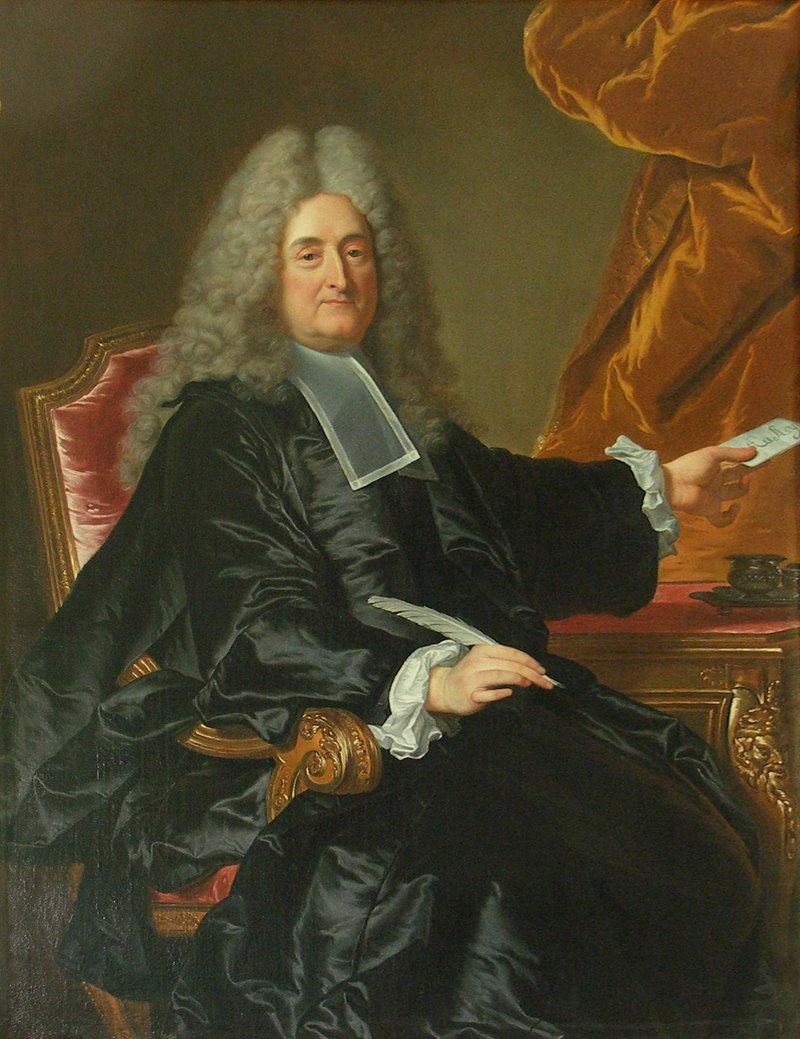
- Born: 1648
- Died: 1724 (aged 75–76)

Nicolas de Lamoignon de Basville (1648–1724) was a French intendant over Languedoc in the early 18th century.

Nicolas, the second son of Guillaume de Lamoignon, took the surname of Basville. Following his hereditary calling he filled many public offices, serving as intendant of Montauban, of Pau, of Poitiers and of Languedoc before his retirement in 1718. His administration of Languedoc was chiefly remarkable for vigorous measures against the Camisards and other Protestants, but in other directions his work in the south of France was more beneficent, as, following the example of Jean-Baptiste Colbert, he encouraged agriculture and industry generally and did something towards improving the means of communication.

He wrote a Mémoire, which contains much interesting information about his public work. This was published at Amsterdam in 1724. Lamoignon, who was called by Saint-Simon, "the king and tyrant of Languedoc," died in Paris on 17 May 1724.

He was accused by Voltaire of instigating the revocation of the Edict of Nantes.
