= Gillot Saint-Evre =

French painter

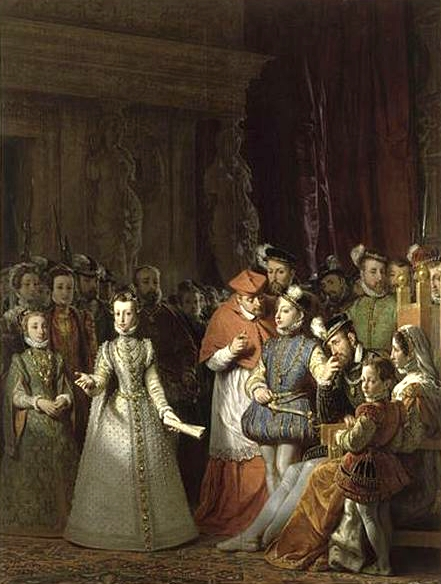
Mary Stuart at the Court of Francis II

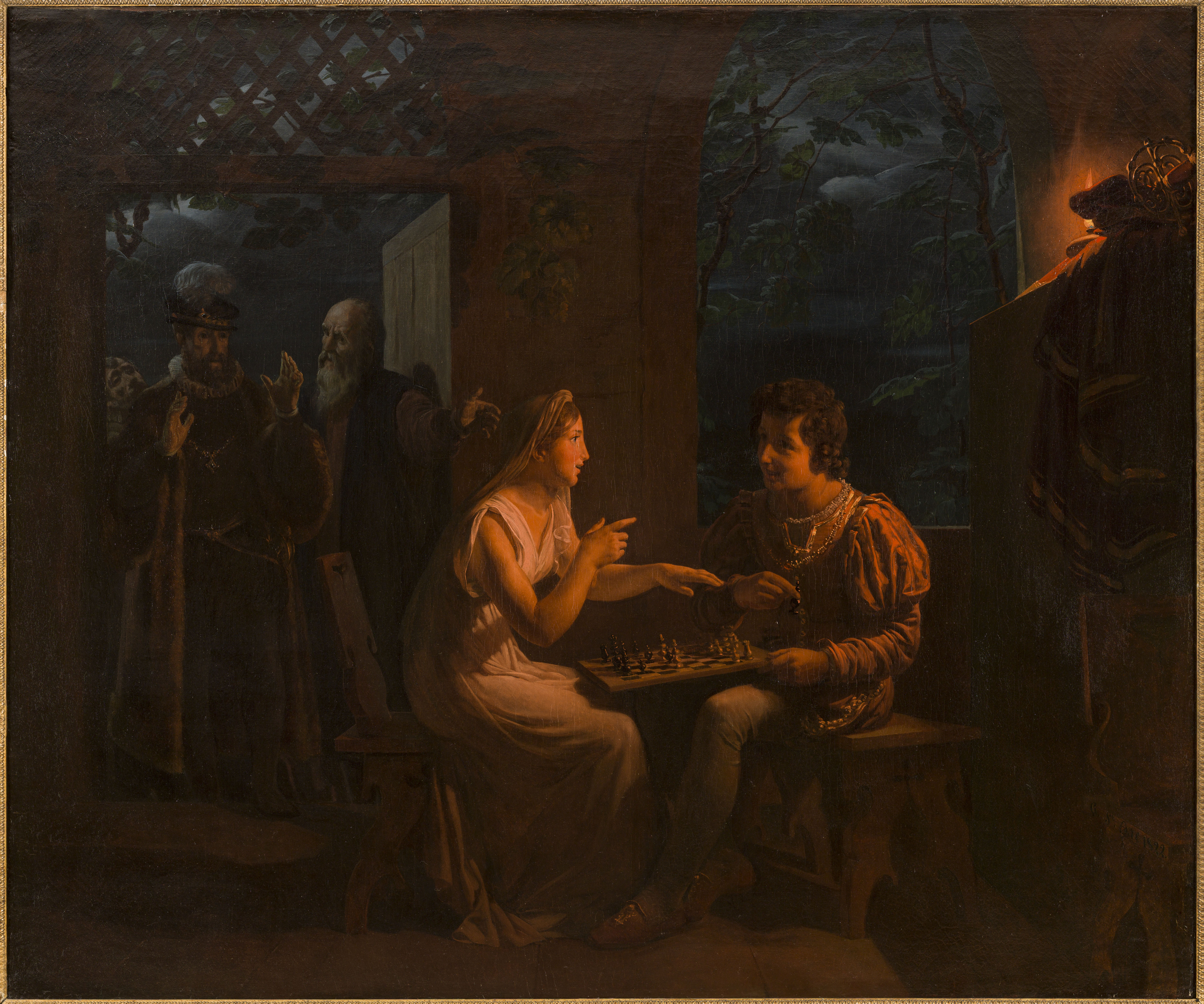
Miranda Playing Chess with Ferdinand

Gillot Saint-Evre (1791, Boult-sur-Suippe – 1858, Paris) was a French painter and engraver. He created scenes on historical and literary subjects, as well as genre scenes and portraits.

== Life and work ==
His creative career began in the 1820s and first attracted attention at the Paris Salon of 1822, where he displayed two paintings depicting scenes from The Tempest by Shakespeare. A young journalist named Adolphe Thiers (who would later become the President of France) wrote a positive review of the exhibit and called him a painter of great promise. This inspired him to create more works on literary themes.

Among these works are lithographs showing Louis XI with Countess Isabelle de Croye, from Quentin Durward by Sir Walter Scott, and scenes from Henry III and His Court, an early play by Alexandre Dumas. The failure of a series of works on Don Quixote forced him to do a critical reevaluation of his work.

He decided to abandon literature in favor of history. Although he focused on events from Medieval France, he continued to paint in the prevailing Romantic and Sentimentalist style. He premiered his new specialty at the Salon of 1833, with a scene depicting Joan of Arc being presented to King Charles VII in 1429; currently at the Мusée National in the Palace of Versailles. This was the first of a series of paintings on her life.

Generally, critics now consider the history paintings to be inferior to his portraits. A good example of the latter are his joint portraits of the architect, Joseph-Jacques Ramée and his wife, Caroline.

Interest in his work gradually declined and he was forgotten, until 2016, when "Miranda Playing Chess with Ferdinand" was auctioned at a modest price and acquired by the Musée de la Vie Romantique.
