= Saumane, Gard =

Saumane
- Commune
- Coat of arms
- Location of Saumane
- Location within France Location within Occitanie
- Coordinates: 44°07′15″N 3°45′42″E
- Country: France
- Region: Occitania
- Department: Gard
- Arrondissement: Le Vigan
- Canton: Le Vigan

Government
  - Mayor (2020–2026): Laurette Angeli
- Area^{1}: 12.14 km^{2} (4.69 sq mi)
- Elevation: 324 m (1,063 ft)
- Highest elevation: 774 m (2,539 ft)
- Lowest elevation: 300 m (980 ft)
- Population (2023): 303
  - Density: 25.0/km^{2} (64.6/sq mi)
- Time zone: UTC+01:00 (CET)
  - Summer (DST): UTC+02:00 (CEST)
- INSEE/Postal code: 30310 /30125
- ^{1} French Land Register data, which excludes lakes, ponds, glaciers > 1 km^{2} (0.386 sq mi or 247 acres) and river estuaries.

Saumane (French pronunciation: [soman]; Occitan: Saumana) is a commune in the Gard department in southern France.

== Population ==
Historical population
| Year | Pop. | ±% p.a. |
|---|---|---|
| 1968 | 186 | — |
| 1975 | 164 | −1.78% |
| 1982 | 141 | −2.14% |
| 1990 | 183 | +3.31% |
| 1999 | 227 | +2.42% |
| 2007 | 256 | +1.51% |
| 2012 | 268 | +0.92% |
| 2017 | 276 | +0.59% |
| 2023 | 303 | +1.57% |
Source: INSEE

== See also ==
- Communes of the Gard department
