= Jean Cavalier =

Huguenot leader (1681–1740)

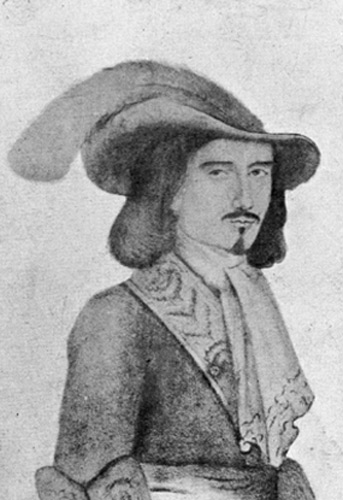
- Born: 28 November 1681; Ribaute, Languedoc, Kingdom of France
- Died: 17 May 1740 (aged 58); Chelsea, London, England

Jean Cavalier (28 November 1681 – 17 May 1740), was the Occitan Huguenot chief of the Camisards. He was born at Mas Roux, a small hamlet in the commune of Ribaute near Anduze in southern France.

== Early life ==
His father, an illiterate peasant, had been compelled by persecution to become a Roman Catholic along with his family, but his mother brought him up secretly in the Protestant faith. In his boyhood he became a shepherd, and about his twentieth year he was apprenticed to a baker. Threatened with prosecution for his religious opinions he went to Geneva, where he spent the year 1701; he returned to the Cévennes on the eve of the rebellion of the Camisards, who by the murder of the Abbé du Chayla at Pont-de-Monvert on the night of 24 July 1702 raised the standard of revolt. Some months later he became their leader. He showed himself possessed of an extraordinary genius for war, and Marshal Villars paid him the high compliment of saying that he was as courageous in attack as he was prudent in retreat, and that by his extraordinary knowledge of the country he displayed in the management of his troops a skill as great as that of the ablest officers. Within a period of two years he was to hold in check Count Victor Maurice de Broglie and Marshal Montrevel, generals of Louis XIV, and to carry on one of the most terrible partisan wars in French history.

== Guerrilla ==
He organised the Camisard forces and maintained the most severe discipline. As an orator he derived his inspiration from the prophets of Israel, and raised the enthusiasm of his rude mountaineers to a pitch so high that they were ready to die with their young leader for the sake of liberty of conscience. Each battle increased the terror of his name. On Christmas Day 1702 he dared to hold a religious assembly at the very gates of Alais, and put to flight the local militia which came forth to attack him. At Vagnas, on 10 February 1703, he routed the royal troops, but, defeated in his turn, he was compelled to find safety in flight. But he reappeared, was again defeated at Tour de Billot (30 April), and again recovered himself, recruits flocking to him to fill up the places of the slain.

By a long series of successes he raised his reputation to the highest pitch, and gained the full confidence of the people. It was in vain that more rigorous measures were adopted against the Camisards. Cavalier boldly carried the war into the plain, made terrible reprisals, and threatened even Nîmes itself. On 16 April 1704 he encountered Marshal Montrevel himself at the bridge of Nages, with 1000 men against 5000, and, though defeated after a desperate conflict, he made a successful retreat with two-thirds of his men. It was at this moment that Marshal Villars, wishing to put an end to the terrible struggle, opened negotiations, and Cavalier was induced to attend a conference at Pont d'Avne near Alais on 11 May 1704, and on 16 May he made submission at Nîmes. These negotiations, with the proudest monarch in Europe, he carried on not as a rebel but as the leader of an army which had waged an honourable war. Louis XIV gave him a commission as colonel, which Villars presented to him personally, and a pension of 1200 livres. At the same time he authorised the formation of a Camisard regiment for service in Spain under his command.

Before leaving the Cévennes for the last time he went to Alais and to Ribaute, followed by an immense concourse of people. But Cavalier had not been able to obtain liberty of conscience, and his Camisards almost to a man broke forth in wrath against him, reproaching him for what they described as his treacherous desertion. On 21 June 1704, with a hundred Camisards who were still faithful to him, he departed from Nîmes and came to Neu-Brisach (Alsace), where he was to be quartered. From Dijon he went on to Paris, where Louis XIV gave him audience and heard his explanation of the revolt of the Cévennes. Returning to Dijon, fearing to be imprisoned in the fortress of Neu-Brisach, he escaped with his troop near Montbéliard and took refuge at Lausanne.

But he was too much of a soldier to abandon the career of arms. He offered his services to the duke of Savoy, and with his Camisards made war in the Val d'Aosta. After the peace he crossed to England, where he formed a regiment of refugees which took part in the Spanish expedition under the earl of Peterborough and Sir Cloudesley Shovell in May 1705. At the battle of Almansa the Camisards found themselves opposed to a French regiment, and without firing the two bodies rushed one upon the other. Cavalier wrote later (10 July 1707): "The only consolation that remains to me is that the regiment I had the honour to command never looked back, but sold its life dearly on the field of battle. I fought as long as a man stood beside me and until numbers overpowered me, losing also an immense quantity of blood from a dozen wounds which I received." Marshal Berwick never spoke of this tragic event without visible emotion.

On his return to England a small pension was given him and he settled at Dublin, where he published Memoirs of the Wars of the Cévennes under Col. Cavalier, written in French and translated into English with a dedication to Lord Carteret (1726). Though Cavalier received, no doubt, assistance in the publication of the Memoirs, it is nonetheless true that he provided the materials, and that his work is the most valuable source for the history of his life. He was made a general on 27 October 1735, and on 25 May 1738 was appointed Lieutenant Governor of Jersey. Writing in the following year (26 August 1739) he says: "I am overworked and weary; I am going to take the waters in England so as to be in a fit condition for the war against the Spaniards if they reject counsels of prudence." He was promoted to the rank of major-general on 2 July 1739, and died in the following year. In the parochial register of St Luke's, Chelsea, there is an entry: Burial A.D. 1740, 18 May, Brigadier John Cavalier.

According to one account, he was the fortunate rival of Voltaire for the hand of Olympe, daughter of Madame Dunoyer, author of the Lettres galantes. During his stay in England, he married the daughter of Captain de Ponthieu and Marguerite de la Rochefoucauld, refugees settled at Portarlington. Malesherbes, the courageous defender of Louis XVI, paid eloquent tribute to this young hero of the Cévennes: "I confess," he wrote, "that this warrior, who, without ever having served, found himself by the mere gift of nature a great general; this Camisard who was bold enough to punish a crime in the presence of a fierce troop that sustained itself through lesser crimes; this rough peasant who, when admitted at the age of twenty into cultivated society, absorbed its manners and won its affection and esteem; this man who, though accustomed to a turbulent life and with just cause to take pride in his success, yet possessed by nature enough philosophy to enjoy thirty-five years of tranquil private life—appears to me one of the rarest characters to be found in history."
