= François Langlade =

French Catholic abbot (died 1702)

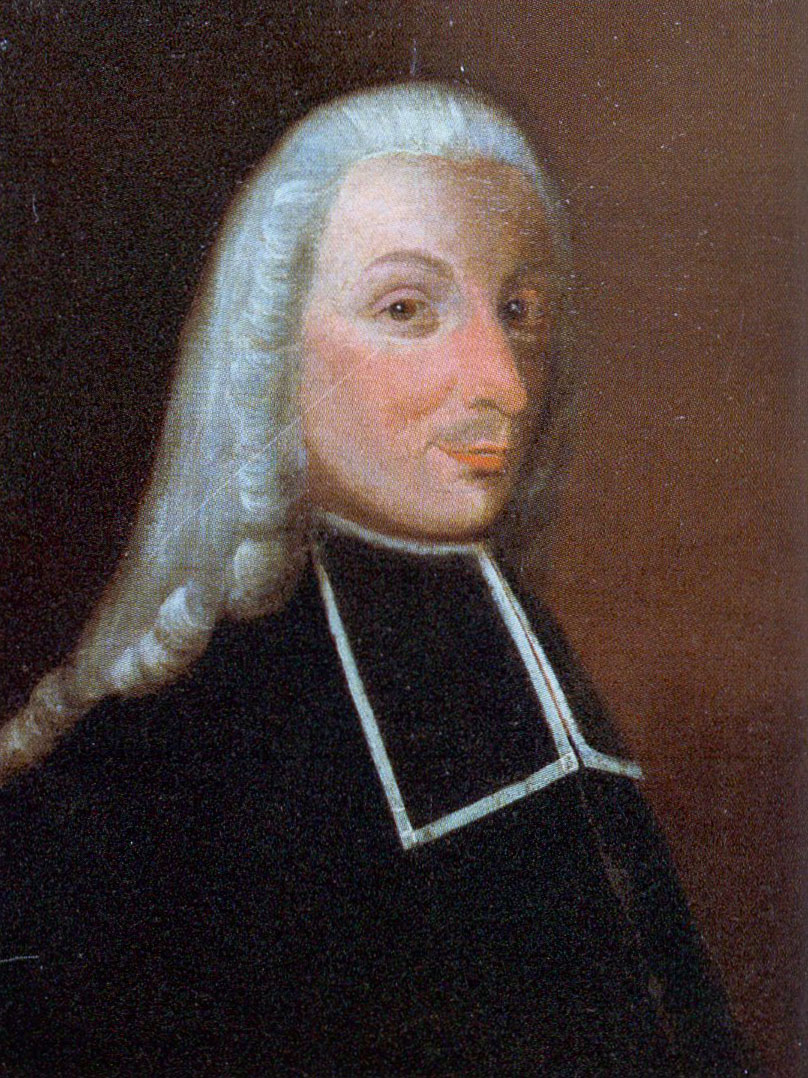
François de Langlade du Chayla at Musée Ignon-Fabre, Mende

François de Langlade du Chayla (c. 1647 – 24 July 1702) was the French Catholic Abbé of Chaila (or Chayla), Archpriest of the Cevennes and Inspector of Missions of the Cevennes. His brutal repression of French (Protestant) Huguenots by means of torture caused his assassination and sparked the War of the Camisards.

== Life ==
A missionary in his youth in Siam (modern Thailand), he there suffered near-martyrdom at the hands of Buddhists, was left for dead, but survived and returned to France. His house in Le Pont-de-Montvert served as a prison for Protestants who were tortured. As Robert Louis Stevenson said, Chayla "...closed the hands of his prisoners upon live coal, and plucked out the hairs of their beards, to convince them that they were deceived in their [religious beliefs]."

== Historical reputation ==
P. H. Stanhope in his Reign of Queen Anne (v. 1, p. 104-105) writes about him, "Scarce any worse persecutors are recorded in history than M. de Baville, Intendant of the Province, and Abbe du Chaila, inspector of the missions, and arch-priest, as he was called, of the Cevennes. The latter among other atrocities was wont to renew upon his prisoners the torments sustained by the early Christians in the reign of Nero, when they were smeared with combustibles and set on fire as living torches. In the same spirit, though not to the full perfection of his model, Du Chaila would direct that wool steeped in oil should be tied around the hands of the Protestants whom he succeeded in seizing, and should burn until their fingers were consumed. At last a party of insurgents surprised at Pont de Montvert the house of this ferocious priest, who barricaded himself in the upper chambers while the vaults below were thrown open, and some of his maimed victims were seen to issue forth. At this sight the excited multitude heaped wood and kindled it around the house, and it seems as a just retribution of Providence that Du Chaila himself perished in the flames."

== Bibliography ==
- Massacres of the South (1551–1815), by Alexandre Dumas, père - chapter II has an excellent account of the life and martyrdom of abbe de Chayla.
- "The murder of the abbot of Chaila", English translation. Original page in French.
- Travels with a Donkey in the Cévennes, by Robert Louis Stevenson. See chapter "Pont De Montvert" for a brief account.
- History of England comprising the reign of Queen Anne until the peace of Utrecht. 1700 - 1713, vol. I by Philip Henry Stanhope, Earl Stanhope
