= Le Vigan, Gard =

Le Vigan
- Subprefecture and commune
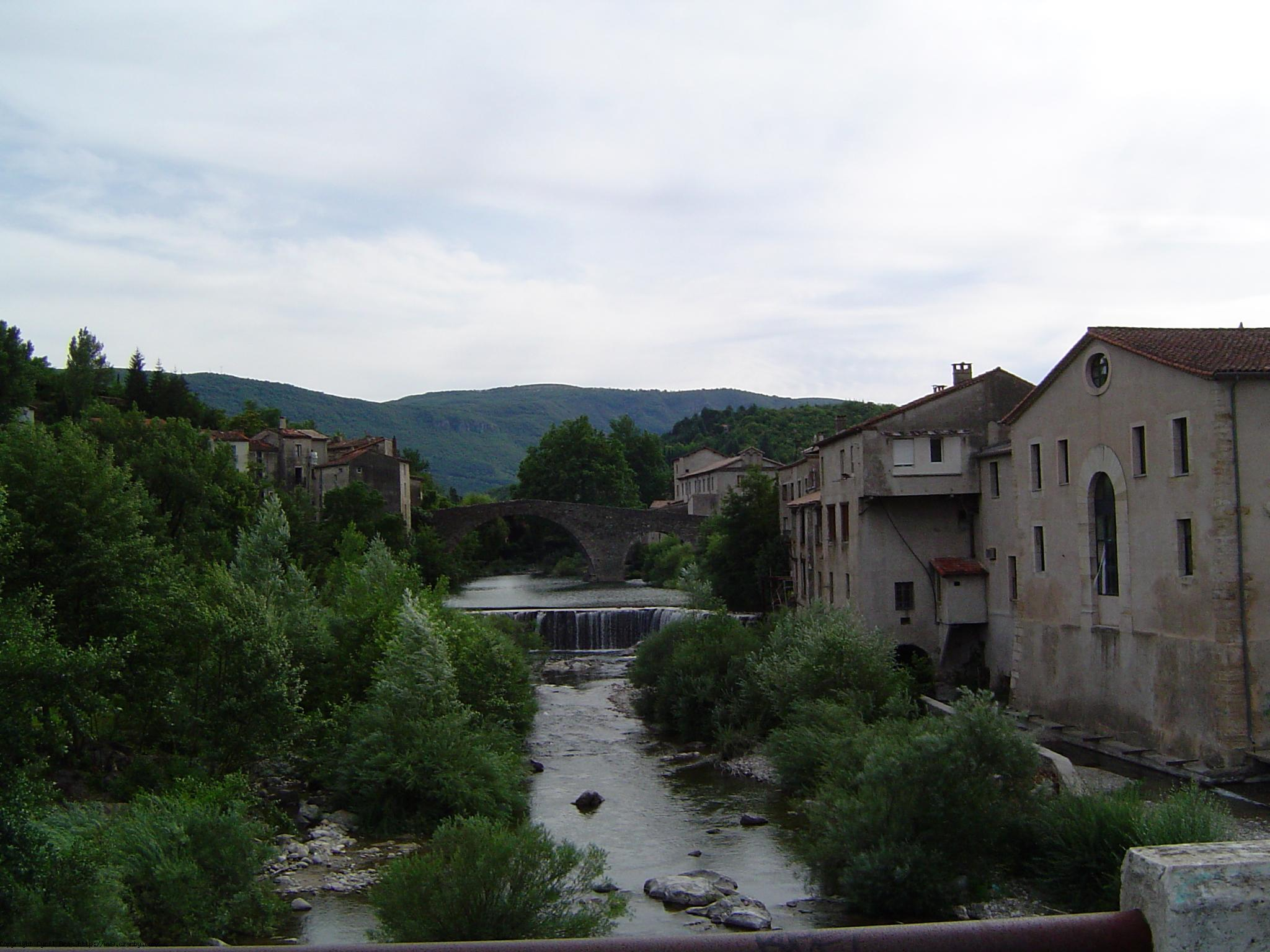
- Le Vigan and the Arre River

- Coat of arms
- Location of Le Vigan
- Location within France Location within Occitanie
- Coordinates: 43°59′35″N 3°36′22″E
- Country: France
- Region: Occitania
- Department: Gard
- Arrondissement: Le Vigan
- Canton: Le Vigan
- Intercommunality: Pays Viganais

Government
  - Mayor (2020–2026): Sylvie Arnal
- Area^{1}: 17.24 km^{2} (6.66 sq mi)
- Elevation: 231 m (758 ft)
- Highest elevation: 640 m (2,100 ft)
- Lowest elevation: 184 m (604 ft)
- Population (2023): 3,863
  - Density: 224.1/km^{2} (580.3/sq mi)
- Time zone: UTC+01:00 (CET)
  - Summer (DST): UTC+02:00 (CEST)
- INSEE/Postal code: 30350 /30120
- ^{1} French Land Register data, which excludes lakes, ponds, glaciers > 1 km^{2} (0.386 sq mi or 247 acres) and river estuaries.

Le Vigan (French pronunciation: [lə viɡɑ̃]; Occitan: Lo Vigan) is a commune in the Gard department in southern France. It is a sub-prefecture of the department.

== Geography ==
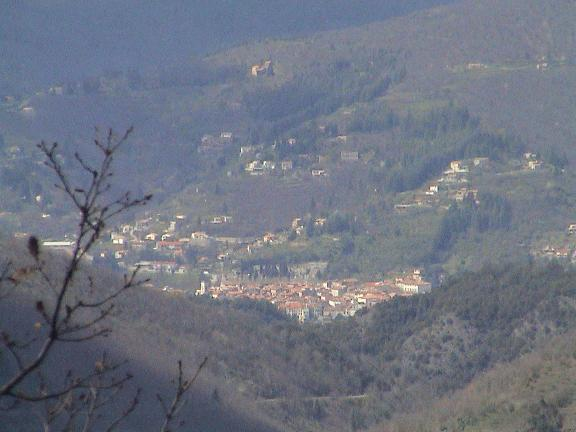
View from the mountains to Le Vigan

Le Vigan is located at the south of the Massif Central and near the Mont Aigoual, in the Arre valley. The town is on the southern edge of the Cévennes National Park and is the most populous town within the park.

=== Climate ===
Le Vigan has a hot-summer Mediterranean climate (Köppen climate classification Csa). The average annual temperature in Le Vigan is 13.7 °C (56.7 °F). The average annual rainfall is 1,494.8 mm (58.85 in) with October as the wettest month. The temperatures are highest on average in July, at around 22.6 °C (72.7 °F), and lowest in January, at around 6.2 °C (43.2 °F). The highest temperature ever recorded in Le Vigan was 44.0 °C (111.2 °F) on 28 June 2019; the coldest temperature ever recorded was −13.7 °C (7.3 °F) on 16 January 1985.

Climate data for Le Vigan (1991−2020 normals, extremes 1965−present)
Month	Jan	Feb	Mar	Apr	May	Jun	Jul	Aug	Sep	Oct	Nov	Dec	Year
Record high °C (°F)	22.4 (72.3)	25.9 (78.6)	29.0 (84.2)	32.3 (90.1)	34.0 (93.2)	44.0 (111.2)	42.0 (107.6)	40.6 (105.1)	36.9 (98.4)	33.0 (91.4)	26.0 (78.8)	21.1 (70.0)	44.0 (111.2)
Mean daily maximum °C (°F)	10.9 (51.6)	12.1 (53.8)	15.8 (60.4)	18.4 (65.1)	22.7 (72.9)	27.4 (81.3)	30.5 (86.9)	30.2 (86.4)	25.1 (77.2)	19.6 (67.3)	14.3 (57.7)	11.2 (52.2)	19.9 (67.8)
Daily mean °C (°F)	6.2 (43.2)	6.7 (44.1)	9.7 (49.5)	12.3 (54.1)	16.0 (60.8)	20.0 (68.0)	22.6 (72.7)	22.3 (72.1)	18.1 (64.6)	14.2 (57.6)	9.5 (49.1)	6.6 (43.9)	13.7 (56.7)
Mean daily minimum °C (°F)	1.5 (34.7)	1.2 (34.2)	3.7 (38.7)	6.1 (43.0)	9.3 (48.7)	12.6 (54.7)	14.7 (58.5)	14.5 (58.1)	11.1 (52.0)	8.8 (47.8)	4.8 (40.6)	2.1 (35.8)	7.5 (45.5)
Record low °C (°F)	−13.7 (7.3)	−12.5 (9.5)	−11.3 (11.7)	−4.3 (24.3)	−0.9 (30.4)	3.4 (38.1)	4.8 (40.6)	4.7 (40.5)	0.6 (33.1)	−3.6 (25.5)	−9.0 (15.8)	−10.5 (13.1)	−13.7 (7.3)
Average precipitation mm (inches)	139.3 (5.48)	89.7 (3.53)	100.7 (3.96)	120.1 (4.73)	105.8 (4.17)	71.5 (2.81)	40.4 (1.59)	53.4 (2.10)	170.3 (6.70)	226.6 (8.92)	222.1 (8.74)	154.9 (6.10)	1,494.8 (58.85)
Average precipitation days (≥ 1.0 mm)	9.0	7.1	7.2	8.5	8.0	5.8	4.0	5.3	6.5	10.6	10.4	9.4	91.8
Source: Météo-France

== History ==
On a river at the southern edge of the Massif Central, Le Vigan is situated on a natural boundaryline. In the 2nd-3rd centuries BCE, it was situated between the territories occupied by the Volcae Arecomici, the Averni, and the Gabali tribes. In 121 BCE the Romans gained control of much of southern France including the area around Le Vigan. The Volcae Arecomici voluntarily surrendered their territory, and the Arverni gave up much territory in a treaty that nevertheless preserve their independence. Under Roman control, Le Vigan was part of the Roman "Provincia," (hence Provence) called Gallia Narbonensis.

Le Vigan is supposed to occupy the site of the old Gallo-Roman town of Vindomagus. The name implies that a Celtic population was settled there. "Magh" signifies meadow or plain, and "vindo" is the Latin form given to the word we find in so many places to signify open country, wind-swept, surt-scorched, rambled over by sheep,... No descriptive appellation could better suit Le Vigan.

— Sabine Baring-Gould, A book of the Cevennes (1907)

The Visigoths took control of the western half of Gallia Narbonensis in 462 CE, a part known as Septimania which included Le Vigan, and they retained control despite attempts in 586 and 589 by the Frankish (Merovingian) King Guntram to conquer the area from the north. In 587 the region came under Catholic rule with the conversion of the Visigoth king Reccared I. In 719, the Moor Al-Samh conquered Septimania and the Franks struggled to take it back over the next several decades. By 780, Charlemagne had conquered the entire territory. Le Vigan is on the site of an ancient Roman town which may be "Vindomagus", but it is not certain. There is a spring called "la source d'Isis," which has provided water to the city since at least 1069 and which was named in honor of the Roman goddess. The town was destroyed during the Moorish invasion of Provence.

== Population ==
Historical population

Year	Pop.	±% p.a.
1793	3,852	—
1800	3,834	−0.07%
1806	3,983	+0.64%
1821	4,303	+0.52%
1831	4,909	+1.33%
1836	5,049	+0.56%
1841	4,938	−0.44%
1846	5,128	+0.76%
1851	4,993	−0.53%
1856	4,656	−1.39%
1861	5,376	+2.92%
1866	5,104	−1.03%
1872	5,024	−0.26%
1876	5,389	+1.77%
1881	5,268	−0.45%
1886	5,353	+0.32%
1891	5,374	+0.08%
1896	5,199	−0.66%
1901	5,126	−0.28%

Year	Pop.	±% p.a.
1906	4,595	−2.16%
1911	4,744	+0.64%
1921	4,221	−1.16%
1926	4,274	+0.25%
1931	4,278	+0.02%
1936	3,704	−2.84%
1946	3,676	−0.08%
1954	3,867	+0.64%
1962	4,111	+0.77%
1968	4,207	+0.39%
1975	4,293	+0.29%
1982	4,517	+0.73%
1990	4,523	+0.02%
1999	4,429	−0.23%
2007	4,011	−1.23%
2012	3,925	−0.43%
2017	3,820	−0.54%
2023	3,863	+0.19%

Source: EHESS and INSEE (1968-2023)

== Economy ==
As with many towns in the Cévennes, there were many textile industries there in the past. Several quarries south of town above Montdardier were formerly important sources of lithographic limestone. Stone from these quarries earned an honorable mention in the Great Exhibition of 1851.

Le Vigan is a tourist destination during summer time.

== Personalities ==
- Chevalier d'Assas (1733–1760) - A captain of the Régiment d'Auvergne famous for an account of his participation in the battle of Kloster Kampen during the Seven Years' War. He is often credited with sacrificing his life to alert his regiment to the presence of the English near their camp, with the phrase "To me, Auvergne! Here is the enemy!"
- Abraham Peyrenc de Moras (1684-1732) - Banker, born a commoner, rose to the nobility and died immensely wealthy. Built the Hôtel Biron in Paris which now houses the Musée Rodin.
- Caroline Proust Actress (1967-)
- Henri Quatrefages de La Roquette (1731–1824), Constituent
- Odette Teissier du Cros (1906-1997), founder and curator of Le Vigan's Musée cévenol
- Pierre Triaire (1771-1799) - soldier of the French Revolution

== Sights ==
- The musée cévenol shows the life in the Cévennes during the past centuries
- The Vieux Pont is an old bridge built during the 11th century
- The old hotel Faventines called Château d'Assas from 18th century
- The Arboretum de la Foux and Arboretum de l'Hort de Dieu are mature arboretums

== See also ==
- Communes of the Gard department
