= Jean Carrière =

French writer (1928–2005)

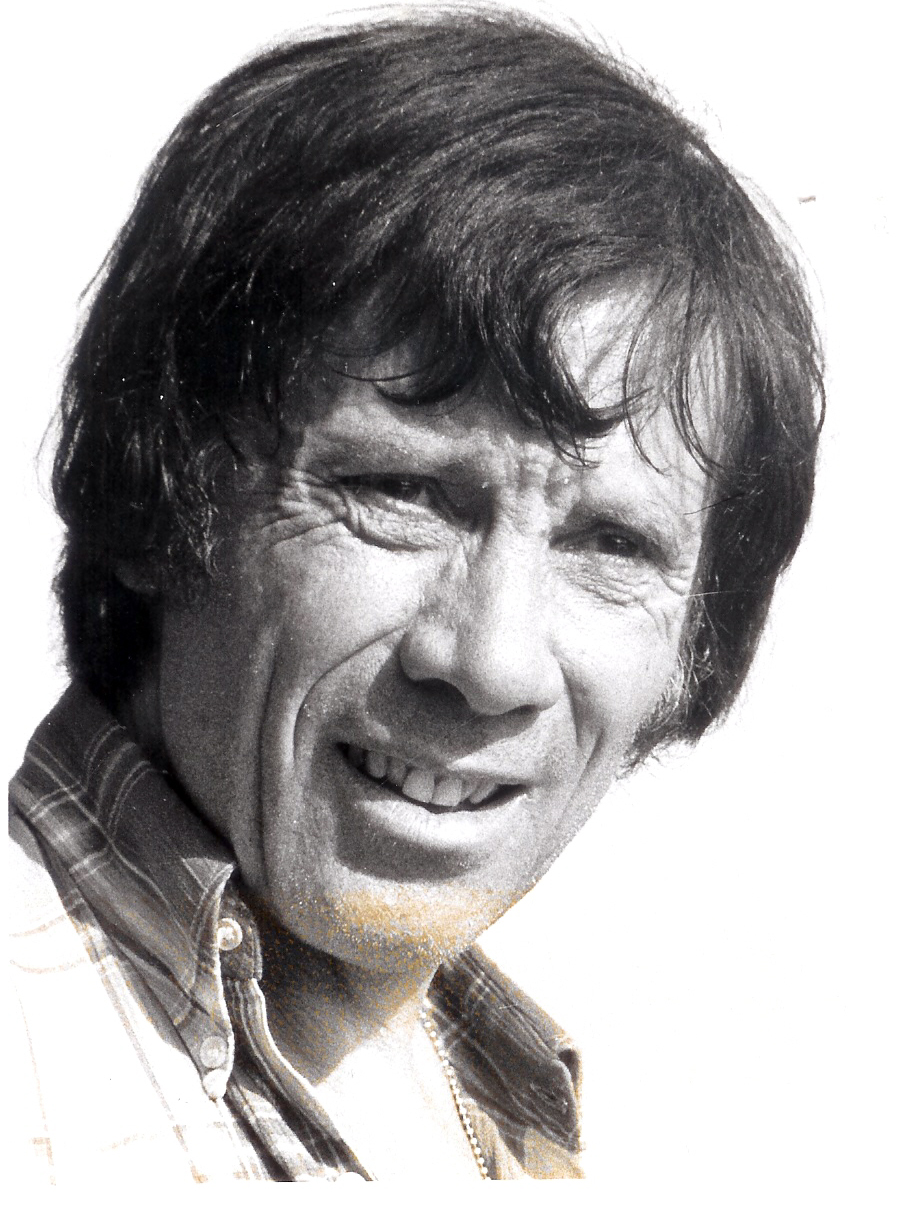

Jean Carrière (6 August 1928 – 7–8 May 2005) was a French writer.

== Life ==
Carrière was born in Nîmes. His mother, Andree Paoli, was originally from Cape Corsine. He was secretary to Jean Giono (on whom he wrote an essay) in Manosque, music critic in Paris, literary columnist at the ORTF. He began his career of writer with his novel Retour à Uzès in 1967, (Académie française prize). He has published twenty books, mainly novels.

Winner of the Prix Goncourt in 1972 for L'Épervier de Maheux, published by Jean-Jacques Pauvert, success (2 million copies, translated into 15 languages). His father was killed, crushed by a drunk driver, and he plunged into a depression, after a divorce.

He was passionate about music (his father was a conductor and his maternal grandfather, Toussaint Paoli, had a violin shop in Nîmes) and film (he met the actress Sigourney Weaver to whom he dedicated a book); he prepared a new novel and a book on Maurice Ravel.

After the huge success of his work, Épervier, he stayed away from the literary salons of Paris, and the media which had classified him a regionalist writer.

After a long stay in his cottage in Saint-Sauveur-Camprieu near Mont Aigoual, he lived for twenty years in a house at the foot of the vineyards, Domessargues, where his funeral took place on 11 May 2005.

== Legacy ==
Here is what is written by Jean François Carrière Veillerette and Fabrice Nicolino, in their book "Pesticides, révélations sur un scandale français" (Fayard, 2007 – p. 336) :

There are somewhere between Cévennes et Grand Causses, in a valley away from the world, a man born in 1926. His name is Jean. He continues, when we write these lines, to keep its small flock of sheep. As before, as ever since the Neolithic. Jean is a wonderful man who said no. In the 1960s, when all his neighbors equipped themselves, when they expanded their herds and their facilities, Jean said no. He was mocked, he was mocked, he was considered a laggard, or worse. He was right. One of the coauthors of this book, which has known him for years, still hears the cry of this man defeated but still standing, commenting on the fate of agriculture in France: "They destroyed everything." Jean was right: "they" were all destroyed. But life grows still under the ruins, forever and ever. Jean was right, Jean is a quiet hero who never makes the news. But Jean finally wrong: there will be a sequel. Long live Jean Carrière!

== Works ==
- Retour à Uzès, La Jeune Parque, 1967. reprint 1973
- L'Épervier de Maheux, La Presse, 1972, ISBN 978-0-7777-0032-7
- La Caverne des pestiférés, Paris, Pauvert, 1978–1979, 2 vol. ISBN 978-2-7202-0128-8
- Le Nez dans l'herbe, Paris, La Table ronde, 1981.
- Jean Giono, Paris, La Manufacture, 1985. reprint 1991, ISBN 978-2-7377-0282-2
- Les Années sauvages, Paris, Laffont/Pauvert, 1986, ISBN 978-2-221-04991-4
- Julien Gracq, Paris, La Manufacture, 1986.
- Le Prix d'un Goncourt, Paris, Laffont/Pauvert, 1987 (published as "Les Cendres de la gloire" aux Editions France Loisirs)
- L'Indifférence des étoiles, Paris, Laffont/Pauvert, 1994. reprint Pocket, 1996, ISBN 978-2-266-06557-3
- Sigourney Weaver, portrait and accomplished itinerary, Paris, La Martinière, 1994.
- Achigan, Paris, Laffont, 1995. reprint Pocket, 1998, ISBN 978-2-266-07313-4
- L'Empire des songes, Paris, Laffont, 1997, ISBN 978-2-221-07752-8
- Un jardin pour l'éternel, Paris, Laffont, 1999. ISBN 978-2-221-08540-0
- Le Fer dans la plaie, Paris, Laffont, 2000. ISBN 978-2-221-08541-7
- Feuilles d'or sur un torrent, Paris, Laffont, 2001. ISBN 978-2-84694-010-8
- Passions futiles, Paris, La Martinière, 2004. ISBN 978-2-84675-142-1
