= Odette Teissier du Cros =

French curator

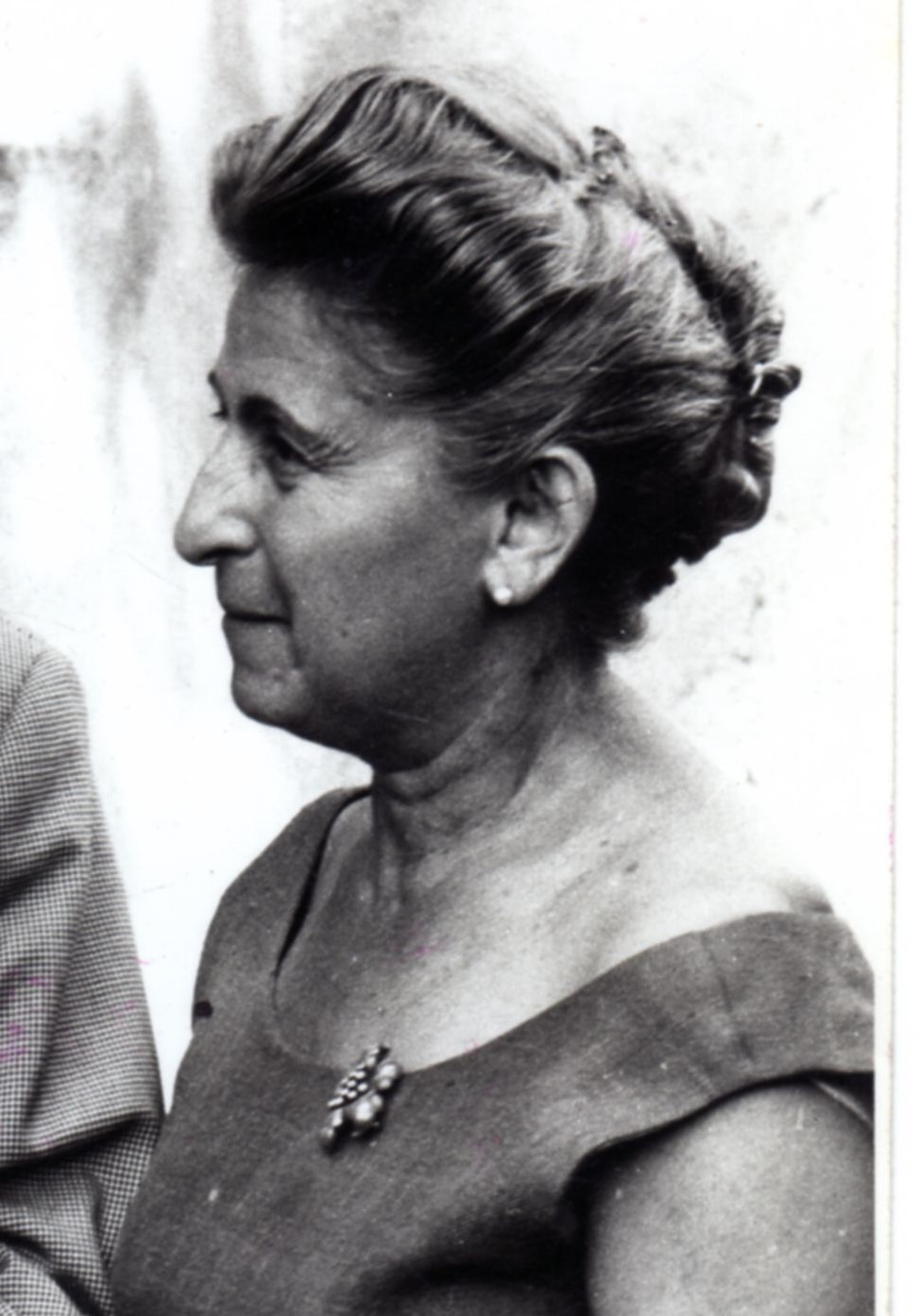
- (1963)
- Born: Odette Cololian; 1906
- Died: 30 January 1997 (aged 90–91)
- Education: École du Louvre
- Occupations: Ethnologist; curator
- Known for: Founder, Musée cévenol (Cévennes Museum)
- Spouse: Louis Teissier du Cros

Odette Teissier du Cros (née Cololian, 1906 – 30 January 1997) was a French ethnologist, who founded and was the first curator (1963–83) of the Musée cévenol (Cévennes Museum) in Le Vigan.

== Biography ==
Odette Cololian was the only daughter of Dr. Paul Cololian, a psychiatrist, the first adherent trained by Professor Jean-Martin Charcot at the Pitié-Salpêtrière Hospital in Paris. Initially planning to make a career in medicine, she turned later to ethnology, a new discipline at that time.

In 1922, she met Louis Teissier du Cros a native of Aulas, at Bois de Boulogne in Paris. The Teissier du Cros family members were silk spinners from the hamlet of Cros, Gard. The couple married shortly before World War II.

In 1936, she met with Charles Parain and Georges Henri Rivière, who were organizing the Musée national des Arts et Traditions Populaires Teissier attended École du Louvre and joined Rivière's museum team in 1937.

During the Occupation, she lived in Paris, and her husband being a prisoner in Germany (Oflag IV-D). In order to survive, she became a part of the folk art community. After the war, she regularly stayed in the Cévennes with her new family, at the Teissier du Cros house (in Aulas), and at the château de Coupiac (in Saint-Sauveur-Camprieu). Solicited by local personalities who wanted to create a museum in Le Vigan at the end of the 1950s, in 1959, Teissier met with René Bastide, the city's mayor, to discuss the creation of the Cévenol Museum, dedicated to the arts and popular traditions of the Cévennes, a project for which she very quickly obtained the decisive support of local personalities such as Adrienne Durand-Tullou and André Chamson.

In September 1961, the municipality of Le Vigan organized the exhibition Les anciennes techniques cévenoles (The old Cevennes techniques), its prelude to the opening of the Cévenol Museum, of which Teissier was the essential organizer. The Cévennes Museum was inaugurated on 5 September 1963, in the presence of several personalities including Georges Henri Rivière, André Chamson, and Claude Lévi-Strauss. With the assistance of Durand-Tullou, Teissler collected the objects that for the museum's collection, which include archaeology, ethnology, history, literature, and textiles pieces.

== Death and legacy ==
Odette Teissier du Cros died on 30 January 1997. In 2012, her personal archives were entrusted by her son, Patrick Teissier du Cros, to the Académie des Hauts Cantons. Biographical panels created in her honour were dedicated at the Cévenol Museum on 26 July 2013.

== Awards and honours ==
- Knight, Legion of Honour, 26 February 1978
- Knight, Ordre des Arts et des Lettres, 8 February 1968
- Medal, Club cévenol, 10 September 1972
- Corresponding member, Académie de Nîmes, 8 June 1978

== Selected works ==
- Le Musée cévenol : Le Vigan, Gard, Le Vigan, Musée cévenol, 1980
