= Arboretum de l'Hort de Dieu =

Arboretum in France

Coordinates: 44.11896°N 3.58453°E

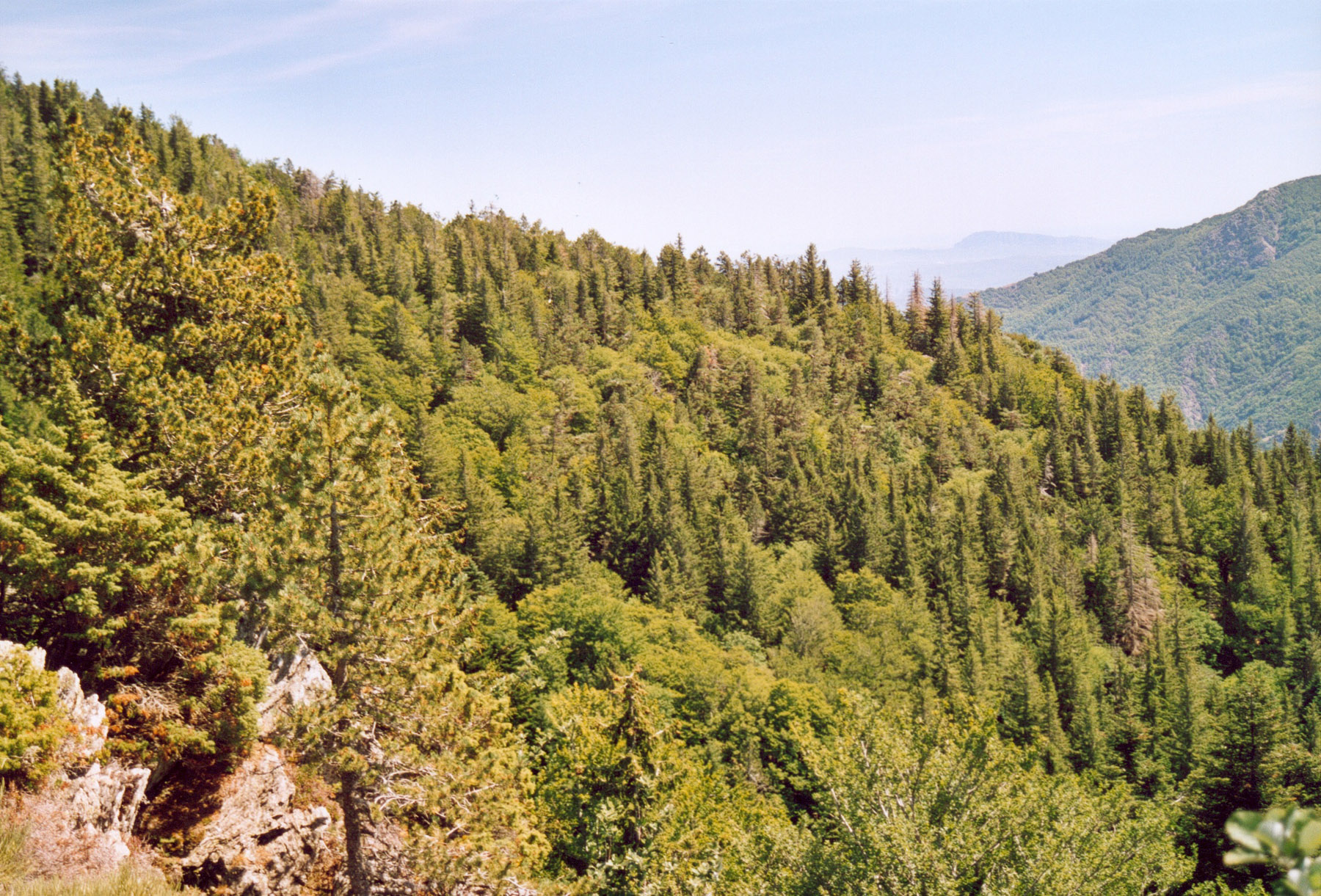
Arboretum de l'Hort de Dieu

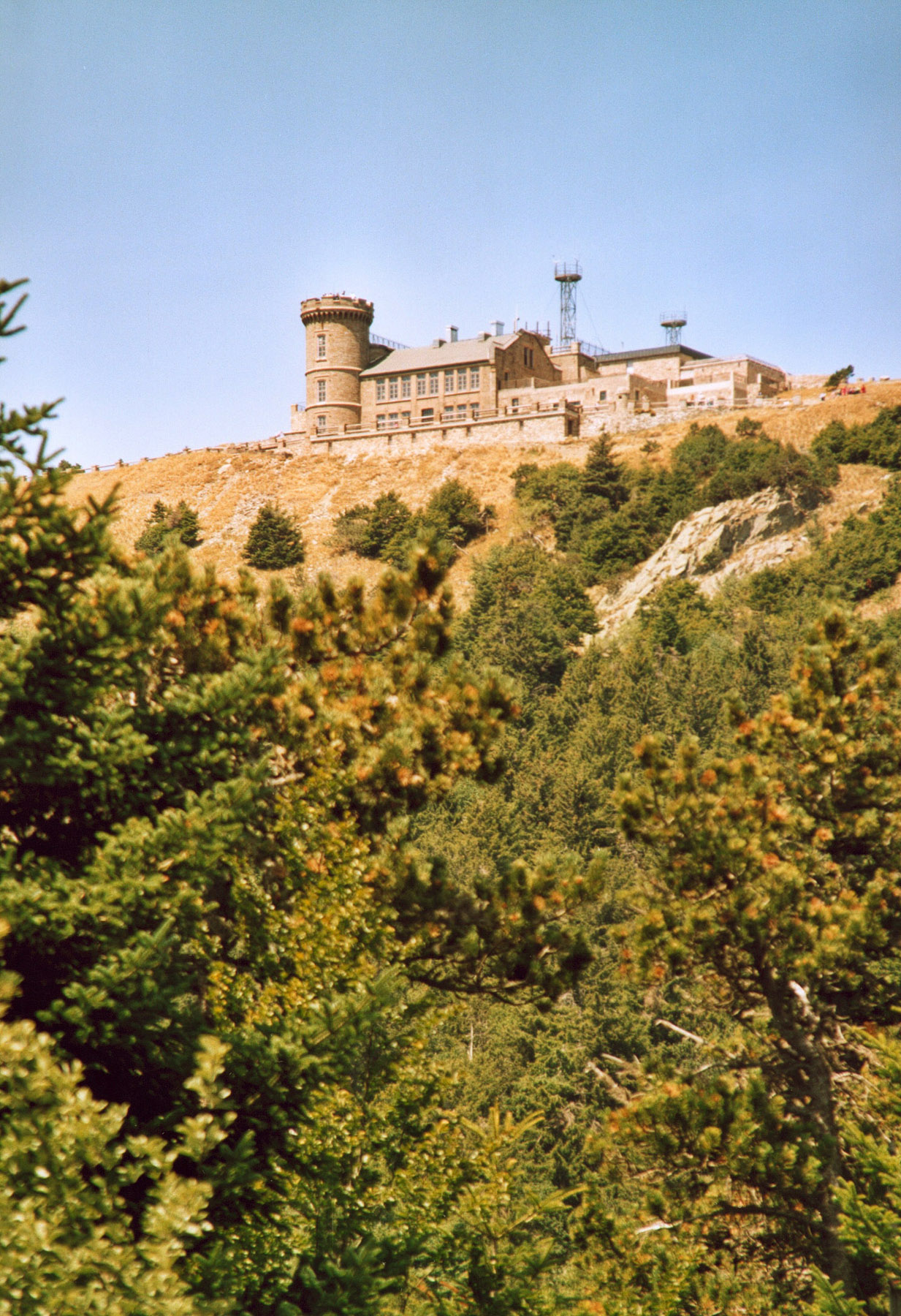
Arboretum de l'Hort de Dieu

The Arboretum de l'Hort de Dieu is an arboretum on the southern flank of Mont Aigoual, about 39 km (24 mi) north of Le Vigan, Gard, Languedoc-Roussillon, France, at the border of Gard and Lozère. It is open daily without charge.

The arboretum was created in 1902 by Charles Henri Marie Flahault (1852–1935) and Georges Fabre to help reduce the effects of excessive grazing and timber production. It was planted with spruce, larch, black pine, etc. and is accessible via a hiking path from the Observatoire de l'Aigoual.

== See also ==
- List of botanical gardens in France
