= Georges Fabre =

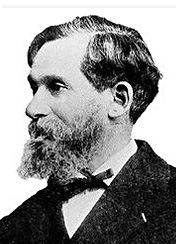
- Born: 6 June 1844; Orléans, France
- Died: 21 May 1911 (aged 66); Nîmes, France
- Education: École polytechnique French National School of Forestry
- Engineering career
- Discipline: Forestry
- Employer: Administration des Eaux et Forêts
- Projects: Forêt domaniale de l'Aigoual; Arboretum de l'Hort de Dieu; Arboretum de la Foux; Arboretum de Puéchagut

Georges Fabre (French pronunciation: [ʒɔʁʒ fabʁ]; 6 June 1844 – 21 May 1911) was a French forestry engineer, now best known for his role in creation of the Forêt Domaniale de l'Aigoual (Aigoual State Forest) and the weather observatory atop Mont Aigoual.

Fabre was born in Orléans, studied at the École polytechnique and the French National School of Forestry in Nancy, from which he graduated in 1868. From 1868-1875 he served as Guard General of Water and Forests in Dijon, then in Mende, after which he was named sub-inspector, then inspector, at Alès. As Gard's reforestation director until 1900, his major achievement was the development of the Forêt Domaniale de l'Aigoual and establishment of the meteorological observatory on its summit. In 1900 he was appointed curator of Forestry in Nîmes, which post he held until his retirement in 1909.

He died in 1911 in Nîmes.

Today the Forêt Domaniale de l'Aigoual extends across about 15,000 hectares, of which 11,000 are in Gard and the remainder in Lozère.

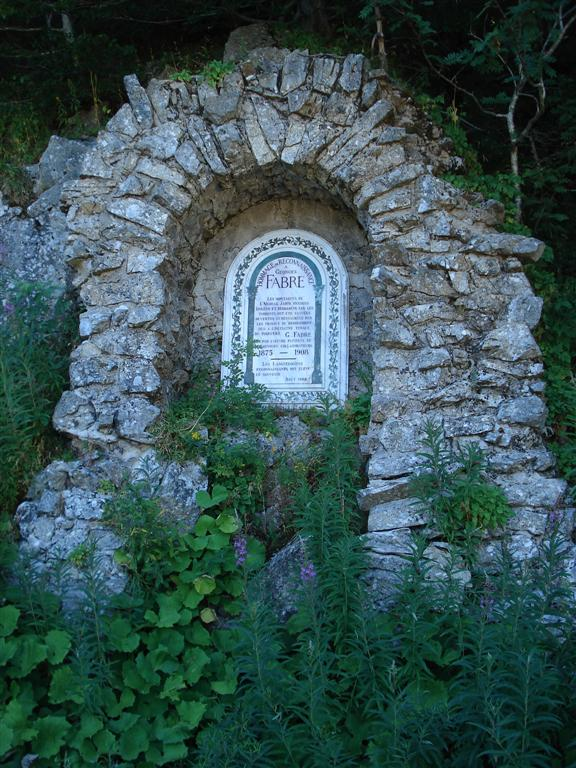
Memorial tablet

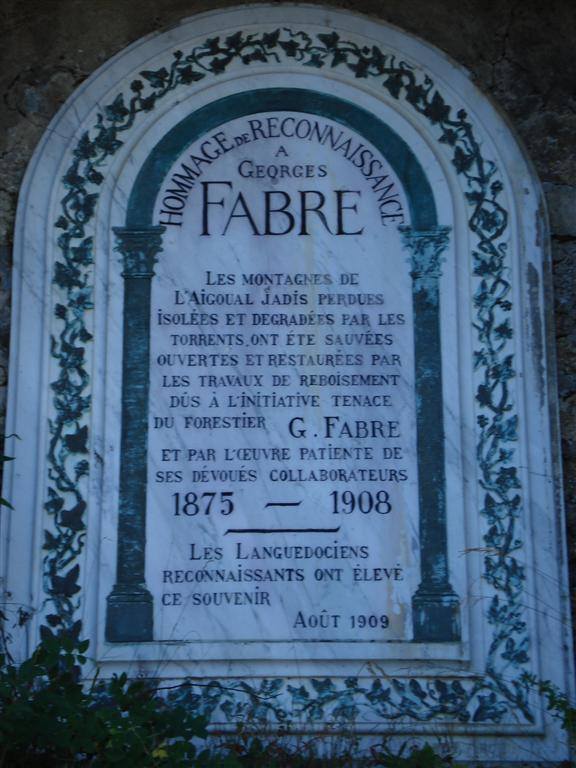
Tablet detail

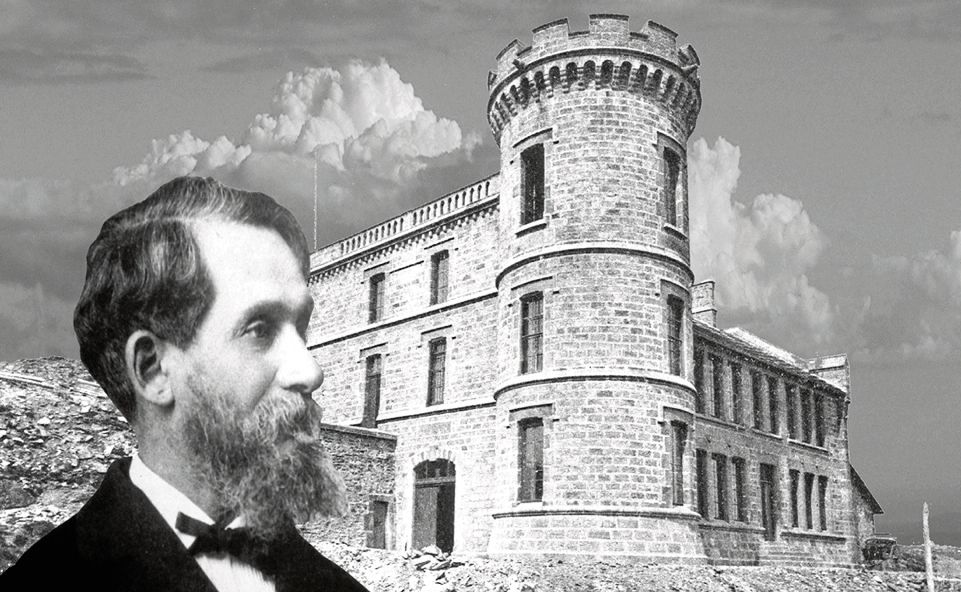
French commemorative stamps

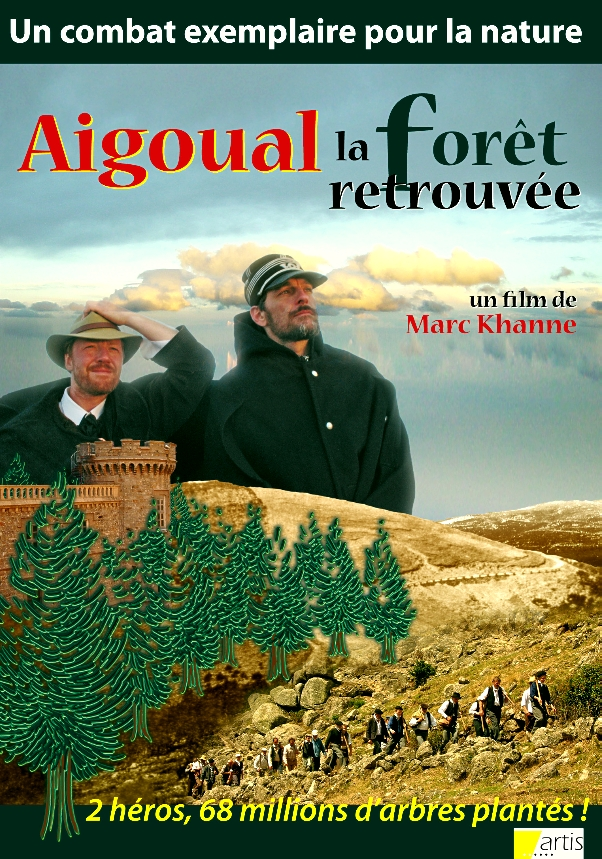
Documentary film poster Aigoual la forêt retrouvée
