= Lanuéjols =

Lanuéjols is the name of two communes in France:

- Lanuéjols, in the Gard department
- Lanuéjols, in the Lozère department
