= Breau =

Breau may refer to:

== People ==
- Edgar Breau, Canadian solo musician, also member of Hamilton-based band Simply Saucer in the 1970s
- Herb Breau (born 1944), Canadian businessman and politician
- Jean-François Breau (born 1978), Canadian singer-songwriter of Acadian origin
- Lenny Breau (1941–1984), American guitarist and music educator. Also his self-titled album
- George Breau (1940–2017) American artist from Massachusetts.

== Places ==
- Bréau, commune in the Seine-et-Marne department in the Île-de-France region in north-central France
- Bréau-et-Salagosse, commune in the Gard department in southern France
