= Mars, Gard =

Mars
- Part of Bréau-Mars
- Coat of arms
- Location of Mars
- Location within France Location within Occitanie
- Coordinates: 44°00′02″N 3°33′28″E
- Country: France
- Region: Occitania
- Department: Gard
- Arrondissement: Le Vigan
- Canton: Le Vigan
- Commune: Bréau-Mars
- Area^{1}: 3.80 km^{2} (1.47 sq mi)
- Elevation: 300 m (980 ft)
- Highest elevation: 1,168 m (3,832 ft)
- Lowest elevation: 345 m (1,132 ft)
- Population (2019): 165
  - Density: 43.4/km^{2} (112/sq mi)
- Time zone: UTC+01:00 (CET)
  - Summer (DST): UTC+02:00 (CEST)
- Postal code: 30120
- ^{1} French Land Register data, which excludes lakes, ponds, glaciers > 1 km^{2} (0.386 sq mi or 247 acres) and river estuaries.

Mars (Languedocien: Març) is a former commune in the Gard department in southern France. On 1 January 2019, it was merged into the new commune Bréau-Mars.

== See also ==
- Communes of the Gard department
