= Bréau-Mars =

Commune in Occitanie, France

- Commune
- Location of Bréau-Mars
- Location within France Location within Occitanie
- Coordinates: 43°59′26″N 3°34′18″E
- Country: France
- Region: Occitania
- Department: Gard
- Arrondissement: Le Vigan
- Canton: Le Vigan
- Intercommunality: Pays Viganais

Government
  - Mayor (2020–2026): Alain Durand
- Area^{1}: 28.49 km^{2} (11.00 sq mi)
- Highest elevation: 1,402 m (4,600 ft)
- Lowest elevation: 264 m (866 ft)
- Population (2023): 689
  - Density: 24.2/km^{2} (62.6/sq mi)
- Time zone: UTC+01:00 (CET)
  - Summer (DST): UTC+02:00 (CEST)
- INSEE/Postal code: 30052 /30120
- ^{1} French Land Register data, which excludes lakes, ponds, glaciers > 1 km^{2} (0.386 sq mi or 247 acres) and river estuaries.

Bréau-Mars is a commune in the Gard department in southern France. It was established on 1 January 2019 by the merger of the former communes of Bréau-et-Salagosse (the seat) and Mars.

== See also ==
- Communes of the Gard department
