= Nicolas-Louis d'Assas =

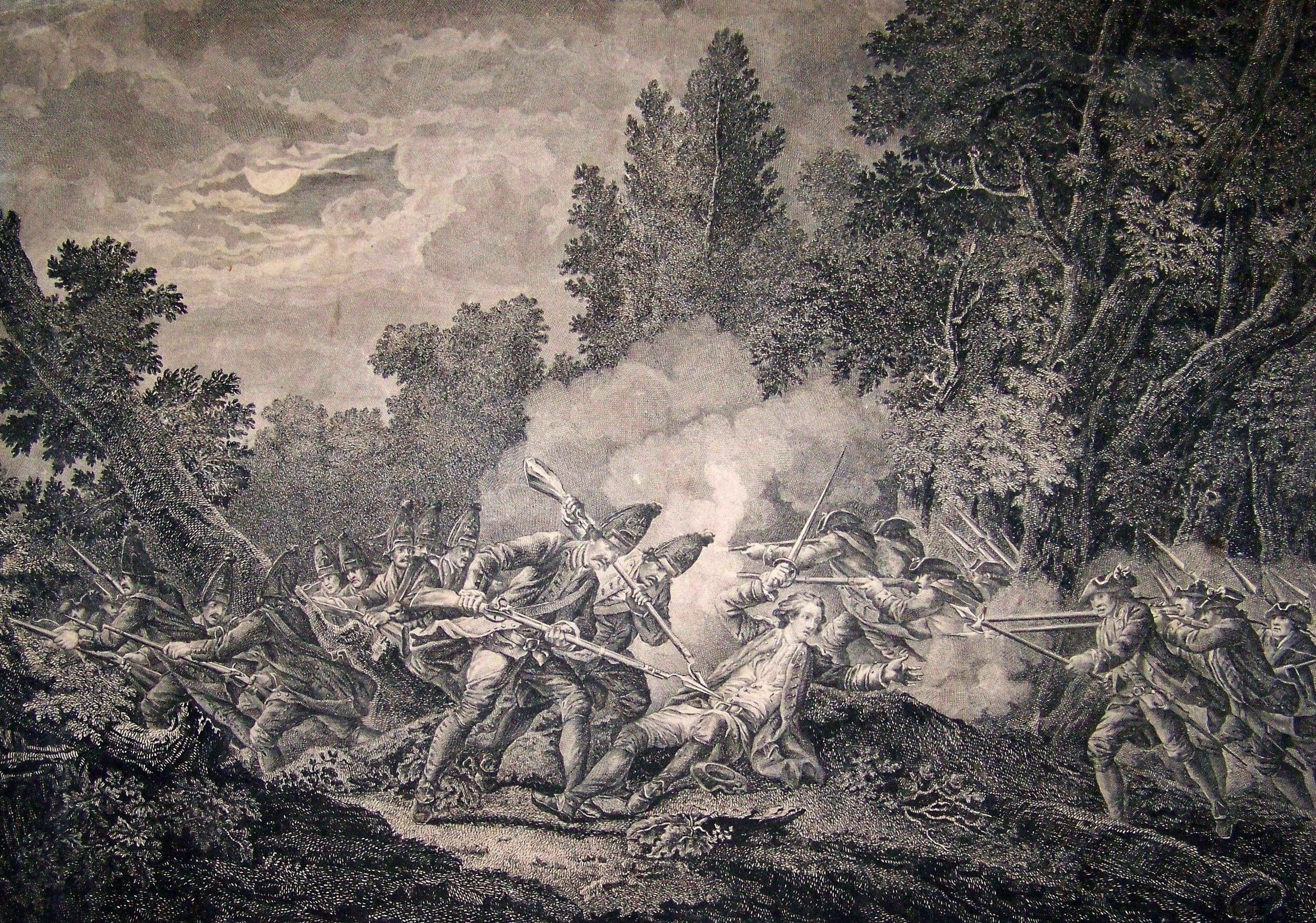
Death of d'Assas the night before the Battle of Kloster Kampen

Captain Nicolas-Louis d'Assas (1733 – 14 October 1760), also known as Louis d'Assas du Mercou and Chevalier d'Assas, was a French Royal Army officer who served in the Seven Years' War. He was born in Le Vigan, Languedoc in 1733. Having entered a wood to reconnoitre it the night before the 1760 Battle of Kloster Kampen, d'Assas was suddenly surrounded by enemy grenadiers. With bayonets at his breast, he allegedly cried out, "To me, Auvergne! Here is the enemy!" D'Assas was killed instantly, but fellow French troops managed to drive off the enemy forces. The Rue d'Assas in the 6th arrondissement of Paris was named after him.
