= Arboretum de Puéchagut =

Arboretum in Languedoc-Roussillon, France

Coordinates: 43.9906°N 3.5717°E

The Arboretum de Puéchagut is an arboretum located near Bréau-et-Salagosse, Gard, Languedoc-Roussillon, France. It is open daily without charge.

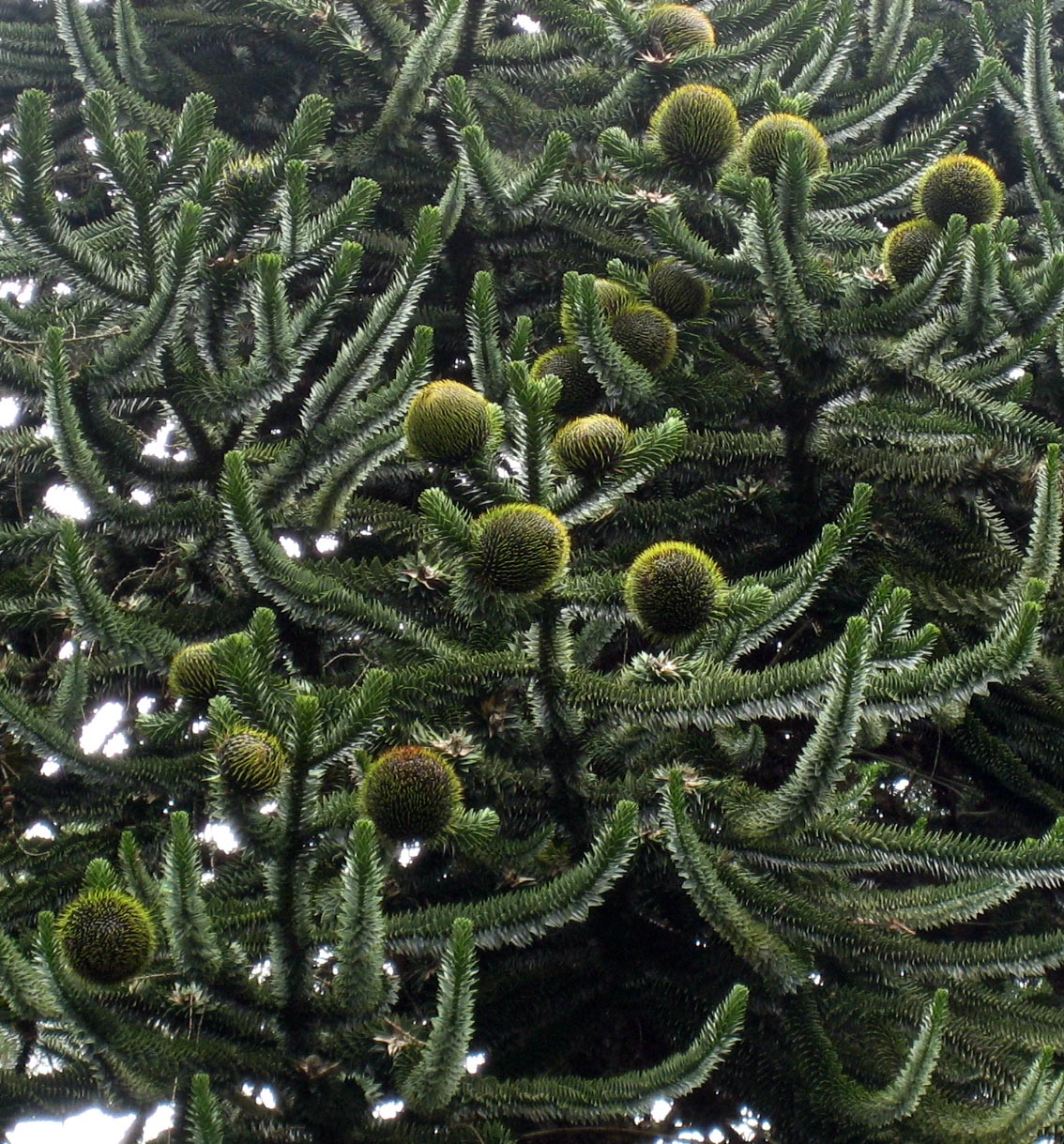
Arboretum de Puéchagut

The arboretum was created in 1890 by Charles Henri Marie Flahault (1852–1935) and Georges Fabre as an experimental station for studying the reforestation of the Forêt Domaniale de l'Aigoual with exotic species. It contains hiking paths and mature trees including araucaria and Sequoiadendron giganteum

== See also ==
- List of botanical gardens in France
