= Battle of Kloster Kampen =

1760 battle of the Seven Years' War

- Part of the Seven Years' War
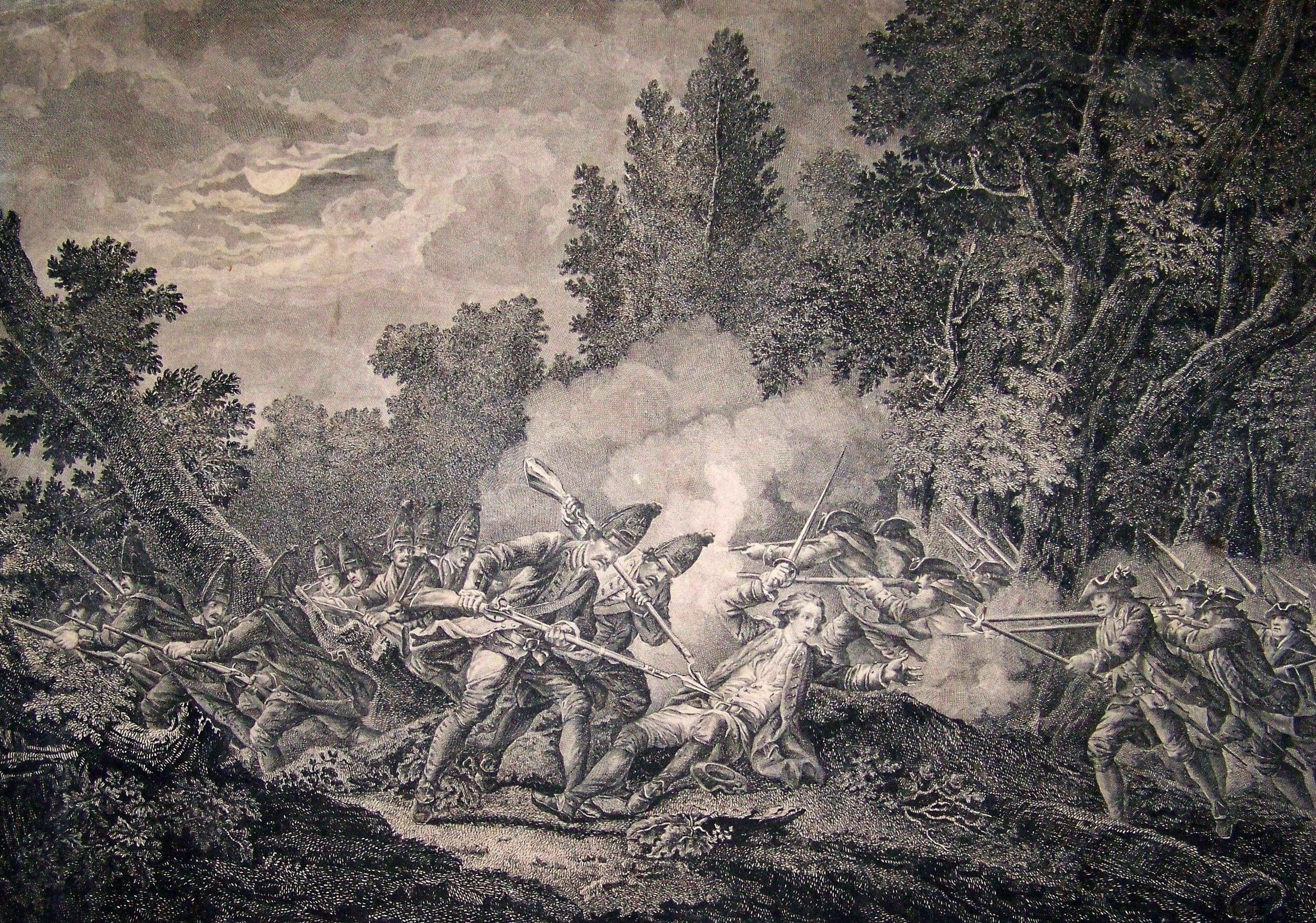
- The death of Nicolas-Louis d'Assas on the night of 14 October
Date	15 October 1760
Location	Kloster Kampen, present-day Germany 51.5022°N 6.5161°E
Result	French victory

Belligerents
Great Britain (Province of Hanover) Hanover; Hesse-Kassel; Brunswick-Wolfenbüttel; Prussia	France

Commanders and leaders
Duke of Brunswick	Marquis de Castries Comte de Rochambeau

Strength
26,000	25,000

Casualties and losses
1,628 killed or wounded 1,600 captured	2,036 casualties

The Battle of Kloster Kampen (also known as the Battle of Kloster Kamp or Battle of Campen) was a French victory over an Anglo-German army during the Seven Years' War. The Allied forces were driven from the field.

== Prelude ==
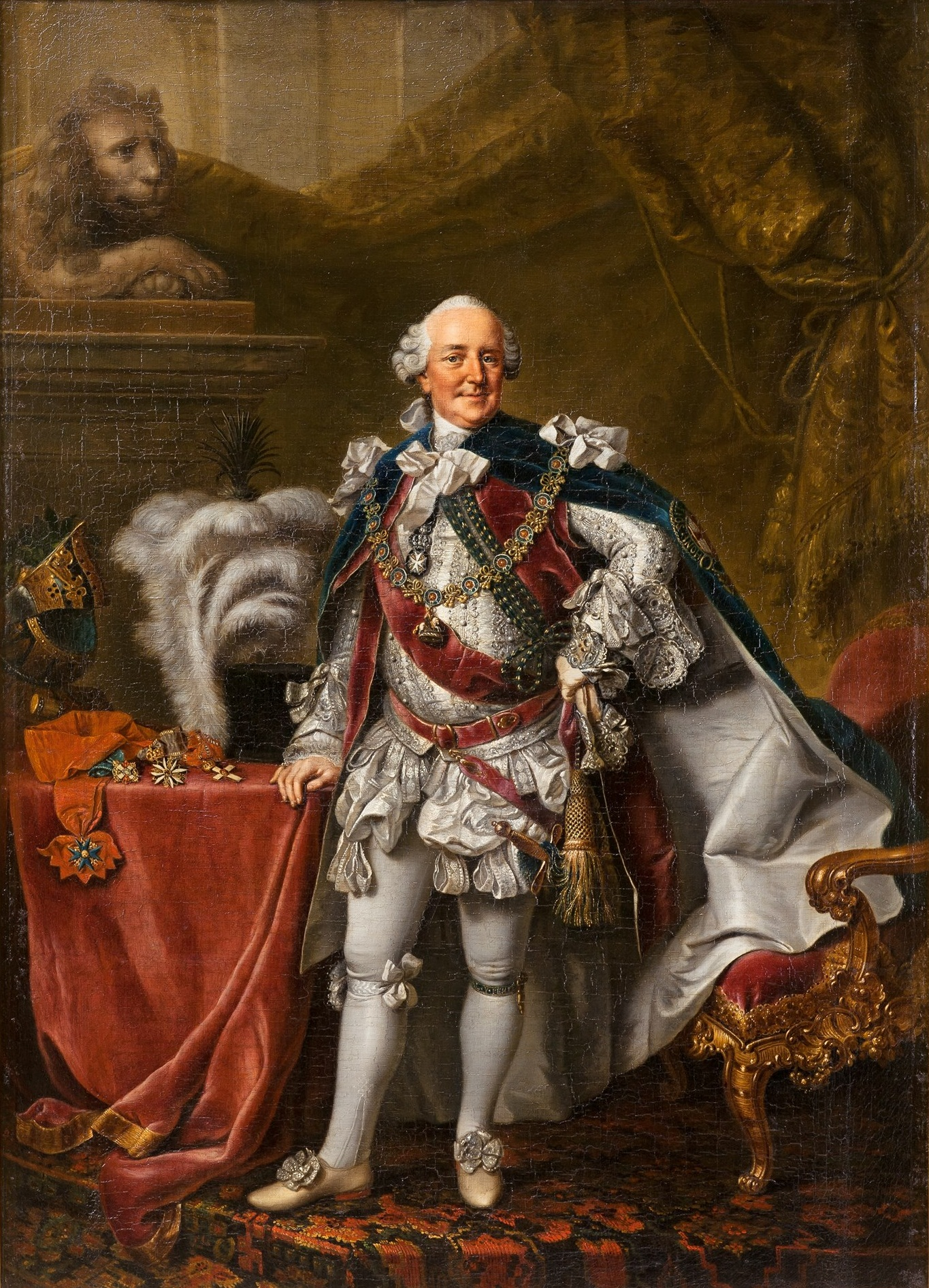
Erbprinz Charles William Ferdinand of Brunswick.

During the autumn of 1760 Duke Ferdinand of Brunswick, the commander of the allied army saw the French were threatening Hanover. To create a diversion he dispatched a 20,000 men command by the Erbprinz of Brunswick to draw the French army away and to the west. The French commander prepared to defend the town of Wesel on the east bank of the Rhine burning the bridge over the Rhine at the mouth of the Lippe while Marquis de Castries hurried with extra reinforcements to relieve the garrison.

The Prince of Brunswick set up a formal siege of Wesel building two pontoon bridges over the river. He resolved to meet de Castries' army round the Kloster Kampen area west of the river. Major General George Augustus Eliott commanded the approach vanguard, 2 squadrons of Prussian Hussars, the Royal Dragoons, the Inniskilling Dragoons along with the 87th and 88th Highlanders. The main attacking force comprised 2 battalions of grenadiers, the 20th Foot, the 23rd Royal Welch Fusiliers, the 25th Foot, 2 battalions of Hanoverians and 2 battalions of Hessians.

Behind the main body of the army was a force of cavalry, the 10th Dragoons and 10 squadrons of Hanoverian and Hessian cavalry. A reserve force of the 11th, 33rd and 51st Foot with 5 Hessian battalions lay some miles behind the main body of the army.

== Battle ==
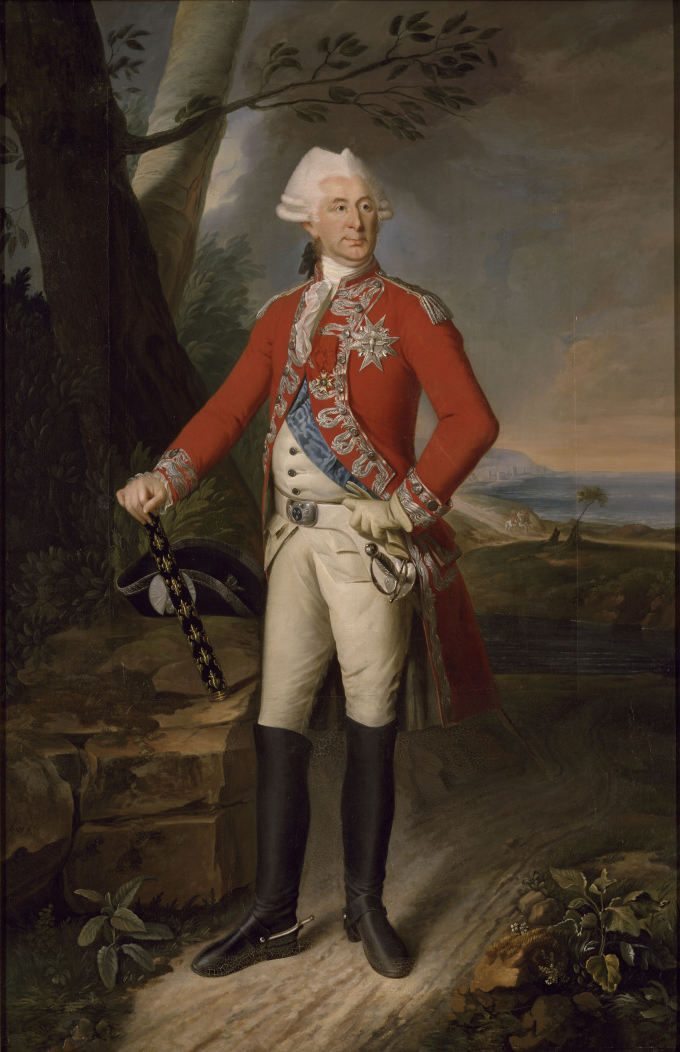
Marquis de Castries

The battle began in the middle of the night when the army's vanguard drove the French out of Kloster Kampen convent and took the bridge over the canal. The sounds of the guns as the French resisted the attack alerted the main body of the French army of the attack. Dawn broke as the British and German Foot regiments moved into the attack, the Highlander regiments outflanking the French army which drove the French back.

The Marquis de Castries brought up his reserves and rallied the retreating regiments then launched a counter-offensive against the allied foot. The French attack broke up the formation of the British and German regiments. The French drove back the British and German regiments back across the canal. The allied reserves were brought up but due to the lengthy distance this took time and the French pressed their assault.

At the western end of the canal, Eliott led the three British cavalry regiments in a charge which disrupted the French advance and enabled the retreating allied foot to regain the North bank. The reserves formed a cordon which allowed the retreating allied foot to re-form. It was at this point which the Prince of Brunswick ordered the allies to retreat over the Rhine. However, upon reaching the river he discovered that the pontoon bridge needed for his crossing had been swept away and two days were needed to effect the crossing. The French did not follow up on their success, permitting the allies to complete their retreat over the Rhine.

== Aftermath ==
The Allied defeat caused disappointment in Britain where many had expected better news, following the large expansion of Frederick's army. It led some to question Ferdinand's leadership of the Allied army, although Ferdinand had been leading an outnumbered force during the campaign and would go on to win further victories at Warburg, Vellinghausen, and Wilhelmsthal, successfully defending Hanover from invasion.

== See also ==
- Nicolas-Louis d'Assas

== Literature ==
- Geschichte des Siebenjährigen Krieges in einer Reihe von Vorlesungen, mit Benutzung authentischer Quellen, bearbeitet von den Offizieren des großen Generalstabs, Vierter Theil: Der Feldzug von 1760, als Manuscript zum Gebrauche der Armee abgedruckt, Berlin 1834; p. 386ff. online at google books S. 416ff
- Clodfelter, M. (2017). Warfare and Armed Conflicts: A Statistical Encyclopedia of Casualty and Other Figures, 1492-2015 (4th ed.). Jefferson, North Carolina: McFarland. ISBN 978-0-7864-7470-7.
