= Lanuéjols, Gard =

Lanuéjols
- Commune
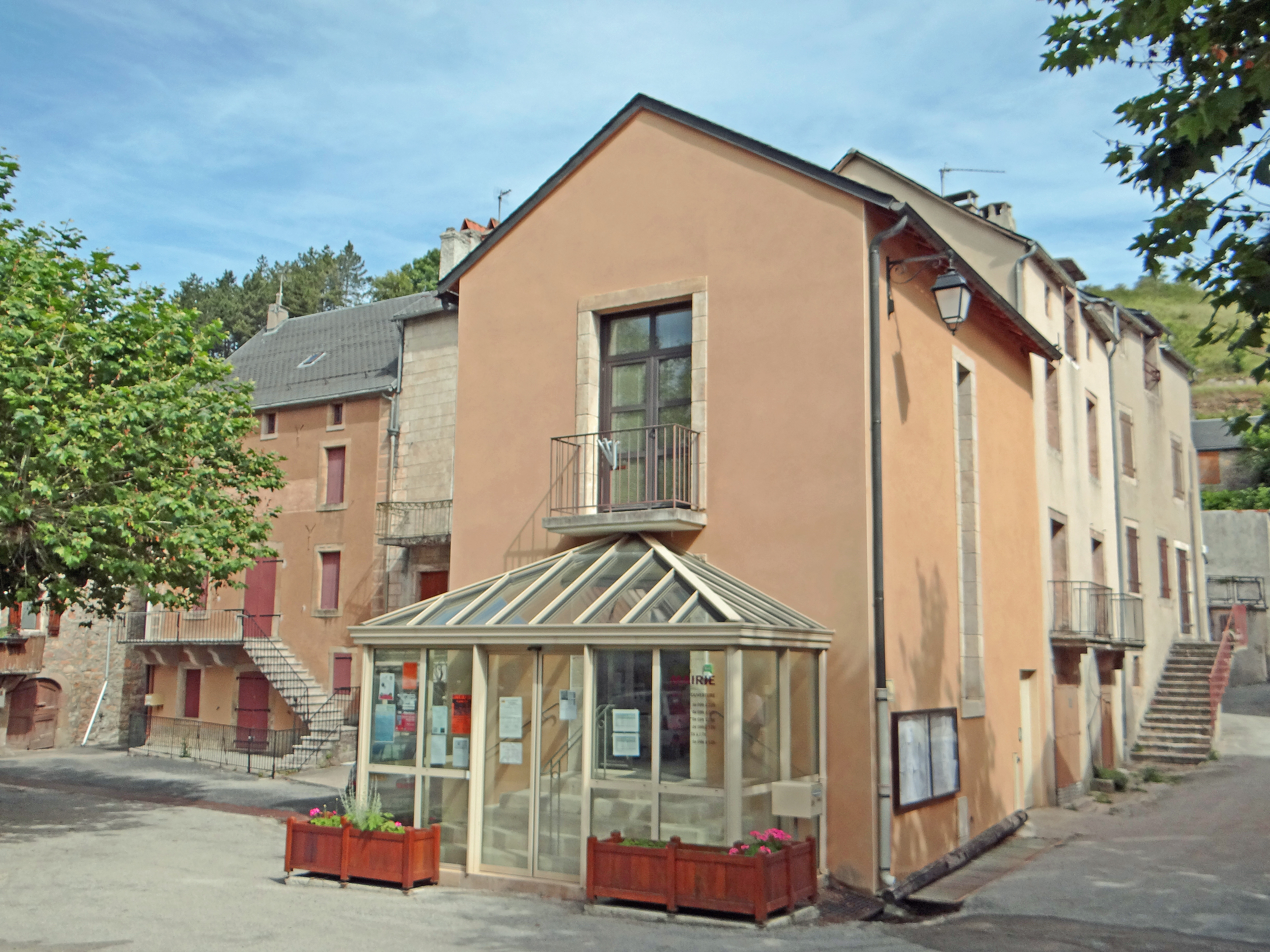
- The town hall of Lanuéjols

- Coat of arms
- Location of Lanuéjols
- Location within France Location within Occitanie
- Coordinates: 44°07′54″N 3°23′05″E
- Country: France
- Region: Occitania
- Department: Gard
- Arrondissement: Le Vigan
- Canton: Le Vigan

Government
  - Mayor (2020–2026): Alexandre Vigne
- Area^{1}: 62.43 km^{2} (24.10 sq mi)
- Elevation: 903 m (2,963 ft)
- Highest elevation: 1,187 m (3,894 ft)
- Lowest elevation: 614 m (2,014 ft)
- Population (2023): 341
  - Density: 5.46/km^{2} (14.1/sq mi)
- Time zone: UTC+01:00 (CET)
  - Summer (DST): UTC+02:00 (CEST)
- INSEE/Postal code: 30139 /30750
- ^{1} French Land Register data, which excludes lakes, ponds, glaciers > 1 km^{2} (0.386 sq mi or 247 acres) and river estuaries.

Lanuéjols (French pronunciation: [lanɥeʒɔl]; Occitan: Lanuèjols) is a commune in the Gard department in southern France.

== Population ==
Historical population
Year	Pop.	±% p.a.
1968	379	—
1975	337	−1.66%
1982	312	−1.10%
1990	304	−0.32%
1999	330	+0.92%
2007	326	−0.15%
2012	358	+1.89%
2017	357	−0.06%
2023	341	−0.76%
Source: INSEE

== See also ==
- Communes of the Gard department
- Arboretum de la Foux
