= Arboretum de la Foux =

Arboretum in France

Coordinates: 44.13°N 3.384°E

The Arboretum de la Foux, also known as the Arboretum de Saint-Sauveur-des-Pourcils, is a 10-hectare arboretum located within the Forêt de l'Aigoual, on the territory of the commune of Lanuéjols, near Saint-Sauveur-Camprieu, northwest of Le Vigan, Gard, Languedoc-Roussillon, France. It is open daily without charge.

The arboretum was created 1900-1910 for experimental introduction of foreign species into France. Scientific efforts ceased in 1963, and it has subsequently been maintained for educational purposes by the Office national des forêts. The site is on a southwest slope between 900 and 1500 metres altitude in an environment very conducive to forest vegetation; some trees reach heights that are records for Europe.

The arboretum's softwood collections include Abies cephalonica, Abies concolor, Abies grandis, Araucaria, Atlas Cedar, Nordmann Fir, European Larch and Japanese Larch, Pinus laricio; common Spruce, Oriental Spruce, Sitka Spruce, Picea pungens, and Engelmann Spruce; and Sequoia, Thuja plicata, and Tsuga heterophylla. Its hardwoods include ash, beech, birch, cherry, chestnut, red oak, and sycamore.

== See also ==
- List of botanical gardens in France
