= Bréau-et-Salagosse =

- Part of Bréau-Mars
- Coat of arms
- Location of Bréau-et-Salagosse
- Location within France Location within Occitanie
- Coordinates: 43°59′26″N 3°34′18″E
- Country: France
- Region: Occitania
- Department: Gard
- Arrondissement: Le Vigan
- Canton: Le Vigan
- Commune: Bréau-Mars
- Area^{1}: 24.69 km^{2} (9.53 sq mi)
- Elevation: 400 m (1,300 ft)
- Highest elevation: 1,402 m (4,600 ft)
- Lowest elevation: 264 m (866 ft)
- Population (2019): 478
  - Density: 19.4/km^{2} (50.1/sq mi)
- Time zone: UTC+01:00 (CET)
  - Summer (DST): UTC+02:00 (CEST)
- Postal code: 30120
- ^{1} French Land Register data, which excludes lakes, ponds, glaciers > 1 km^{2} (0.386 sq mi or 247 acres) and river estuaries.

Bréau-et-Salagosse (French pronunciation: [bʁeo e salaɡɔs]; Languedocien: Brèu e Salagòssa) is a former commune in the Gard department in southern France. On 1 January 2019, it was merged into the new commune Bréau-Mars.

== Sights ==
- Arboretum de Puéchagut

== See also ==
- Communes of the Gard department
