= Saint-Sauveur-Camprieu =

- Commune
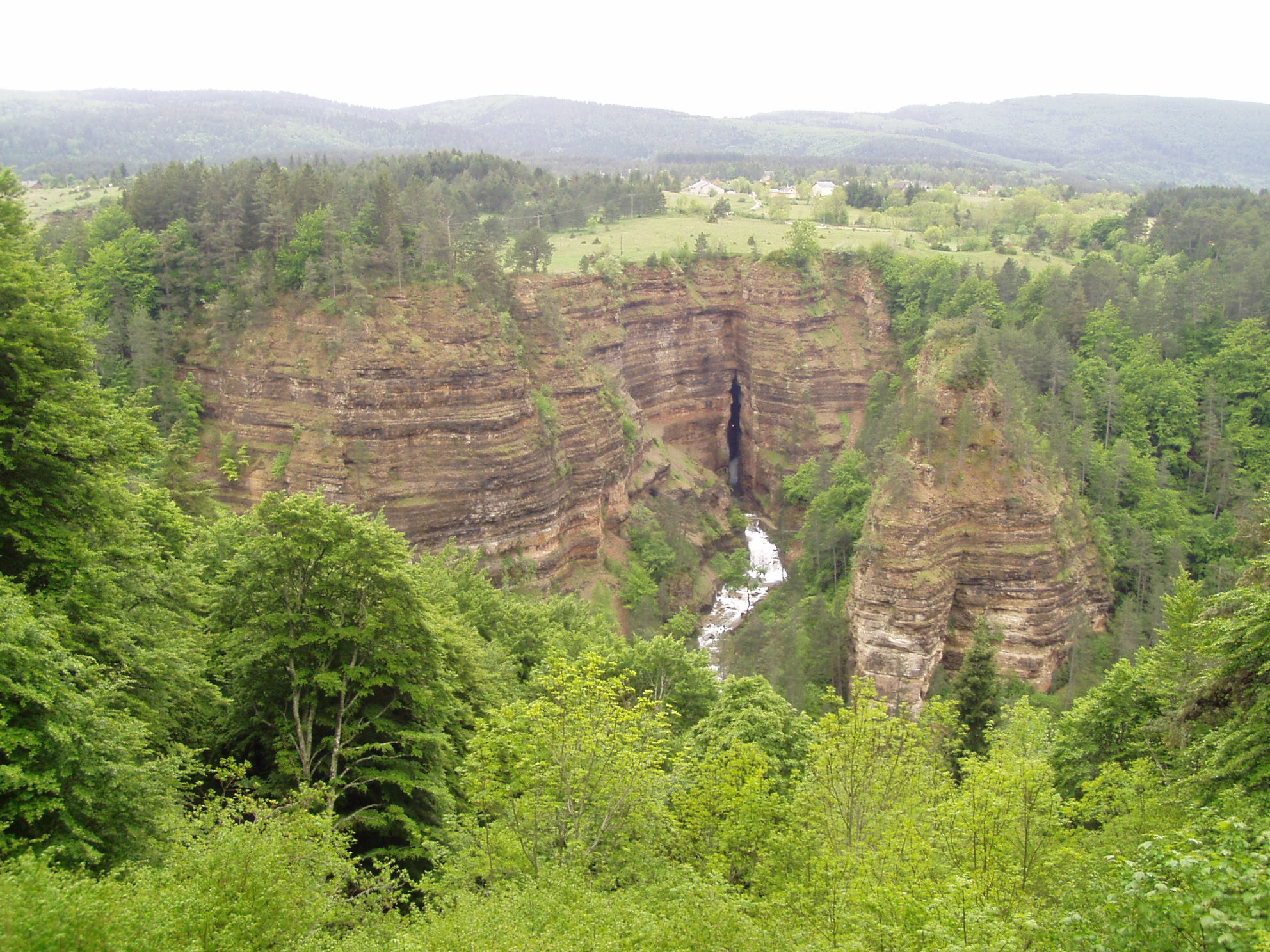
- Bramabiau Abyss

- Coat of arms
- Location of Saint-Sauveur-Camprieu
- Location within France Location within Occitanie
- Coordinates: 44°07′00″N 3°28′41″E
- Country: France
- Region: Occitania
- Department: Gard
- Arrondissement: Le Vigan
- Canton: Le Vigan

Government
  - Mayor (2020–2026): Nicole Amasse
- Area^{1}: 31.74 km^{2} (12.25 sq mi)
- Elevation: 1,112 m (3,648 ft)
- Highest elevation: 1,402 m (4,600 ft)
- Lowest elevation: 783 m (2,569 ft)
- Population (2023): 207
  - Density: 6.52/km^{2} (16.9/sq mi)
- Time zone: UTC+01:00 (CET)
  - Summer (DST): UTC+02:00 (CEST)
- INSEE/Postal code: 30297 /30750
- ^{1} French Land Register data, which excludes lakes, ponds, glaciers > 1 km^{2} (0.386 sq mi or 247 acres) and river estuaries.

Saint-Sauveur-Camprieu (French pronunciation: [sɛ̃ sovœʁ kɑ̃pʁijø]; Occitan: Sent Sauvaire e Camriu, before 1987: Saint-Sauveur-des-Pourcils) is a commune in the Gard department in southern France.

== Geography ==
=== Climate ===
Saint-Sauveur-Camprieu has an oceanic climate (Köppen climate classification Cfb) closely bordering on a warm-summer Mediterranean climate (Csb). The average annual temperature in Saint-Sauveur-Camprieu is 8.6 °C (47.5 °F). The average annual rainfall is 1,474.9 mm (58.07 in) with November as the wettest month. The temperatures are highest on average in July, at around 17.0 °C (62.6 °F), and lowest in January, at around 1.2 °C (34.2 °F). The highest temperature ever recorded in Saint-Sauveur-Camprieu was 35.5 °C (95.9 °F) on 28 June 2019; the coldest temperature ever recorded was −18.1 °C (−0.6 °F) on 1 March 2005.

Climate data for Saint-Sauveur-Camprieu (1991−2020 normals, extremes 1998−present)
Month	Jan	Feb	Mar	Apr	May	Jun	Jul	Aug	Sep	Oct	Nov	Dec	Year
Record high °C (°F)	20.2 (68.4)	21.5 (70.7)	22.4 (72.3)	25.5 (77.9)	29.3 (84.7)	35.5 (95.9)	33.3 (91.9)	34.4 (93.9)	28.7 (83.7)	26.7 (80.1)	21.6 (70.9)	22.6 (72.7)	35.5 (95.9)
Mean daily maximum °C (°F)	4.8 (40.6)	5.3 (41.5)	8.9 (48.0)	12.0 (53.6)	15.8 (60.4)	20.9 (69.6)	23.3 (73.9)	23.2 (73.8)	18.9 (66.0)	14.1 (57.4)	8.2 (46.8)	5.8 (42.4)	13.4 (56.1)
Daily mean °C (°F)	1.2 (34.2)	1.3 (34.3)	4.3 (39.7)	7.1 (44.8)	10.7 (51.3)	15.0 (59.0)	17.0 (62.6)	17.0 (62.6)	13.3 (55.9)	9.7 (49.5)	4.7 (40.5)	2.1 (35.8)	8.6 (47.5)
Mean daily minimum °C (°F)	−2.5 (27.5)	−2.8 (27.0)	−0.3 (31.5)	2.2 (36.0)	5.6 (42.1)	9.0 (48.2)	10.8 (51.4)	10.8 (51.4)	7.7 (45.9)	5.3 (41.5)	1.1 (34.0)	−1.6 (29.1)	3.8 (38.8)
Record low °C (°F)	−15.7 (3.7)	−15.9 (3.4)	−18.1 (−0.6)	−9.9 (14.2)	−3.2 (26.2)	−1.8 (28.8)	−0.5 (31.1)	1.7 (35.1)	−0.7 (30.7)	−9.5 (14.9)	−12.2 (10.0)	−16.3 (2.7)	−18.1 (−0.6)
Average precipitation mm (inches)	138.1 (5.44)	93.8 (3.69)	97.6 (3.84)	147.7 (5.81)	121.8 (4.80)	81.9 (3.22)	56.3 (2.22)	59.3 (2.33)	127.5 (5.02)	189.0 (7.44)	220.2 (8.67)	141.7 (5.58)	1,474.9 (58.07)
Average precipitation days (≥ 1.0 mm)	11.5	9.1	9.6	10.9	10.5	7.5	6.2	6.8	7.7	11.8	12.6	11.7	116.1
Source: Météo-France

== Population ==
Historical population
Year	Pop.	±% p.a.
218	1,975	—
204	1,982	+0.03%
201	1,990	+0.13%
198	1,999	+0.15%
188	2,007	+0.04%
265	2,012	+0.00%
265	2,017	+inf%
245	2,023	+0.01%
207		—
Source: INSEE

== Sights ==
- Arboretum de Saint-Sauveur-des-Pourcils
- Bramabiau Abyss, a large karstic cave open to the public

== See also ==
- Communes of the Gard department
