= Mont Aigoual =

Mountain in France

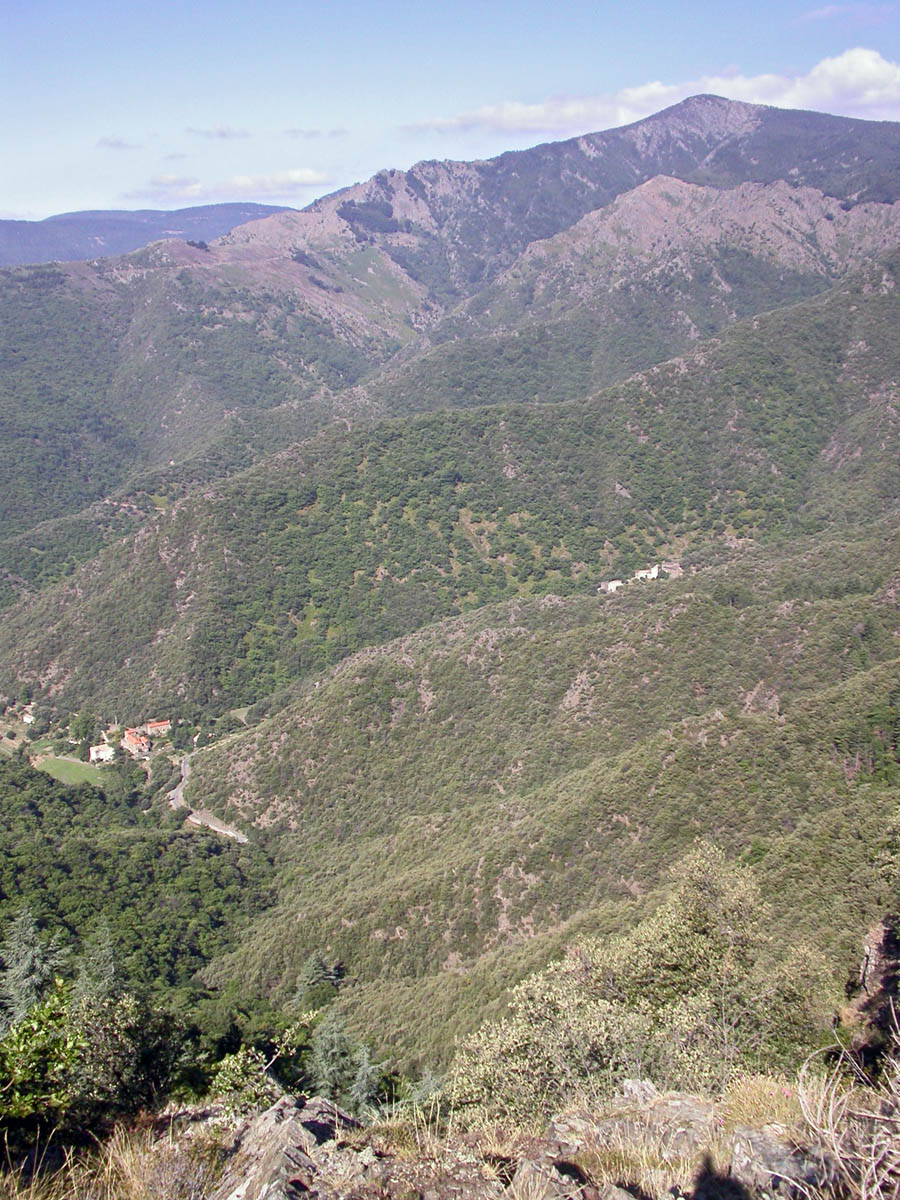
- East face of Mont Aigoual

Highest point
- Elevation: 1,567 m (5,141 ft)
- Prominence: 730 m (2,400 ft)
- Coordinates: 44°07′22″N 3°34′30″E

Geography
- Location: France
- Parent range: Massif Central

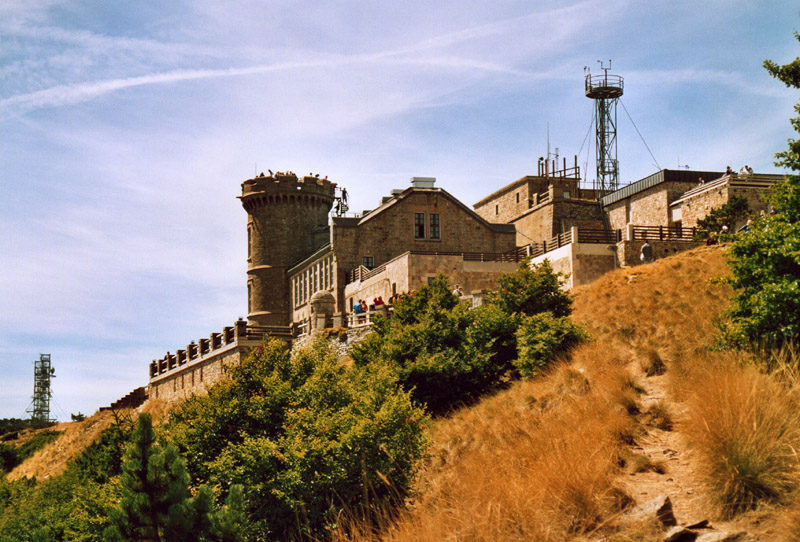
The weather observatory

Mont Aigoual (French pronunciation: [mɔ̃ ɛɡwal]; Occitan: Mont Augal, elevation 1567m / 5141 ft) is the highest point of the Gard département, France. It is part of the Massif Central, and it is located within the Cévennes National Park. Its southern slopes are the source of the river Hérault flowing into the Mediterranean.

When the sky is clear, it is possible to see the Mediterranean Sea, the Pyrenees, and also the Alps and Mont Blanc in particular. The summit is accessible by car from a variety of converging surfaced approaches.

== Geography and climate ==
This granite and schist outcrop is a major water catchment area in the Massif Central, being located where clouds from the cold Atlantic converge with warm Mediterranean air currents. The heavy rainfall has given the mountain its name: originally "Aiqualis" ('the watery one'). In an average year rainfall can measure up to 2,250 mm (89 in), making it the wettest place in France. Mont Aigoual forms part of the watershed between the Mediterranean and Atlantic.

The meteorological observatory, built in 1887 by the French Rivers Authority and Forestry Commission under the direction of Georges Fabre, is currently occupied by the French meteorological service (Météo France). It is the last remaining weather station in France which is still inhabited by meteorologists. An exhibition on weather forecasting is open to visitors in the summer months.

Severe weather conditions are sometimes recorded:

- Maximum Temperature : 30.4 °C on August 23, 2023;
- Minimum Temperature : -28 °C in 1956;
- Maximum wind speed : 360 km/h on November 1, 1968;
- Maximum rain in 24 hours: 607 mm from 6 p.m. on 30th to 6 p.m. on October 31, 1963;
- Maximum snow during one year : 10.24 metres;
- Frozen days: 144;
- High temperature days (> 25 °C) : 0;
- Rain days: 170;
- High wind days (> 16 m/s) : 265;
- Fog days: 241;
- Days with snow: 116.

Mont Aigoual features a cool-summer variant of an oceanic climate (Cfc), bordering to a subpolar (Dfc) (highland) climate.

Comparison of local Meteorological data with other cities in France
Town	Sunshine (hours/yr)	Rain (mm/yr)	Snow (days/yr)	Storm (days/yr)	Fog (days/yr)
National average	1,973	770	14	22	40
Mont Aigoual	N/A	1,931.7	62.3	22.7	241.0
Paris	1,661	637	12	18	10
Nice	2,724	767	1	29	1
Strasbourg	1,693	665	29	29	56
Brest	1,605	1,211	7	12	75

Climate data for Mont Aigoual, France (altitude 1567m, 1991–2020 normals, extremes 1896–present)
Month	Jan	Feb	Mar	Apr	May	Jun	Jul	Aug	Sep	Oct	Nov	Dec	Year
Record high °C (°F)	15.6 (60.1)	15.0 (59.0)	16.5 (61.7)	20.5 (68.9)	25.0 (77.0)	29.9 (85.8)	28.2 (82.8)	30.4 (86.7)	27.2 (81.0)	21.3 (70.3)	18.6 (65.5)	16.7 (62.1)	30.4 (86.7)
Mean daily maximum °C (°F)	1.2 (34.2)	1.0 (33.8)	3.6 (38.5)	6.2 (43.2)	10.3 (50.5)	14.7 (58.5)	17.6 (63.7)	17.6 (63.7)	13.0 (55.4)	9.0 (48.2)	4.4 (39.9)	2.4 (36.3)	8.4 (47.1)
Daily mean °C (°F)	−1.0 (30.2)	−1.4 (29.5)	1.1 (34.0)	3.4 (38.1)	7.4 (45.3)	11.5 (52.7)	14.1 (57.4)	14.3 (57.7)	10.2 (50.4)	6.7 (44.1)	2.2 (36.0)	0.1 (32.2)	5.7 (42.3)
Mean daily minimum °C (°F)	−3.2 (26.2)	−3.8 (25.2)	−1.5 (29.3)	0.7 (33.3)	4.4 (39.9)	8.3 (46.9)	10.6 (51.1)	10.9 (51.6)	7.4 (45.3)	4.3 (39.7)	0.0 (32.0)	−2.3 (27.9)	3.0 (37.4)
Record low °C (°F)	−23.1 (−9.6)	−28.0 (−18.4)	−19.7 (−3.5)	−14.0 (6.8)	−8.6 (16.5)	−3.3 (26.1)	−0.8 (30.6)	−0.2 (31.6)	−6.0 (21.2)	−9.8 (14.4)	−15.0 (5.0)	−20.6 (−5.1)	−28.0 (−18.4)
Average precipitation mm (inches)	176.4 (6.94)	141.1 (5.56)	136.9 (5.39)	169.3 (6.67)	157.5 (6.20)	89.1 (3.51)	57.0 (2.24)	60.4 (2.38)	184.0 (7.24)	309.7 (12.19)	297.4 (11.71)	191.2 (7.53)	1,970 (77.56)
Average precipitation days (≥ 1.0 mm)	12.2	10.2	10.3	11.2	10.8	7.4	6.2	7.2	8.4	13.5	13.9	12.9	124.3
Average snowy days	12.2	11.6	11.4	9.1	3.9	0.5	0.0	0.0	0.4	2.6	6.8	10.2	68.7
Average relative humidity (%)	82	85	83	84	84	82	76	78	80	84	83	81	81.8
Source 1: Météo France
Source 2: Infoclimat.fr (humidity and snowy days, 1961–1990)

== Tour de France ==
Mont Aigoual (1507 metres) was first used by the Tour de France in 1987 on Stage 17 from Millau to Avignon, when Italian rider Silvano Contini (Italy) of Del Tongo was first over the summit.

The climb featured in the 2020 Tour de France on Stage 6 as a summit finish from Le Teil. The winner was the Kazakh cyclist Alexey Lutsenko of Astana Pro Team.

== The Rider by Tim Krabbé ==
The Tour of Mont Aigoual is the semi-fictional cycle race in the book The Rider by Tim Krabbé.

The race is recreated on the Rapha and on the inrng weblogs
