= Les Mages =

- Commune
- Coat of arms
- Location of Les Mages
- Location within France Location within Occitanie
- Coordinates: 44°13′45″N 4°10′00″E
- Country: France
- Region: Occitania
- Department: Gard
- Arrondissement: Alès
- Canton: Rousson
- Intercommunality: Alès Agglomération

Government
  - Mayor (2020–2026): Alain Giovinazzo
- Area^{1}: 12.69 km^{2} (4.90 sq mi)
- Elevation: 186 m (610 ft)
- Highest elevation: 485 m (1,591 ft)
- Lowest elevation: 138 m (453 ft)
- Population (2023): 2,106
  - Density: 166.0/km^{2} (429.8/sq mi)
- Time zone: UTC+01:00 (CET)
  - Summer (DST): UTC+02:00 (CEST)
- INSEE/Postal code: 30152 /30960
- ^{1} French Land Register data, which excludes lakes, ponds, glaciers > 1 km^{2} (0.386 sq mi or 247 acres) and river estuaries.

Les Mages (French pronunciation: [le maʒ]; Occitan: Los Mages) is a commune in the Gard department in the Occitanie region in southern France.

== Geography ==
The village of Les Mages lies between Alès and Saint-Ambroix on the CD 904 road, in the Cévennes coal basin, just below the National Forest of Rouvergue in the Cévennes National Park.

It lies on the river Auzonnet, a tributary of the Cèze. As such the town is a member of AB Cèze, the Syndicat Mixte d'Aménagement du Bassin Versant de la Ceze, responsible for the prevention and fight against floods as well as preserving the natural environment.

== History ==
The village was elevated from hamlet to commune (by separation from the nearby Saint-Jean-de-Valériscle village) by a royal ordinance of September 25, 1834, following the increase in population driven by the development of coal mining in the Cevennes basin. The town, Les Mages belongs to the Community of Communes called "Vivre en Cévennes", Living in the Cevennes.

== Sights ==
Several mills whose buildings still bear witness to the sericulture past activity (silkworm farming).

- Bleton spinning mill, closed in 1957, rue de l'Eglise.
- Lacroix spinning mill, closed in 1855, Bois Redon, Route de Saint Julien de Cassagne.
- Duclaux spinning mill, closed in 1889, Melhien Castle.
- Mazolier spinning mill, closed in 1884 Castle Melhien Road.
- Labeille / Villaret spinning mill, closed in 1885, despite some attempts to restart until 1922, Larnac hamlet.
- Silhol spinning mill, closed in 1855, Claux, Melhien hamlet.
- Martin spinning mill later oil mill Benoit then Rodier, route de Saint Ambroix.
- Ayrolette spinning mill, initially the Gentil paper mill, established in 1660, in the Ayrolette hamlet, route de Saint Ambroix.
- Blachère spinning mill, formerly oil mill and later Védrines spinning mill.

The glass factory Barrière was founded in 1804 to manufacture green glass. After many difficulties, the factory closed its doors in 1850.

On a hill, the "Tourette" dominates the village. It is a simple capitelle limestone and mortar construction, but became the symbol of the village and a replica was built on the roundabout at the entrance of the commune.

The former railway station, on the spur of the small SNCF line from Alès to Bessèges, has been transformed into housing. It witnessed the passing-by of coal trains from Martinet, Saint-Florent-sur-Auzonnet and Saint-Jean-de-Valériscle, joining the main line to Saint Julien de Cassagne. This line was also used to transport the coils of raw silk to Lyon to be woven.

== Population ==
Historical population

Year	Pop.	±% p.a.
1836	1,040	—
1841	1,121	+1.51%
1846	1,114	−0.13%
1851	1,247	+2.28%
1856	1,240	−0.11%
1861	1,203	−0.60%
1866	1,255	+0.85%
1872	1,140	−1.59%
1876	1,155	+0.33%
1881	1,009	−2.67%
1886	1,089	+1.54%
1891	1,105	+0.29%
1896	1,135	+0.54%
1901	1,101	−0.61%
1906	1,097	−0.07%
1911	1,139	+0.75%

Year	Pop.	±% p.a.
1921	1,076	−0.57%
1926	1,144	+1.23%
1931	1,147	+0.05%
1936	1,028	−2.17%
1946	1,051	+0.22%
1954	1,125	+0.85%
1962	1,150	+0.28%
1968	1,145	−0.07%
1975	1,127	−0.23%
1982	1,275	+1.78%
1990	1,497	+2.03%
1999	1,511	+0.10%
2007	1,770	+2.00%
2012	1,931	+1.76%
2017	2,074	+1.44%
2023	2,106	+0.26%

Source: EHESS and INSEE (1968-2023)

== Personalities ==
The painter Georges Bauquier, assistant of Fernand Léger, creator of Fernand Léger Museum in Biot, comes from a Les Mages family. In the 1970s he organised in the local village school several exhibitions of high quality. At his request, Nadia Léger, the widow of Fernand Léger, has bequeathed to the town the Woman with a Bird mosaïc, one of Fernand Léger mosaic that adorns the front of the Les Mages Culture Complex.

=== George Bauquier Complex ===
In 2006 the Georges Bauquier complex was created, including a theater and a video screening room. In 2008 the travel film festival has been launched and successfully renewed in 2009.

== See also ==
- Communes of the Gard department
