= Rochegude =

Rochegude is the name or part of the name of several communes in France:

- Rochegude, Drôme, in the Drôme department
- Rochegude, Gard, in the Gard department
- Rochegude, part of the commune of Charbonnières-les-Vieilles, in the Puy-de-Dôme department
