= Bessèges =

Commune in Occitanie, France

- Commune
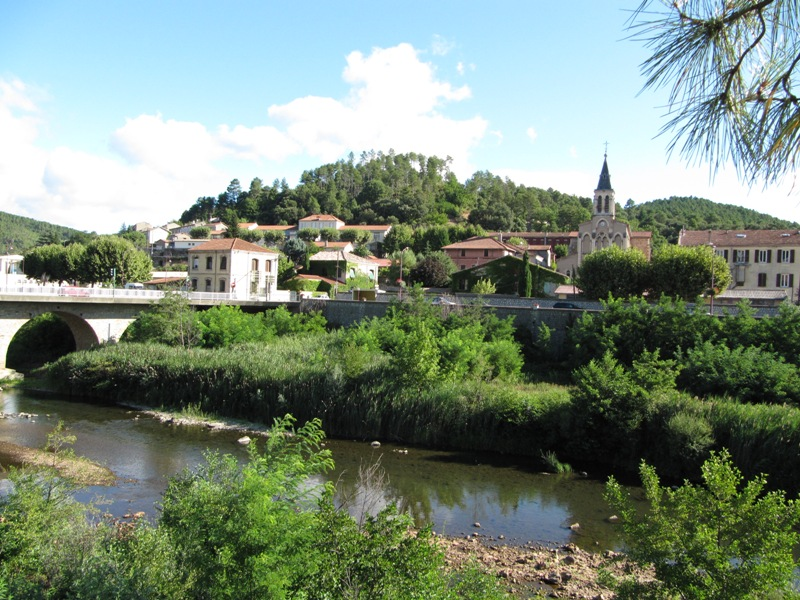

- Coat of arms
- Location of Bessèges
- Location within France Location within Occitanie
- Coordinates: 44°17′33″N 4°06′05″E
- Country: France
- Region: Occitania
- Department: Gard
- Arrondissement: Alès
- Canton: Rousson

Government
  - Mayor (2020–2026): Bernard Portales
- Area^{1}: 10.32 km^{2} (3.98 sq mi)
- Elevation: 170 m (560 ft)
- Highest elevation: 492 m (1,614 ft)
- Lowest elevation: 146 m (479 ft)
- Population (2023): 2,606
  - Density: 252.5/km^{2} (654.0/sq mi)
- Time zone: UTC+01:00 (CET)
  - Summer (DST): UTC+02:00 (CEST)
- INSEE/Postal code: 30037 /30160
- ^{1} French Land Register data, which excludes lakes, ponds, glaciers > 1 km^{2} (0.386 sq mi or 247 acres) and river estuaries.

Bessèges (French pronunciation: [besɛʒ]; Occitan: Besseja) is a commune in the Gard department in France. It is situated on the river Cèze.

== History ==
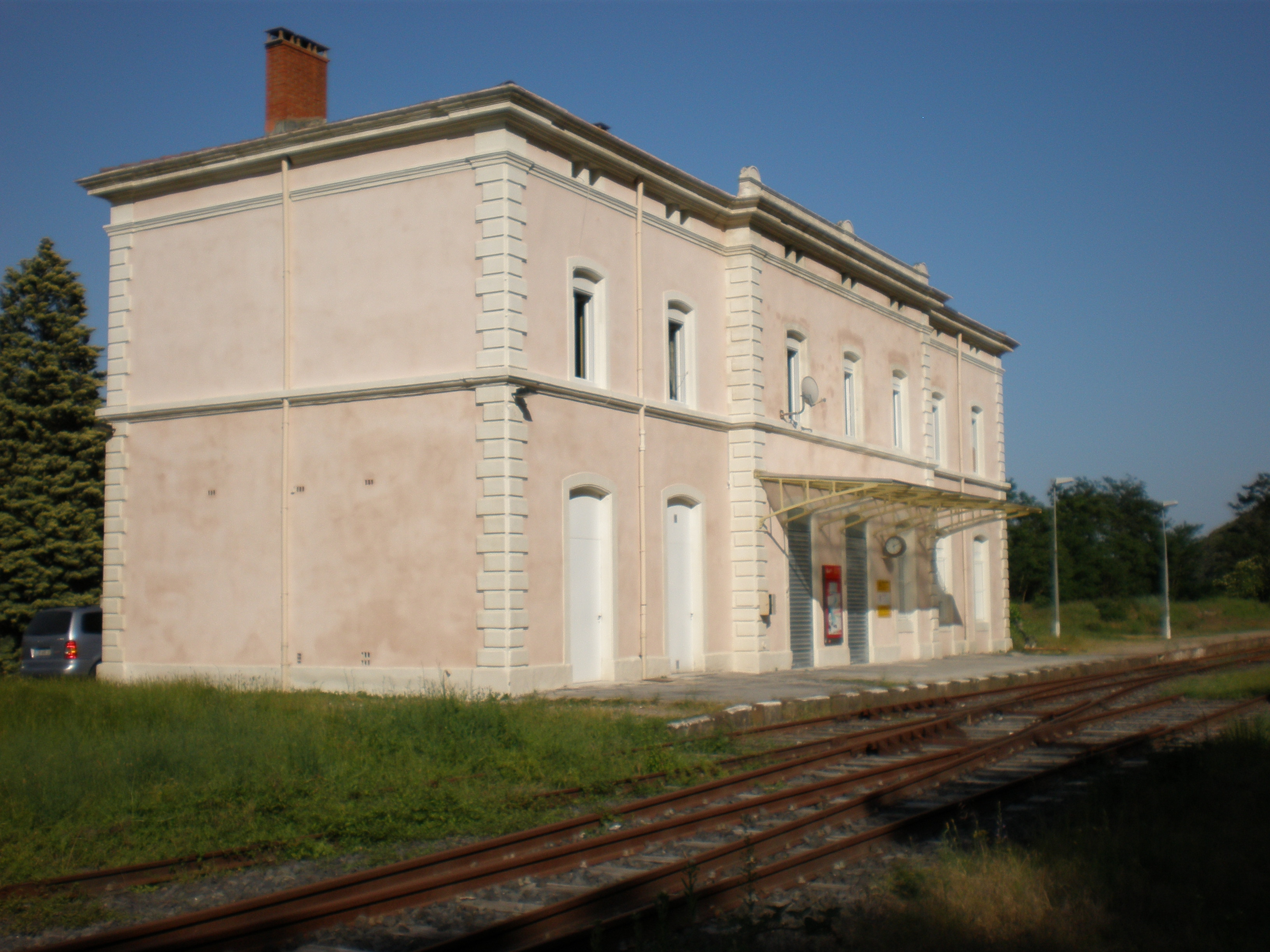
The former railway station

Historically Bessèges was a hamlet of Robiac. Its importance began with the opening of a coal mine in 1809, followed by an iron and steel plant in 1833, and eventually the railway reached it in 1857. The commune was created in 1857 from parts of Gagnières and Robiac-Rochessadoule.

At its peak in the late 19th century, the population was over 11,000. However, during the 20th century it declined and eventually the mine was abandoned in 1964, and the steel-works in 1987. Today its economy is based on tourism, and it is home to the Étoile de Bessèges road bicycle race.

== Population ==
Historical population

Year	Pop.	±% p.a.
1861	7,055	—
1866	8,671	+4.21%
1872	8,908	+0.45%
1876	10,668	+4.61%
1881	11,404	+1.34%
1886	10,653	−1.35%
1891	8,673	−4.03%
1896	7,962	−1.70%
1901	9,040	+2.57%
1906	8,219	−1.89%
1911	8,030	−0.46%
1921	6,368	−2.29%
1926	7,062	+2.09%
1931	6,357	−2.08%

Year	Pop.	±% p.a.
1936	5,425	−3.12%
1946	5,648	+0.40%
1954	5,823	+0.38%
1962	5,720	−0.22%
1968	5,421	−0.89%
1975	5,255	−0.44%
1982	4,352	−2.66%
1990	3,635	−2.23%
1999	3,137	−1.62%
2007	3,196	+0.23%
2012	3,051	−0.92%
2017	2,844	−1.40%
2023	2,606	−1.45%

Source: EHESS and INSEE (1968-2023)

== See also ==
- Communes of the Gard department
