= Molières-sur-Cèze =

- Commune
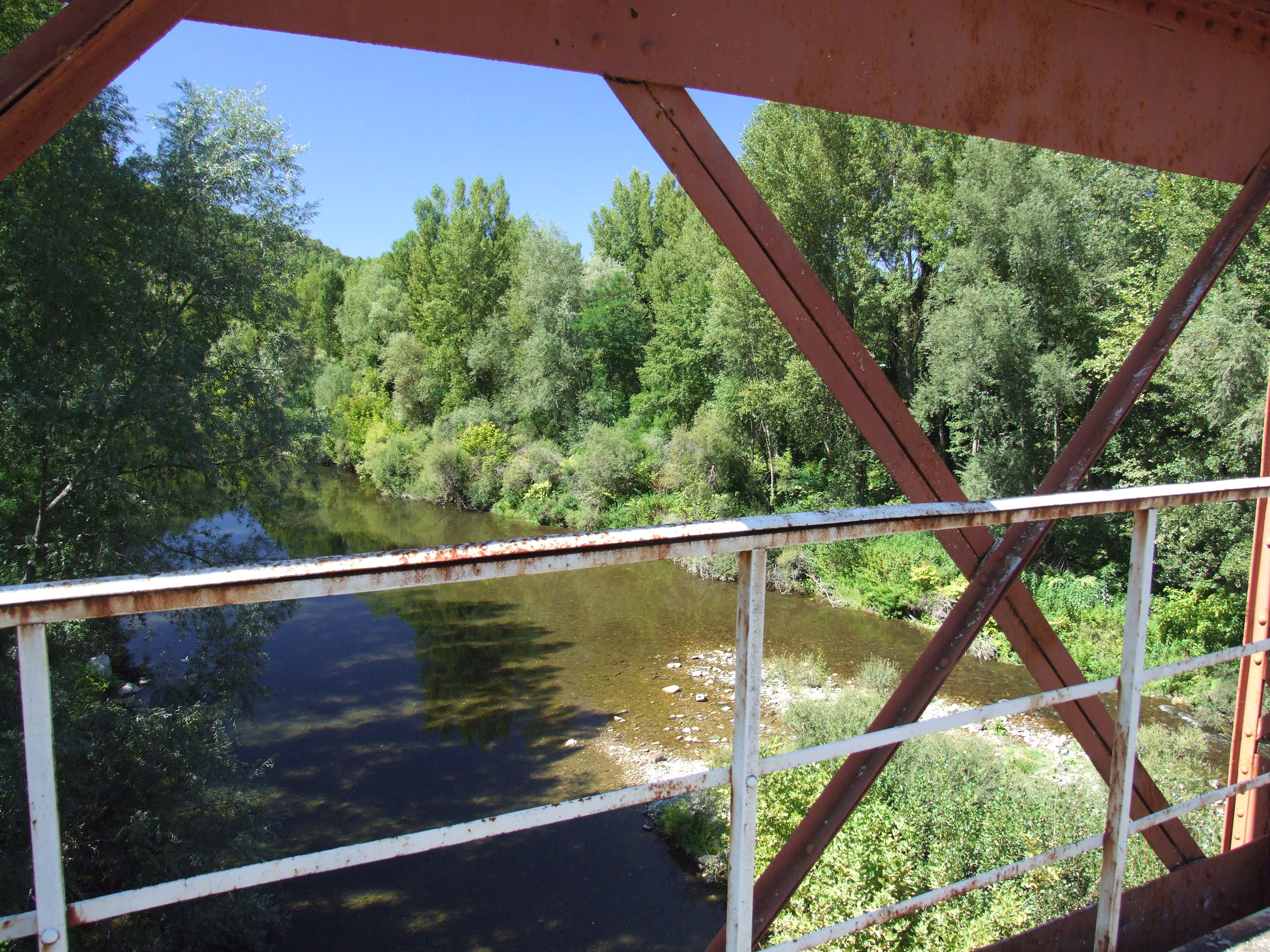
- A bridge in Molières-sur-Cèze overlooking the Cèze river

- Coat of arms
- Location of Molières-sur-Cèze
- Location within France Location within Occitanie
- Coordinates: 44°15′40″N 4°09′38″E
- Country: France
- Region: Occitania
- Department: Gard
- Arrondissement: Alès
- Canton: Rousson

Government
  - Mayor (2020–2026): Florence Bouis
- Area^{1}: 8.71 km^{2} (3.36 sq mi)
- Elevation: 196 m (643 ft)
- Highest elevation: 485 m (1,591 ft)
- Lowest elevation: 134 m (440 ft)
- Population (2023): 1,176
  - Density: 135/km^{2} (350/sq mi)
- Time zone: UTC+01:00 (CET)
  - Summer (DST): UTC+02:00 (CEST)
- INSEE/Postal code: 30171 /30410
- ^{1} French Land Register data, which excludes lakes, ponds, glaciers > 1 km^{2} (0.386 sq mi or 247 acres) and river estuaries.

Molières-sur-Cèze (French pronunciation: [mɔljɛʁ syʁ sɛz]; Occitan: Molièras de Céser) is a commune in the Gard department in southern France.

== Population ==
Historical population
Year	Pop.	±% p.a.
1968	2,700	—
1975	2,225	−2.73%
1982	2,142	−0.54%
1990	2,151	+0.05%
1999	1,432	−4.42%
2007	1,569	+1.15%
2012	1,507	−0.80%
2017	1,297	−2.96%
2023	1,176	−1.62%
Source: INSEE

== See also ==
- Communes of the Gard department
