= Allègre-les-Fumades =

Commune in Occitanie, France

Allègre-les-Fumades Alègre (Occitan)
- Commune
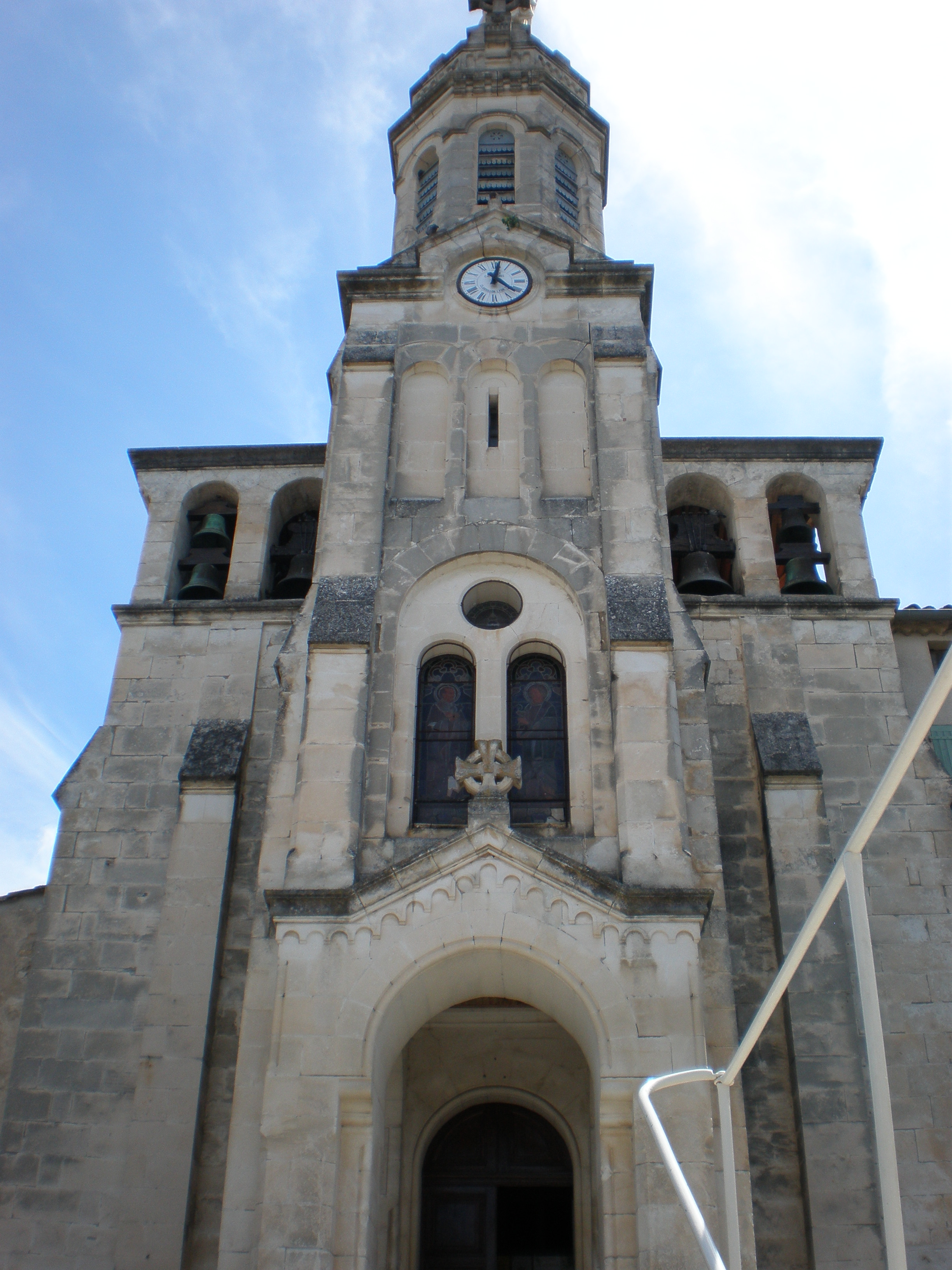
- The church in Allègre-les-Fumades

- Coat of arms
- Location of Allègre-les-Fumades
- Location within France Location within Occitanie
- Coordinates: 44°12′01″N 4°14′47″E
- Country: France
- Region: Occitania
- Department: Gard
- Arrondissement: Alès
- Canton: Rousson
- Intercommunality: Cèze Cévennes

Government
  - Mayor (2020–2026): Geneviève Coste
- Area^{1}: 24.59 km^{2} (9.49 sq mi)
- Elevation: 135 m (443 ft)
- Highest elevation: 381 m (1,250 ft)
- Lowest elevation: 115 m (377 ft)
- Population (2023): 1,002
  - Density: 40.75/km^{2} (105.5/sq mi)
- Time zone: UTC+01:00 (CET)
  - Summer (DST): UTC+02:00 (CEST)
- INSEE/Postal code: 30008 /30500
- Website: allegre-les-fumades.fr
- ^{1} French Land Register data, which excludes lakes, ponds, glaciers > 1 km^{2} (0.386 sq mi or 247 acres) and river estuaries.

Allègre-les-Fumades (French pronunciation: [alɛɡʁ le fymad]; Occitan: Alègre, before 1998: Allègre) is a commune in the Gard department in the Occitania region in Southern France. It is located northeast of Alès.

== Population ==
Historical population
| Year | Pop. | ±% p.a. |
|---|---|---|
| 1968 | 563 | — |
| 1975 | 577 | +0.35% |
| 1982 | 581 | +0.10% |
| 1990 | 623 | +0.88% |
| 1999 | 616 | −0.13% |
| 2007 | 734 | +2.21% |
| 2012 | 816 | +2.14% |
| 2017 | 902 | +2.02% |
| 2023 | 1,002 | +1.77% |
Source: INSEE

== Sights and monuments ==
- Château d'Allègre: ruined castle, protected since 1997 as a monument historique.

== Notable people linked to the commune ==
- Daniel Féret (born 1944), politician (founder of Front national in Belgium) and doctor, works at the thermal springs centre in Fumades.

== See also ==
- Communes of the Gard department
