= Saint-Julien-de-Cassagnas =

- Commune
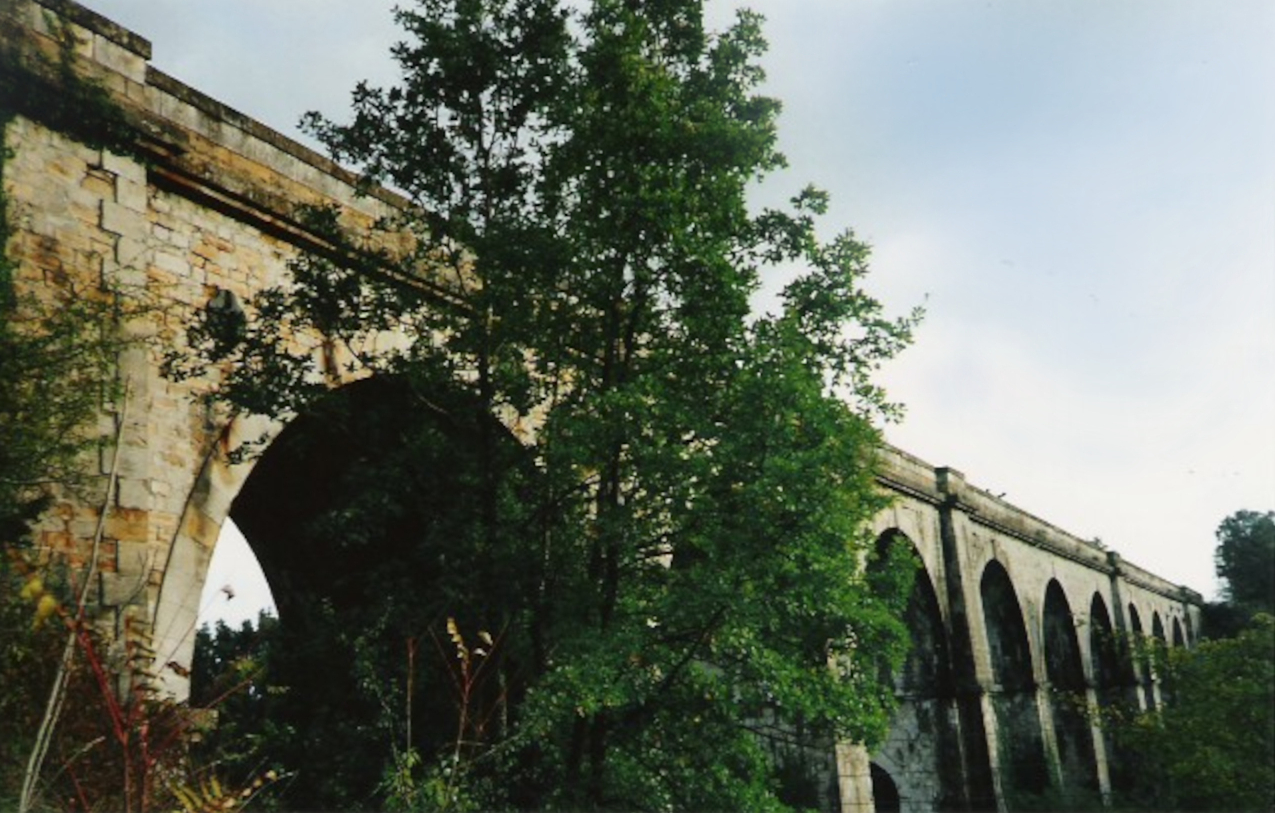
- The viaduct of Saint-Julien-de-Cassagnas

- Coat of arms
- Location of Saint-Julien-de-Cassagnas
- Location within France Location within Occitanie
- Coordinates: 44°12′46″N 4°11′56″E
- Country: France
- Region: Occitania
- Department: Gard
- Arrondissement: Alès
- Canton: Rousson
- Intercommunality: Alès Agglomération

Government
  - Mayor (2020–2026): Pascal Milesi
- Area^{1}: 4.46 km^{2} (1.72 sq mi)
- Elevation: 169 m (554 ft)
- Highest elevation: 208 m (682 ft)
- Lowest elevation: 135 m (443 ft)
- Population (2023): 734
  - Density: 165/km^{2} (426/sq mi)
- Time zone: UTC+01:00 (CET)
  - Summer (DST): UTC+02:00 (CEST)
- INSEE/Postal code: 30271 /30500
- ^{1} French Land Register data, which excludes lakes, ponds, glaciers > 1 km^{2} (0.386 sq mi or 247 acres) and river estuaries.

Saint-Julien-de-Cassagnas (Occitan: Sent Julian de Cassanhaç) is a commune in the Gard department in southern France.

== Population ==
Historical population
| Year | Pop. | ±% p.a. |
|---|---|---|
| 1968 | 365 | — |
| 1975 | 373 | +0.31% |
| 1982 | 374 | +0.04% |
| 1990 | 503 | +3.77% |
| 1999 | 518 | +0.33% |
| 2007 | 605 | +1.96% |
| 2012 | 641 | +1.16% |
| 2017 | 698 | +1.72% |
| 2023 | 734 | +0.84% |
Source: INSEE

== See also ==
- Communes of the Gard department
