= Saint-Julien-les-Rosiers =

- Commune
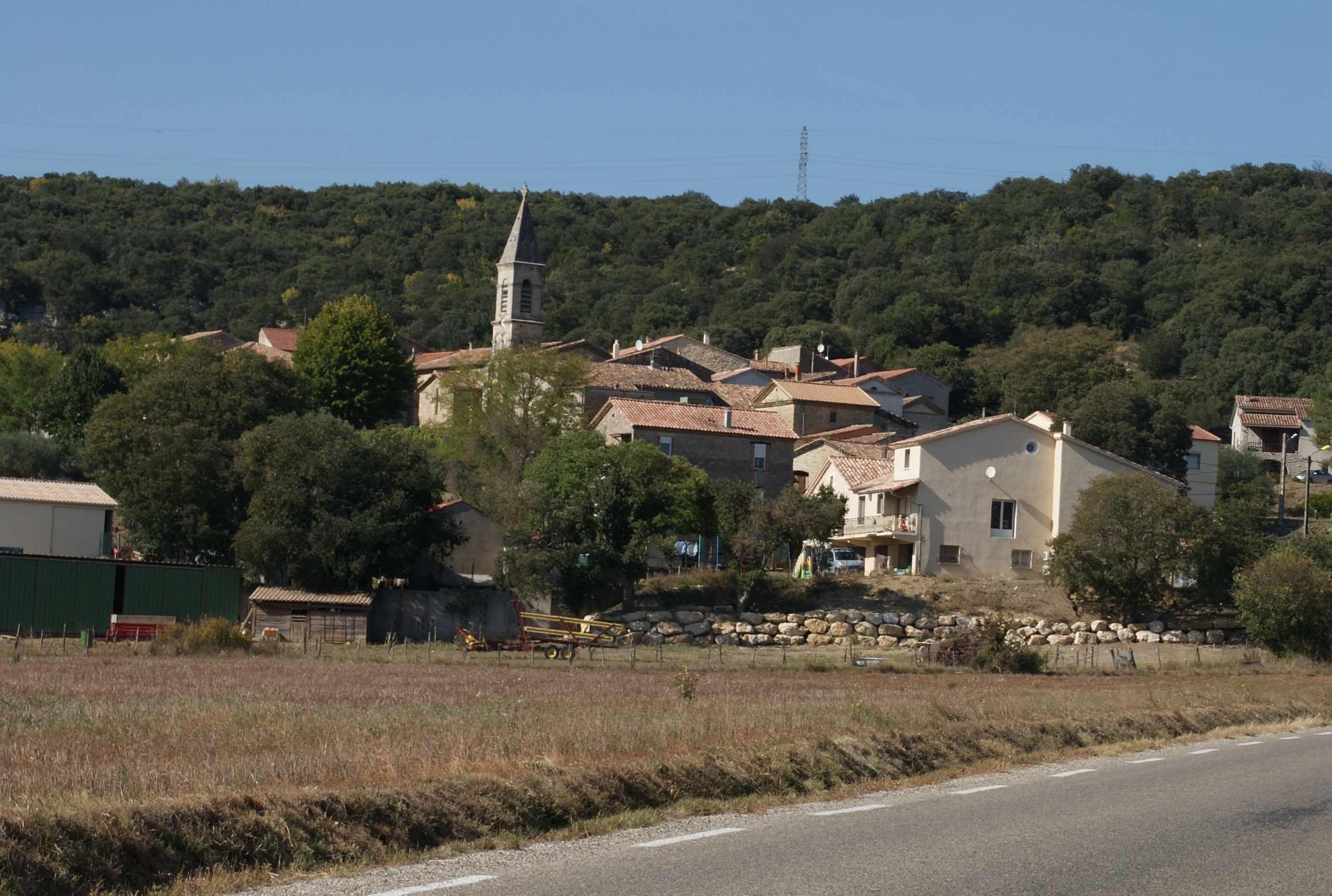
- A general view of Saint-Julien-les-Rosiers

- Coat of arms
- Location of Saint-Julien-les-Rosiers
- Location within France Location within Occitanie
- Coordinates: 44°10′30″N 4°06′36″E
- Country: France
- Region: Occitania
- Department: Gard
- Arrondissement: Alès
- Canton: Rousson
- Intercommunality: Alès Agglomération

Government
  - Mayor (2020–2026): Serge Bord
- Area^{1}: 14.01 km^{2} (5.41 sq mi)
- Elevation: 210 m (690 ft)
- Highest elevation: 545 m (1,788 ft)
- Lowest elevation: 158 m (518 ft)
- Population (2023): 3,533
  - Density: 252.2/km^{2} (653.1/sq mi)
- Time zone: UTC+01:00 (CET)
  - Summer (DST): UTC+02:00 (CEST)
- INSEE/Postal code: 30274 /30340
- ^{1} French Land Register data, which excludes lakes, ponds, glaciers > 1 km^{2} (0.386 sq mi or 247 acres) and river estuaries.

Saint-Julien-les-Rosiers (French pronunciation: [sɛ̃ ʒyljɛ̃ le ʁozje]; Occitan: Sent Julian dels Rosiers) is a commune in the Gard department in southern France.

== Population ==
Historical population

Year	Pop.	±% p.a.
1793	282	—
1821	560	+2.48%
1846	827	+1.57%
1872	951	+0.54%
1901	984	+0.12%
1926	1,042	+0.23%
1946	924	−0.60%
1962	1,182	+1.55%
1968	1,305	+1.66%

Year	Pop.	±% p.a.
1975	1,534	+2.34%
1982	2,021	+4.02%
1990	2,325	+1.77%
1999	2,444	+0.56%
2007	2,821	+1.81%
2012	3,207	+2.60%
2017	3,348	+0.86%
2023	3,533	+0.90%

Source: EHESS and INSEE (1968-2023)

== See also ==
- Communes of the Gard department
