= Saint-Jean-de-Maruéjols-et-Avéjan =

Saint-Jean-de-Maruéjols-et-Avéjan Sant Joan dels Anèls
- Commune
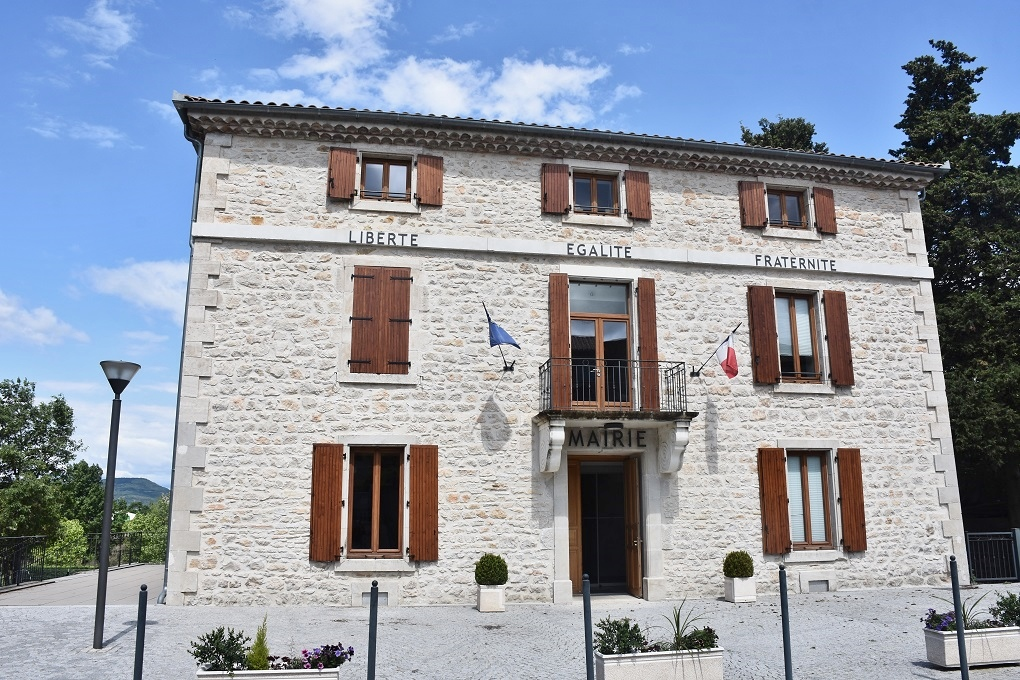
- Town hall

- Coat of arms
- Location of Saint-Jean-de-Maruéjols-et-Avéjan
- Location within France Location within Occitanie
- Coordinates: 44°15′29″N 4°17′39″E
- Country: France
- Region: Occitania
- Department: Gard
- Arrondissement: Alès
- Canton: Rousson

Government
  - Mayor (2020–2026): Thierry Daublon
- Area^{1}: 17.3 km^{2} (6.7 sq mi)
- Elevation: 125 m (410 ft)
- Highest elevation: 240 m (790 ft)
- Lowest elevation: 91 m (299 ft)
- Population (2023): 889
  - Density: 51.4/km^{2} (133/sq mi)
- Time zone: UTC+01:00 (CET)
  - Summer (DST): UTC+02:00 (CEST)
- INSEE/Postal code: 30266 /30430
- ^{1} French Land Register data, which excludes lakes, ponds, glaciers > 1 km^{2} (0.386 sq mi or 247 acres) and river estuaries.

Saint-Jean-de-Maruéjols-et-Avéjan (French pronunciation: [sɛ̃ ʒɑ̃ də maʁɥeʒɔl e aveʒɑ̃]; Occitan: Sent Joan de Maruèjols e Avejan) is a commune in the Gard department in southern France.

== Population ==
Historical population
Year	Pop.	±% p.a.
1968	791	—
1975	774	−0.31%
1982	766	−0.15%
1990	766	+0.00%
1999	810	+0.62%
2007	868	+0.87%
2012	952	+1.86%
2017	920	−0.68%
2023	889	−0.57%
Source: INSEE

== See also ==
- Communes of the Gard department
