= Saint-Victor-de-Malcap =

- Commune
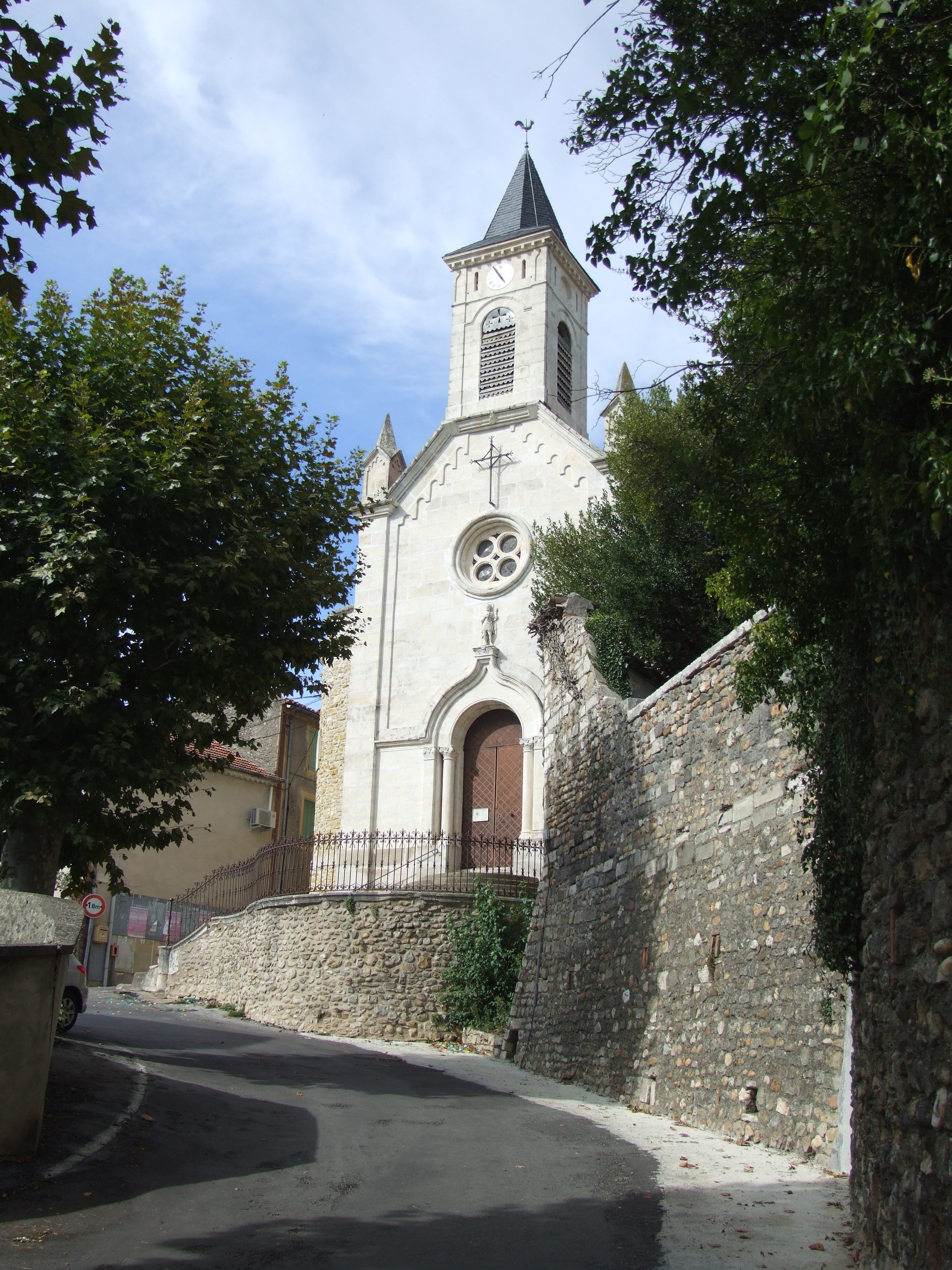
- The church in Saint-Victor-de-Malcap

- Coat of arms
- Location of Saint-Victor-de-Malcap
- Location within France Location within Occitanie
- Coordinates: 44°14′53″N 4°13′19″E
- Country: France
- Region: Occitania
- Department: Gard
- Arrondissement: Alès
- Canton: Rousson

Government
  - Mayor (2020–2026): Mireille Désira-Nadal
- Area^{1}: 10.87 km^{2} (4.20 sq mi)
- Highest elevation: 231 m (758 ft)
- Lowest elevation: 117 m (384 ft)
- Population (2023): 819
  - Density: 75.3/km^{2} (195/sq mi)
- Time zone: UTC+01:00 (CET)
  - Summer (DST): UTC+02:00 (CEST)
- INSEE/Postal code: 30303 /30500
- ^{1} French Land Register data, which excludes lakes, ponds, glaciers > 1 km^{2} (0.386 sq mi or 247 acres) and river estuaries.

Saint-Victor-de-Malcap (Occitan: Sent Victor de Maucap) is a commune in the Gard department in southern France.

== Population ==
Historical population
Year	Pop.	±% p.a.
1968	412	—
1975	412	+0.00%
1982	505	+2.95%
1990	506	+0.02%
1999	538	+0.68%
2007	642	+2.23%
2012	812	+4.81%
2017	833	+0.51%
2023	819	−0.28%
Source: INSEE

== See also ==
- Communes of the Gard department
