= Canton of Rousson =

Coordinates: 44.19°N 4.15°E

Rousson
- Canton
- Interactive map of Rousson
- Country: France
- Region: Occitania
- Department: Gard
- No. of communes: {{{nbcomm}}}

Government
  - Representatives (2021–2028): Cathy Chaulet; Ghislain Chassary
- Area: 385.53 km^{2} (148.85 sq mi)
- Population (2023): 32,004
  - Density: 83.013/km^{2} (215.00/sq mi)
- INSEE code: 30 18

The canton of Rousson is an administrative division of the Gard department, southern France. It was created at the French canton reorganisation which came into effect in March 2015. Its seat is in Rousson.

== Composition ==
It consists of the following communes:

1. Allègre-les-Fumades
2. Barjac
3. Bessèges
4. Bordezac
5. Courry
6. Gagnières
7. Les Mages
8. Le Martinet
9. Méjannes-le-Clap
10. Meyrannes
11. Molières-sur-Cèze
12. Navacelles
13. Peyremale
14. Potelières
15. Rivières
16. Robiac-Rochessadoule
17. Rochegude
18. Rousson
19. Saint-Ambroix
20. Saint-Brès
21. Saint-Denis
22. Saint-Florent-sur-Auzonnet
23. Saint-Jean-de-Maruéjols-et-Avéjan
24. Saint-Jean-de-Valériscle
25. Saint-Julien-de-Cassagnas
26. Saint-Julien-les-Rosiers
27. Saint-Privat-de-Champclos
28. Saint-Victor-de-Malcap
29. Tharaux

== Councillors ==
Election	Councillors	Party	Occupation
2015	Cathy Chaulet	PCF	Territorial official
2015	Jacky Valy	PCF	Pensioner

== Pictures of the canton ==
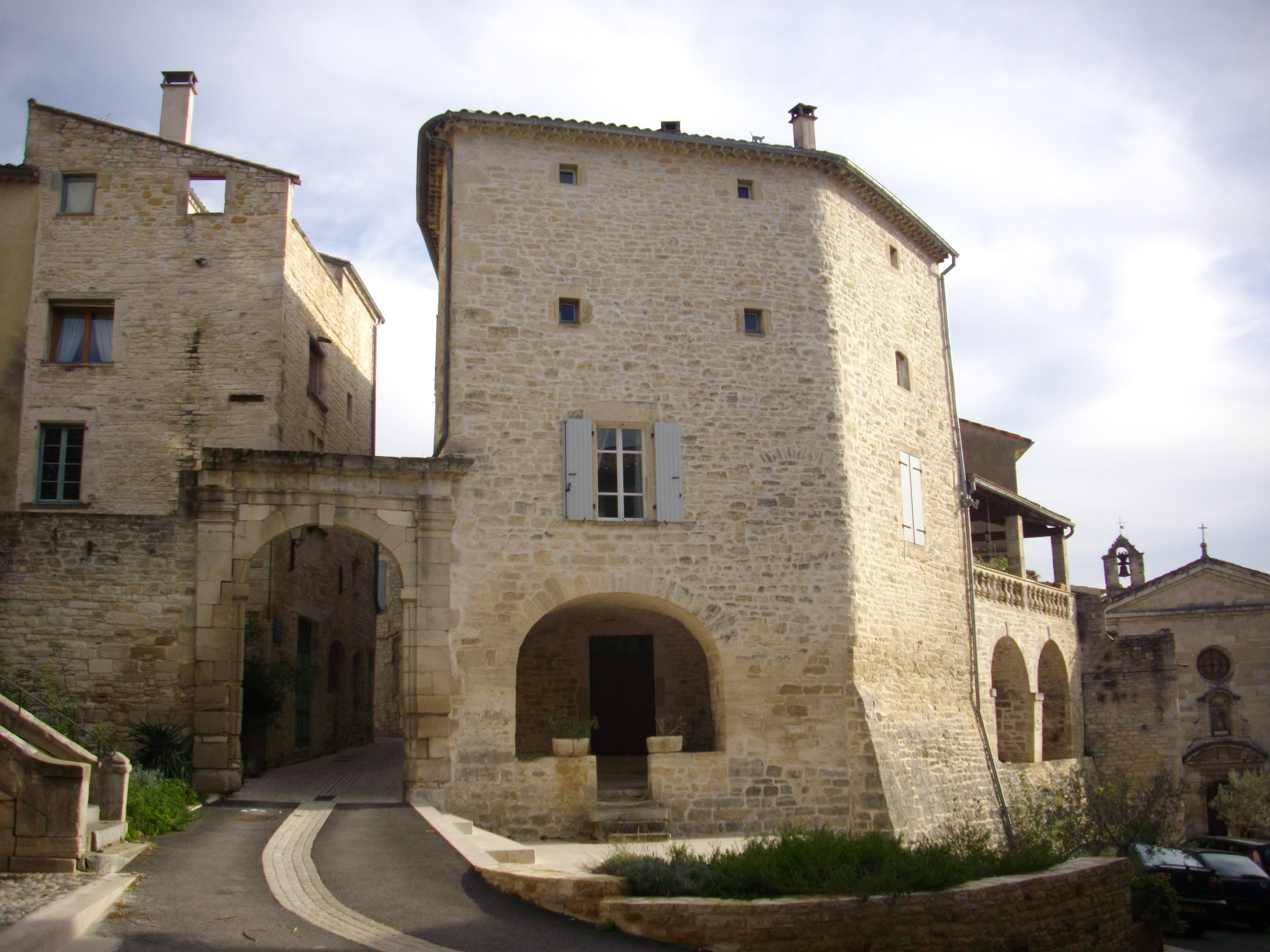
"Lower gate" of Barjac

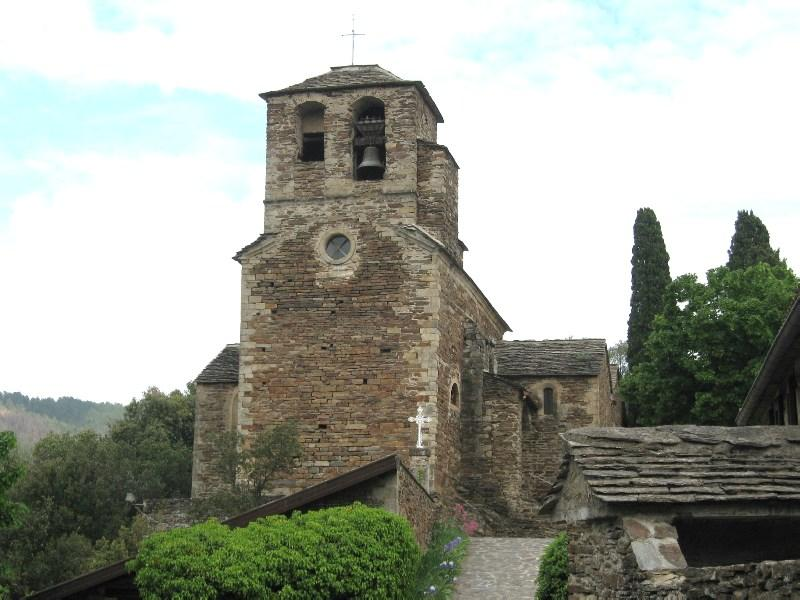
Church of Peyremale

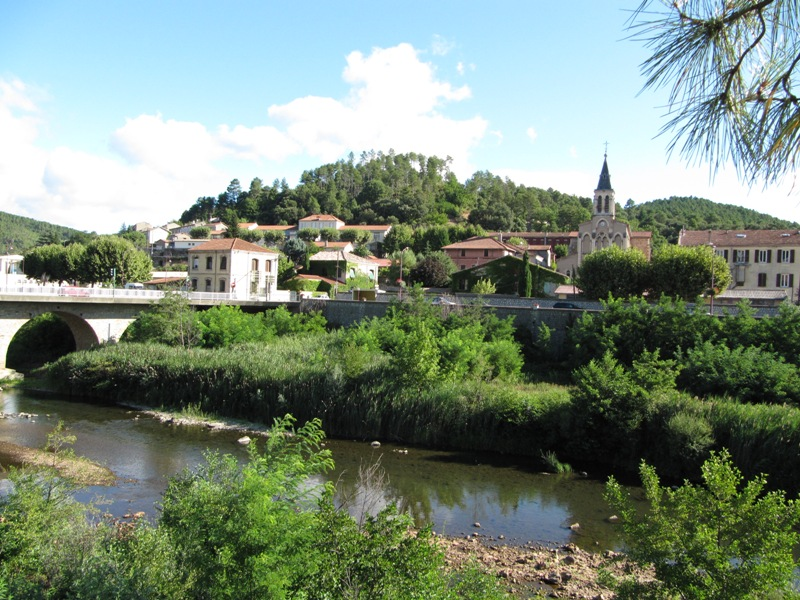
View of Bessèges
