= Navacelles =

- Commune
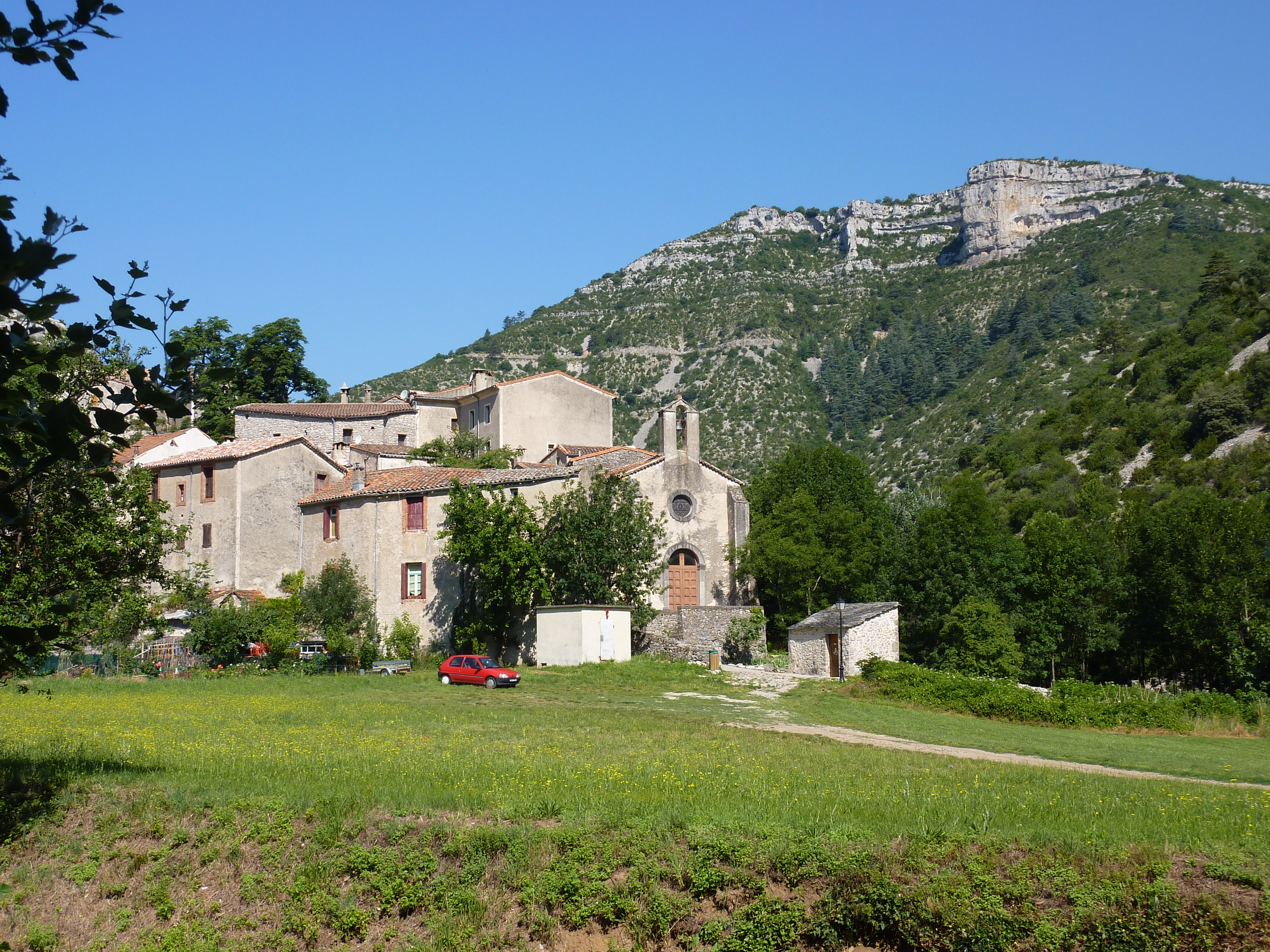
- A general view of Navacelles

- Coat of arms
- Location of Navacelles
- Location within France Location within Occitanie
- Coordinates: 44°09′50″N 4°14′29″E
- Country: France
- Region: Occitania
- Department: Gard
- Arrondissement: Alès
- Canton: Rousson
- Intercommunality: Cèze-Cévennes

Government
  - Mayor (2020–2026): Bruno Clemençon
- Area^{1}: 11.02 km^{2} (4.25 sq mi)
- Highest elevation: 337 m (1,106 ft)
- Lowest elevation: 129 m (423 ft)
- Population (2023): 317
  - Density: 28.8/km^{2} (74.5/sq mi)
- Time zone: UTC+01:00 (CET)
  - Summer (DST): UTC+02:00 (CEST)
- INSEE/Postal code: 30187 /30580
- ^{1} French Land Register data, which excludes lakes, ponds, glaciers > 1 km^{2} (0.386 sq mi or 247 acres) and river estuaries.

Navacelles (French pronunciation: [navasɛl]; Occitan: Navacèlas) is a commune in the Gard department in southern France.

== Population ==
Historical population
Year	Pop.	±% p.a.
1968	230	—
1975	220	−0.63%
1982	204	−1.07%
1990	190	−0.88%
1999	243	+2.77%
2007	266	+1.14%
2012	315	+3.44%
2017	325	+0.63%
2023	317	−0.41%
Source: INSEE

== See also ==
- Communes of the Gard department
