= Méjannes-le-Clap =

- Commune
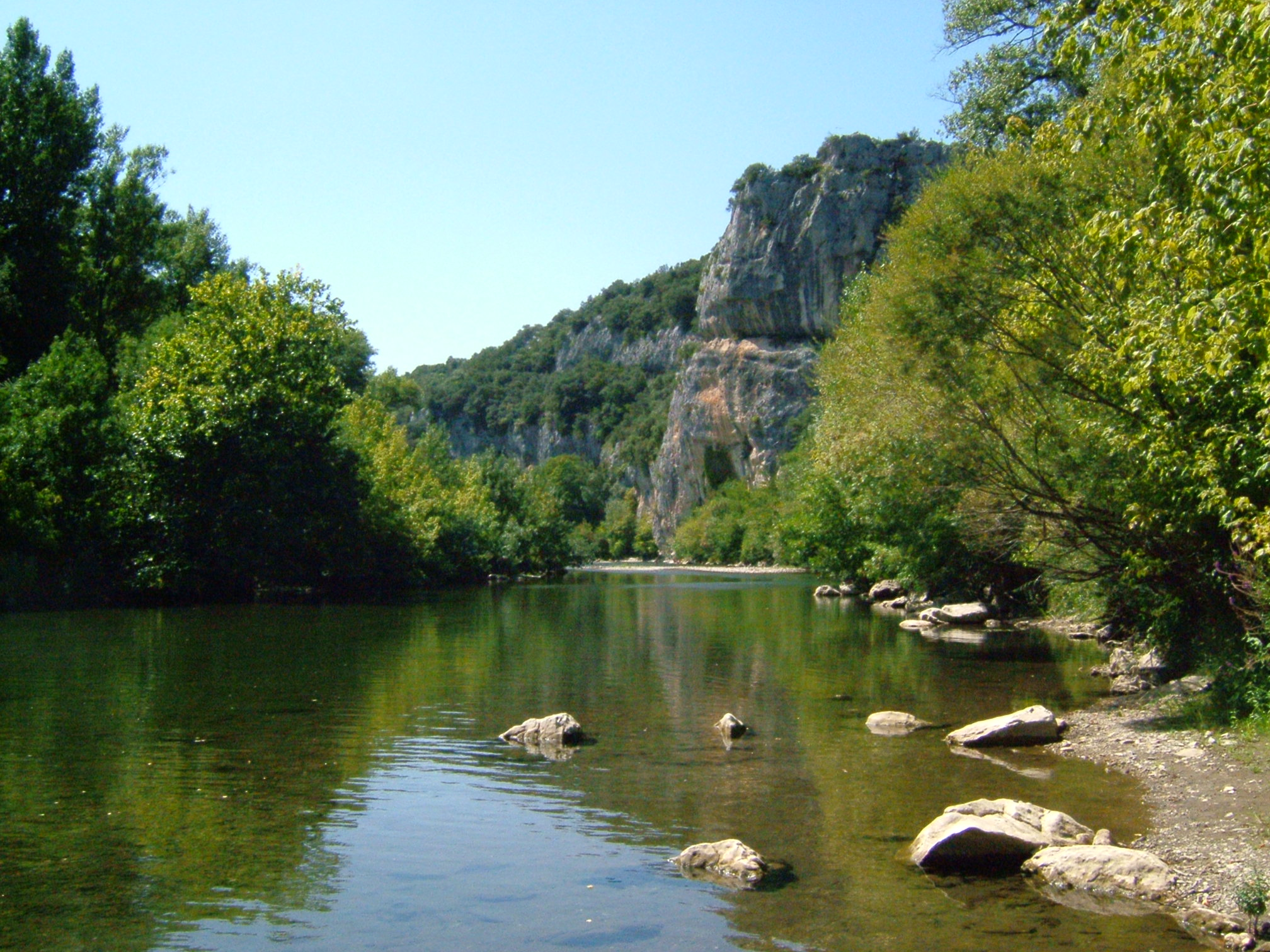
- The Cèze seen from Génèse

- Coat of arms
- Location of Méjannes-le-Clap
- Location within France Location within Occitanie
- Coordinates: 44°13′34″N 4°20′51″E
- Country: France
- Region: Occitania
- Department: Gard
- Arrondissement: Alès
- Canton: Rousson

Government
  - Mayor (2020–2026): Jérôme Bassier
- Area^{1}: 38.24 km^{2} (14.76 sq mi)
- Highest elevation: 474 m (1,555 ft)
- Lowest elevation: 90 m (300 ft)
- Population (2023): 733
  - Density: 19.2/km^{2} (49.6/sq mi)
- Time zone: UTC+01:00 (CET)
  - Summer (DST): UTC+02:00 (CEST)
- INSEE/Postal code: 30164 /30430
- ^{1} French Land Register data, which excludes lakes, ponds, glaciers > 1 km^{2} (0.386 sq mi or 247 acres) and river estuaries.

Méjannes-le-Clap (French pronunciation: [meʒan lə klap]; Occitan: Mejanas e lo Clap) is a commune in the Gard department in southern France. It is located 30 km north east of Alès, close to the river Cèze. It is a centre for outdoor activities and environmental tourism.

== Geography ==
=== Climate ===
Méjannes-le-Clap has a hot-summer Mediterranean climate (Köppen climate classification Csa). The average annual temperature in Méjannes-le-Clap is 13.6 °C (56.5 °F). The average annual rainfall is 1,000.8 mm (39.40 in) with October as the wettest month. The temperatures are highest on average in July, at around 23.1 °C (73.6 °F), and lowest in January, at around 5.2 °C (41.4 °F). The highest temperature ever recorded in Méjannes-le-Clap was 42.6 °C (108.7 °F) on 28 June 2019; the coldest temperature ever recorded was −11.7 °C (10.9 °F) on 15 December 2001.

Climate data for Méjannes-le-Clap (1991−2020 normals, extremes 1992−present)
Month	Jan	Feb	Mar	Apr	May	Jun	Jul	Aug	Sep	Oct	Nov	Dec	Year
Record high °C (°F)	21.0 (69.8)	24.4 (75.9)	27.4 (81.3)	29.1 (84.4)	34.3 (93.7)	42.6 (108.7)	38.1 (100.6)	41.0 (105.8)	36.1 (97.0)	30.2 (86.4)	23.8 (74.8)	19.4 (66.9)	42.6 (108.7)
Mean daily maximum °C (°F)	9.6 (49.3)	11.2 (52.2)	15.2 (59.4)	18.2 (64.8)	22.5 (72.5)	27.1 (80.8)	30.3 (86.5)	29.8 (85.6)	24.4 (75.9)	19.0 (66.2)	13.4 (56.1)	10.1 (50.2)	19.2 (66.6)
Daily mean °C (°F)	5.2 (41.4)	6.1 (43.0)	9.4 (48.9)	12.3 (54.1)	16.1 (61.0)	20.3 (68.5)	23.1 (73.6)	22.8 (73.0)	18.4 (65.1)	14.1 (57.4)	9.0 (48.2)	5.9 (42.6)	13.6 (56.5)
Mean daily minimum °C (°F)	0.8 (33.4)	1.0 (33.8)	3.6 (38.5)	6.4 (43.5)	9.8 (49.6)	13.6 (56.5)	15.9 (60.6)	15.7 (60.3)	12.4 (54.3)	9.3 (48.7)	4.7 (40.5)	1.6 (34.9)	7.9 (46.2)
Record low °C (°F)	−11.3 (11.7)	−11.3 (11.7)	−10.4 (13.3)	−4.7 (23.5)	1.3 (34.3)	5.5 (41.9)	7.4 (45.3)	6.1 (43.0)	4.4 (39.9)	−2.6 (27.3)	−8.1 (17.4)	−11.7 (10.9)	−11.7 (10.9)
Average precipitation mm (inches)	83.5 (3.29)	53.4 (2.10)	59.0 (2.32)	80.1 (3.15)	76.3 (3.00)	54.5 (2.15)	42.1 (1.66)	61.5 (2.42)	134.6 (5.30)	139.9 (5.51)	139.2 (5.48)	76.7 (3.02)	1,000.8 (39.40)
Average precipitation days (≥ 1.0 mm)	7.3	5.1	5.2	7.7	7.7	5.4	4.0	4.7	5.8	7.6	8.6	7.1	76.1
Source: Météo-France

== Population ==
Historical population
Year	Pop.	±% p.a.
1968	31	—
1975	34	+1.33%
1982	98	+16.33%
1990	223	+10.82%
1999	304	+3.50%
2007	446	+4.91%
2012	674	+8.61%
2017	710	+1.05%
2023	733	+0.53%
Source: INSEE

== See also ==
- Communes of the Gard department
