= Saint-Denis, Gard =

Saint-Denis
- Commune
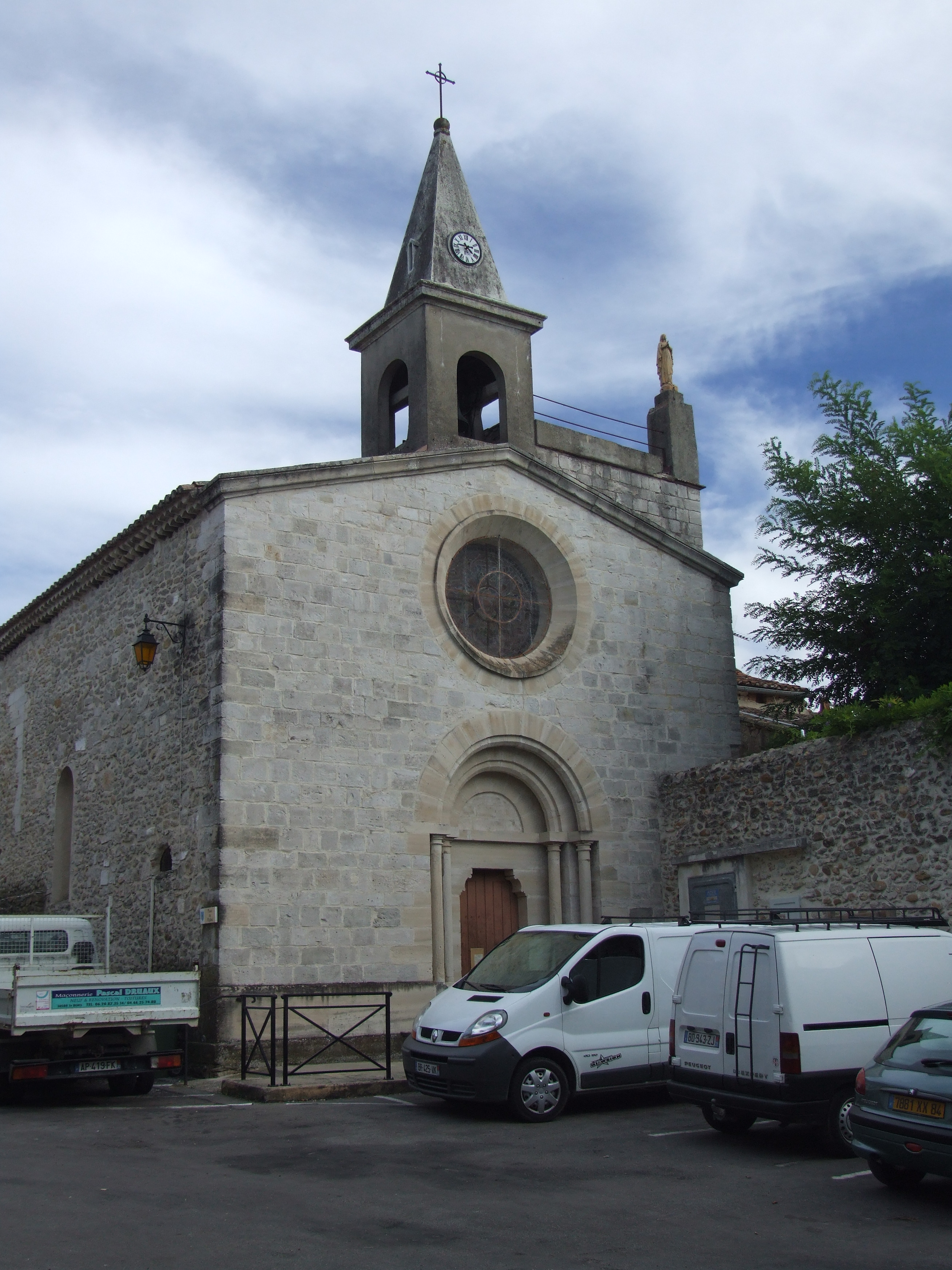
- The church of Saint-Denis

- Coat of arms
- Location of Saint-Denis
- Location within France Location within Occitanie
- Coordinates: 44°14′02″N 4°15′09″E
- Country: France
- Region: Occitania
- Department: Gard
- Arrondissement: Alès
- Canton: Rousson

Government
  - Mayor (2020–2026): Sylvette Molieres
- Area^{1}: 3.65 km^{2} (1.41 sq mi)
- Elevation: 200 m (660 ft)
- Highest elevation: 156 m (512 ft)
- Lowest elevation: 111 m (364 ft)
- Population (2023): 296
  - Density: 81.1/km^{2} (210/sq mi)
- Time zone: UTC+01:00 (CET)
  - Summer (DST): UTC+02:00 (CEST)
- INSEE/Postal code: 30247 /30500
- ^{1} French Land Register data, which excludes lakes, ponds, glaciers > 1 km^{2} (0.386 sq mi or 247 acres) and river estuaries.

Saint-Denis (French pronunciation: [sɛ̃ dəni]; Occitan: Sent Daunís) is a commune in the Gard department in southern France. It is around 15 km north-east of Alès.

== Population ==
Historical population
Year	Pop.	±% p.a.
1968	176	—
1975	144	−2.83%
1982	177	+2.99%
1990	190	+0.89%
1999	194	+0.23%
2007	223	+1.76%
2012	265	+3.51%
2017	294	+2.10%
2023	296	+0.11%
Source: INSEE

== See also ==
- Communes of the Gard department
