= Meyrannes =

- Commune
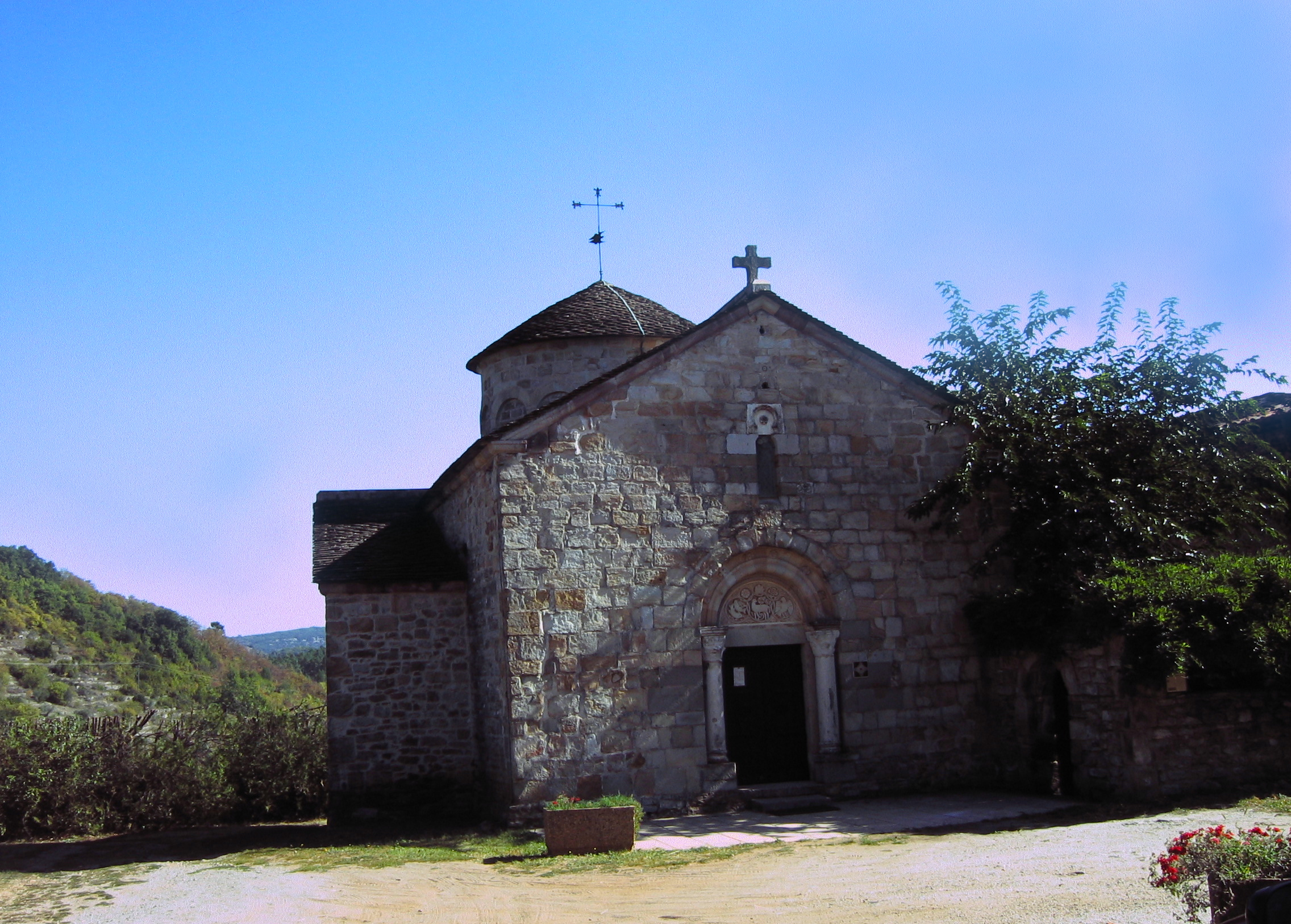
- The church of Meyrannes

- Coat of arms
- Location of Meyrannes
- Location within France Location within Occitanie
- Coordinates: 44°16′18″N 4°10′07″E
- Country: France
- Region: Occitania
- Department: Gard
- Arrondissement: Alès
- Canton: Rousson

Government
  - Mayor (2020–2026): Wladimir Bernard
- Area^{1}: 6.51 km^{2} (2.51 sq mi)
- Elevation: 150 m (490 ft)
- Highest elevation: 503 m (1,650 ft)
- Lowest elevation: 130 m (430 ft)
- Population (2023): 792
  - Density: 122/km^{2} (315/sq mi)
- Time zone: UTC+01:00 (CET)
  - Summer (DST): UTC+02:00 (CEST)
- INSEE/Postal code: 30167 /30410
- ^{1} French Land Register data, which excludes lakes, ponds, glaciers > 1 km^{2} (0.386 sq mi or 247 acres) and river estuaries.

Meyrannes (French pronunciation: [meʁan]; Occitan: Mairanas) is a commune in the Gard department in southern France.

== Population ==
Historical population
| Year | Pop. | ±% p.a. |
|---|---|---|
| 1968 | 1,167 | — |
| 1975 | 809 | −5.10% |
| 1982 | 756 | −0.96% |
| 1990 | 860 | +1.62% |
| 1999 | 843 | −0.22% |
| 2007 | 855 | +0.18% |
| 2012 | 842 | −0.31% |
| 2017 | 825 | −0.41% |
| 2023 | 792 | −0.68% |
Source: INSEE

== See also ==
- Communes of the Gard department
