= Saint-Brès, Gard =

Saint-Brès
- Commune
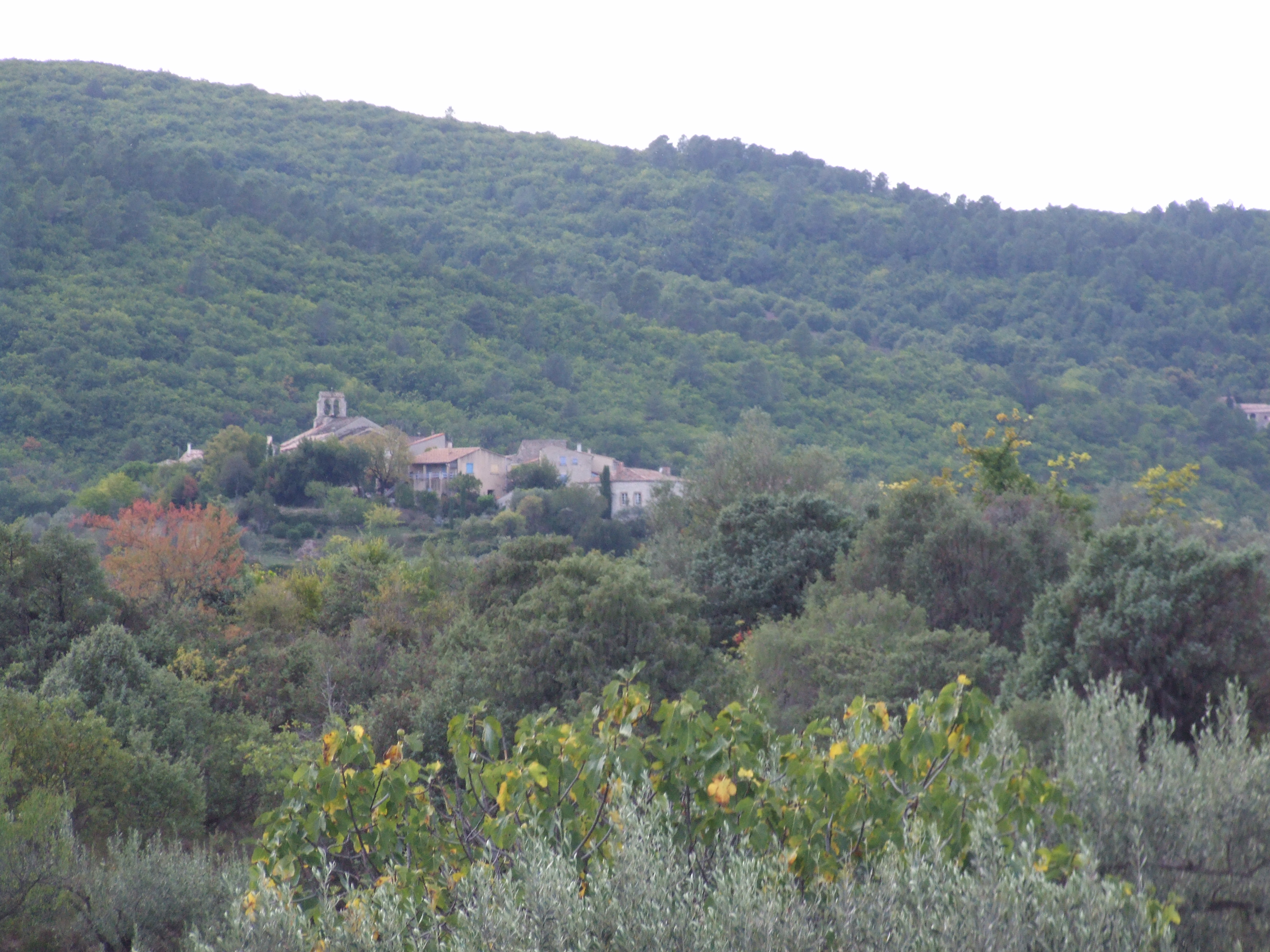

- Coat of arms
- Location of Saint-Brès
- Location within France Location within Occitanie
- Coordinates: 44°16′41″N 4°11′53″E
- Country: France
- Region: Occitania
- Department: Gard
- Arrondissement: Alès
- Canton: Rousson

Government
  - Mayor (2020–2026): Jean-Pierre Charpentier
- Area^{1}: 11.37 km^{2} (4.39 sq mi)
- Elevation: 170 m (560 ft)
- Highest elevation: 431 m (1,414 ft)
- Lowest elevation: 132 m (433 ft)
- Population (2023): 702
  - Density: 61.7/km^{2} (160/sq mi)
- Time zone: UTC+01:00 (CET)
  - Summer (DST): UTC+02:00 (CEST)
- INSEE/Postal code: 30237 /30500
- ^{1} French Land Register data, which excludes lakes, ponds, glaciers > 1 km^{2} (0.386 sq mi or 247 acres) and river estuaries.

Saint-Brès (French pronunciation: [sɛ̃ bʁɛs]; Occitan: Sent Breç) is a commune in the Gard department in southern France.

== Population ==
Historical population
Year	Pop.	±% p.a.
1968	533	—
1975	504	−0.80%
1982	524	+0.56%
1990	612	+1.96%
1999	533	−1.52%
2007	630	+2.11%
2012	625	−0.16%
2017	652	+0.85%
2023	702	+1.24%
Source: INSEE

== See also ==
- Communes of the Gard department
