= Tharaux =

- Commune
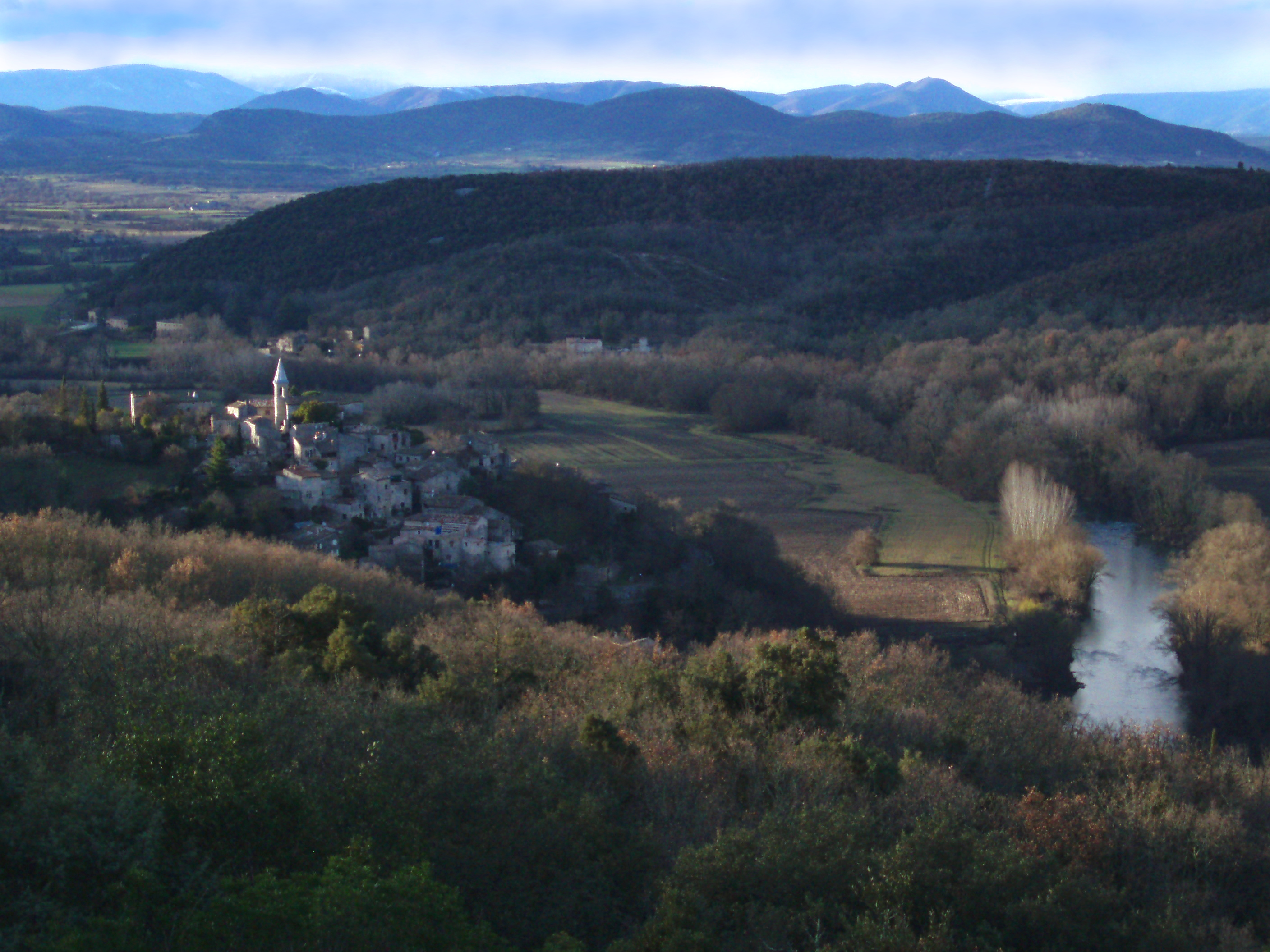
- A general view of Tharaux

- Coat of arms
- Location of Tharaux
- Location within France Location within Occitanie
- Coordinates: 44°14′30″N 4°18′44″E
- Country: France
- Region: Occitania
- Department: Gard
- Arrondissement: Alès
- Canton: Rousson

Government
  - Mayor (2020–2026): Denis Guillaume
- Area^{1}: 9.52 km^{2} (3.68 sq mi)
- Elevation: 160 m (520 ft)
- Highest elevation: 346 m (1,135 ft)
- Lowest elevation: 96 m (315 ft)
- Population (2023): 43
  - Density: 4.5/km^{2} (12/sq mi)
- Time zone: UTC+01:00 (CET)
  - Summer (DST): UTC+02:00 (CEST)
- INSEE/Postal code: 30327 /30430
- ^{1} French Land Register data, which excludes lakes, ponds, glaciers > 1 km^{2} (0.386 sq mi or 247 acres) and river estuaries.

Tharaux (French pronunciation: [taʁo]; Occitan: Taraus) is a commune in the Gard department in southern France.

== Population ==
Historical population
Year	Pop.	±% p.a.
1968	32	—
1975	20	−6.49%
1982	39	+10.01%
1990	50	+3.15%
1999	55	+1.06%
2007	63	+1.71%
2012	56	−2.33%
2017	56	+0.00%
2023	43	−4.31%
Source: INSEE

== See also ==
- Communes of the Gard department
