= Bordezac =

Commune in Occitanie, France

- Commune
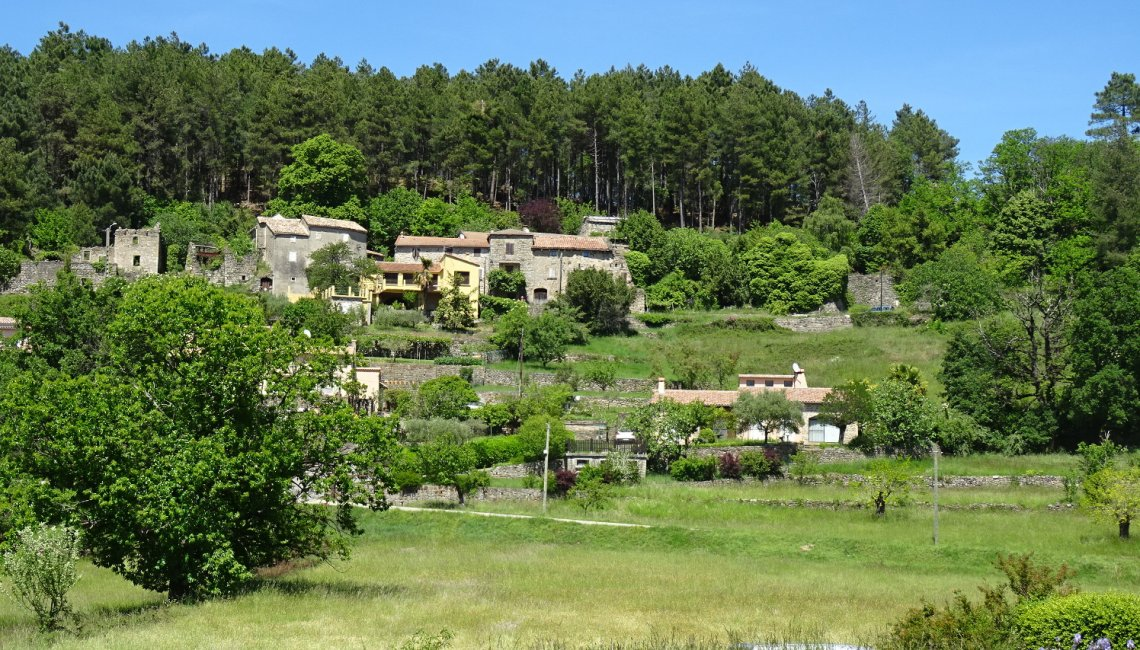

- Coat of arms
- Location of Bordezac
- Location within France Location within Occitanie
- Coordinates: 44°18′56″N 4°04′38″E
- Country: France
- Region: Occitania
- Department: Gard
- Arrondissement: Alès
- Canton: Rousson

Government
  - Mayor (2024–2026): Thierry Laurent
- Area^{1}: 9.05 km^{2} (3.49 sq mi)
- Elevation: 480 m (1,570 ft)
- Highest elevation: 488 m (1,601 ft)
- Lowest elevation: 166 m (545 ft)
- Population (2023): 387
  - Density: 42.8/km^{2} (111/sq mi)
- Time zone: UTC+01:00 (CET)
  - Summer (DST): UTC+02:00 (CEST)
- INSEE/Postal code: 30045 /30160
- ^{1} French Land Register data, which excludes lakes, ponds, glaciers > 1 km^{2} (0.386 sq mi or 247 acres) and river estuaries.

Bordezac (French pronunciation: [bɔʁdəzak]; Occitan: Bordesac) is a commune in the Gard department in southern France.

== Population ==
Historical population
Year	Pop.	±% p.a.
1968	459	—
1975	418	−1.33%
1982	424	+0.20%
1990	430	+0.18%
1999	402	−0.75%
2007	390	−0.38%
2012	370	−1.05%
2017	393	+1.21%
2023	387	−0.26%
Source: INSEE

== See also ==
- Communes of the Gard department
