= Courry =

- Commune
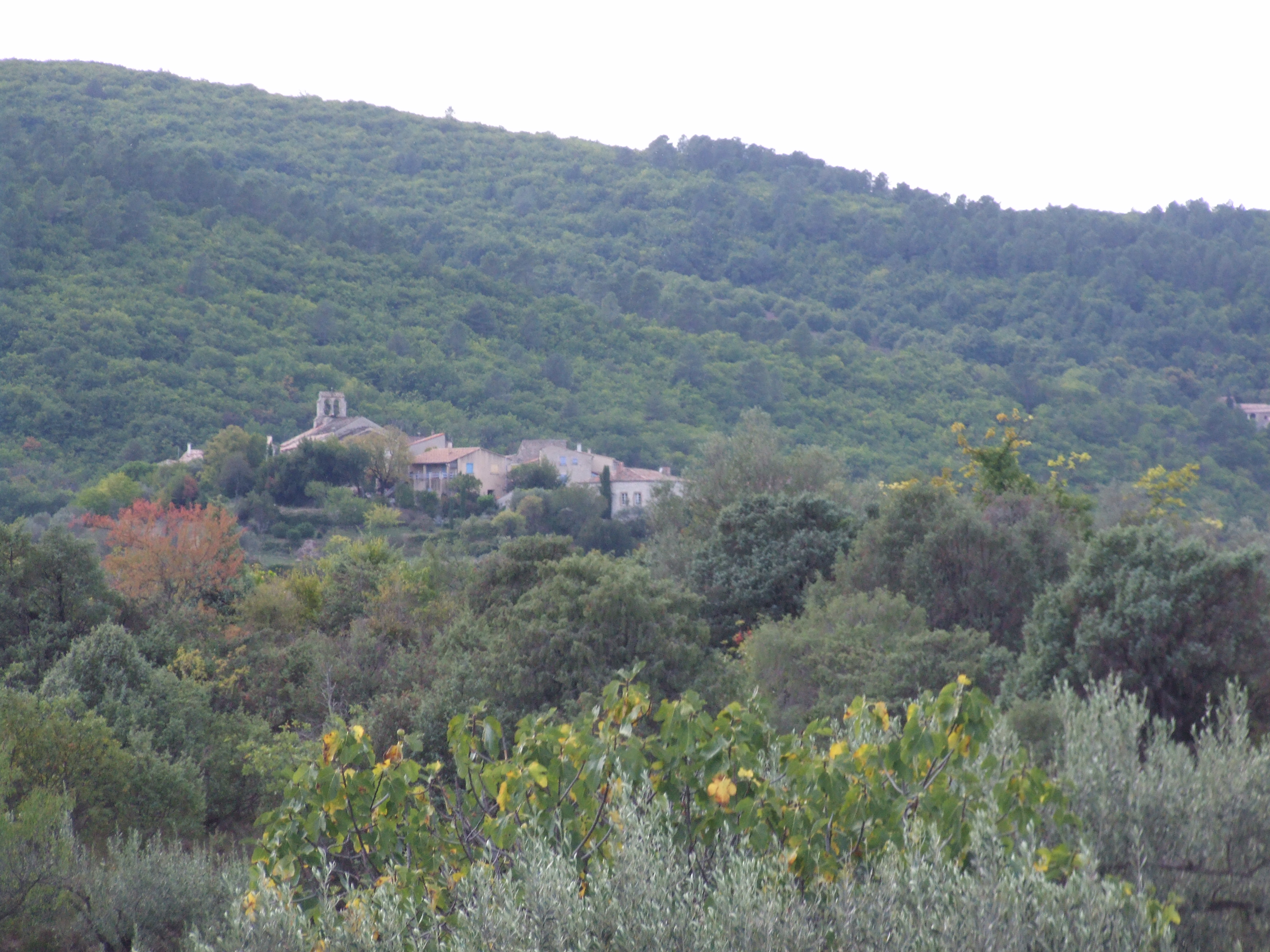
- A general view of Courry
- Location of Courry
- Location within France Location within Occitanie
- Coordinates: 44°18′00″N 4°09′23″E
- Country: France
- Region: Occitania
- Department: Gard
- Arrondissement: Alès
- Canton: Rousson

Government
  - Mayor (2020–2026): Jean Bernard
- Area^{1}: 8.22 km^{2} (3.17 sq mi)
- Elevation: 347 m (1,138 ft)
- Highest elevation: 516 m (1,693 ft)
- Lowest elevation: 198 m (650 ft)
- Population (2023): 281
  - Density: 34.2/km^{2} (88.5/sq mi)
- Time zone: UTC+01:00 (CET)
  - Summer (DST): UTC+02:00 (CEST)
- INSEE/Postal code: 30097 /30500
- ^{1} French Land Register data, which excludes lakes, ponds, glaciers > 1 km^{2} (0.386 sq mi or 247 acres) and river estuaries.

Courry (French pronunciation: [kuʁi]; Occitan: Corri) is a commune in the Gard department in southern France.

== Population ==
Historical population
Year	Pop.	±% p.a.
1968	202	—
1975	179	−1.71%
1982	212	+2.45%
1990	218	+0.35%
1999	254	+1.71%
2007	304	+2.27%
2012	302	−0.13%
2017	279	−1.57%
2023	281	+0.12%
Source: INSEE

== See also ==
- Communes of the Gard department
