= Barjac, Gard =

Commune in Occitanie, France

Barjac
- Commune
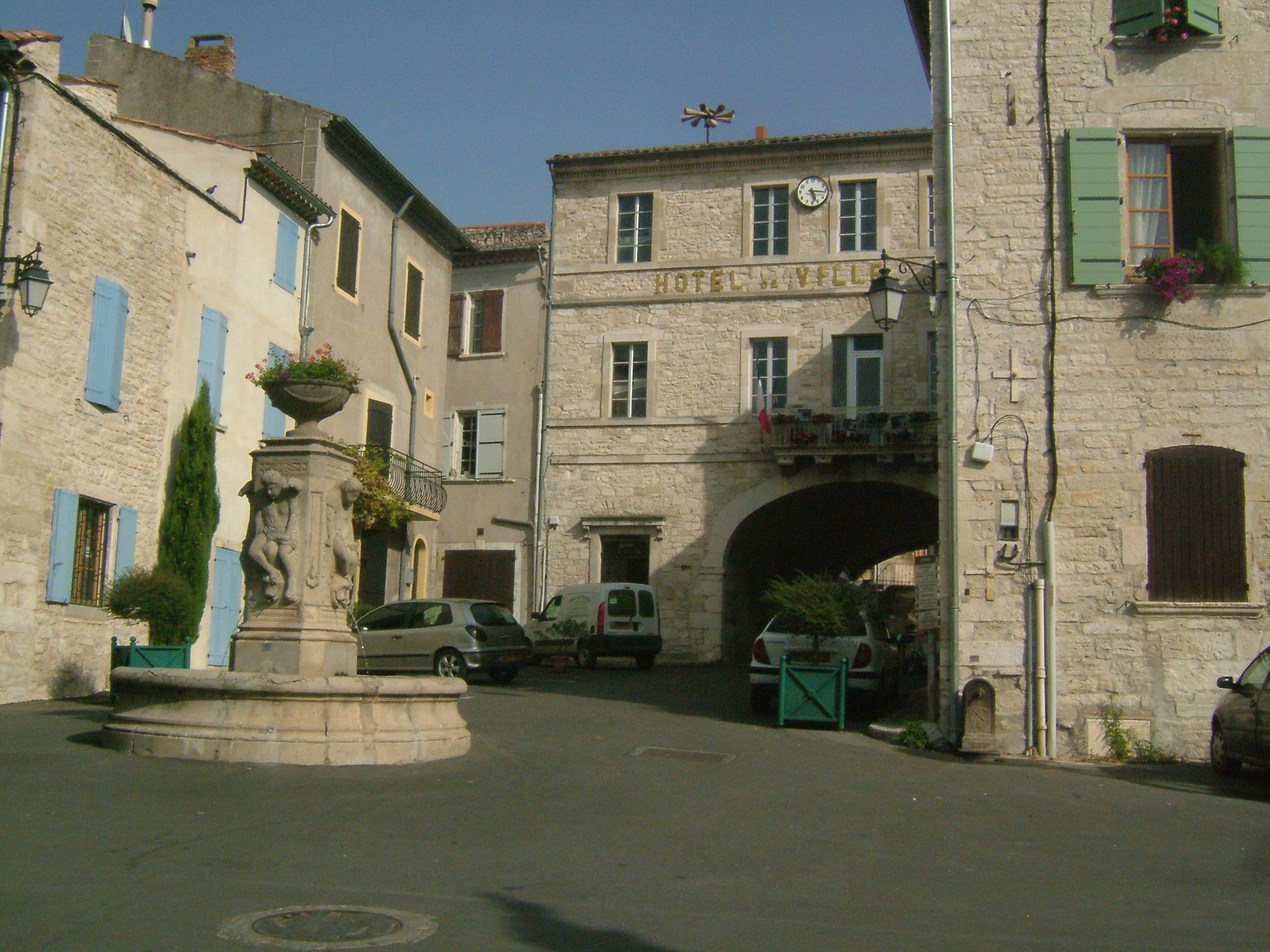
- Town hall

- Coat of arms
- Location of Barjac
- Location within France Location within Occitanie
- Coordinates: 44°18′32″N 4°20′55″E
- Country: France
- Region: Occitania
- Department: Gard
- Arrondissement: Alès
- Canton: Rousson

Government
  - Mayor (2020–2026): Edouard Chaulet
- Area^{1}: 42.72 km^{2} (16.49 sq mi)
- Elevation: 250 m (820 ft)
- Highest elevation: 364 m (1,194 ft)
- Lowest elevation: 112 m (367 ft)
- Population (2023): 1,608
  - Density: 37.64/km^{2} (97.49/sq mi)
- Time zone: UTC+01:00 (CET)
  - Summer (DST): UTC+02:00 (CEST)
- INSEE/Postal code: 30029 /30430
- ^{1} French Land Register data, which excludes lakes, ponds, glaciers > 1 km^{2} (0.386 sq mi or 247 acres) and river estuaries.

Barjac (French pronunciation: [baʁʒak]) is a commune in the Gard department in southern France.

The valley of the river Cèze lies to the south, and the river Ardèche is 10 km (6.2 mi) to the north.

Barjac is a Renaissance town. The old city centre retains ancient narrow streets, squares and houses of that time. The Château of the Counts of the Roure with its stone courtyard, once called the "Citadel", has been rebuilt several times from the twelfth century. This imposing edifice now features a library in the former stables, and a cinema in the old kitchens. The chateau is the venue for the festival "Chansons de Paroles" (Songs and Words) held annually in late July.

The contemporary German artist Anselm Kiefer has had his studio, called the Ribaute, in Barjac since 1993 in a former industrial wasteland of 35 hectares.

== Population ==
Historical population
Year	Pop.	±% p.a.
1968	1,056	—
1975	1,091	+0.47%
1982	1,241	+1.86%
1990	1,361	+1.16%
1999	1,379	+0.15%
2007	1,503	+1.08%
2012	1,552	+0.64%
2017	1,596	+0.56%
2023	1,608	+0.12%
Source: INSEE

== See also ==
- Côtes du Vivarais AOC
- Communes of the Gard department
