= Potelières =

- Commune
- Coat of arms
- Location of Potelières
- Location within France Location within Occitanie
- Coordinates: 44°13′25″N 4°14′21″E
- Country: France
- Region: Occitania
- Department: Gard
- Arrondissement: Alès
- Canton: Rousson
- Intercommunality: Cèze Cévennes

Government
  - Mayor (2020–2026): Jean-Paul André
- Area^{1}: 6.47 km^{2} (2.50 sq mi)
- Highest elevation: 202 m (663 ft)
- Lowest elevation: 115 m (377 ft)
- Population (2023): 363
  - Density: 56.1/km^{2} (145/sq mi)
- Time zone: UTC+01:00 (CET)
  - Summer (DST): UTC+02:00 (CEST)
- INSEE/Postal code: 30204 /30500
- ^{1} French Land Register data, which excludes lakes, ponds, glaciers > 1 km^{2} (0.386 sq mi or 247 acres) and river estuaries.

Potelières (French pronunciation: [pɔt(ə)ljɛʁ]; Occitan: Potelièiras) is a commune in the Gard department in southern France.

== Population ==
Historical population
Year	Pop.	±% p.a.
1968	259	—
1975	224	−2.05%
1982	238	+0.87%
1990	256	+0.92%
1999	255	−0.04%
2007	342	+3.74%
2012	327	−0.89%
2017	373	+2.67%
2023	363	−0.45%
Source: INSEE

== See also ==
- Communes of the Gard department
