= Peyremale =

- Commune
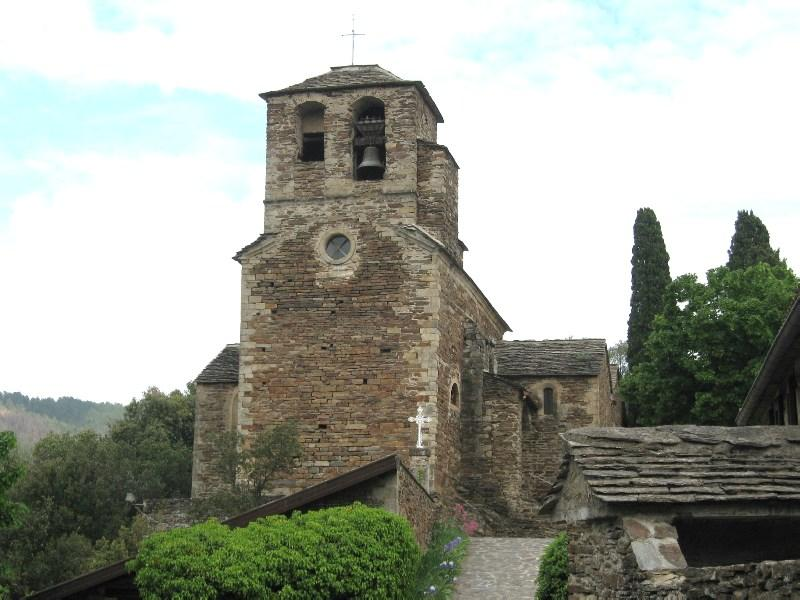
- The church of Peyremale

- Coat of arms
- Location of Peyremale
- Location within France Location within Occitanie
- Coordinates: 44°18′05″N 4°03′46″E
- Country: France
- Region: Occitania
- Department: Gard
- Arrondissement: Alès
- Canton: Rousson

Government
  - Mayor (2020–2026): Guy Silhol
- Area^{1}: 8.62 km^{2} (3.33 sq mi)
- Highest elevation: 619 m (2,031 ft)
- Lowest elevation: 162 m (531 ft)
- Population (2023): 272
  - Density: 31.6/km^{2} (81.7/sq mi)
- Time zone: UTC+01:00 (CET)
  - Summer (DST): UTC+02:00 (CEST)
- INSEE/Postal code: 30194 /30160
- ^{1} French Land Register data, which excludes lakes, ponds, glaciers > 1 km^{2} (0.386 sq mi or 247 acres) and river estuaries.

Peyremale (French pronunciation: [pɛʁmal]; Occitan: Pèiramala) is a commune in the Gard department in southern France.

== Population ==
Historical population
Year	Pop.	±% p.a.
1968	371	—
1975	305	−2.76%
1982	274	−1.52%
1990	273	−0.05%
1999	281	+0.32%
2007	272	−0.41%
2012	288	+1.15%
2017	285	−0.21%
2023	272	−0.78%
Source: INSEE

== About Peyremale ==
Peyremale is a typical Cévennes village that consists of several places and hamlets scattered along the rivers or Cèze and Luech and is bordering mountains.

Romanesque church of the 12th century, perched on a rocky outcrop, a view is offered on the old medieval hamlets Mercoire the Puech, the Elzière, as well as the most recent hamlets such as Claux, Mas Herm, the Chambonnet and Droulhèdes.

The people of Peyremale are called Peyremaliens.

== See also ==
- Communes of the Gard department
