= Rivières, Gard =

Rivières
- Commune
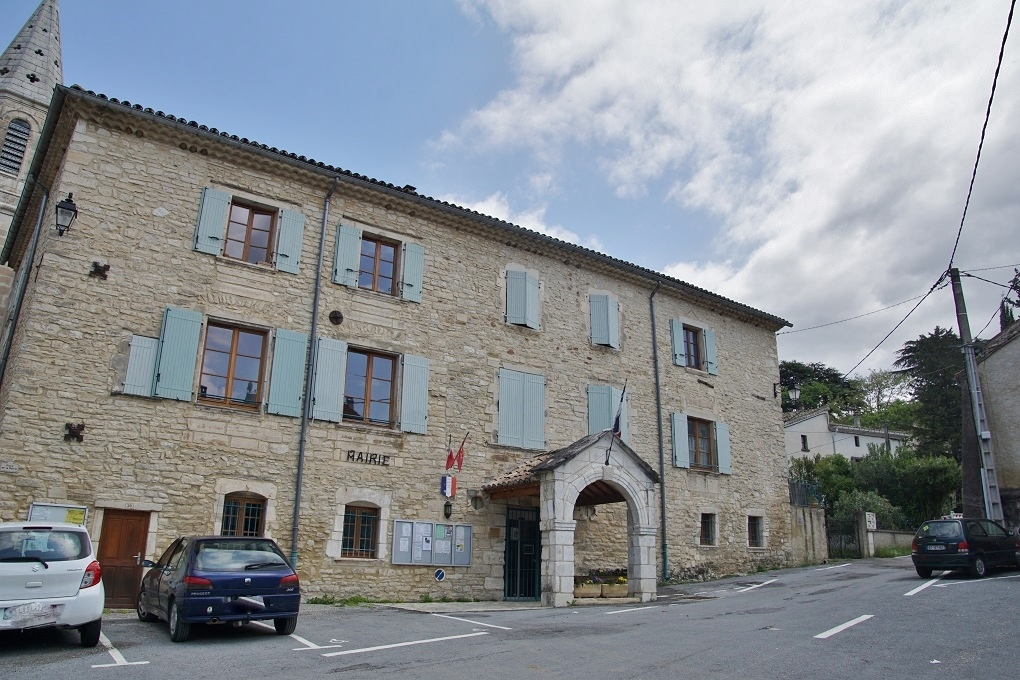
- Town hall

- Coat of arms
- Location of Rivières
- Location within France Location within Occitanie
- Coordinates: 44°13′38″N 4°16′32″E
- Country: France
- Region: Occitania
- Department: Gard
- Arrondissement: Alès
- Canton: Rousson

Government
  - Mayor (2020–2026): Jean-Marie Itier
- Area^{1}: 9.96 km^{2} (3.85 sq mi)
- Elevation: 150 m (490 ft)
- Highest elevation: 414 m (1,358 ft)
- Lowest elevation: 109 m (358 ft)
- Population (2023): 417
  - Density: 41.9/km^{2} (108/sq mi)
- Time zone: UTC+01:00 (CET)
  - Summer (DST): UTC+02:00 (CEST)
- INSEE/Postal code: 30215 /30430
- ^{1} French Land Register data, which excludes lakes, ponds, glaciers > 1 km^{2} (0.386 sq mi or 247 acres) and river estuaries.

Rivières (French pronunciation: [ʁivjɛʁ]; Occitan: Ribièiras), sometimes referred to as Rivières-de-Theyrargues, is a commune in the Gard department in southern France.

== Population ==
Historical population
Year	Pop.	±% p.a.
1968	240	—
1975	239	−0.06%
1982	238	−0.06%
1990	227	−0.59%
1999	234	+0.34%
2007	323	+4.11%
2012	341	+1.09%
2017	362	+1.20%
2023	417	+2.39%
Source: INSEE

== See also ==
- François Craenhals
- Communes of the Gard department
