= Arrondissement of Alès =

Coordinates: 44°07′25″N 4°05′07″E

Alès
- Arrondissement
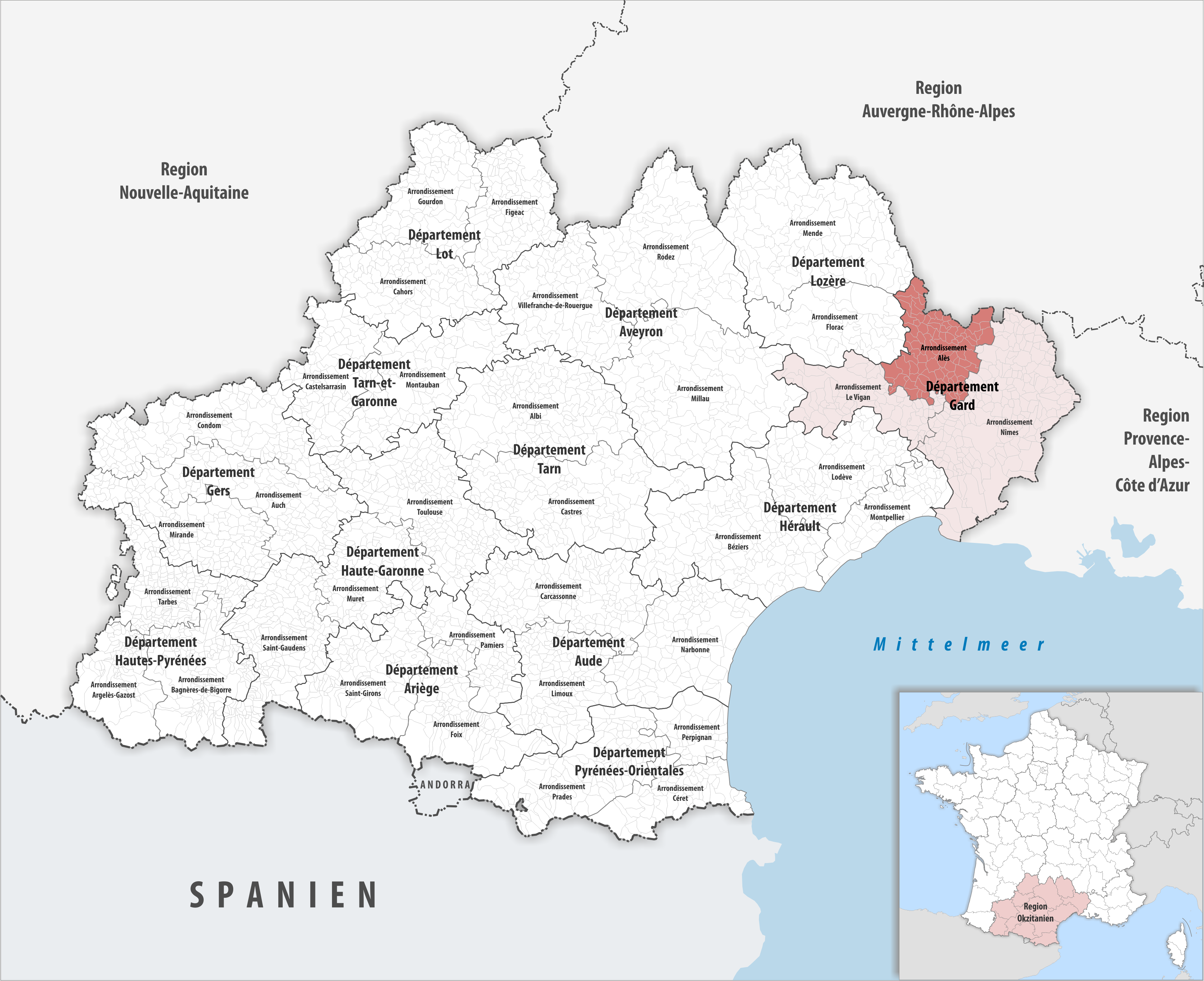
- Location within the region Occitanie
- Country: France
- Region: Occitania
- Department: Gard
- No. of communes: {{{nbcomm}}}
- Area: 1,273.9 km^{2} (491.9 sq mi)
- Population (2023): 156,595
  - Density: 122.93/km^{2} (318.38/sq mi)
- INSEE code: 301

The arrondissement of Alès is an arrondissement of France in the Gard department in the Occitanie region. It has 95 communes. Its population is 153,189 (2021), and its area is 1,273.9 km^{2} (491.9 sq mi).

== Composition ==
The communes of the arrondissement of Alès, and their INSEE codes, are:

1. Alès (30007)
2. Allègre-les-Fumades (30008)
3. Anduze (30010)
4. Aujac (30022)
5. Bagard (30027)
6. Barjac (30029)
7. Bessèges (30037)
8. Boisset-et-Gaujac (30042)
9. Bonnevaux (30044)
10. Bordezac (30045)
11. Boucoiran-et-Nozières (30046)
12. Branoux-les-Taillades (30051)
13. Brignon (30053)
14. Brouzet-lès-Alès (30055)
15. Castelnau-Valence (30072)
16. Cendras (30077)
17. Chambon (30079)
18. Chamborigaud (30080)
19. Concoules (30090)
20. Courry (30097)
21. Cruviers-Lascours (30100)
22. Deaux (30101)
23. Euzet (30109)
24. Gagnières (30120)
25. Générargues (30129)
26. Génolhac (30130)
27. La Grand-Combe (30132)
28. Lamelouze (30137)
29. Laval-Pradel (30142)
30. Lézan (30147)
31. Les Mages (30152)
32. Malons-et-Elze (30153)
33. Martignargues (30158)
34. Le Martinet (30159)
35. Massanes (30161)
36. Massillargues-Attuech (30162)
37. Méjannes-le-Clap (30164)
38. Méjannes-lès-Alès (30165)
39. Meyrannes (30167)
40. Mialet (30168)
41. Molières-sur-Cèze (30171)
42. Mons (30173)
43. Monteils (30177)
44. Navacelles (30187)
45. Ners (30188)
46. Peyremale (30194)
47. Les Plans (30197)
48. Ponteils-et-Brésis (30201)
49. Portes (30203)
50. Potelières (30204)
51. Ribaute-les-Tavernes (30214)
52. Rivières (30215)
53. Robiac-Rochessadoule (30216)
54. Rochegude (30218)
55. Rousson (30223)
56. Saint-Ambroix (30227)
57. Saint-Bonnet-de-Salendrinque (30236)
58. Saint-Brès (30237)
59. Saint-Césaire-de-Gauzignan (30240)
60. Saint-Christol-lès-Alès (30243)
61. Saint-Denis (30247)
62. Sainte-Cécile-d'Andorge (30239)
63. Sainte-Croix-de-Caderle (30246)
64. Saint-Étienne-de-l'Olm (30250)
65. Saint-Florent-sur-Auzonnet (30253)
66. Saint-Hilaire-de-Brethmas (30259)
67. Saint-Hippolyte-de-Caton (30261)
68. Saint-Jean-de-Ceyrargues (30264)
69. Saint-Jean-de-Maruéjols-et-Avéjan (30266)
70. Saint-Jean-de-Serres (30267)
71. Saint-Jean-de-Valériscle (30268)
72. Saint-Jean-du-Gard (30269)
73. Saint-Jean-du-Pin (30270)
74. Saint-Julien-de-Cassagnas (30271)
75. Saint-Julien-les-Rosiers (30274)
76. Saint-Just-et-Vacquières (30275)
77. Saint-Martin-de-Valgalgues (30284)
78. Saint-Maurice-de-Cazevieille (30285)
79. Saint-Paul-la-Coste (30291)
80. Saint-Privat-de-Champclos (30293)
81. Saint-Privat-des-Vieux (30294)
82. Saint-Sébastien-d'Aigrefeuille (30298)
83. Saint-Victor-de-Malcap (30303)
84. Salindres (30305)
85. Les Salles-du-Gardon (30307)
86. Sénéchas (30316)
87. Servas (30318)
88. Seynes (30320)
89. Soustelle (30323)
90. Tharaux (30327)
91. Thoiras-Corbès (30329)
92. Tornac (30330)
93. Vabres (30335)
94. La Vernarède (30345)
95. Vézénobres (30348)

== History ==
The arrondissement of Alès was created in 1800. At the January 2017 reorganisation of the arrondissements of Gard, it gained four communes from the arrondissement of Le Vigan, and it lost two communes to the arrondissement of Nîmes and six communes to the arrondissement of Le Vigan.

As a result of the reorganisation of the cantons of France which came into effect in 2015, the borders of the cantons are no longer related to the borders of the arrondissements. The cantons of the arrondissement of Alès were, as of January 2015:

1. Alès-Nord-Est
2. Alès-Ouest
3. Alès-Sud-Est
4. Anduze
5. Barjac
6. Bessèges
7. Génolhac
8. La Grand-Combe
9. Lédignan
10. Saint-Ambroix
11. Saint-Jean-du-Gard
12. Vézénobres
