= Saint-Privat-de-Champclos =

- Commune
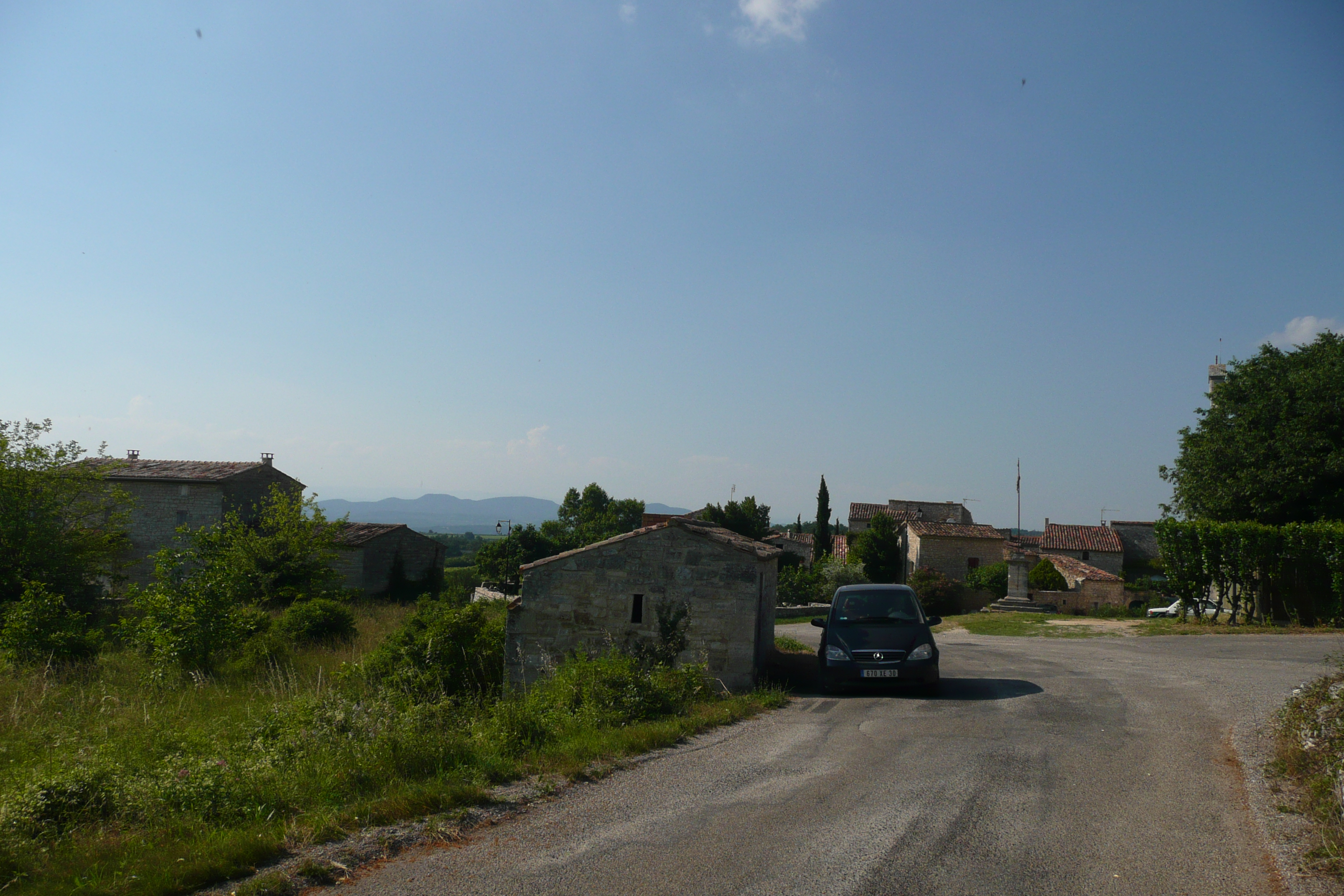
- A general view of Saint-Privat-de-Champclos

- Coat of arms
- Location of Saint-Privat-de-Champclos
- Location within France Location within Occitanie
- Coordinates: 44°17′09″N 4°21′31″E
- Country: France
- Region: Occitania
- Department: Gard
- Arrondissement: Alès
- Canton: Rousson

Government
  - Mayor (2020–2026): Jean-François Flandin
- Area^{1}: 11.64 km^{2} (4.49 sq mi)
- Elevation: 250 m (820 ft)
- Highest elevation: 279 m (915 ft)
- Lowest elevation: 90 m (300 ft)
- Population (2023): 324
  - Density: 27.8/km^{2} (72.1/sq mi)
- Time zone: UTC+01:00 (CET)
  - Summer (DST): UTC+02:00 (CEST)
- INSEE/Postal code: 30293 /30430
- ^{1} French Land Register data, which excludes lakes, ponds, glaciers > 1 km^{2} (0.386 sq mi or 247 acres) and river estuaries.

Saint-Privat-de-Champclos is a commune in the Gard department in the Occitania region in southern France. It is part of the canton of Rousson and of the arrondissement of Alès. Saint-Privat-de-Champclos has the INSEE code 30293, and the postal code is 30430. The area of Saint-Privat-de-Champclos is 11.64 km^{2}.

== Population ==
Historical population
| Year | Pop. | ±% p.a. |
|---|---|---|
| 1968 | 173 | — |
| 1975 | 173 | +0.00% |
| 1982 | 189 | +1.27% |
| 1990 | 212 | +1.45% |
| 1999 | 203 | −0.48% |
| 2007 | 294 | +4.74% |
| 2012 | 329 | +2.28% |
| 2017 | 344 | +0.90% |
| 2023 | 324 | −0.99% |
Source: INSEE

== See also ==
- Communes of the Gard department
- Côtes du Vivarais AOC
