= Saint-Florent-sur-Auzonnet =

- Commune
- Coat of arms
- Location of Saint-Florent-sur-Auzonnet
- Location within France Location within Occitanie
- Coordinates: 44°14′35″N 4°06′43″E
- Country: France
- Region: Occitania
- Department: Gard
- Arrondissement: Alès
- Canton: Rousson
- Intercommunality: Alès Agglomération

Government
  - Mayor (2024–2026): Denis Kucharczak
- Area^{1}: 9.31 km^{2} (3.59 sq mi)
- Elevation: 227 m (745 ft)
- Highest elevation: 542 m (1,778 ft)
- Lowest elevation: 213 m (699 ft)
- Population (2023): 1,218
  - Density: 131/km^{2} (339/sq mi)
- Time zone: UTC+01:00 (CET)
  - Summer (DST): UTC+02:00 (CEST)
- INSEE/Postal code: 30253 /30960
- ^{1} French Land Register data, which excludes lakes, ponds, glaciers > 1 km^{2} (0.386 sq mi or 247 acres) and river estuaries.

Saint-Florent-sur-Auzonnet (French pronunciation: [sɛ̃ flɔʁɑ̃ syʁ ozɔnɛ]; Occitan: Sent Florenç d'Ausona) is a commune in the Gard department in southern France.

== Population ==
Historical population
Year	Pop.	±% p.a.
1968	2,146	—
1975	1,620	−3.94%
1982	1,520	−0.91%
1990	1,363	−1.35%
1999	1,126	−2.10%
2007	1,138	+0.13%
2012	1,221	+1.42%
2017	1,173	−0.80%
2023	1,218	+0.63%
Source: INSEE

== See also ==
- Communes of the Gard department
