= Saint-Jean-de-Valériscle =

Saint-Jean-de-Valériscle Sent Joan de Ceba (Occitan)
- Commune
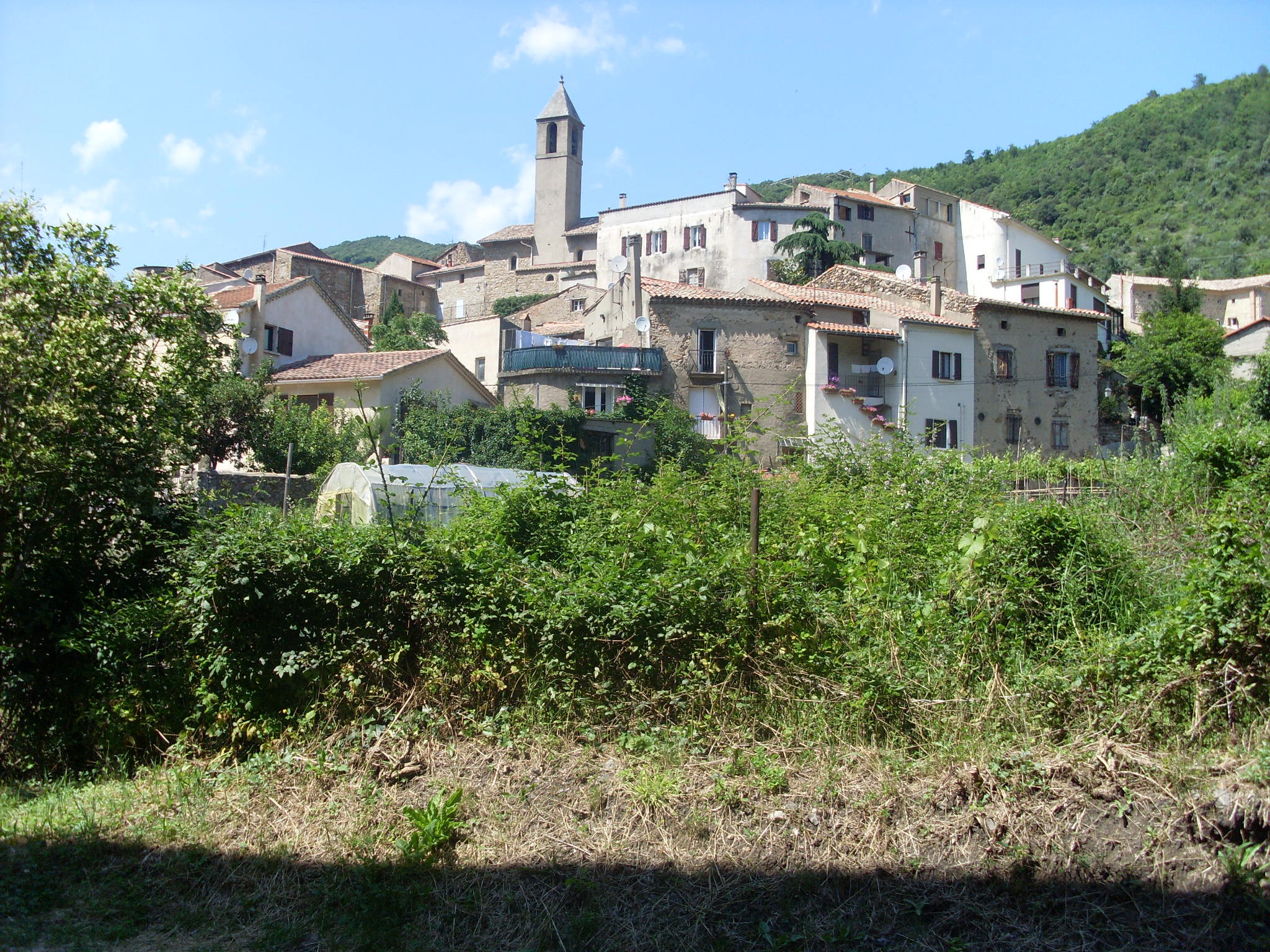
- A general view of Saint-Jean-de-Valériscle

- Coat of arms
- Location of Saint-Jean-de-Valériscle
- Location within France Location within Occitanie
- Coordinates: 44°14′02″N 4°08′35″E
- Country: France
- Region: Occitania
- Department: Gard
- Arrondissement: Alès
- Canton: Rousson
- Intercommunality: Alès Agglomération

Government
  - Mayor (2022–2026): Marc Jekal
- Area^{1}: 8.15 km^{2} (3.15 sq mi)
- Elevation: 210 m (690 ft)
- Highest elevation: 529 m (1,736 ft)
- Lowest elevation: 184 m (604 ft)
- Population (2023): 589
  - Density: 72.3/km^{2} (187/sq mi)
- Demonym: Saint-Jeannais
- Time zone: UTC+01:00 (CET)
  - Summer (DST): UTC+02:00 (CEST)
- INSEE/Postal code: 30268 /30960
- Website: saintjeandevaleriscle.com
- ^{1} French Land Register data, which excludes lakes, ponds, glaciers > 1 km^{2} (0.386 sq mi or 247 acres) and river estuaries.

Saint-Jean-de-Valériscle (French pronunciation: [sɛ̃ ʒɑ̃ də valeʁiskl]; Occitan: Sent Joan de Ceba) is a commune in the Gard department in the Occitania region in Southern France.

It is the birthplace of charity organiser Geneviève de Gaulle-Anthonioz (1920–2002), a member of the French Resistance in World War II and niece of Charles de Gaulle.

== Demographics ==
Historical population
Year	Pop.	±% p.a.
1968	1,282	—
1975	824	−6.12%
1982	742	−1.49%
1990	672	−1.23%
1999	716	+0.71%
2007	728	+0.21%
2012	704	−0.67%
2017	669	−1.01%
2023	589	−2.10%
Source: INSEE

== See also ==
- Communes of the Gard department
