= Gagnières =

- Commune
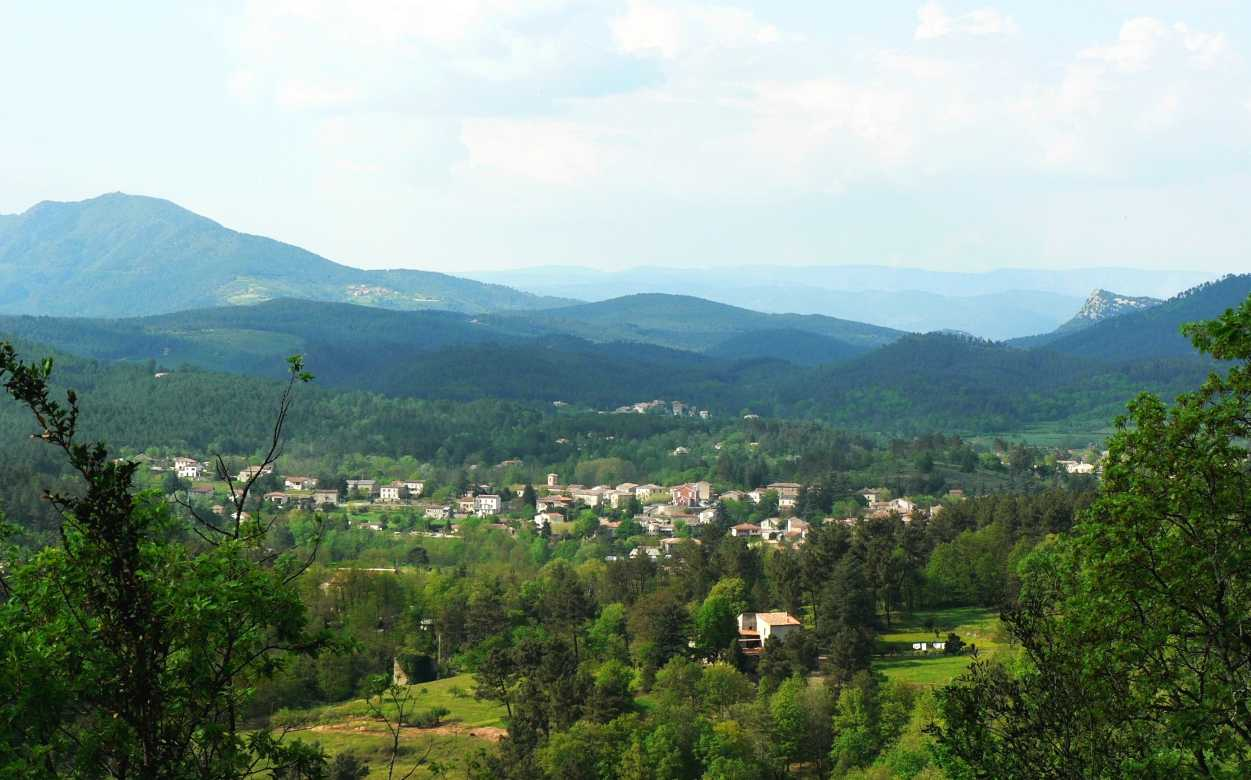
- A general view of Gagnières

- Coat of arms
- Location of Gagnières
- Location within France Location within Occitanie
- Coordinates: 44°18′26″N 4°07′48″E
- Country: France
- Region: Occitania
- Department: Gard
- Arrondissement: Alès
- Canton: Rousson

Government
  - Mayor (2020–2026): Olivier Martin
- Area^{1}: 11.22 km^{2} (4.33 sq mi)
- Elevation: 192 m (630 ft)
- Highest elevation: 516 m (1,693 ft)
- Lowest elevation: 159 m (522 ft)
- Population (2023): 1,102
  - Density: 98.22/km^{2} (254.4/sq mi)
- Time zone: UTC+01:00 (CET)
  - Summer (DST): UTC+02:00 (CEST)
- INSEE/Postal code: 30120 /30160
- ^{1} French Land Register data, which excludes lakes, ponds, glaciers > 1 km^{2} (0.386 sq mi or 247 acres) and river estuaries.

Gagnières (French pronunciation: [ɡaɲɛʁ]; Occitan: Castilhon de Ganhièira) is a commune in the Gard department in southern France.

== Population ==
Historical population
| Year | Pop. | ±% p.a. |
|---|---|---|
| 1968 | 1,194 | — |
| 1975 | 1,045 | −1.89% |
| 1982 | 920 | −1.80% |
| 1990 | 878 | −0.58% |
| 1999 | 919 | +0.51% |
| 2007 | 1,064 | +1.85% |
| 2012 | 1,140 | +1.39% |
| 2017 | 1,121 | −0.34% |
| 2023 | 1,102 | −0.28% |
Source: INSEE

== See also ==
- Communes of the Gard department
