= Rochegude, Gard =

Rochegude
- Commune
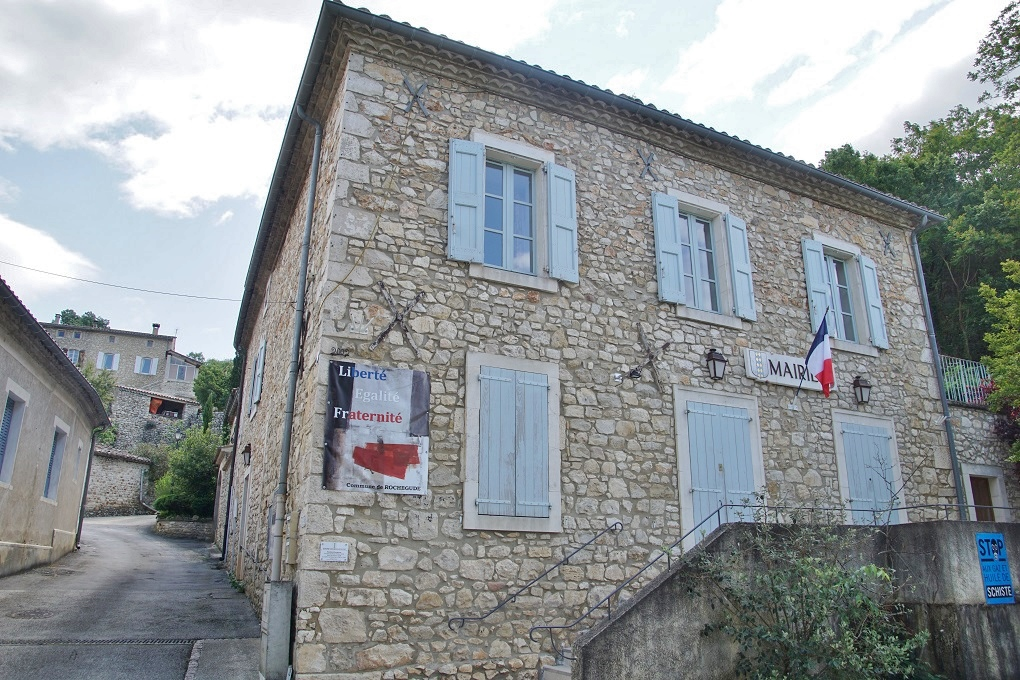
- Town hall

- Coat of arms
- Location of Rochegude
- Location within France Location within Occitanie
- Coordinates: 44°14′23″N 4°17′48″E
- Country: France
- Region: Occitania
- Department: Gard
- Arrondissement: Alès
- Canton: Rousson

Government
  - Mayor (2020–2026): Patrick Dumas
- Area^{1}: 11.94 km^{2} (4.61 sq mi)
- Elevation: 150 m (490 ft)
- Highest elevation: 365 m (1,198 ft)
- Lowest elevation: 101 m (331 ft)
- Population (2023): 243
  - Density: 20.4/km^{2} (52.7/sq mi)
- Time zone: UTC+01:00 (CET)
  - Summer (DST): UTC+02:00 (CEST)
- INSEE/Postal code: 30218 /30430
- ^{1} French Land Register data, which excludes lakes, ponds, glaciers > 1 km^{2} (0.386 sq mi or 247 acres) and river estuaries.

Rochegude (French pronunciation: [ʁɔʃɡyd]; Occitan: Ròchaguda) is a commune in the Gard department in southern France.

== Population ==
Historical population
Year	Pop.	±% p.a.
1968	197	—
1975	218	+1.46%
1982	215	−0.20%
1990	176	−2.47%
1999	177	+0.06%
2007	209	+2.10%
2012	220	+1.03%
2017	252	+2.75%
2023	243	−0.60%
Source: INSEE

== See also ==
- Communes of the Gard department
