= Saint-Ambroix, Gard =

Saint-Ambroix
- Commune
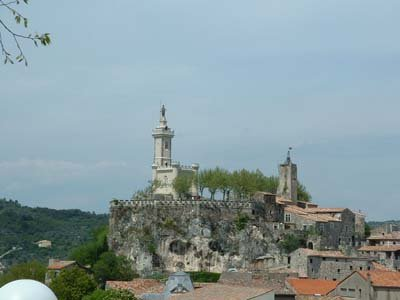
- Dugas Rock

- Coat of arms
- Location of Saint-Ambroix
- Location within France Location within Occitanie
- Coordinates: 44°15′41″N 4°11′55″E
- Country: France
- Region: Occitania
- Department: Gard
- Arrondissement: Alès
- Canton: Rousson

Government
  - Mayor (2020–2026): Jean-Pierre de Faria
- Area^{1}: 11.74 km^{2} (4.53 sq mi)
- Elevation: 151 m (495 ft)
- Highest elevation: 485 m (1,591 ft)
- Lowest elevation: 118 m (387 ft)
- Population (2023): 3,445
  - Density: 293.4/km^{2} (760.0/sq mi)
- Time zone: UTC+01:00 (CET)
  - Summer (DST): UTC+02:00 (CEST)
- INSEE/Postal code: 30227 /30500
- ^{1} French Land Register data, which excludes lakes, ponds, glaciers > 1 km^{2} (0.386 sq mi or 247 acres) and river estuaries.

Saint-Ambroix (French pronunciation: [sɛ̃.t‿ɑ̃bʁwa]; Occitan: Sant Ambruèis) is a commune in the Gard department in southern France.

== Population ==
Historical population

Year	Pop.	±% p.a.
1793	2,300	—
1800	2,258	−0.26%
1806	2,102	−1.19%
1821	2,531	+1.25%
1831	2,947	+1.53%
1836	3,107	+1.06%
1841	3,148	+0.26%
1846	3,650	+3.00%
1851	3,724	+0.40%
1856	4,260	+2.73%
1861	4,060	−0.96%
1866	4,645	+2.73%
1872	4,260	−1.43%
1876	4,012	−1.49%
1881	3,454	−2.95%
1886	3,433	−0.12%
1891	3,380	−0.31%
1896	3,307	−0.44%
1901	3,585	+1.63%

Year	Pop.	±% p.a.
1906	3,631	+0.26%
1911	3,494	−0.77%
1921	3,549	+0.16%
1926	3,558	+0.05%
1931	3,350	−1.20%
1936	3,317	−0.20%
1946	3,301	−0.05%
1954	3,627	+1.18%
1962	3,731	+0.35%
1968	4,164	+1.85%
1975	3,815	−1.24%
1982	3,845	+0.11%
1990	3,517	−1.11%
1999	3,365	−0.49%
2007	3,509	+0.53%
2012	3,319	−1.11%
2017	3,162	−0.96%
2023	3,445	+1.44%

Source: EHESS and INSEE (1968-2023)

== See also ==
- Communes of the Gard department
