= Le Martinet =

- Commune
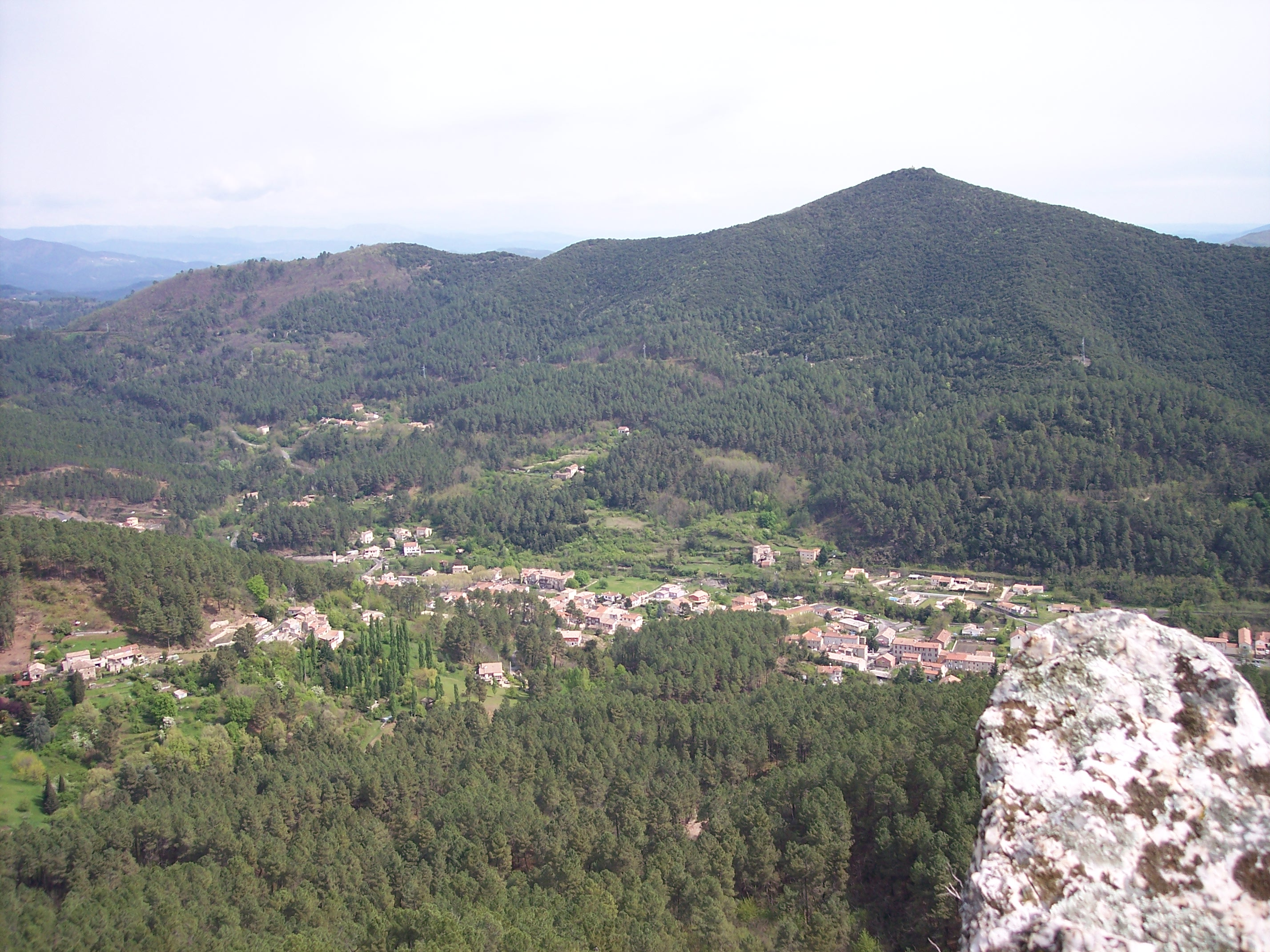
- A general view of Le Martinet

- Coat of arms
- Location of Le Martinet
- Location within France Location within Occitanie
- Coordinates: 44°15′14″N 4°05′09″E
- Country: France
- Region: Occitania
- Department: Gard
- Arrondissement: Alès
- Canton: Rousson
- Intercommunality: Alès Agglomération

Government
  - Mayor (2020–2026): Michel Mercier (PCF)
- Area^{1}: 10.35 km^{2} (4.00 sq mi)
- Elevation: 152 m (499 ft)
- Highest elevation: 692 m (2,270 ft)
- Lowest elevation: 234 m (768 ft)
- Population (2023): 719
  - Density: 69.5/km^{2} (180/sq mi)
- Time zone: UTC+01:00 (CET)
  - Summer (DST): UTC+02:00 (CEST)
- INSEE/Postal code: 30159 /30960
- ^{1} French Land Register data, which excludes lakes, ponds, glaciers > 1 km^{2} (0.386 sq mi or 247 acres) and river estuaries.

Le Martinet (French pronunciation: [lə maʁtinɛ]; Occitan: Lo Martinet) is a commune in the Gard department in southern France.

== Population ==
Historical population
Year	Pop.	±% p.a.
1968	1,705	—
1975	1,300	−3.80%
1982	953	−4.34%
1990	844	−1.51%
1999	764	−1.10%
2007	793	+0.47%
2012	840	+1.16%
2017	750	−2.24%
2023	719	−0.70%
Source: INSEE

== See also ==
- Communes of the Gard department
