= Robiac-Rochessadoule =

- Commune
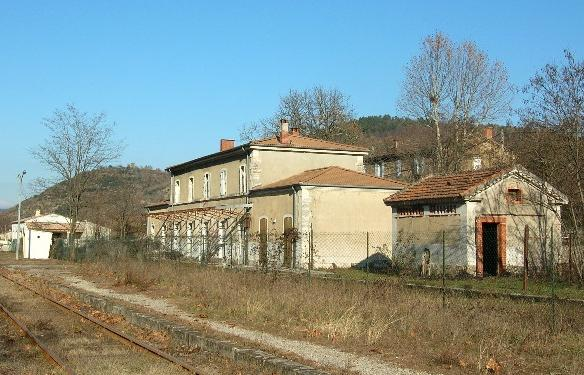
- Train station

- Coat of arms
- Location of Robiac-Rochessadoule
- Location within France Location within Occitanie
- Coordinates: 44°16′38″N 4°07′30″E
- Country: France
- Region: Occitania
- Department: Gard
- Arrondissement: Alès
- Canton: Rousson

Government
  - Mayor (2020–2026): Henri Chalvidan
- Area^{1}: 10.31 km^{2} (3.98 sq mi)
- Elevation: 150 m (490 ft)
- Highest elevation: 628 m (2,060 ft)
- Lowest elevation: 147 m (482 ft)
- Population (2023): 832
  - Density: 80.7/km^{2} (209/sq mi)
- Time zone: UTC+01:00 (CET)
  - Summer (DST): UTC+02:00 (CEST)
- INSEE/Postal code: 30216 /30160
- ^{1} French Land Register data, which excludes lakes, ponds, glaciers > 1 km^{2} (0.386 sq mi or 247 acres) and river estuaries.

Robiac-Rochessadoule (French pronunciation: [ʁɔbjak ʁɔʃsadul]; Occitan: Robiac e Ròca-sadola) is a commune in the Gard department in southern France.

== Population ==
Historical population
Year	Pop.	±% p.a.
1968	1,456	—
1975	1,045	−4.63%
1982	981	−0.90%
1990	808	−2.40%
1999	793	−0.21%
2007	806	+0.20%
2012	905	+2.34%
2017	840	−1.48%
2023	832	−0.16%
Source: INSEE

== See also ==
- Communes of the Gard department
