= La Grand-Combe =

La Grand-Combe La Grand Comba (Occitan)
- Commune
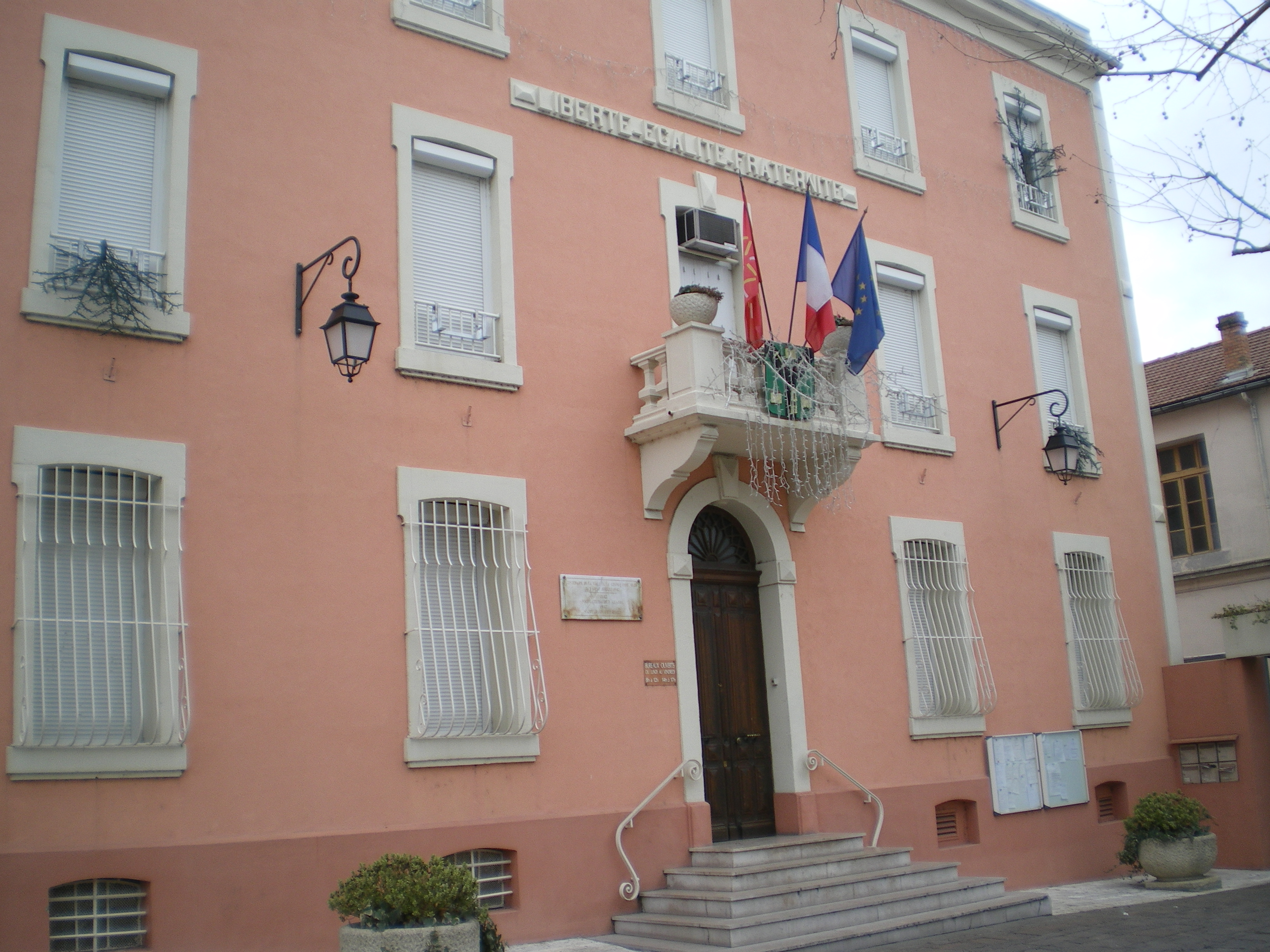
- Town hall

- Coat of arms
- Location of La Grand-Combe
- Location within France Location within Occitanie
- Coordinates: 44°12′40″N 4°01′46″E
- Country: France
- Region: Occitania
- Department: Gard
- Arrondissement: Alès
- Canton: La Grand-Combe
- Intercommunality: Alès Agglomération

Government
  - Mayor (2023–2026): Laurence Baldit
- Area^{1}: 12.01 km^{2} (4.64 sq mi)
- Elevation: 188 m (617 ft)
- Highest elevation: 623 m (2,044 ft)
- Lowest elevation: 169 m (554 ft)
- Population (2023): 4,783
  - Density: 398.3/km^{2} (1,031/sq mi)
- Demonym: Grand-Combiens
- Time zone: UTC+01:00 (CET)
  - Summer (DST): UTC+02:00 (CEST)
- INSEE/Postal code: 30132 /30110
- Website: www.lagrandcombe.fr
- ^{1} French Land Register data, which excludes lakes, ponds, glaciers > 1 km^{2} (0.386 sq mi or 247 acres) and river estuaries.

La Grand-Combe (French pronunciation: [la ɡʁɑ̃ kɔ̃b]; Occitan: La Grand Comba) is a commune in the Gard department in southern France.

== Geography ==
The town lies on the opposite bank of the river Gardon d'Alès from Les Salles-du-Gardon. It is 13 km upstream and north of Alès in the Cévennes of Gard.

=== Climate ===
La Grand-Combe has a hot-summer Mediterranean climate (Köppen climate classification Csa). The average annual temperature in La Grand-Combe is 13.7 °C (56.7 °F). The average annual rainfall is 1,414.0 mm (55.67 in) with November as the wettest month. The temperatures are highest on average in July, at around 23.2 °C (73.8 °F), and lowest in January, at around 5.7 °C (42.3 °F). The highest temperature ever recorded in La Grand-Combe was 40.2 °C (104.4 °F) on 28 June 2019; the coldest temperature ever recorded was −10.1 °C (13.8 °F) on 5 February 2012.

Climate data for La Grand-Combe (1991−2020 normals, extremes 2002−present)
Month	Jan	Feb	Mar	Apr	May	Jun	Jul	Aug	Sep	Oct	Nov	Dec	Year
Record high °C (°F)	19.8 (67.6)	21.0 (69.8)	24.5 (76.1)	28.3 (82.9)	30.9 (87.6)	40.2 (104.4)	36.7 (98.1)	38.6 (101.5)	34.3 (93.7)	30.2 (86.4)	23.0 (73.4)	18.6 (65.5)	40.2 (104.4)
Mean daily maximum °C (°F)	8.8 (47.8)	9.5 (49.1)	13.5 (56.3)	17.0 (62.6)	20.7 (69.3)	26.0 (78.8)	29.0 (84.2)	28.2 (82.8)	23.4 (74.1)	17.7 (63.9)	12.6 (54.7)	9.7 (49.5)	18.0 (64.4)
Daily mean °C (°F)	5.7 (42.3)	6.0 (42.8)	9.3 (48.7)	12.5 (54.5)	15.9 (60.6)	20.6 (69.1)	23.2 (73.8)	22.6 (72.7)	18.6 (65.5)	14.1 (57.4)	9.6 (49.3)	6.7 (44.1)	13.7 (56.7)
Mean daily minimum °C (°F)	2.6 (36.7)	2.4 (36.3)	5.0 (41.0)	8.0 (46.4)	11.1 (52.0)	15.2 (59.4)	17.3 (63.1)	16.9 (62.4)	13.8 (56.8)	10.5 (50.9)	6.6 (43.9)	3.6 (38.5)	9.4 (48.9)
Record low °C (°F)	−7.2 (19.0)	−10.1 (13.8)	−9.3 (15.3)	−0.9 (30.4)	2.7 (36.9)	8.4 (47.1)	10.0 (50.0)	8.8 (47.8)	6.7 (44.1)	0.1 (32.2)	−4.2 (24.4)	−7.7 (18.1)	−10.1 (13.8)
Average precipitation mm (inches)	101.2 (3.98)	96.9 (3.81)	102.8 (4.05)	124.3 (4.89)	108.6 (4.28)	56.5 (2.22)	38.4 (1.51)	65.4 (2.57)	133.7 (5.26)	224.4 (8.83)	243.0 (9.57)	118.8 (4.68)	1,414 (55.67)
Average precipitation days (≥ 1.0 mm)	8.1	6.4	6.4	8.6	7.5	5.7	4.3	5.1	5.0	9.6	10.0	8.2	85.0
Source: Météo-France

== Etymology ==
In French "combe" is a feminine noun derived from the Celtic noun cumba meaning valley. The feminine form of the adjective grand would suggest the use of a final "e", but here it uses the archaic form derived directly from Latin- this can also be found in the spelling of "grand-mère", and "grand-rue" and in the place name La Grand-Croix (Loire), Grand was the traditional spelling but the "e" was added to modern French in an attempt to harmonise the treatment of all adjectives. The name of the town took the spelling of la Grand’Combe but this has now been changed to la Grand-Combe.

== History ==
The town grew out of the Industrial Revolution, The commune was created in 1846 and was carved out of the communes de Laval, Portes, Sainte-Cécile-d'Andorge, and Les Salles-du-Gardon. It became the seat of the canton 12 years later in 1858. During the Middle Ages, the valley was one of the cradles of the Cévennes coal industry, but it really was not until around 1780 on the initiative of Pierre-François Tubeuf that industrial mining techniques were used. Shafts were sunk, and the galleries were supported with wooden pit-props.

The Compagnie des Mines de la Grand’Combe et des chemins de fer du Gard was formed in 1836 by Paulin Talabot (1799–1885). By 1841, the Cévennes line had been built through la Grand-Combe and Alès. The line was extended to Brioude via Chamborigaud in 1867.

The company was successful providing coal for the French Navy and Merchant Marine and adopted the trademark of an anchor. Domestic coal was also shipped to Marseille.

This was very much a company town, and the workers were provided for from birth to death with good wages, free accommodation, heating, education, a Catholic church (1856 to 1864) and a chapel (1868) at Trescol for the Protestants.

After 1918, the town tended to elect mayors who were independent of the company. These were in the main socialist, or more recently communist. Though strikes were frequent, the company produced just under 1 million tonnes of coal annually. Coal was nationalised in 1946, and the merged companies modernised the more profitable mines. The Houillères du bassin des Cévennes had its peak year in 1958, when 20,000 workers mined 3.3 million tonnes of coal. In 1960, the town had 17,000 inhabitants, and numerous modern subsidized housing units and apartments were constructed, especially in Trescol. Today, Trescol has assisted area status(ZUS) because of its high unemployment rate.

The mines closed in the 1960s and the 1970s. In 1968, Rochebelle, in Alès, closed, and in 1978, the Richard and Destival mines. followed Finally, in 1984, the Oules mine closed and so by 1985, there was no coal being mined in the Cévennes. The Richard mine was classified a historic monument on 14 May 2008. The town's population fell to 5187, and unemployment remains at 40%.

== Population ==
Historical population

Year	Pop.	±% p.a.
1846	4,011	—
1851	4,730	+3.35%
1856	6,315	+5.95%
1861	7,780	+4.26%
1866	9,362	+3.77%
1872	8,872	−0.89%
1876	10,152	+3.43%
1881	12,138	+3.64%
1886	11,341	−1.35%
1891	13,141	+2.99%
1896	13,358	+0.33%
1901	11,484	−2.98%
1906	11,292	−0.34%
1911	11,547	+0.45%
1921	11,232	−0.28%

Year	Pop.	±% p.a.
1926	12,378	+1.96%
1931	12,116	−0.43%
1936	12,343	+0.37%
1946	14,165	+1.39%
1954	14,565	+0.35%
1962	14,440	−0.11%
1968	13,240	−1.44%
1975	10,452	−3.32%
1982	8,329	−3.19%
1990	7,107	−1.96%
1999	5,800	−2.23%
2007	5,266	−1.20%
2012	5,229	−0.14%
2017	5,041	−0.73%
2023	4,783	−0.87%

Source: EHESS and INSEE (1968-2023)

== See also ==
- Communes of the Gard department
