= Sainte-Cécile-d'Andorge =

- Commune
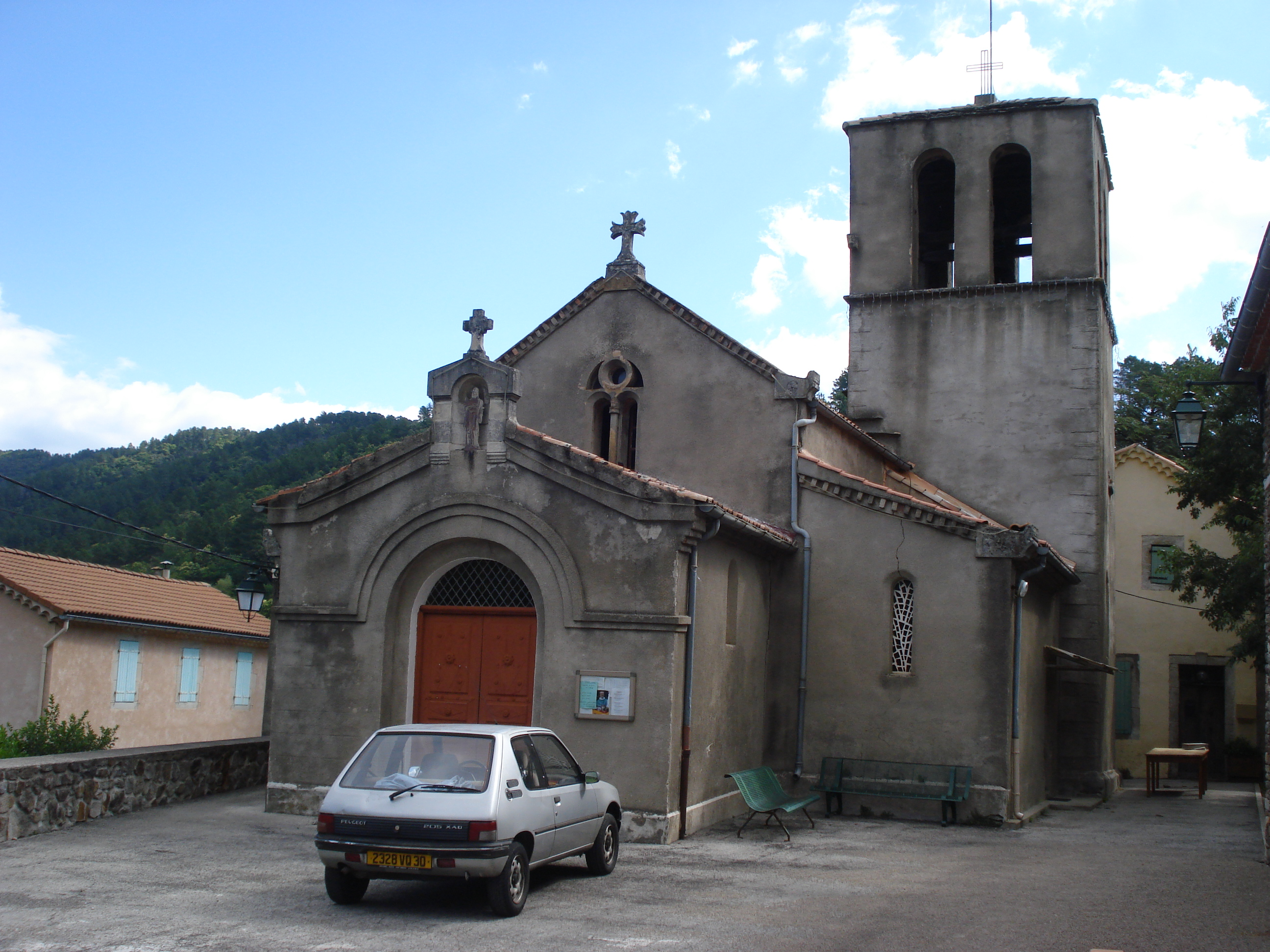
- The church of Sainte-Cécile-d'Andorge

- Coat of arms
- Location of Sainte-Cécile-d'Andorge
- Location within France Location within Occitanie
- Coordinates: 44°15′10″N 3°58′37″E
- Country: France
- Region: Occitania
- Department: Gard
- Arrondissement: Alès
- Canton: La Grand-Combe
- Intercommunality: Alès Agglomération

Government
  - Mayor (2020–2026): Jacques Pepin
- Area^{1}: 19.09 km^{2} (7.37 sq mi)
- Elevation: 291 m (955 ft)
- Highest elevation: 835 m (2,740 ft)
- Lowest elevation: 200 m (660 ft)
- Population (2023): 525
  - Density: 27.5/km^{2} (71.2/sq mi)
- Time zone: UTC+01:00 (CET)
  - Summer (DST): UTC+02:00 (CEST)
- INSEE/Postal code: 30239 /30110
- ^{1} French Land Register data, which excludes lakes, ponds, glaciers > 1 km^{2} (0.386 sq mi or 247 acres) and river estuaries.

Sainte-Cécile-d'Andorge (French pronunciation: [sɛ̃t sesil dɑ̃dɔʁʒ]; Occitan: Senta Cecília d'Andòrge) is a commune in the Gard department in southern France.

== Geography ==
The commune or Sainte Cécile d'Andorge is sparsely populated. It lies at the extreme north of the department of Gard, forming part of the border with Lozère. Its river, the Andorge here joins the larger Gardon d'Alès (sometimes known as the Long Valley) whose sources lie further up the valley in Lozère. The waters flow through this long cevenol valley through the former mining village of la Grand-Combe and down to the flatter land at Alès.

== Population ==
Historical population
Year	Pop.	±% p.a.
1968	620	—
1975	499	−3.05%
1982	476	−0.67%
1990	483	+0.18%
1999	490	+0.16%
2007	558	+1.64%
2012	556	−0.07%
2017	586	+1.06%
2023	525	−1.82%
Source: INSEE

== Coal ==
This was a coal mining area, with important collieries of high-grade coal both in this valley and at Portes. These mines closed in 1973.

== Railroads ==
Sainte-Cécile-d'Andorge has a railway station on the line from Nîmes to Clermont-Ferrand. The metric line to Florac was closed in the 1960s.

== Dams ==
The waters of the Gardon d'Alès have been tamed by two dams forming two reservoirs. The first, the Barrage de Camboix, was a hydro-electric scheme designed to supplement the power for the coal mines at Grand-Combe, and the second, the barrage de Sainte Cécile, was designed as a holding reservoir to control the violent 'crue' the area suffers when violent storms in the hills send an uncontrolled surge of water down the river flooding low-lying houses and agricultural land.

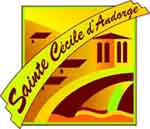
Logo municipal

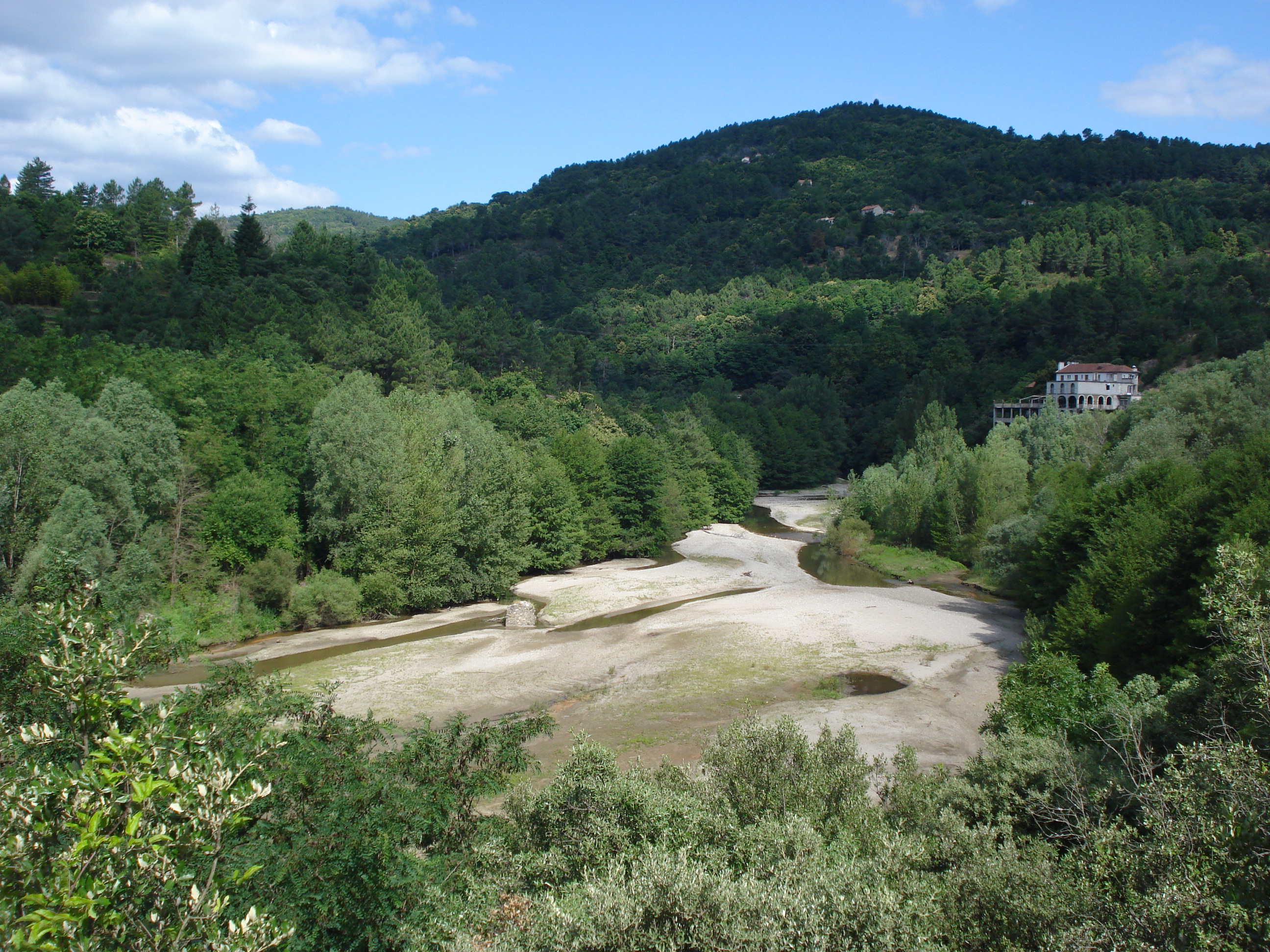
Gardon d'Alès near the village of Sainte-Cécile-d'Andorge

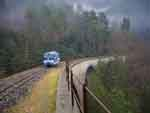
Viaduc sur l'Andorge on the TAC

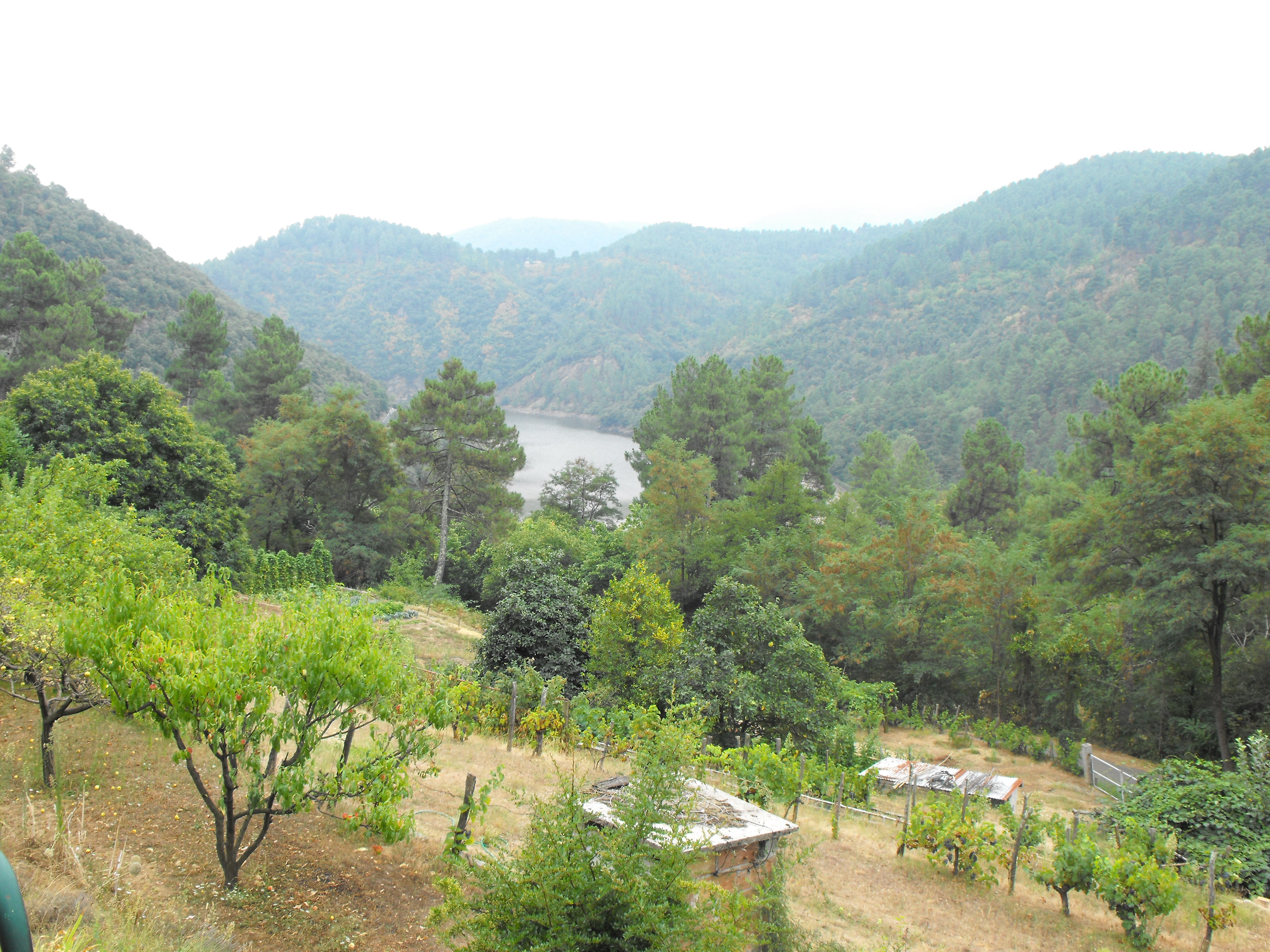
Le lake de Sainte Cécile d'Andorge

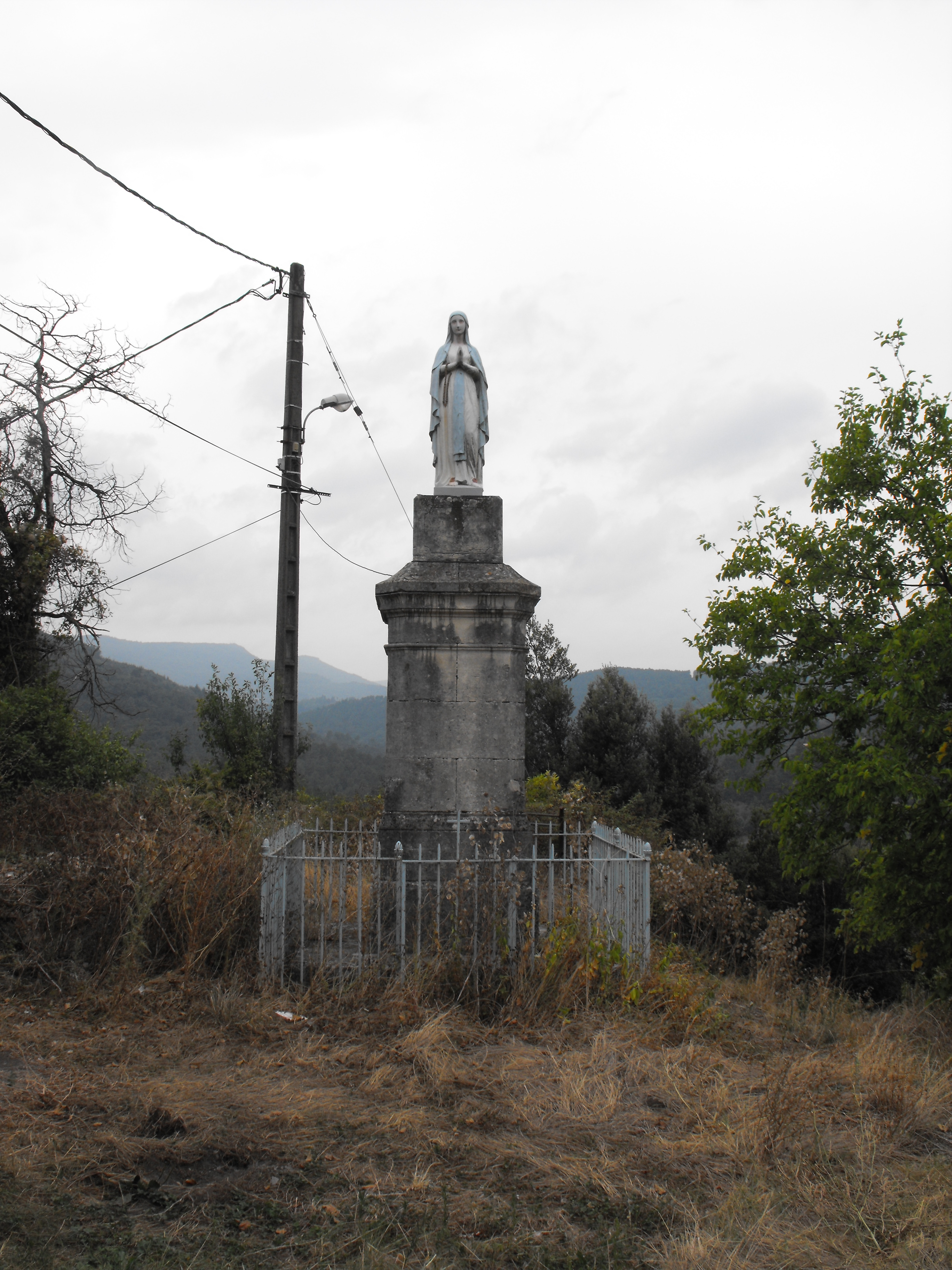
The statue of Our Lady

== History ==
The commune of Sainte-Cécile-d'Andorge has a long history. There are some prehistoric remains to be found such as tumuli and some paintings mainly in the hamlet of Ponchets. The current houses date from the 18th century and have been protected from modern development. They are mostly built from the local stone (schist).

Unusually for a village in the fiercely Protestant Cévennes, Sainte-Cécile remained Catholic. During the Guerre des Camisards (1702–1705), it was the scene of violent action. On 11 October 1703 the villages of Sainte-Cécile-d'Andorge and Saint-Julien-des-Points were set alight by Rolland et Jouanny; 800 to 900 Camisard attacked the papist village of Sainte-Cécile-d'Andorge, enraged by the dévastation of the previous months in the Hautes Cévennes. The residents took refuge in their fortified church but 9 were too slow and were slaughtered. Several days later, Abbé Vidal, curé de Sainte-Cécile, lead a revenge attack on the neighbouring reformed parish of Blannaves. The church tower dates from the 13th century.

== The railways ==
The principal rail line, part of the PLM Transcévenol, threads its way along the Gardon valley from Alès to Génolhac to Mende, this section of the line was approved in 1861 and opened 5 May 1870, and provided the link between Languedoc, Alès and Issoire and Paris. It hosted three express trains. There is still a twice daily local service. From the station at Sainte-Cécile-d'Andorge there is a 1-metre gauge railway to Florac. It is 49 km long. This is known as the TAC. Authorised in 1859, the line was built by the Chemins de Fer Départementaux to bring wooden pit props down to Alés, with some passenger traffic. This amounted to two trains a day. The track is very winding, and climbs to 1024 m to cross the Col de Jalcreste. It closed in 1968. Enthuiasts are restoring it. They run a passenger pulling diesel locomotive on the first section, which includes the Viaduct d'Andorge. Between 1859 and 1867 there was a gravity driven rail line from the mainline at Le Levade, La Grand-Combe to Portes et Sénéchas. This was to serve the mines at La Vernarède. The full wagons descending to the river pulled up the empty wagons by a system of cables. It was the idea of the engineer Paul-Adrien Bourdaloue.

== See also ==
- Communes of the Gard department
