= Giraudo =

Giraudo is an Italian surname. Notable people with the surname include:

- Alberto Giraudo (born 1983), Italian tennis coach and player
- David Giraudo (born 1970), French footballer
- Federico Giraudo (born 1998), Italian footballer
- John C. Giraudo (1923–1996), United States Air Force major
- Raoul Giraudo (1932–1995), French footballer
