= Thoiras =

Commune in Gard, France

- Part of Thoiras-Corbès
- Coat of arms
- Location of Thoiras
- Location within France Location within Occitanie
- Coordinates: 44°03′58″N 3°55′42″E
- Country: France
- Region: Occitania
- Department: Gard
- Arrondissement: Alès
- Canton: La Grand-Combe
- Commune: Thoiras-Corbès
- Area^{1}: 22.89 km^{2} (8.84 sq mi)
- Elevation: 169 m (554 ft)
- Highest elevation: 503 m (1,650 ft)
- Lowest elevation: 139 m (456 ft)
- Population (2023): 444
  - Density: 19.4/km^{2} (50.2/sq mi)
- Time zone: UTC+01:00 (CET)
  - Summer (DST): UTC+02:00 (CEST)
- Postal code: 30140
- ^{1} French Land Register data, which excludes lakes, ponds, glaciers > 1 km^{2} (0.386 sq mi or 247 acres) and river estuaries.

Thoiras (French pronunciation: [twaʁas]; Occitan: Toiraç) is a former commune in the Gard department in southern France. It was merged with Corbès to form Thoiras-Corbès on 1 January 2025.

== See also ==
- Communes of the Gard department
