= Corbès =

Commune in Gard, France

- Part of Thoiras-Corbès
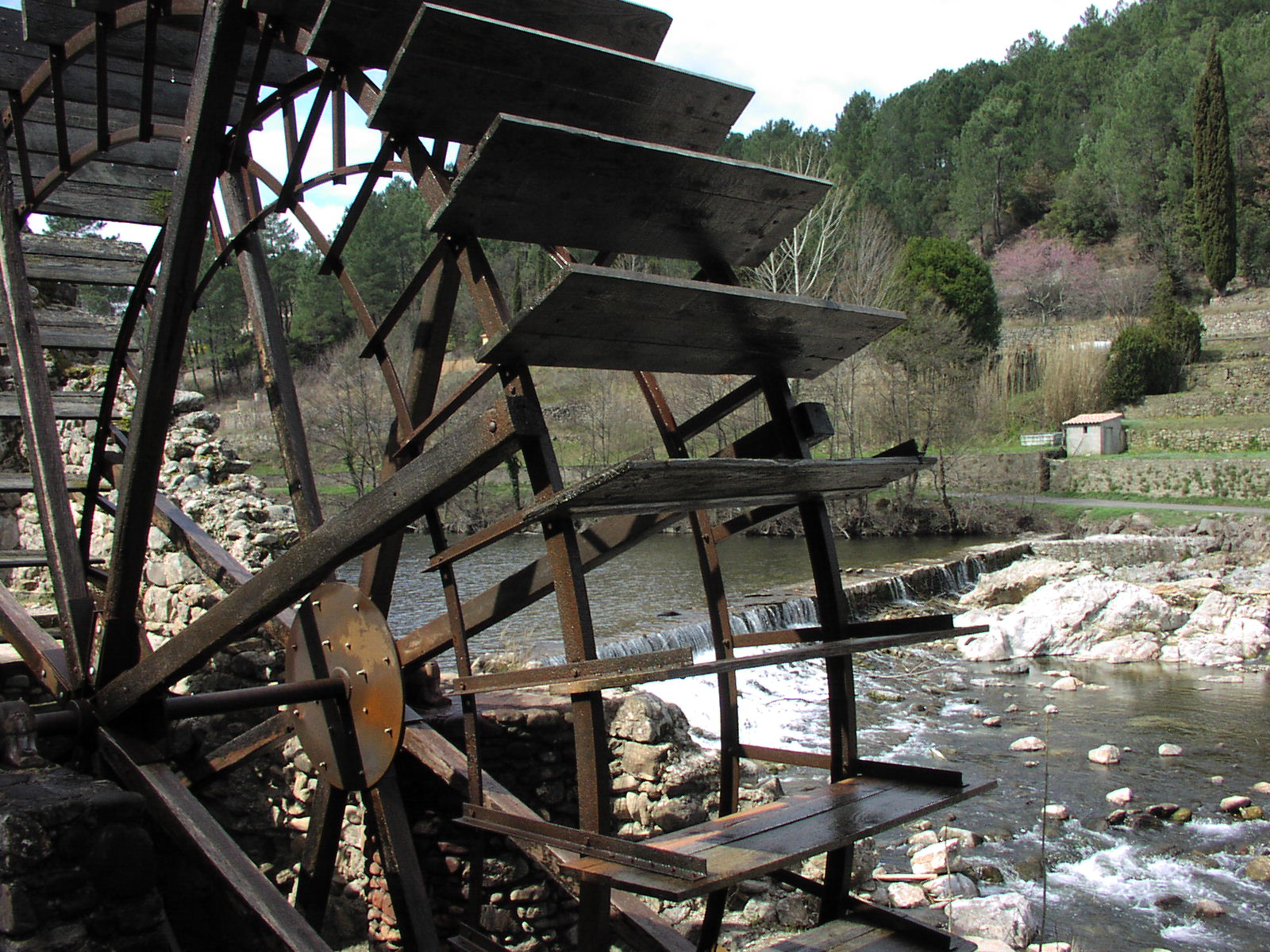
- The Gardon river, by the wheel of the mill, at Corbes

- Coat of arms
- Location of Corbès
- Location within France Location within Occitanie
- Coordinates: 44°04′37″N 3°57′18″E
- Country: France
- Region: Occitania
- Department: Gard
- Arrondissement: Alès
- Canton: La Grand-Combe
- Commune: Thoiras-Corbès
- Area^{1}: 3.28 km^{2} (1.27 sq mi)
- Elevation: 200 m (660 ft)
- Highest elevation: 382 m (1,253 ft)
- Lowest elevation: 131 m (430 ft)
- Population (2022): 156
  - Density: 47.6/km^{2} (123/sq mi)
- Time zone: UTC+01:00 (CET)
  - Summer (DST): UTC+02:00 (CEST)
- Postal code: 30140
- ^{1} French Land Register data, which excludes lakes, ponds, glaciers > 1 km^{2} (0.386 sq mi or 247 acres) and river estuaries.

Corbès (French pronunciation: [kɔʁbɛs]; Occitan: Corbés) is a former commune in the Gard department in southern France. It was merged with Thoiras to form Thoiras-Corbès on 1 January 2025.

== Population ==
Historical population
Year	Pop.	±% p.a.
1968	47	—
1975	61	+3.79%
1982	92	+6.05%
1990	113	+2.60%
1999	127	+1.31%
2009	150	+1.68%
2014	166	+2.05%
2020	150	−1.68%
Source: INSEE

== See also ==
- Communes of the Gard department
