= Saint-Paul-la-Coste =

- Commune
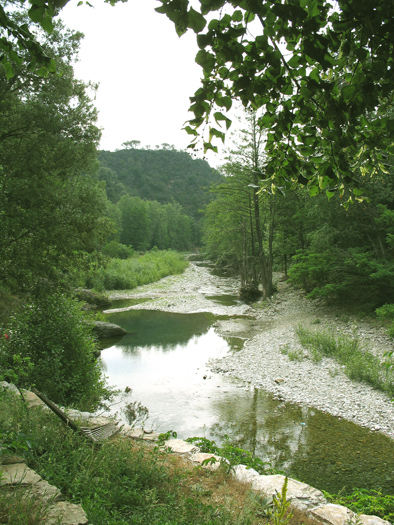
- The Galeizon river

- Coat of arms
- Location of Saint-Paul-la-Coste
- Location within France Location within Occitanie
- Coordinates: 44°09′02″N 3°58′13″E
- Country: France
- Region: Occitania
- Department: Gard
- Arrondissement: Alès
- Canton: La Grand-Combe
- Intercommunality: Alès Agglomération

Government
  - Mayor (2020–2026): Adrien Chapon
- Area^{1}: 18.95 km^{2} (7.32 sq mi)
- Elevation: 650 m (2,130 ft)
- Highest elevation: 680 m (2,230 ft)
- Lowest elevation: 168 m (551 ft)
- Population (2023): 324
  - Density: 17.1/km^{2} (44.3/sq mi)
- Time zone: UTC+01:00 (CET)
  - Summer (DST): UTC+02:00 (CEST)
- INSEE/Postal code: 30291 /30480
- ^{1} French Land Register data, which excludes lakes, ponds, glaciers > 1 km^{2} (0.386 sq mi or 247 acres) and river estuaries.

Saint-Paul-la-Coste (French pronunciation: [sɛ̃ pɔl la kɔst]; Occitan: Sent Pau de la Còsta) is a commune in the Gard department in southern France.

== Population ==
Historical population
Year	Pop.	±% p.a.
1968	184	—
1975	194	+0.76%
1982	172	−1.70%
1990	193	+1.45%
1999	220	+1.47%
2007	264	+2.31%
2012	298	+2.45%
2017	285	−0.89%
2023	324	+2.16%
Source: INSEE

== See also ==
- Communes of the Gard department
