= Aujac, Gard =

Commune in Occitanie, France

Aujac
- Commune
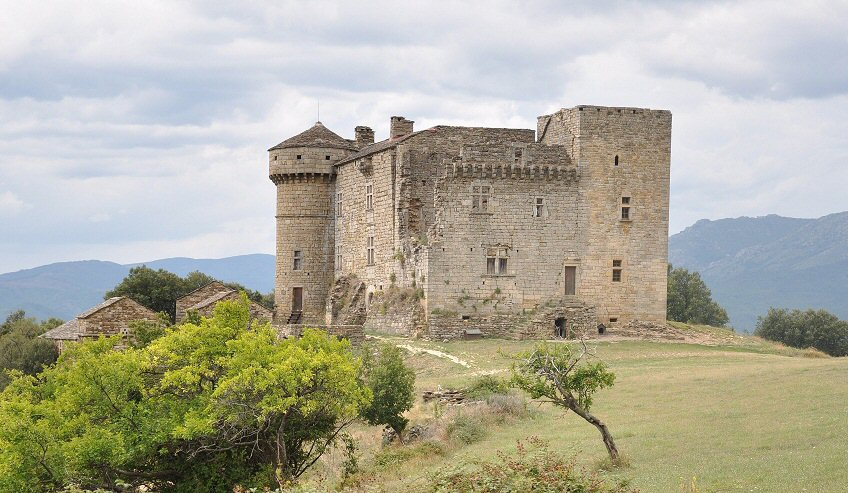
- The Chateau du Cheylard in Aujac

- Coat of arms
- Location of Aujac
- Location within France Location within Occitanie
- Coordinates: 44°21′00″N 4°00′54″E
- Country: France
- Region: Occitania
- Department: Gard
- Arrondissement: Alès
- Canton: La Grand-Combe
- Intercommunality: Alès Agglomération

Government
  - Mayor (2022–2026): Patrick Larmagnat
- Area^{1}: 16.47 km^{2} (6.36 sq mi)
- Elevation: 500 m (1,600 ft)
- Highest elevation: 940 m (3,080 ft)
- Lowest elevation: 256 m (840 ft)
- Population (2023): 147
  - Density: 8.93/km^{2} (23.1/sq mi)
- Time zone: UTC+01:00 (CET)
  - Summer (DST): UTC+02:00 (CEST)
- INSEE/Postal code: 30022 /30450
- ^{1} French Land Register data, which excludes lakes, ponds, glaciers > 1 km^{2} (0.386 sq mi or 247 acres) and river estuaries.

Aujac (French pronunciation: [oʒak]) is a commune in the Gard department in southern France.

== Population ==
Historical population
Year	Pop.	±% p.a.
1968	158	—
1975	135	−2.22%
1982	148	+1.32%
1990	154	+0.50%
1999	166	+0.84%
2007	179	+0.95%
2012	184	+0.55%
2017	178	−0.66%
2023	147	−3.14%
Source: INSEE

== See also ==
- Communes of the Gard department
