= Thoiras-Corbès =

- Commune
- Coat of arms
- Location of Thoiras-Corbès
- Location within France Location within Occitanie
- Coordinates: 44°03′58″N 3°55′42″E
- Country: France
- Region: Occitania
- Department: Gard
- Arrondissement: Alès
- Canton: La Grand-Combe
- Intercommunality: Alès Agglomération

Government
  - Mayor (2025–2026): Lionel Andre
- Area^{1}: 26.17 km^{2} (10.10 sq mi)
- Highest elevation: 503 m (1,650 ft)
- Lowest elevation: 131 m (430 ft)
- Population (2023): 607
  - Density: 23.2/km^{2} (60.1/sq mi)
- Time zone: UTC+01:00 (CET)
  - Summer (DST): UTC+02:00 (CEST)
- INSEE/Postal code: 30329 /30140
- ^{1} French Land Register data, which excludes lakes, ponds, glaciers > 1 km^{2} (0.386 sq mi or 247 acres) and river estuaries.

Thoiras-Corbès (French pronunciation: [twaʁas kɔʁbɛs]) is a commune in the Gard department in southern France. It was formed on 1 January 2025, with the merger of Thoiras and Corbès.

== See also ==
- Communes of the Gard department
