= Cendras =

Commune in Occitanie, France

- Commune
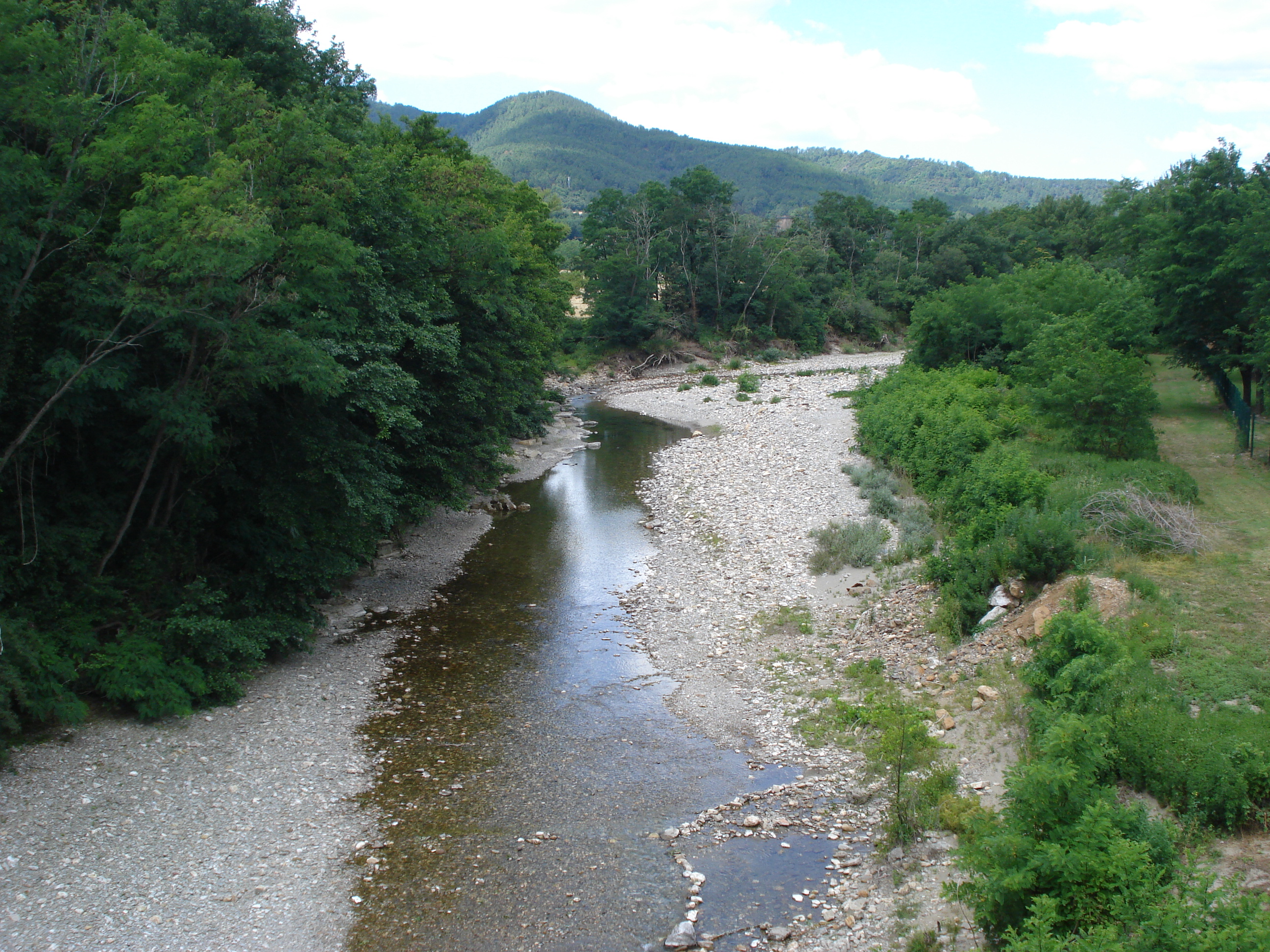
- The Galeizon river in Cendras

- Coat of arms
- Location of Cendras
- Location within France Location within Occitanie
- Coordinates: 44°09′22″N 4°03′16″E
- Country: France
- Region: Occitania
- Department: Gard
- Arrondissement: Alès
- Canton: La Grand-Combe
- Intercommunality: Alès Agglomération

Government
  - Mayor (2020–2026): Sylvain Andre
- Area^{1}: 12.86 km^{2} (4.97 sq mi)
- Elevation: 140 m (460 ft)
- Highest elevation: 560 m (1,840 ft)
- Lowest elevation: 138 m (453 ft)
- Population (2023): 1,599
  - Density: 124.3/km^{2} (322.0/sq mi)
- Time zone: UTC+01:00 (CET)
  - Summer (DST): UTC+02:00 (CEST)
- INSEE/Postal code: 30077 /30480
- ^{1} French Land Register data, which excludes lakes, ponds, glaciers > 1 km^{2} (0.386 sq mi or 247 acres) and river estuaries.

Cendras (French pronunciation: [sɑ̃dʁas]; Occitan: Cendrats) is a commune in the Gard department in southern France.

== Population ==
Historical population
Year	Pop.	±% p.a.
1968	2,781	—
1975	2,267	−2.88%
1982	2,140	−0.82%
1990	2,022	−0.71%
1999	1,952	−0.39%
2007	1,962	+0.06%
2012	1,941	−0.21%
2017	1,841	−1.05%
2023	1,599	−2.32%
Source: INSEE

== See also ==
- Communes of the Gard department
