= Saint-Bonnet-de-Salendrinque =

- Commune
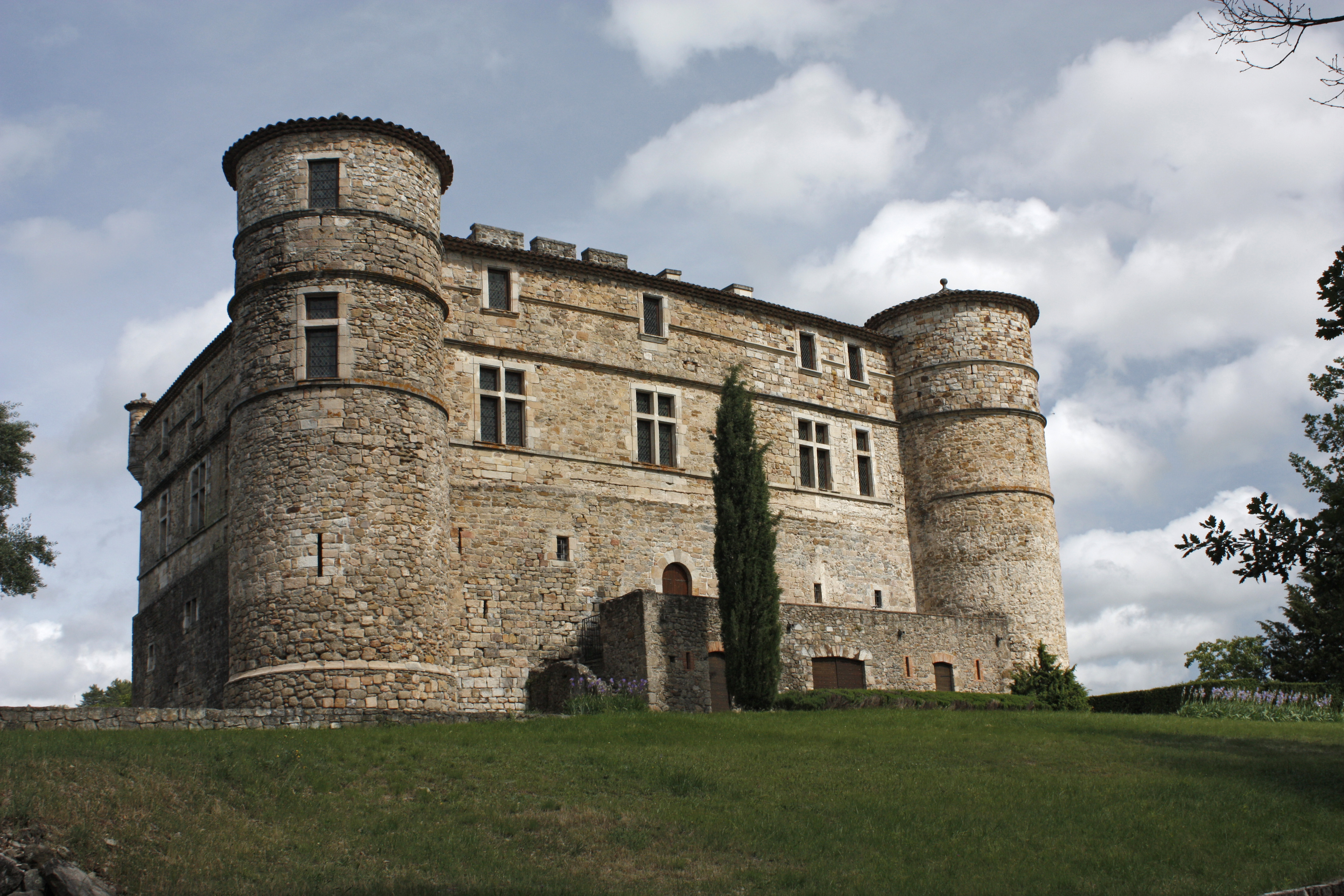
- Le Castellas

- Coat of arms
- Location of Saint-Bonnet-de-Salendrinque
- Location within France Location within Occitanie
- Coordinates: 44°02′18″N 3°52′10″E
- Country: France
- Region: Occitania
- Department: Gard
- Arrondissement: Alès
- Canton: La Grand-Combe
- Intercommunality: Alès Agglomération

Government
  - Mayor (2020–2026): Sébastien Magny
- Area^{1}: 3.59 km^{2} (1.39 sq mi)
- Elevation: 400 m (1,300 ft)
- Highest elevation: 460 m (1,510 ft)
- Lowest elevation: 208 m (682 ft)
- Population (2023): 129
  - Density: 35.9/km^{2} (93.1/sq mi)
- Time zone: UTC+01:00 (CET)
  - Summer (DST): UTC+02:00 (CEST)
- INSEE/Postal code: 30236 /30460
- ^{1} French Land Register data, which excludes lakes, ponds, glaciers > 1 km^{2} (0.386 sq mi or 247 acres) and river estuaries.

Saint-Bonnet-de-Salendrinque (Occitan: Sent Bonet de Salendrenca, before 1962: Saint-Bonnet) is a commune in the Gard department in southern France.

== Population ==
Historical population
Year	Pop.	±% p.a.
1968	74	—
1975	44	−7.16%
1982	53	+2.69%
1990	79	+5.12%
1999	75	−0.58%
2007	94	+2.86%
2012	108	+2.82%
2017	120	+2.13%
2023	129	+1.21%
Source: INSEE

== See also ==
- Communes of the Gard department
