= Bonnevaux, Gard =

Commune in Occitanie, France

Bonnevaux
- Commune
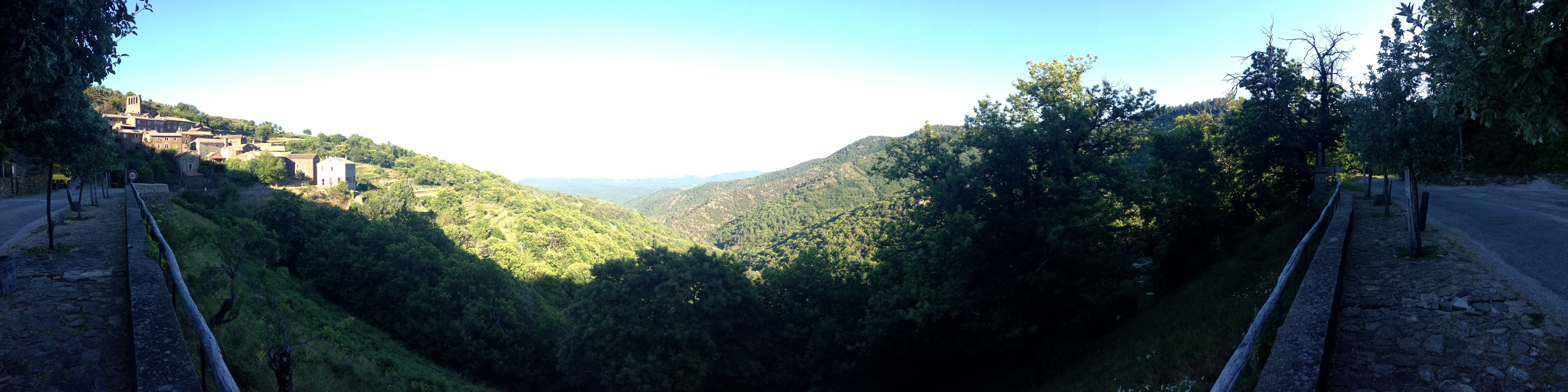
- A panorama of Bonnevaux

- Coat of arms
- Location of Bonnevaux
- Location within France Location within Occitanie
- Coordinates: 44°22′06″N 4°01′55″E
- Country: France
- Region: Occitania
- Department: Gard
- Arrondissement: Alès
- Canton: La Grand-Combe
- Intercommunality: Alès Agglomération

Government
  - Mayor (2020–2026): Roseline Boussac
- Area^{1}: 8.81 km^{2} (3.40 sq mi)
- Elevation: 650 m (2,130 ft)
- Highest elevation: 976 m (3,202 ft)
- Lowest elevation: 360 m (1,180 ft)
- Population (2023): 78
  - Density: 8.9/km^{2} (23/sq mi)
- Time zone: UTC+01:00 (CET)
  - Summer (DST): UTC+02:00 (CEST)
- INSEE/Postal code: 30044 /30450
- ^{1} French Land Register data, which excludes lakes, ponds, glaciers > 1 km^{2} (0.386 sq mi or 247 acres) and river estuaries.

Bonnevaux (French pronunciation: [bɔnvo]; Occitan: Bònavau) is a commune in the Gard department in southern France.

== Population ==
Historical population
Year	Pop.	±% p.a.
1968	32	—
1975	30	−0.92%
1982	51	+7.88%
1990	61	+2.26%
1999	102	+5.88%
2007	94	−1.02%
2012	105	+2.24%
2017	88	−3.47%
2023	78	−1.99%
Source: INSEE

== See also ==
- Communes of the Gard department
