= Ponteils-et-Brésis =

- Commune
- Coat of arms
- Location of Ponteils-et-Brésis
- Location within France Location within Occitanie
- Coordinates: 44°24′08″N 3°58′36″E
- Country: France
- Region: Occitania
- Department: Gard
- Arrondissement: Alès
- Canton: La Grand-Combe
- Intercommunality: CC Mont Lozère

Government
  - Mayor (2020–2026): Pierre de la Rue du Can
- Area^{1}: 27.80 km^{2} (10.73 sq mi)
- Elevation: 534 m (1,752 ft)
- Highest elevation: 1,484 m (4,869 ft)
- Lowest elevation: 371 m (1,217 ft)
- Population (2023): 365
  - Density: 13.1/km^{2} (34.0/sq mi)
- Time zone: UTC+01:00 (CET)
  - Summer (DST): UTC+02:00 (CEST)
- INSEE/Postal code: 30201 /48150
- ^{1} French Land Register data, which excludes lakes, ponds, glaciers > 1 km^{2} (0.386 sq mi or 247 acres) and river estuaries.

Ponteils-et-Brésis is a commune in the Gard department in southern France.

== Population ==
Historical population
Year	Pop.	±% p.a.
1968	312	—
1975	301	−0.51%
1982	353	+2.30%
1990	271	−3.25%
1999	280	+0.36%
2007	314	+1.44%
2012	352	+2.31%
2017	364	+0.67%
2023	365	+0.05%
Source: INSEE

== Monuments ==
- Château de Brésis, ruined 12th-century castle

== See also ==
- Communes of the Gard department
