= Vabres, Gard =

Vabres
- Commune
- Coat of arms
- Location of Vabres
- Location within France Location within Occitanie
- Coordinates: 44°02′01″N 3°53′18″E
- Country: France
- Region: Occitania
- Department: Gard
- Arrondissement: Alès
- Canton: La Grand-Combe
- Intercommunality: Alès Agglomération

Government
  - Mayor (2020–2026): Jean Noël Puddu
- Area^{1}: 4.75 km^{2} (1.83 sq mi)
- Elevation: 350 m (1,150 ft)
- Highest elevation: 521 m (1,709 ft)
- Lowest elevation: 239 m (784 ft)
- Population (2023): 139
  - Density: 29.3/km^{2} (75.8/sq mi)
- Time zone: UTC+01:00 (CET)
  - Summer (DST): UTC+02:00 (CEST)
- INSEE/Postal code: 30335 /30460
- ^{1} French Land Register data, which excludes lakes, ponds, glaciers > 1 km^{2} (0.386 sq mi or 247 acres) and river estuaries.

Vabres (French pronunciation: [vabʁ]) is a commune in the Gard department in southern France.

== Population ==
Historical population
Year	Pop.	±% p.a.
1968	65	—
1975	49	−3.96%
1982	62	+3.42%
1990	75	+2.41%
1999	102	+3.48%
2007	100	−0.25%
2012	102	+0.40%
2017	121	+3.48%
2023	139	+2.34%
Source: INSEE

== See also ==
- Communes of the Gard department
