= La Vernarède =

- Commune
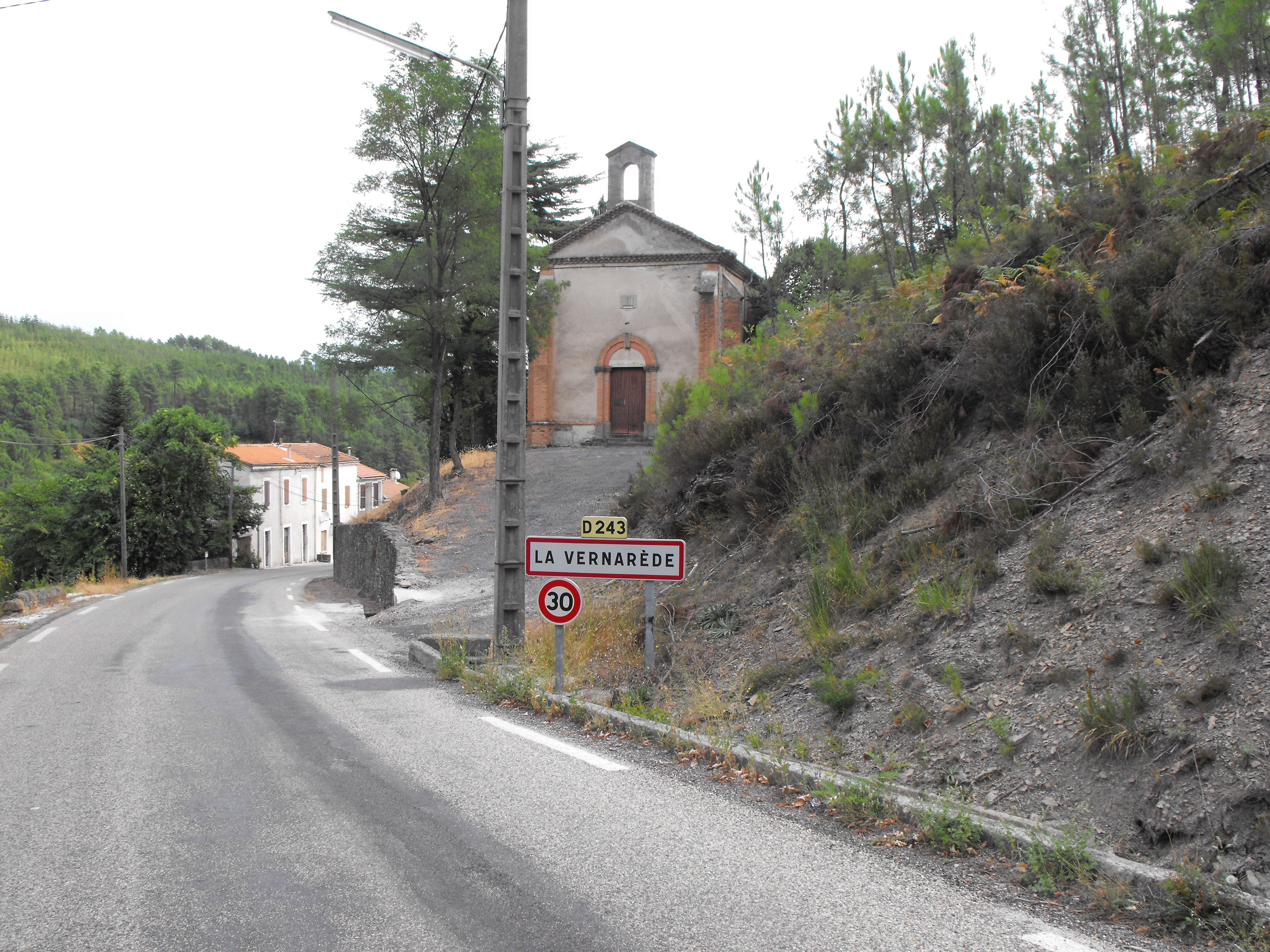
- The road into La Vernarède

- Coat of arms
- Location of La Vernarède
- Location within France Location within Occitanie
- Coordinates: 44°17′23″N 4°00′35″E
- Country: France
- Region: Occitania
- Department: Gard
- Arrondissement: Alès
- Canton: La Grand-Combe
- Intercommunality: Alès Agglomération

Government
  - Mayor (2020–2026): Christian Miaille
- Area^{1}: 5.59 km^{2} (2.16 sq mi)
- Elevation: 320 m (1,050 ft)
- Highest elevation: 644 m (2,113 ft)
- Lowest elevation: 307 m (1,007 ft)
- Population (2023): 364
  - Density: 65.1/km^{2} (169/sq mi)
- Time zone: UTC+01:00 (CET)
  - Summer (DST): UTC+02:00 (CEST)
- INSEE/Postal code: 30345 /30530
- ^{1} French Land Register data, which excludes lakes, ponds, glaciers > 1 km^{2} (0.386 sq mi or 247 acres) and river estuaries.

La Vernarède (French pronunciation: [la vɛʁnaʁɛd]; Occitan: La Vernareda) is a commune in the Gard department in southern France.

== Population ==
Historical population
Year	Pop.	±% p.a.
1968	943	—
1975	662	−4.93%
1982	534	−3.02%
1990	440	−2.39%
1999	389	−1.36%
2007	363	−0.86%
2012	340	−1.30%
2017	336	−0.24%
2023	364	+1.34%
Source: INSEE

== See also ==
- Communes of the Gard department
