= Lamelouze =

- Commune
- Coat of arms
- Location of Lamelouze
- Location within France Location within Occitanie
- Coordinates: 44°11′41″N 3°57′52″E
- Country: France
- Region: Occitania
- Department: Gard
- Arrondissement: Alès
- Canton: La Grand-Combe
- Intercommunality: Alès Agglomération

Government
  - Mayor (2023–2026): Bruno Biondini
- Area^{1}: 8.83 km^{2} (3.41 sq mi)
- Elevation: 800 m (2,600 ft)
- Highest elevation: 900 m (3,000 ft)
- Lowest elevation: 231 m (758 ft)
- Population (2023): 139
  - Density: 15.7/km^{2} (40.8/sq mi)
- Time zone: UTC+01:00 (CET)
  - Summer (DST): UTC+02:00 (CEST)
- INSEE/Postal code: 30137 /30110
- ^{1} French Land Register data, which excludes lakes, ponds, glaciers > 1 km^{2} (0.386 sq mi or 247 acres) and river estuaries.

Lamelouze (French pronunciation: [lamluz]; Occitan: La Melosa) is a commune in the Gard department in southern France.

== Population ==
Historical population
Year	Pop.	±% p.a.
1968	105	—
1975	81	−3.64%
1982	72	−1.67%
1990	79	+1.17%
1999	86	+0.95%
2007	84	−0.29%
2012	100	+3.55%
2017	139	+6.81%
2023	139	+0.00%
Source: INSEE

== See also ==
- Communes of the Gard department
