= Alès Agglomération =

Coordinates: 44°10′N 04°05′E

- Communauté d'agglomération
- Country: France
- Region: Occitania
- Department: Gard
- No. of communes: {{{nbcomm}}}
- Established: 2013
- Area: 920.9 km^{2} (355.6 sq mi)
- Population (2017): 129,157
  - Density: 140.3/km^{2} (363.2/sq mi)
- Website: www.ales.fr

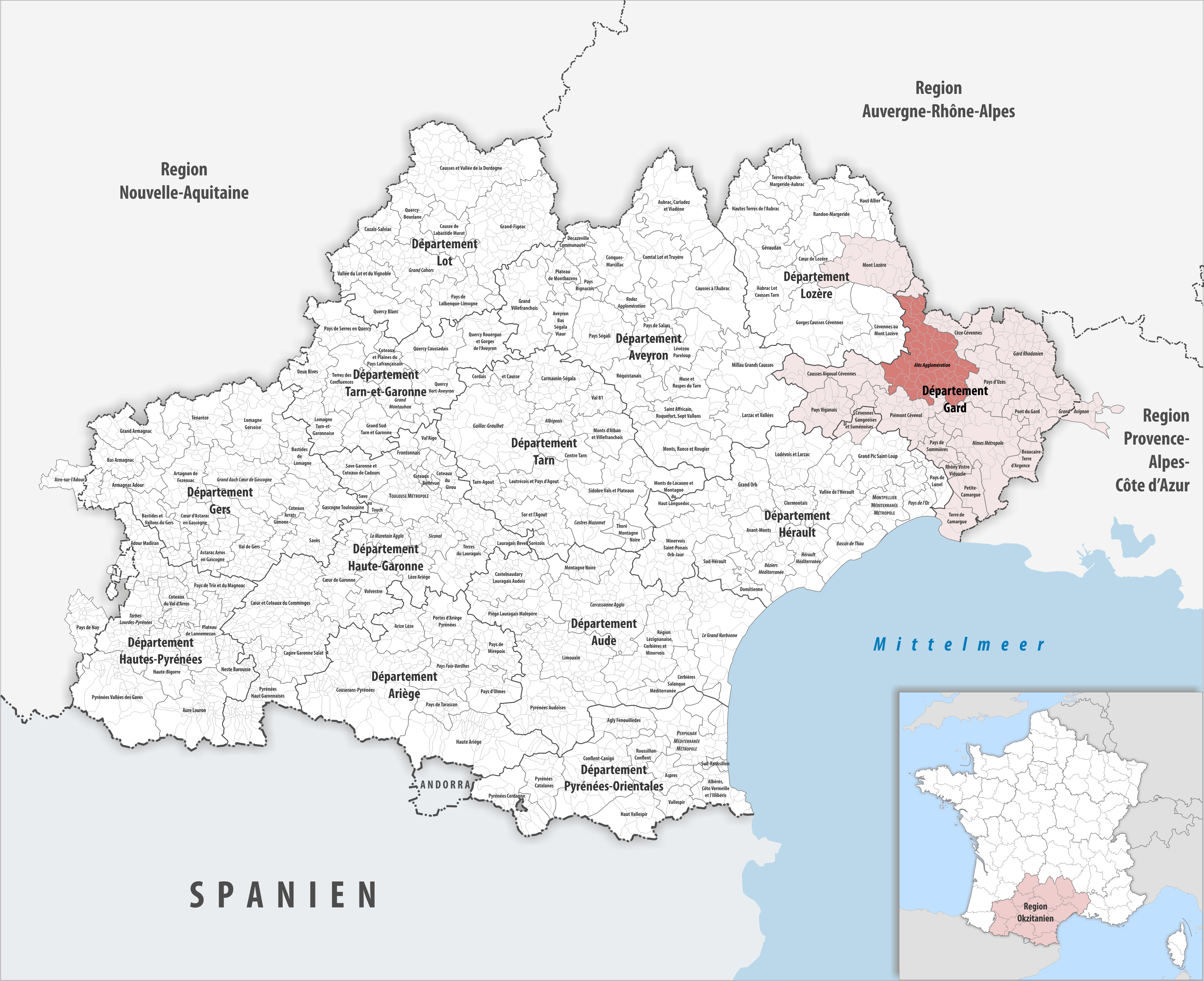

Alès Agglomération is the communauté d'agglomération, an intercommunal structure, centred on the city of Alès. It is located in the Gard department, in the Occitanie region, southern France. It was created in January 2013 by the merger of the former Communauté d'agglomération du Grand Alès with 3 former communautés de communes and 5 other communes. It was further expanded with 3 other communautés de communes in January 2017. Its seat is in Alès. Its population was 129,157 in 2017, of which 40,219 in Alès proper.

== Composition ==
The communauté d'agglomération consists of the following 71 communes:

1. Alès
2. Anduze
3. Aujac
4. Bagard
5. Boisset-et-Gaujac
6. Bonnevaux
7. Boucoiran-et-Nozières
8. Branoux-les-Taillades
9. Brignon
10. Brouzet-lès-Alès
11. Castelnau-Valence
12. Cendras
13. Chambon
14. Chamborigaud
15. Concoules
16. Cruviers-Lascours
17. Deaux
18. Euzet
19. Générargues
20. Génolhac
21. La Grand-Combe
22. Lamelouze
23. Laval-Pradel
24. Lézan
25. Les Mages
26. Martignargues
27. Le Martinet
28. Massanes
29. Massillargues-Attuech
30. Méjannes-lès-Alès
31. Mialet
32. Mons
33. Monteils
34. Ners
35. Les Plans
36. Portes
37. Ribaute-les-Tavernes
38. Rousson
39. Saint-Bonnet-de-Salendrinque
40. Saint-Césaire-de-Gauzignan
41. Saint-Christol-lès-Alès
42. Sainte-Cécile-d'Andorge
43. Sainte-Croix-de-Caderle
44. Saint-Étienne-de-l'Olm
45. Saint-Florent-sur-Auzonnet
46. Saint-Hilaire-de-Brethmas
47. Saint-Hippolyte-de-Caton
48. Saint-Jean-de-Ceyrargues
49. Saint-Jean-de-Serres
50. Saint-Jean-de-Valériscle
51. Saint-Jean-du-Gard
52. Saint-Jean-du-Pin
53. Saint-Julien-de-Cassagnas
54. Saint-Julien-les-Rosiers
55. Saint-Just-et-Vacquières
56. Saint-Martin-de-Valgalgues
57. Saint-Maurice-de-Cazevieille
58. Saint-Paul-la-Coste
59. Saint-Privat-des-Vieux
60. Saint-Sébastien-d'Aigrefeuille
61. Salindres
62. Les Salles-du-Gardon
63. Sénéchas
64. Servas
65. Seynes
66. Soustelle
67. Thoiras-Corbès
68. Tornac
69. Vabres
70. La Vernarède
71. Vézénobres
