= Chambon, Gard =

Commune in Occitanie, France

Chambon
- Commune
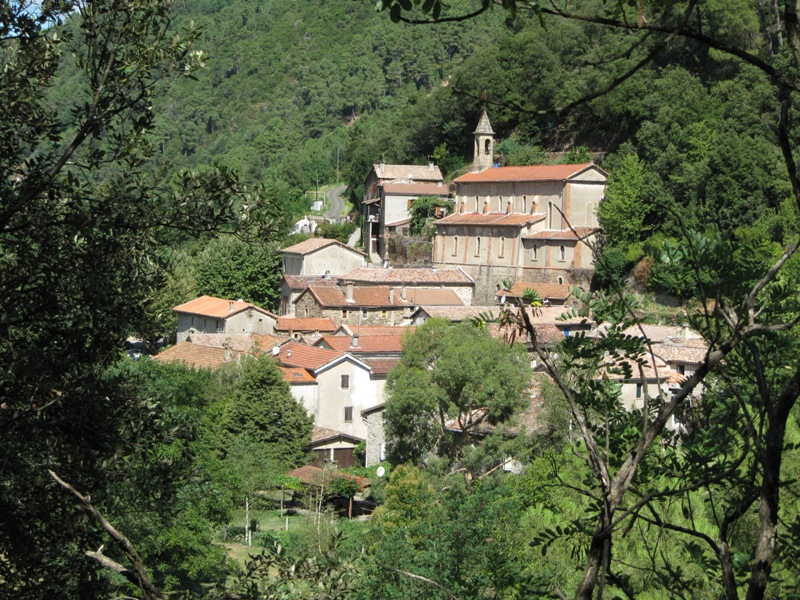
- A general view of Chambon
- Location of Chambon
- Location within France Location within Occitanie
- Coordinates: 44°18′10″N 4°01′07″E
- Country: France
- Region: Occitania
- Department: Gard
- Arrondissement: Alès
- Canton: La Grand-Combe
- Intercommunality: Alès Agglomération

Government
  - Mayor (2020–2026): Marc Sasso
- Area^{1}: 14.65 km^{2} (5.66 sq mi)
- Elevation: 250 m (820 ft)
- Highest elevation: 644 m (2,113 ft)
- Lowest elevation: 207 m (679 ft)
- Population (2023): 260
  - Density: 18/km^{2} (46/sq mi)
- Time zone: UTC+01:00 (CET)
  - Summer (DST): UTC+02:00 (CEST)
- INSEE/Postal code: 30079 /30450
- ^{1} French Land Register data, which excludes lakes, ponds, glaciers > 1 km^{2} (0.386 sq mi or 247 acres) and river estuaries.

Chambon (French pronunciation: [ʃɑ̃bɔ̃]; Occitan: Lo Chambon) is a commune in the Gard department in southern France.

== Population ==
Historical population
Year	Pop.	±% p.a.
1968	273	—
1975	222	−2.91%
1982	183	−2.72%
1990	196	+0.86%
1999	240	+2.28%
2007	273	+1.62%
2012	297	+1.70%
2017	266	−2.18%
2023	260	−0.38%
Source: INSEE

== See also ==
- Communes of the Gard department
