= Soustelle =

- Commune
- Coat of arms
- Location of Soustelle
- Location within France Location within Occitanie
- Coordinates: 44°10′33″N 4°00′44″E
- Country: France
- Region: Occitania
- Department: Gard
- Arrondissement: Alès
- Canton: La Grand-Combe
- Intercommunality: Alès Agglomération

Government
  - Mayor (2020–2026): Georges Ribot
- Area^{1}: 11.09 km^{2} (4.28 sq mi)
- Elevation: 406 m (1,332 ft)
- Highest elevation: 600 m (2,000 ft)
- Lowest elevation: 160 m (520 ft)
- Population (2023): 119
  - Density: 10.7/km^{2} (27.8/sq mi)
- Time zone: UTC+01:00 (CET)
  - Summer (DST): UTC+02:00 (CEST)
- INSEE/Postal code: 30323 /30110
- ^{1} French Land Register data, which excludes lakes, ponds, glaciers > 1 km^{2} (0.386 sq mi or 247 acres) and river estuaries.

Soustelle (French pronunciation: [sustɛl]; Occitan: Sostèla) is a commune in the Gard department in southern France.

== Population ==
Historical population
Year	Pop.	±% p.a.
1968	112	—
1975	109	−0.39%
1982	109	+0.00%
1990	97	−1.45%
1999	125	+2.86%
2007	148	+2.13%
2012	154	+0.80%
2017	123	−4.40%
2023	119	−0.55%
Source: INSEE

== See also ==
- Communes of the Gard department
