= Saint-Sébastien-d'Aigrefeuille =

- Commune
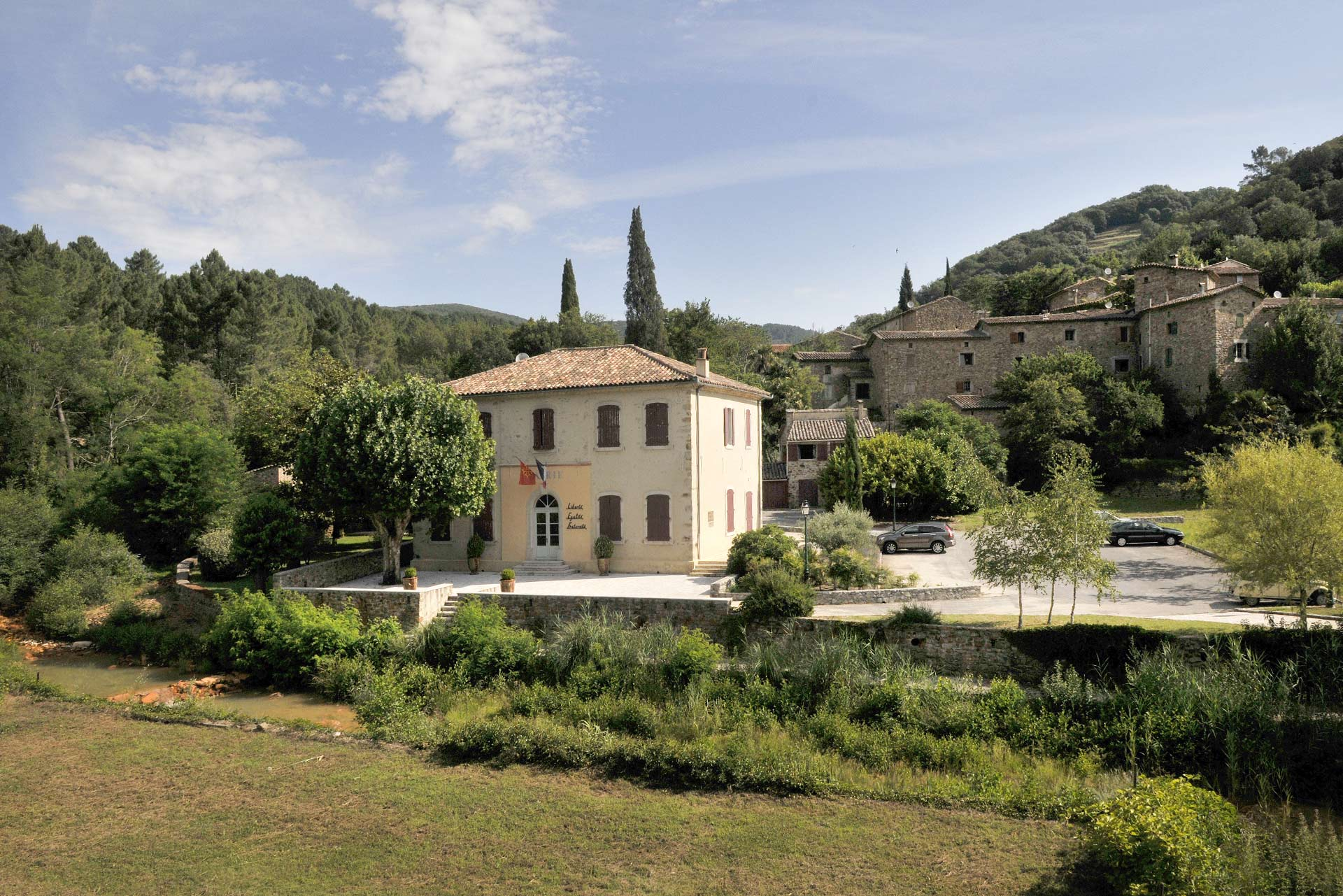
- Saint-Sébastien-d'Aigrefeuille Town hall

- Coat of arms
- Location of Saint-Sébastien-d'Aigrefeuille
- Location within France Location within Occitanie
- Coordinates: 44°06′28″N 3°59′42″E
- Country: France
- Region: Occitania
- Department: Gard
- Arrondissement: Alès
- Canton: La Grand-Combe
- Intercommunality: Alès Agglomération

Government
  - Mayor (2020–2026): Guy Manifacier
- Area^{1}: 15.82 km^{2} (6.11 sq mi)
- Elevation: 125 m (410 ft)
- Highest elevation: 669 m (2,195 ft)
- Lowest elevation: 167 m (548 ft)
- Population (2023): 513
  - Density: 32.4/km^{2} (84.0/sq mi)
- Time zone: UTC+01:00 (CET)
  - Summer (DST): UTC+02:00 (CEST)
- INSEE/Postal code: 30298 /30140
- ^{1} French Land Register data, which excludes lakes, ponds, glaciers > 1 km^{2} (0.386 sq mi or 247 acres) and river estuaries.

Saint-Sébastien-d'Aigrefeuille (French pronunciation: [sɛ̃ sebastjɛ̃ dɛɡʁəfœj]; Occitan: Sent Sebastian d'Agrifuèlh) is a commune in the Gard department in southern France.

== Population ==
Historical population
Year	Pop.	±% p.a.
1968	173	—
1975	228	+4.02%
1982	270	+2.44%
1990	357	+3.55%
1999	434	+2.19%
2007	494	+1.63%
2012	529	+1.38%
2017	500	−1.12%
2023	513	+0.43%
Source: INSEE

== See also ==
- Communes of the Gard department
