= Sainte-Croix-de-Caderle =

- Commune
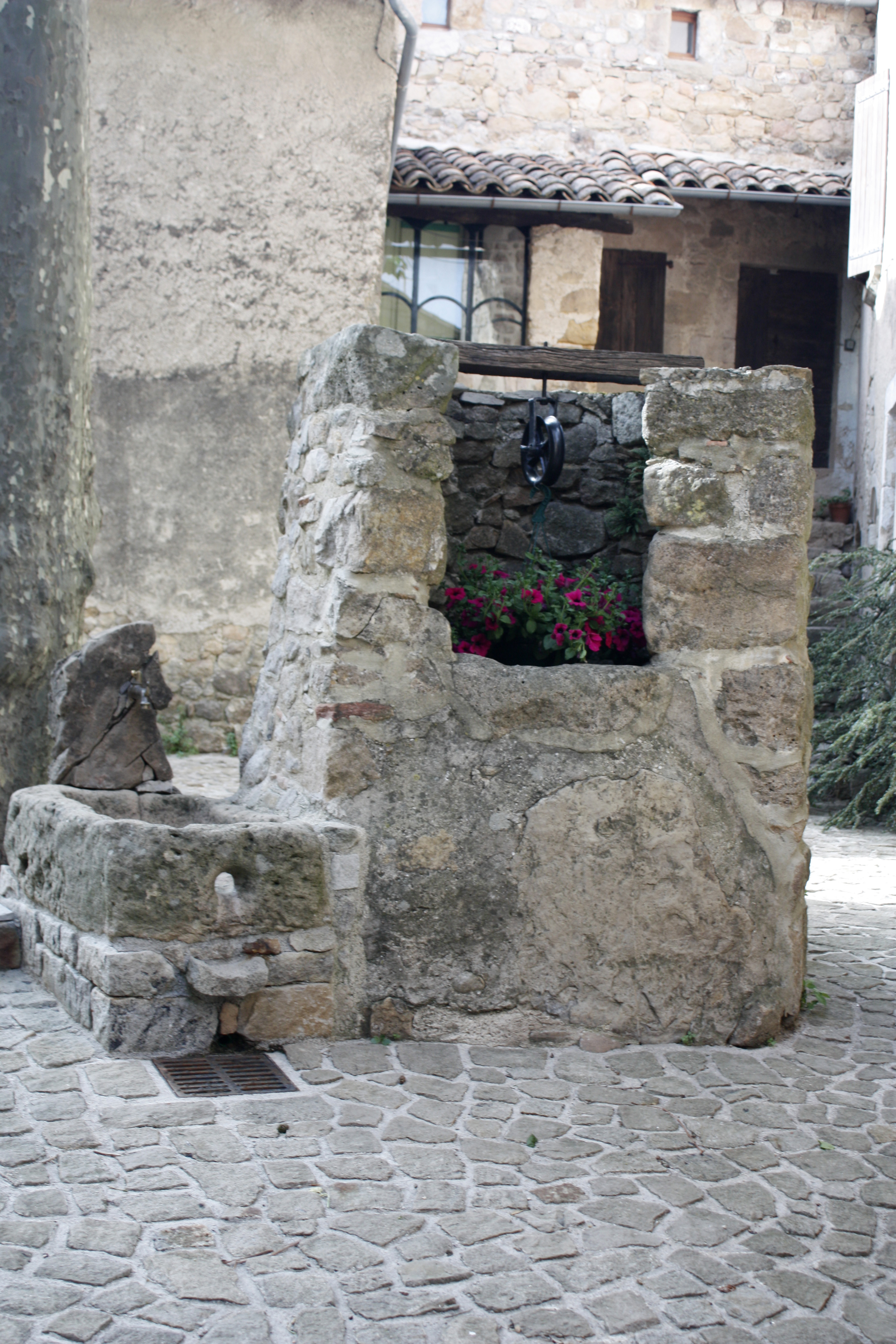
- Communal well

- Coat of arms
- Location of Sainte-Croix-de-Caderle
- Location within France Location within Occitanie
- Coordinates: 44°04′16″N 3°51′57″E
- Country: France
- Region: Occitania
- Department: Gard
- Arrondissement: Alès
- Canton: La Grand-Combe
- Intercommunality: Alès Agglomération

Government
  - Mayor (2024–2026): Ginette Lafont
- Area^{1}: 7.63 km^{2} (2.95 sq mi)
- Elevation: 530 m (1,740 ft)
- Highest elevation: 813 m (2,667 ft)
- Lowest elevation: 240 m (790 ft)
- Population (2023): 97
  - Density: 13/km^{2} (33/sq mi)
- Time zone: UTC+01:00 (CET)
  - Summer (DST): UTC+02:00 (CEST)
- INSEE/Postal code: 30246 /30460
- ^{1} French Land Register data, which excludes lakes, ponds, glaciers > 1 km^{2} (0.386 sq mi or 247 acres) and river estuaries.

Sainte-Croix-de-Caderle (French pronunciation: [sɛ̃t kʁwa də kadɛʁl]; Occitan: Senta Crotz de Cadèrla) is a commune in the Gard department in southern France.

== Population ==
Historical population
Year	Pop.	±% p.a.
1968	77	—
1975	66	−2.18%
1982	82	+3.15%
1990	106	+3.26%
1999	106	+0.00%
2007	115	+1.02%
2012	122	+1.19%
2017	113	−1.52%
2023	97	−2.51%
Source: INSEE

== See also ==
- Communes of the Gard department
