= Château de Brésis =

Ruined castle in Occitania, France

Coordinates: 44.3841°N 3.9826°E

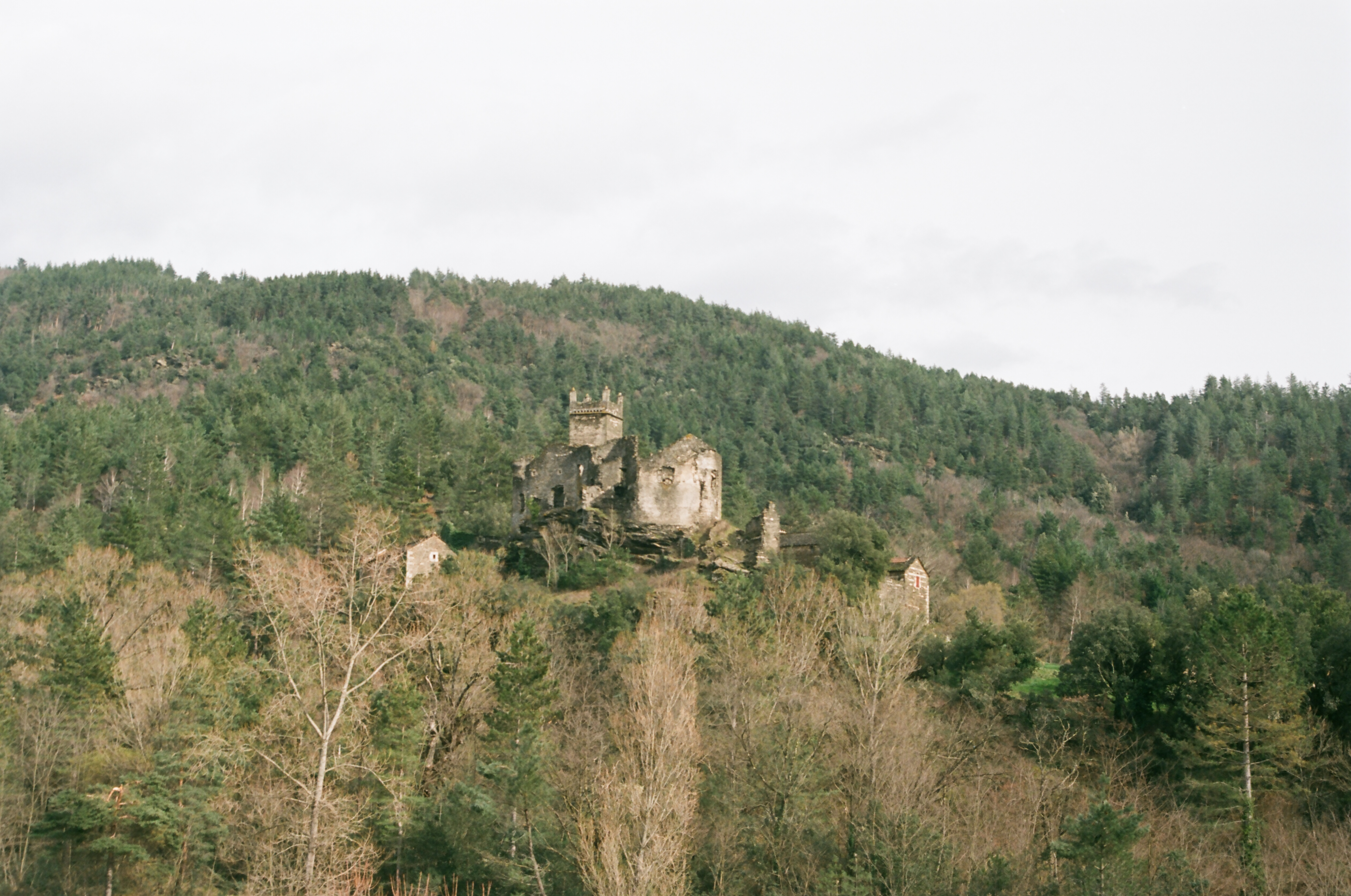
Château de Brésis

The Château de Brésis (also known as Brisis) is a ruined castle in the commune of Ponteils-et-Brésis in the Gard département of France.

The ruins consist of a keep of four storeys surrounded by an enceinte.

== History ==
The castle was constructed in the 12th century for surveillance of the bridge over the Cèze. It belonged to the Hérail family. In the 19th century, deserted after the French Revolution, it fell into ruin. Dressed stones around the windows and doors were sold or pillaged by neighbours.

It has been listed since 1997 as a monument historique by the French Ministry of Culture. The protected parts are the keep, the enceinte and the chapel.

== See also ==
- List of castles in France
