= Sénéchas =

- Commune
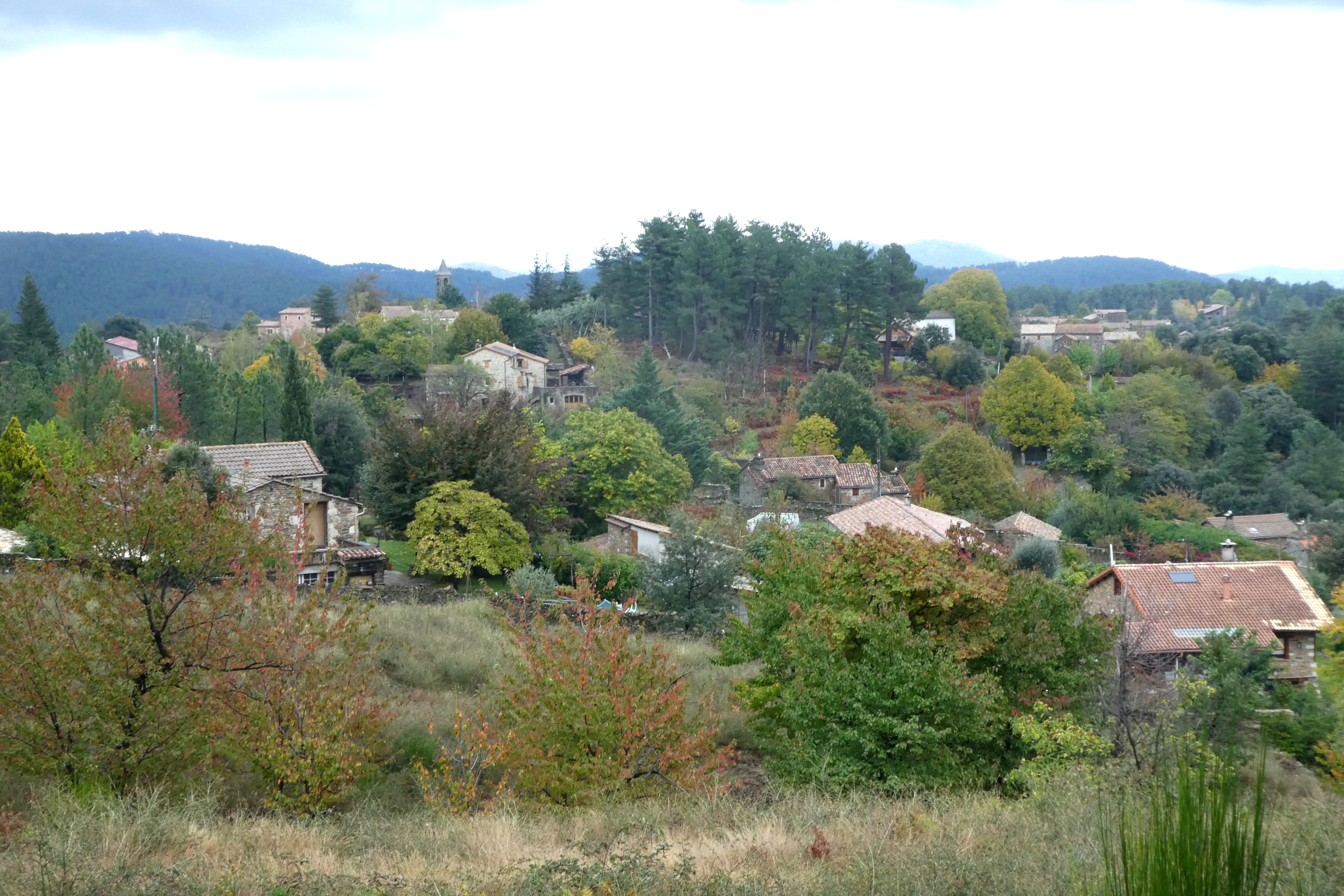
- View of the village

- Coat of arms
- Location of Sénéchas
- Location within France Location within Occitanie
- Coordinates: 44°19′33″N 4°01′42″E
- Country: France
- Region: Occitania
- Department: Gard
- Arrondissement: Alès
- Canton: La Grand-Combe
- Intercommunality: Alès Agglomération

Government
  - Mayor (2020–2026): René Meurtin
- Area^{1}: 14.86 km^{2} (5.74 sq mi)
- Elevation: 470 m (1,540 ft)
- Highest elevation: 644 m (2,113 ft)
- Lowest elevation: 241 m (791 ft)
- Population (2023): 247
  - Density: 16.6/km^{2} (43.1/sq mi)
- Time zone: UTC+01:00 (CET)
  - Summer (DST): UTC+02:00 (CEST)
- INSEE/Postal code: 30316 /30450
- ^{1} French Land Register data, which excludes lakes, ponds, glaciers > 1 km^{2} (0.386 sq mi or 247 acres) and river estuaries.

Sénéchas (French pronunciation: [seneʃas]; Occitan: Seneschàs) is a commune in the Gard department in southern France.

== Population ==
Historical population
Year	Pop.	±% p.a.
1968	134	—
1975	113	−2.41%
1982	167	+5.74%
1990	178	+0.80%
1999	192	+0.84%
2007	221	+1.77%
2012	232	+0.98%
2017	247	+1.26%
2023	247	+0.00%
Source: INSEE

== See also ==
- Communes of the Gard department
