= Concoules =

- Commune
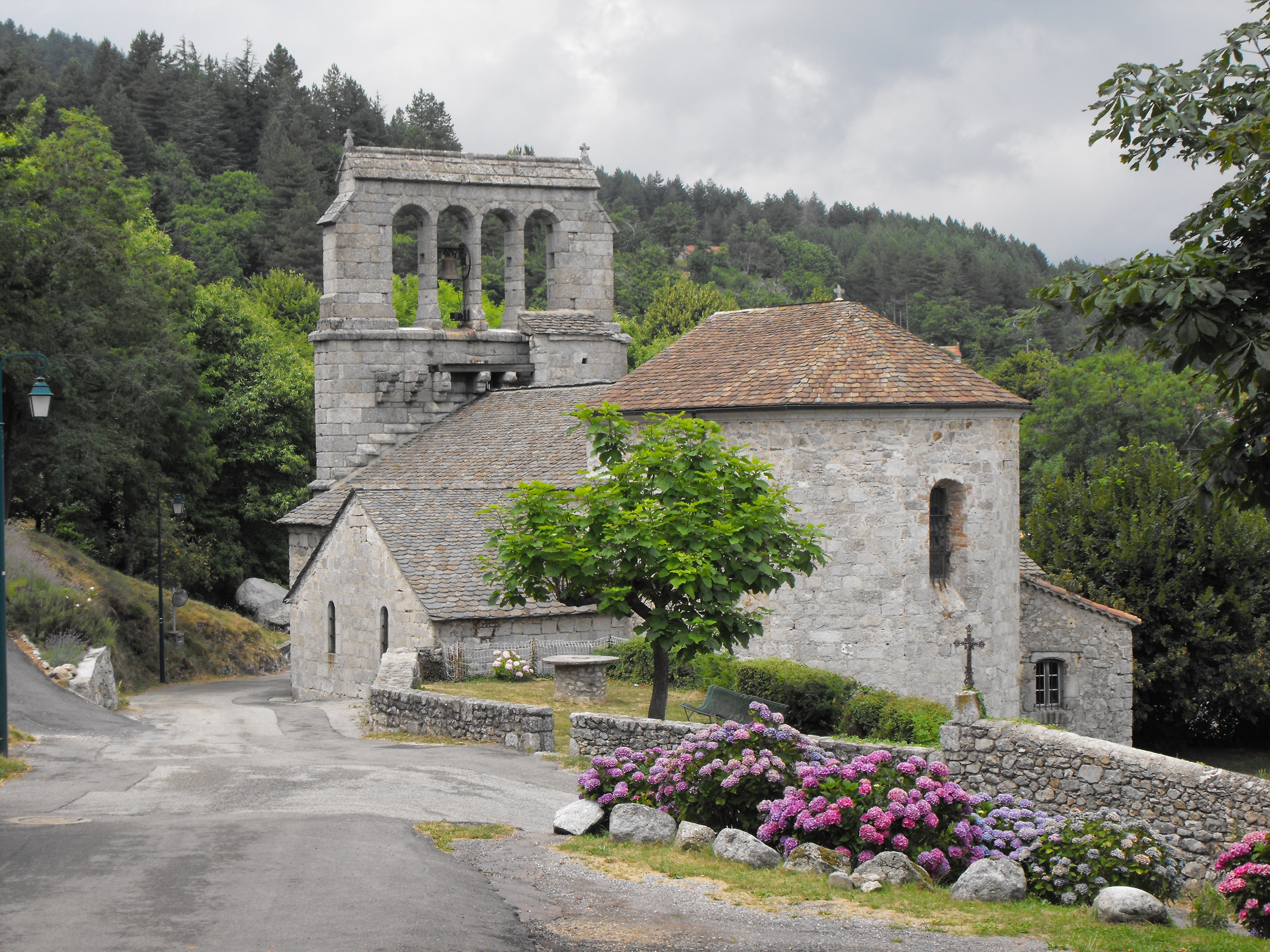
- The church of Concoules

- Coat of arms
- Location of Concoules
- Location within France Location within Occitanie
- Coordinates: 44°23′01″N 3°56′17″E
- Country: France
- Region: Occitania
- Department: Gard
- Arrondissement: Alès
- Canton: La Grand-Combe
- Intercommunality: Alès Agglomération

Government
  - Mayor (2020–2026): Jean-Marie Malaval
- Area^{1}: 16.47 km^{2} (6.36 sq mi)
- Elevation: 630 m (2,070 ft)
- Highest elevation: 1,507 m (4,944 ft)
- Lowest elevation: 355 m (1,165 ft)
- Population (2023): 277
  - Density: 16.8/km^{2} (43.6/sq mi)
- Time zone: UTC+01:00 (CET)
  - Summer (DST): UTC+02:00 (CEST)
- INSEE/Postal code: 30090 /30450
- ^{1} French Land Register data, which excludes lakes, ponds, glaciers > 1 km^{2} (0.386 sq mi or 247 acres) and river estuaries.

Concoules (French pronunciation: [kɔ̃kul]; Occitan: Concolas) is a commune in the Gard department in southern France.

== Population ==
Historical population
Year	Pop.	±% p.a.
1968	238	—
1975	262	+1.38%
1982	241	−1.19%
1990	236	−0.26%
1999	256	+0.91%
2007	260	+0.19%
2012	254	−0.47%
2017	258	+0.31%
2023	277	+1.19%
Source: INSEE

== See also ==
- Communes of the Gard department
