= David Giraudo =

French footballer (born 1970)

Personal information
- Full name: David Giraudo
- Date of birth: 3 February 1970 (age 56)
- Place of birth: Les Salles-du-Gardon, France
- Height: 1.84 m (6 ft 0 in)
- Position: Defender

Senior career*
Years	Team	Apps	(Gls)
1989–1995	Olympique Alès	172	(2)
1995–1999	Red Star 93	113	(4)
1999–2000	Académica	15	(0)
2000–2001	Sporting Espinho	29	(0)
Total		329	(6)
- * Club domestic league appearances and goals

David Giraudo (born 3 February 1970) is a French former professional footballer who played as a defender in Ligue 2 for Red Star 93 and Olympique Alès. Towards the end of his career, Giraudo played in Portugal for Académica and Sporting Espinho.

== See also ==
- Football in France
- List of football clubs in France
