= Les Salles-du-Gardon =

- Commune
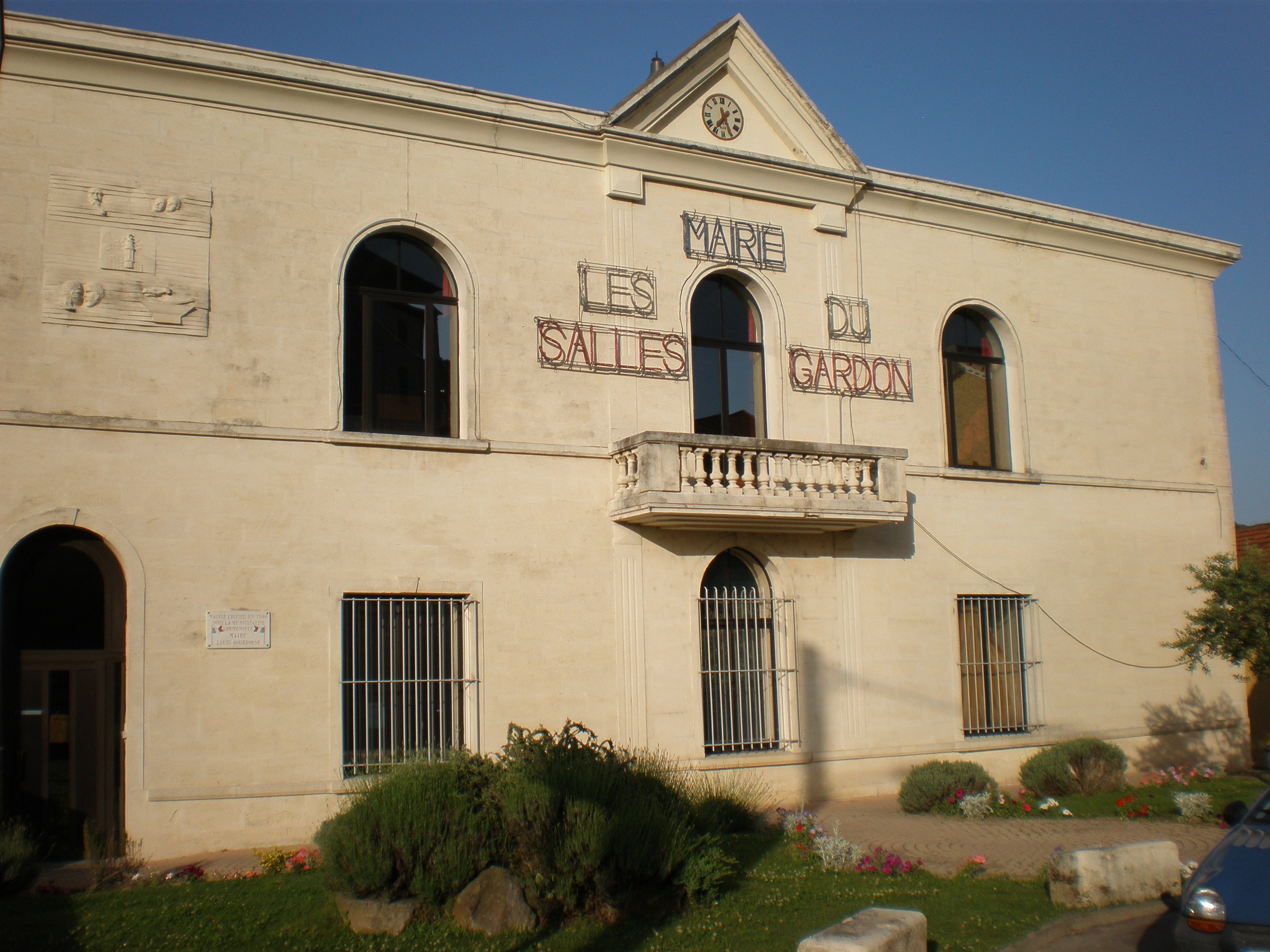
- Town hall
- Location of Les Salles-du-Gardon
- Location within France Location within Occitanie
- Coordinates: 44°12′29″N 4°02′08″E
- Country: France
- Region: Occitania
- Department: Gard
- Arrondissement: Alès
- Canton: La Grand-Combe
- Intercommunality: Alès Agglomération

Government
  - Mayor (2020–2026): Georges Brioudes
- Area^{1}: 21.09 km^{2} (8.14 sq mi)
- Elevation: 300 m (980 ft)
- Highest elevation: 723 m (2,372 ft)
- Lowest elevation: 145 m (476 ft)
- Population (2023): 2,395
  - Density: 113.6/km^{2} (294.1/sq mi)
- Time zone: UTC+01:00 (CET)
  - Summer (DST): UTC+02:00 (CEST)
- INSEE/Postal code: 30307 /30110
- ^{1} French Land Register data, which excludes lakes, ponds, glaciers > 1 km^{2} (0.386 sq mi or 247 acres) and river estuaries.

Les Salles-du-Gardon (French pronunciation: [le sal dy ɡaʁdɔ̃]; Occitan: Las Salas de Gardon) is a commune in the Gard department in southern France.

== Population ==
Historical population

Year	Pop.	±% p.a.
1831	1,188	—
1846	1,041	−0.88%
1872	1,035	−0.02%
1901	1,523	+1.34%
1926	1,831	+0.74%
1946	2,494	+1.56%
1962	5,357	+4.89%
1968	4,548	−2.69%

Year	Pop.	±% p.a.
1975	3,904	−2.16%
1982	3,534	−1.41%
1990	3,063	−1.77%
1999	2,571	−1.93%
2007	2,585	+0.07%
2012	2,547	−0.30%
2017	2,600	+0.41%
2023	2,395	−1.36%

Source: EHESS and INSEE (1968–2023)

== Notable people ==
- David Giraudo (born 1970), footballer

== See also ==
- Communes of the Gard department
