= Portes, Gard =

Portes
- Commune
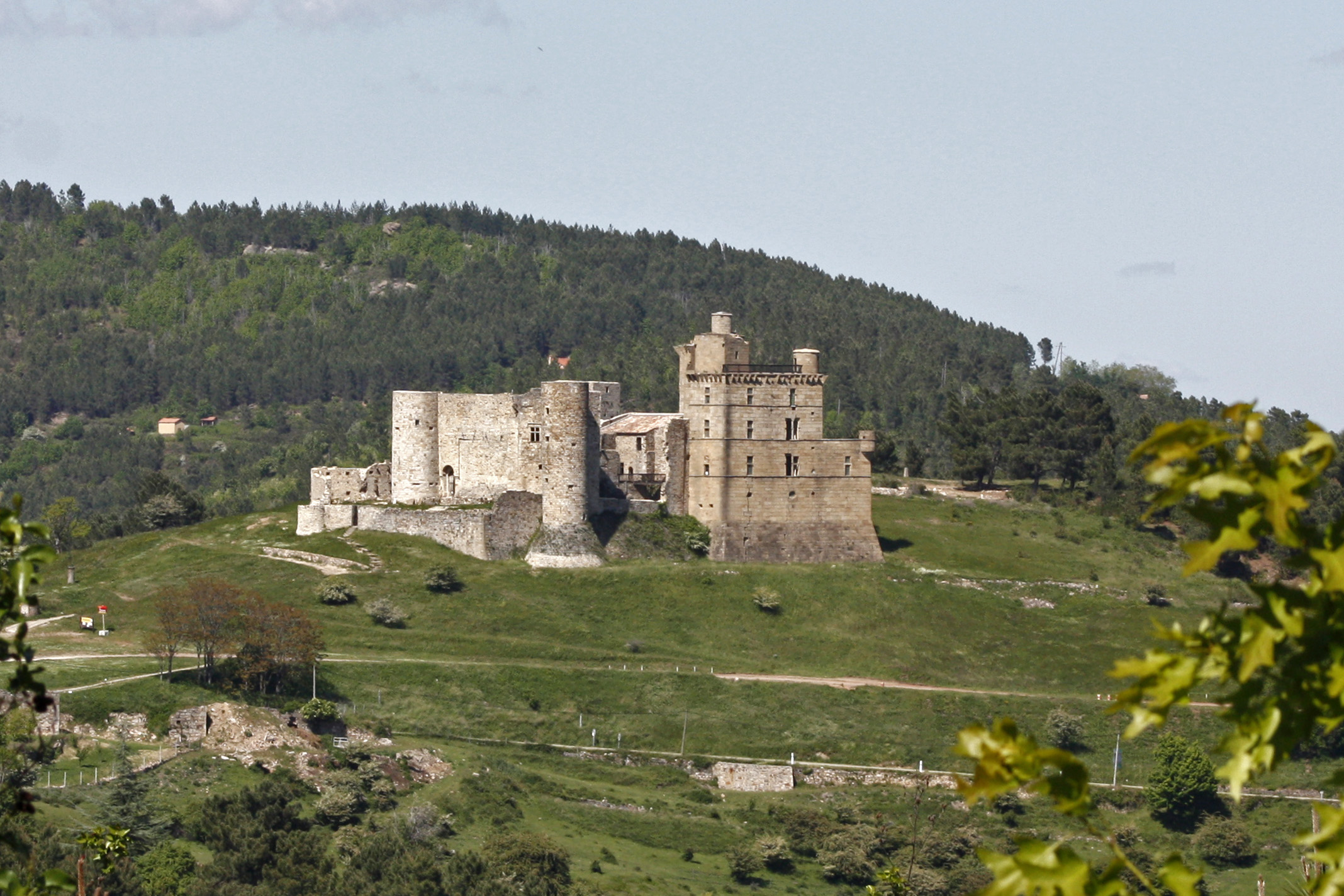
- Chateau

- Coat of arms
- Location of Portes
- Location within France Location within Occitanie
- Coordinates: 44°16′17″N 4°01′15″E
- Country: France
- Region: Occitania
- Department: Gard
- Arrondissement: Alès
- Canton: La Grand-Combe
- Intercommunality: Alès Agglomération

Government
  - Mayor (2025–2026): Catherine Pinaire
- Area^{1}: 14.42 km^{2} (5.57 sq mi)
- Elevation: 550 m (1,800 ft)
- Highest elevation: 735 m (2,411 ft)
- Lowest elevation: 279 m (915 ft)
- Population (2023): 320
  - Density: 22/km^{2} (57/sq mi)
- Time zone: UTC+01:00 (CET)
  - Summer (DST): UTC+02:00 (CEST)
- INSEE/Postal code: 30203 /30530
- ^{1} French Land Register data, which excludes lakes, ponds, glaciers > 1 km^{2} (0.386 sq mi or 247 acres) and river estuaries.

Portes (Occitan: Pòrtas) is a commune in the Gard department in southern France.

== Population ==
Historical population
Year	Pop.	±% p.a.
1968	579	—
1975	388	−5.56%
1982	369	−0.71%
1990	313	−2.04%
1999	310	−0.11%
2007	359	+1.85%
2012	363	+0.22%
2017	344	−1.07%
2023	320	−1.20%
Source: INSEE

== See also ==
- Communes of the Gard department
- Château de Portes
