= Branoux-les-Taillades =

Commune in Occitanie, France

- Commune
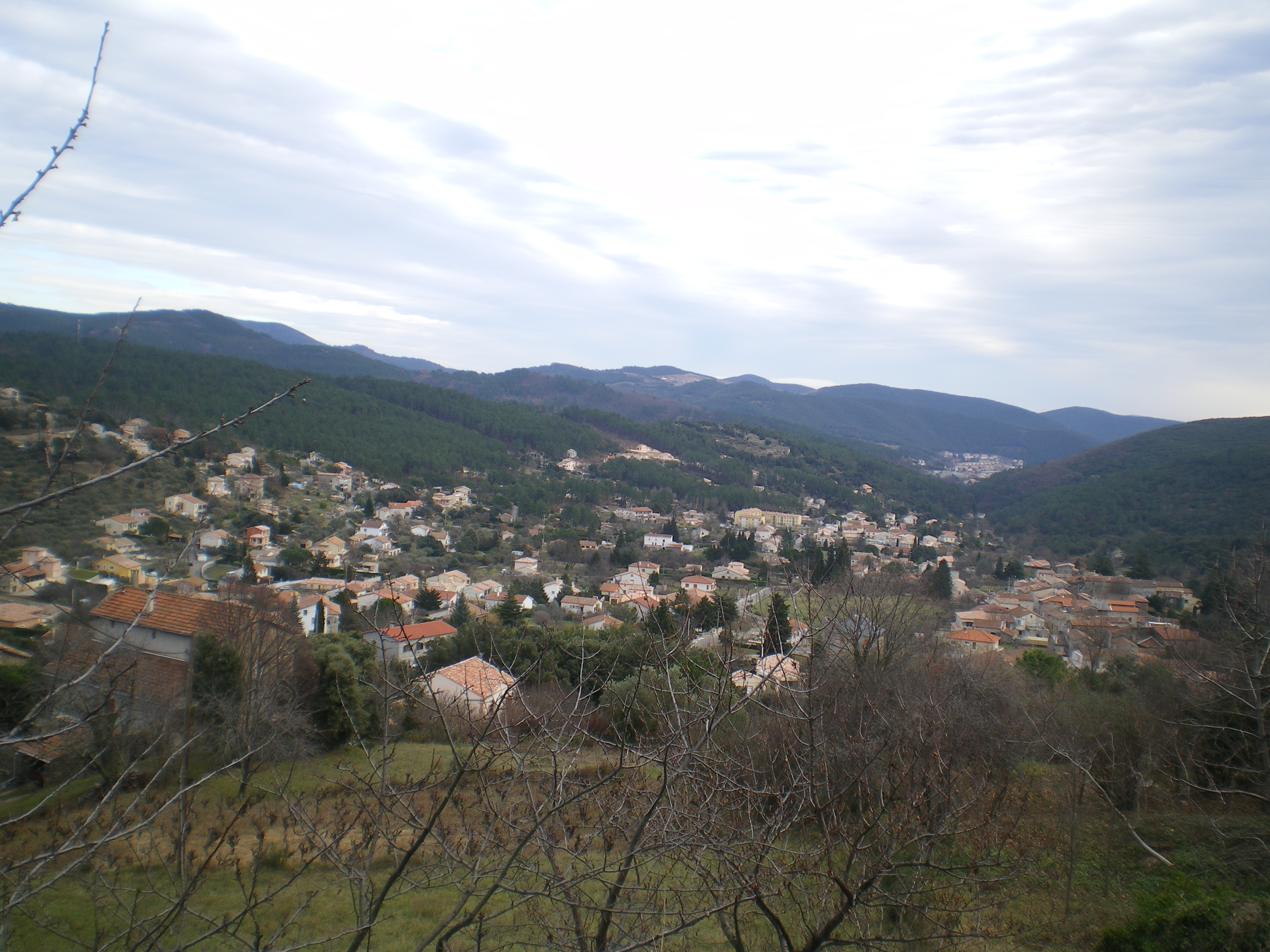
- A general view of Branoux-les-Taillades

- Coat of arms
- Location of Branoux-les-Taillades
- Location within France Location within Occitanie
- Coordinates: 44°13′16″N 3°59′27″E
- Country: France
- Region: Occitania
- Department: Gard
- Arrondissement: Alès
- Canton: La Grand-Combe
- Intercommunality: Alès Agglomération

Government
  - Mayor (2020–2026): Michel Vigne
- Area^{1}: 15.02 km^{2} (5.80 sq mi)
- Elevation: 360 m (1,180 ft)
- Highest elevation: 900 m (3,000 ft)
- Lowest elevation: 189 m (620 ft)
- Population (2023): 1,278
  - Density: 85.09/km^{2} (220.4/sq mi)
- Time zone: UTC+01:00 (CET)
  - Summer (DST): UTC+02:00 (CEST)
- INSEE/Postal code: 30051 /30110
- ^{1} French Land Register data, which excludes lakes, ponds, glaciers > 1 km^{2} (0.386 sq mi or 247 acres) and river estuaries.

Branoux-les-Taillades (French pronunciation: [bʁanu le tajad]; Occitan: Branós e las Talhadas) is a commune in the Gard department in southern France, and in the region Occitanie.

== Geography ==
=== Localization ===
Branoux is located near the mountain la Baraque, and close to the D32 road, on a relatively flat place called la Plaine. Les Taillades is an extension due to the demographic boom caused by the influx of workers and miners employed in la Grand-Combe. Les Taillades was built in the Gardon valley, on the right bank and crossed by the RN106. Blannaves is a hamlet, mostly in ruins and close to the Cambous Lake.

==== Hamlets ====
- L'Abrit
- L'Arenas
- Branoux
- Le Camp des Nonnes
- Le Castanet de Blannaves
- La Civadière
- Le Fraissinet
- Le Galissard
- Le Lauzas
- Mas de Léon
- Le Monnier
- La Planquette
- Les Taillades

== Population ==
Historical population
Year	Pop.	±% p.a.
1968	1,697	—
1975	1,424	−2.47%
1982	1,404	−0.20%
1990	1,338	−0.60%
1999	1,274	−0.54%
2007	1,284	+0.10%
2012	1,408	+1.86%
2017	1,340	−0.99%
2023	1,278	−0.79%
Source: INSEE

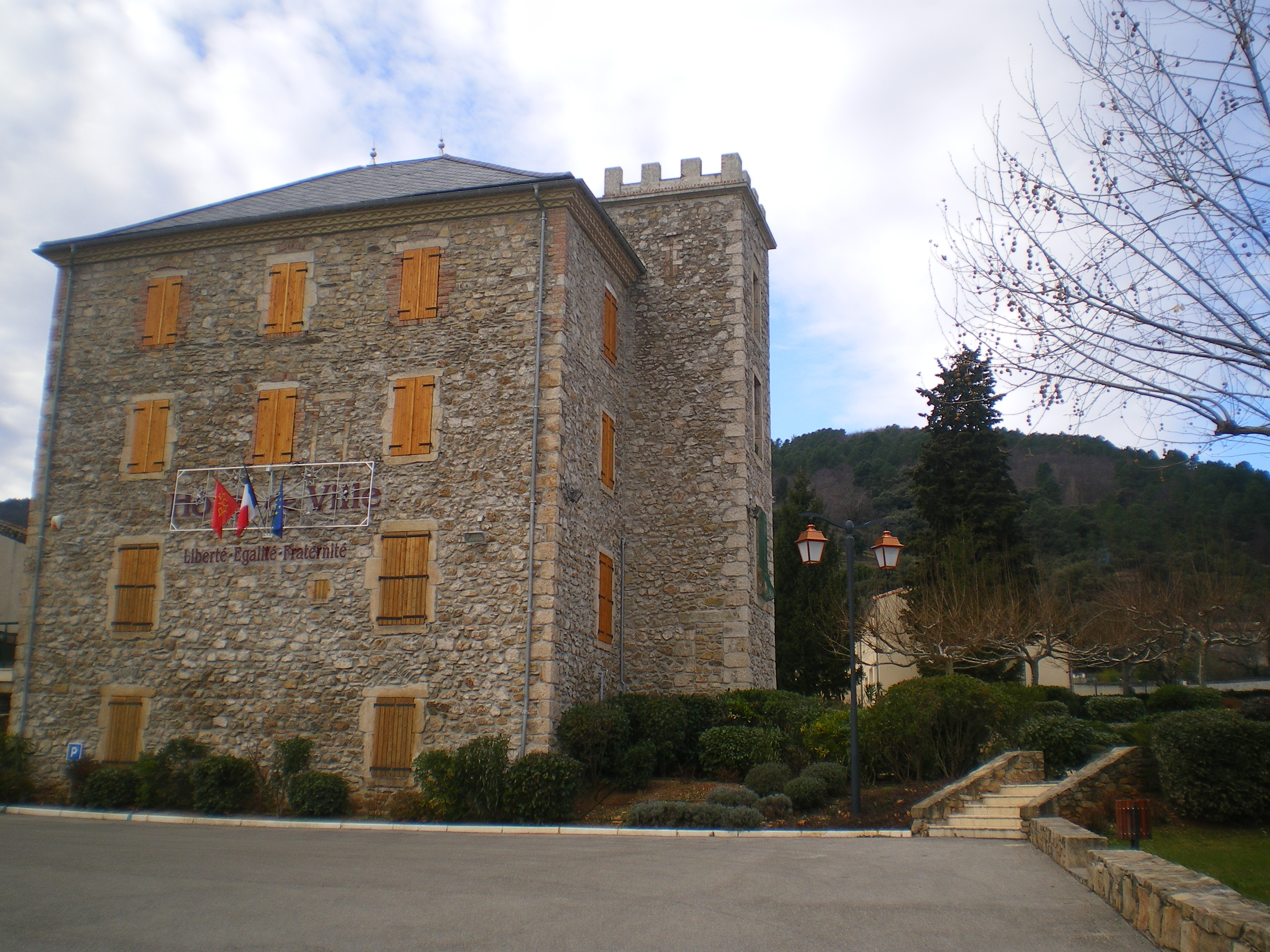
The townhall.

== See also ==
- Communes of the Gard department
