= Génolhac =

- Commune
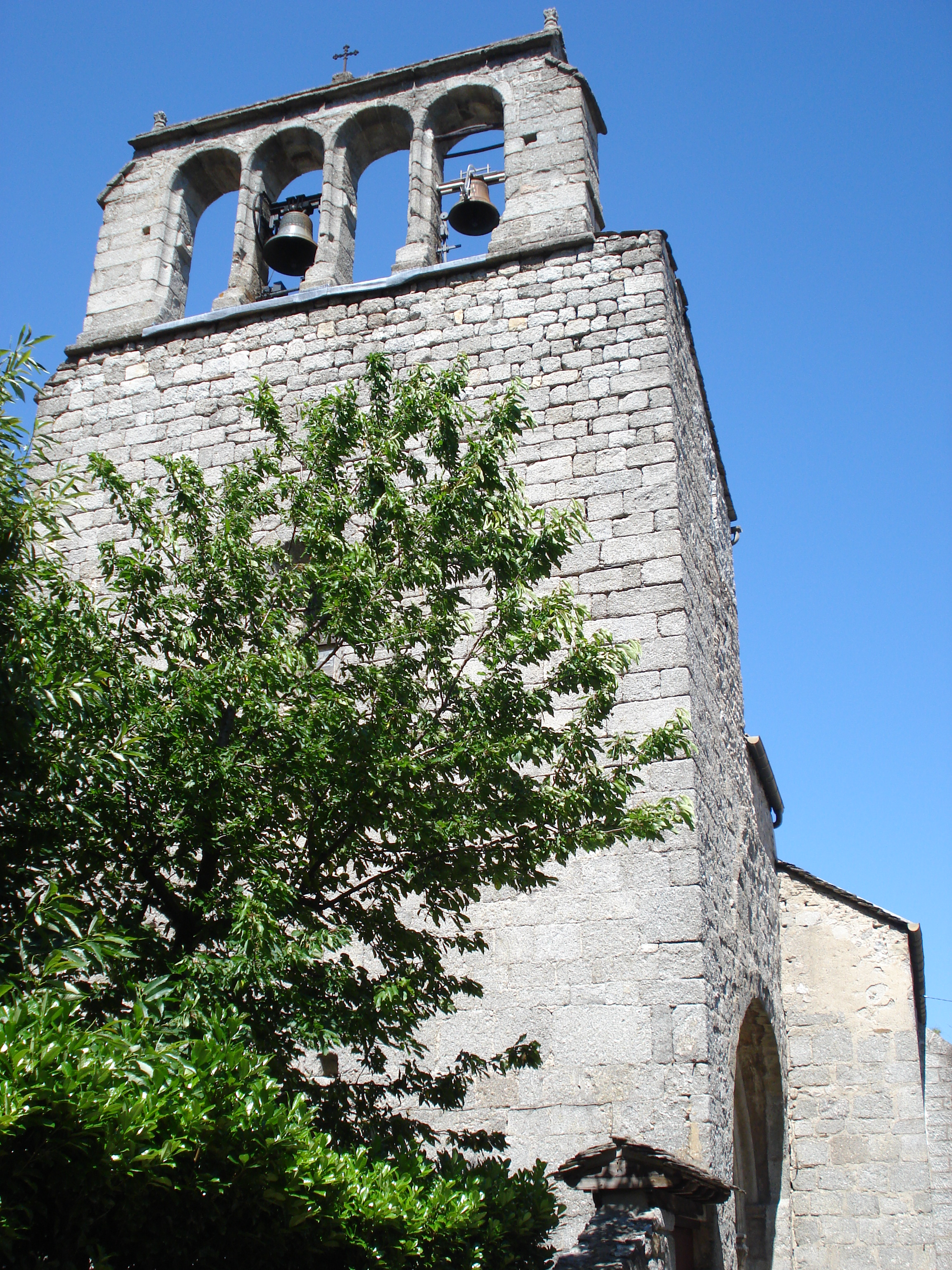
- The bell tower of the church in Génolhac

- Coat of arms
- Location of Génolhac
- Location within France Location within Occitanie
- Coordinates: 44°21′02″N 3°57′00″E
- Country: France
- Region: Occitania
- Department: Gard
- Arrondissement: Alès
- Canton: La Grand-Combe
- Intercommunality: Alès Agglomération

Government
  - Mayor (2020–2026): Guy Cheron
- Area^{1}: 17.30 km^{2} (6.68 sq mi)
- Elevation: 500 m (1,600 ft)
- Highest elevation: 1,416 m (4,646 ft)
- Lowest elevation: 293 m (961 ft)
- Population (2023): 815
  - Density: 47.1/km^{2} (122/sq mi)
- Time zone: UTC+01:00 (CET)
  - Summer (DST): UTC+02:00 (CEST)
- INSEE/Postal code: 30130 /30450
- ^{1} French Land Register data, which excludes lakes, ponds, glaciers > 1 km^{2} (0.386 sq mi or 247 acres) and river estuaries.

Génolhac (French pronunciation: [ʒenɔlak]; Occitan: Ginolhac) is a commune in the Gard department in southern France.

== Geography ==
=== Climate ===
Génolhac has a hot-summer Mediterranean climate (Köppen climate classification Csa). The average annual temperature in Génolhac is 13.2 °C (55.8 °F). The average annual rainfall is 1,692.5 mm (66.63 in) with November as the wettest month. The temperatures are highest on average in July, at around 22.4 °C (72.3 °F), and lowest in January, at around 5.3 °C (41.5 °F). The highest temperature ever recorded in Génolhac was 42.3 °C (108.1 °F) on 28 June 2019; the coldest temperature ever recorded was −13.0 °C (8.6 °F) on 12 January 1987.

Climate data for Génolhac (1991−2020 normals, extremes 1974−present)
| Month | Jan | Feb | Mar | Apr | May | Jun | Jul | Aug | Sep | Oct | Nov | Dec | Year |
|---|---|---|---|---|---|---|---|---|---|---|---|---|---|
| Record high °C (°F) | 20.5 (68.9) | 23.5 (74.3) | 26.2 (79.2) | 29.1 (84.4) | 33.0 (91.4) | 42.3 (108.1) | 37.6 (99.7) | 40.2 (104.4) | 35.4 (95.7) | 30.3 (86.5) | 24.2 (75.6) | 21.0 (69.8) | 42.3 (108.1) |
| Mean daily maximum °C (°F) | 8.7 (47.7) | 10.0 (50.0) | 14.0 (57.2) | 16.6 (61.9) | 20.7 (69.3) | 25.1 (77.2) | 28.6 (83.5) | 28.4 (83.1) | 23.1 (73.6) | 17.5 (63.5) | 12.3 (54.1) | 9.4 (48.9) | 17.9 (64.2) |
| Daily mean °C (°F) | 5.3 (41.5) | 6.0 (42.8) | 9.3 (48.7) | 11.8 (53.2) | 15.5 (59.9) | 19.5 (67.1) | 22.4 (72.3) | 22.3 (72.1) | 18.0 (64.4) | 13.5 (56.3) | 8.9 (48.0) | 6.0 (42.8) | 13.2 (55.8) |
| Mean daily minimum °C (°F) | 1.8 (35.2) | 2.0 (35.6) | 4.7 (40.5) | 7.0 (44.6) | 10.3 (50.5) | 13.9 (57.0) | 16.2 (61.2) | 16.2 (61.2) | 12.9 (55.2) | 9.6 (49.3) | 5.5 (41.9) | 2.7 (36.9) | 8.6 (47.5) |
| Record low °C (°F) | −13.0 (8.6) | −11.0 (12.2) | −9.3 (15.3) | −3.5 (25.7) | 1.0 (33.8) | 2.0 (35.6) | 8.0 (46.4) | 7.2 (45.0) | 3.5 (38.3) | −2.0 (28.4) | −5.5 (22.1) | −10.0 (14.0) | −13.0 (8.6) |
| Average precipitation mm (inches) | 141.7 (5.58) | 95.8 (3.77) | 98.7 (3.89) | 142.8 (5.62) | 141.9 (5.59) | 77.0 (3.03) | 45.9 (1.81) | 78.8 (3.10) | 180.6 (7.11) | 247.5 (9.74) | 277.0 (10.91) | 164.8 (6.49) | 1,692.5 (66.63) |
| Average precipitation days (≥ 1.0 mm) | 9.2 | 6.8 | 6.7 | 8.6 | 8.8 | 6.2 | 5.2 | 6.1 | 6.9 | 10.9 | 10.4 | 9.5 | 95.2 |
Source: Météo-France

== Population ==
Historical population
| Year | Pop. | ±% p.a. |
|---|---|---|
| 1968 | 920 | — |
| 1975 | 936 | +0.25% |
| 1982 | 825 | −1.79% |
| 1990 | 827 | +0.03% |
| 1999 | 840 | +0.17% |
| 2007 | 890 | +0.73% |
| 2012 | 854 | −0.82% |
| 2017 | 841 | −0.31% |
| 2023 | 815 | −0.52% |
Source: INSEE

== See also ==
- Communes of the Gard department
