= Chamborigaud =

Commune in Occitanie, France

- Commune
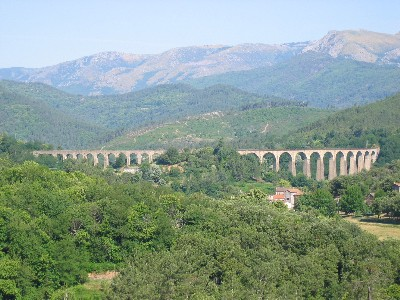
- Viaduct of Chamborigaud, with Mont Lozère in the background

- Coat of arms
- Location of Chamborigaud
- Location within France Location within Occitanie
- Coordinates: 44°18′07″N 3°58′43″E
- Country: France
- Region: Occitania
- Department: Gard
- Arrondissement: Alès
- Canton: La Grand-Combe
- Intercommunality: Alès Agglomération

Government
  - Mayor (2020–2026): Émile Corbier
- Area^{1}: 17.86 km^{2} (6.90 sq mi)
- Elevation: 329 m (1,079 ft)
- Highest elevation: 887 m (2,910 ft)
- Lowest elevation: 259 m (850 ft)
- Population (2023): 884
  - Density: 49.5/km^{2} (128/sq mi)
- Time zone: UTC+01:00 (CET)
  - Summer (DST): UTC+02:00 (CEST)
- INSEE/Postal code: 30080 /30530
- ^{1} French Land Register data, which excludes lakes, ponds, glaciers > 1 km^{2} (0.386 sq mi or 247 acres) and river estuaries.

Chamborigaud (French pronunciation: [ʃɑ̃bɔʁiɡo]; Occitan: Chambonrigaud) is a commune in the Gard department in southern France.

The village is known for its stunning railway viaduct, designed by Charles Dombre, the construction of which ended in 1867. Unlike most other bridges of this type, the curve of the Viaduct of Chamborigaud faces upstream.

The road bridge crossing Luech river has collapsed in March 2024. One of the bridge's arches collapsed under the weight of a street-sweeper lorry. Road D906 between Langogne and Alès was left interrupted, which could have damaged the tourism industry in and around Chamborigaud. A temporary bridge has been installed downstream of the collapsed bridge and was opened in May 2024.

== Population ==
Historical population
Year	Pop.	±% p.a.
1968	1,083	—
1975	869	−3.10%
1982	872	+0.05%
1990	716	−2.43%
1999	731	+0.23%
2007	755	+0.40%
2012	807	+1.34%
2017	852	+1.09%
2023	884	+0.62%
Source: INSEE

== See also ==
- Communes of the Gard department
