= Laval-Pradel =

- Commune
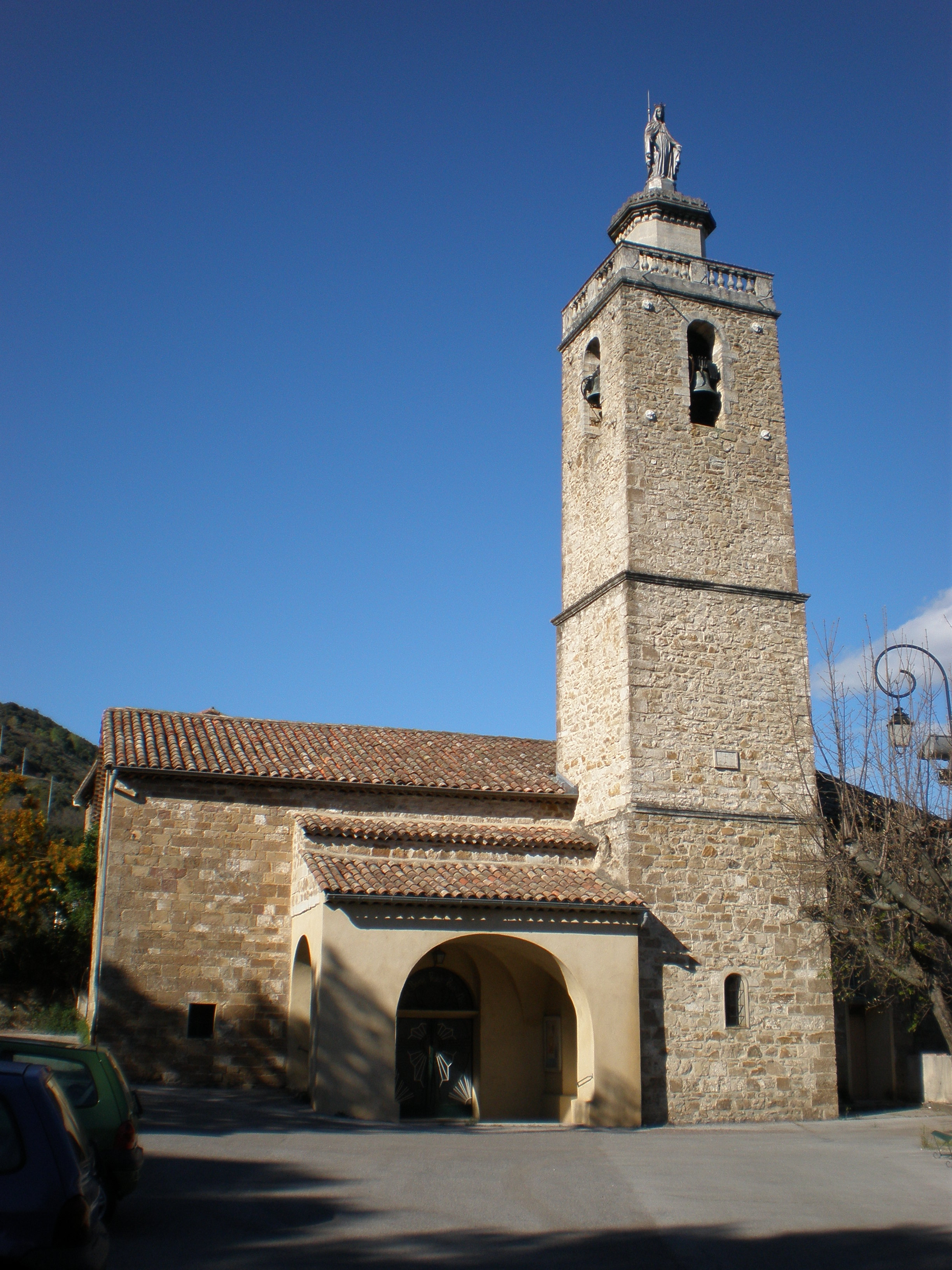
- The church of Laval-Pradel

- Coat of arms
- Location of Laval-Pradel
- Location within France Location within Occitanie
- Coordinates: 44°12′27″N 4°03′56″E
- Country: France
- Region: Occitania
- Department: Gard
- Arrondissement: Alès
- Canton: La Grand-Combe
- Intercommunality: Alès Agglomération

Government
  - Mayor (2020–2026): Joseph Barba
- Area^{1}: 9 km^{2} (3.5 sq mi)
- Elevation: 90 m (300 ft)
- Highest elevation: 165 m (541 ft)
- Lowest elevation: 48 m (157 ft)
- Population (2023): 1,125
  - Density: 120/km^{2} (320/sq mi)
- Time zone: UTC+01:00 (CET)
  - Summer (DST): UTC+02:00 (CEST)
- INSEE/Postal code: 30142 /30110
- ^{1} French Land Register data, which excludes lakes, ponds, glaciers > 1 km^{2} (0.386 sq mi or 247 acres) and river estuaries.

Laval-Pradel (French pronunciation: [laval pʁadɛl]; Occitan: La Val) is a commune in the Gard department in southern France.

== Population ==
Historical population
Year	Pop.	±% p.a.
1968	1,743	—
1975	1,218	−4.99%
1982	1,166	−0.62%
1990	1,026	−1.59%
1999	1,033	+0.08%
2007	1,110	+0.90%
2012	1,188	+1.37%
2017	1,161	−0.46%
2023	1,125	−0.52%
Source: INSEE

== See also ==
- Communes of the Gard department
