= Canton of La Grand-Combe =

Coordinates: 44.21°N 4.03°E

The canton of La Grand-Combe is an administrative division of the Gard department, southern France. Its borders were modified at the French canton reorganisation which came into effect in March 2015. Its seat is in La Grand-Combe.

It consists of the following communes:

1. Aujac
2. Bonnevaux
3. Branoux-les-Taillades
4. Cendras
5. Chambon
6. Chamborigaud
7. Concoules
8. Génolhac
9. La Grand-Combe
10. Lamelouze
11. Laval-Pradel
12. Malons-et-Elze
13. Mialet
14. Ponteils-et-Brésis
15. Portes
16. Saint-Bonnet-de-Salendrinque
17. Sainte-Cécile-d'Andorge
18. Sainte-Croix-de-Caderle
19. Saint-Jean-du-Gard
20. Saint-Paul-la-Coste
21. Saint-Sébastien-d'Aigrefeuille
22. Les Salles-du-Gardon
23. Sénéchas
24. Soustelle
25. Thoiras-Corbès
26. Vabres
27. La Vernarède
