= Charles-Roux =

Charles-Roux may refer to:

== People with the surname ==
- Edmonde Charles-Roux (1920–2016), French writer.
- François Charles-Roux (1879–1961), French businessman and diplomat.
- Jules Charles-Roux (1841–1918), French businessman and politician.
- Claire Charles-Roux (1908–1992), French Resistance during World War II.
