= Museon Arlaten =

Ethnographic museum in Arles, Provence, France

Coordinates: 43.676567°N 4.625923°E

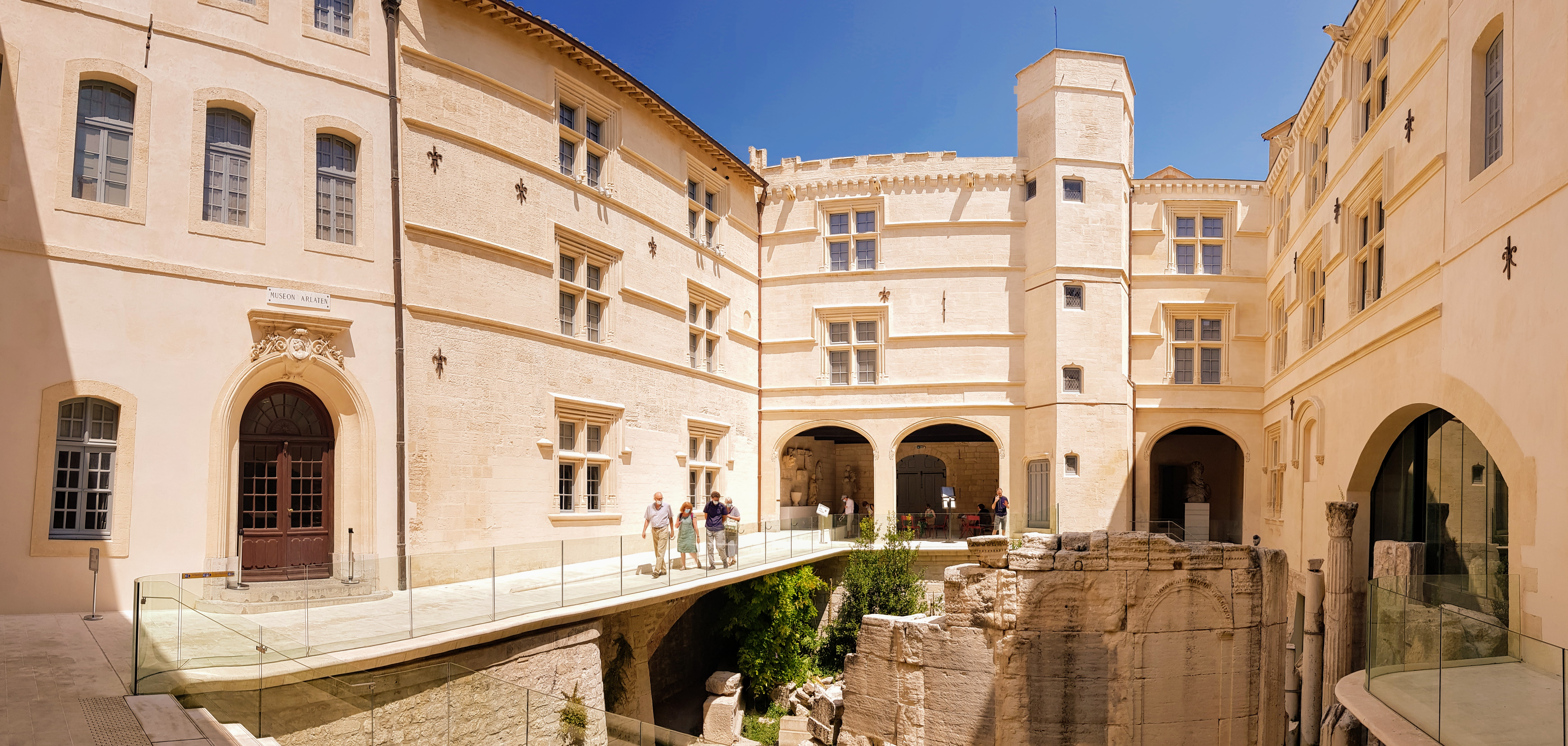
Courtyard of Museon Arlaten.

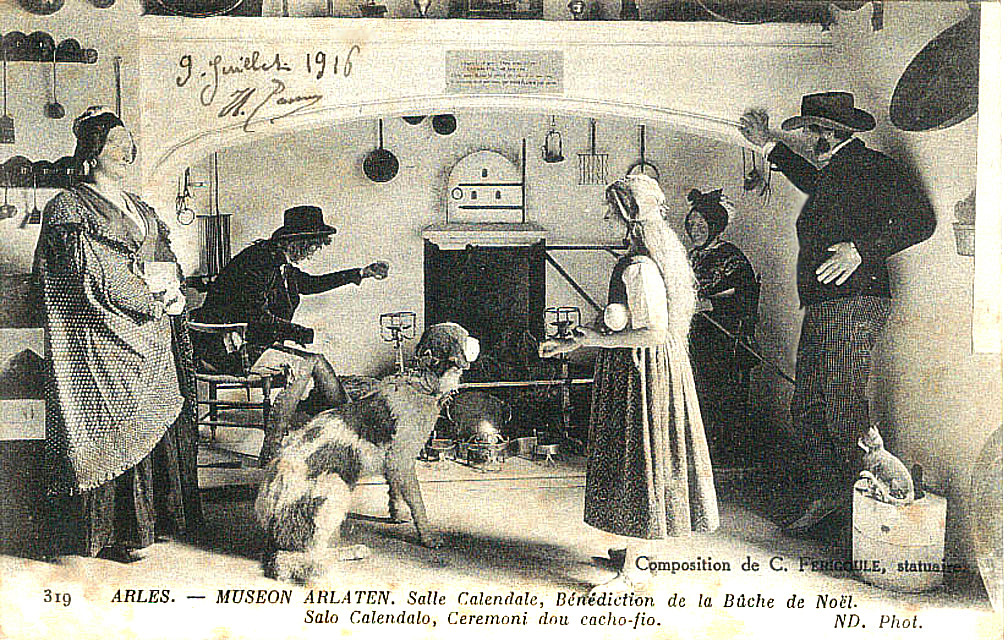
1916 postcard of exhibits within Museon Arlaten.

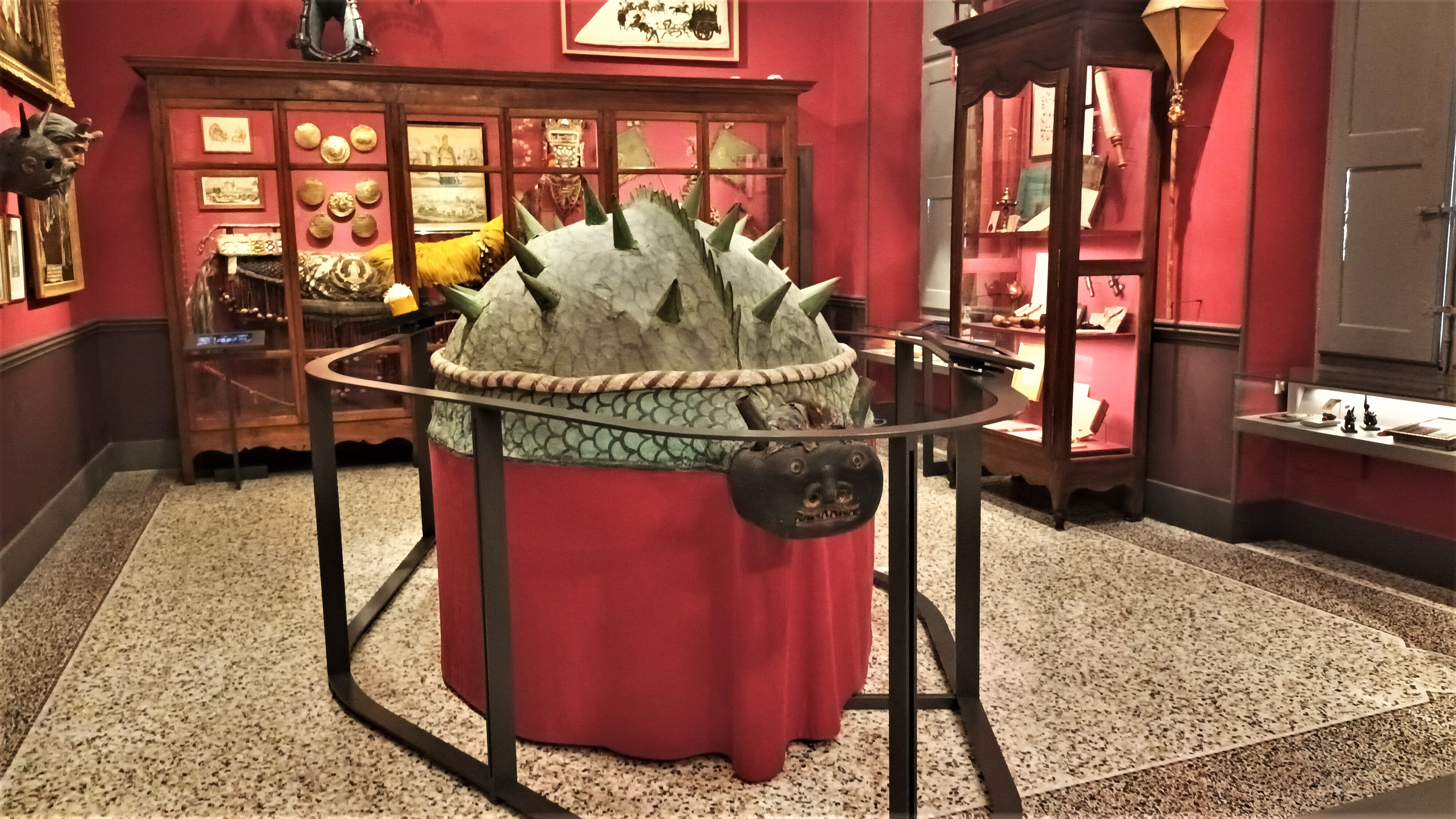
Room salo festadiero of Museon Arlaten, featuring an old processional effigy of the Tarasque.

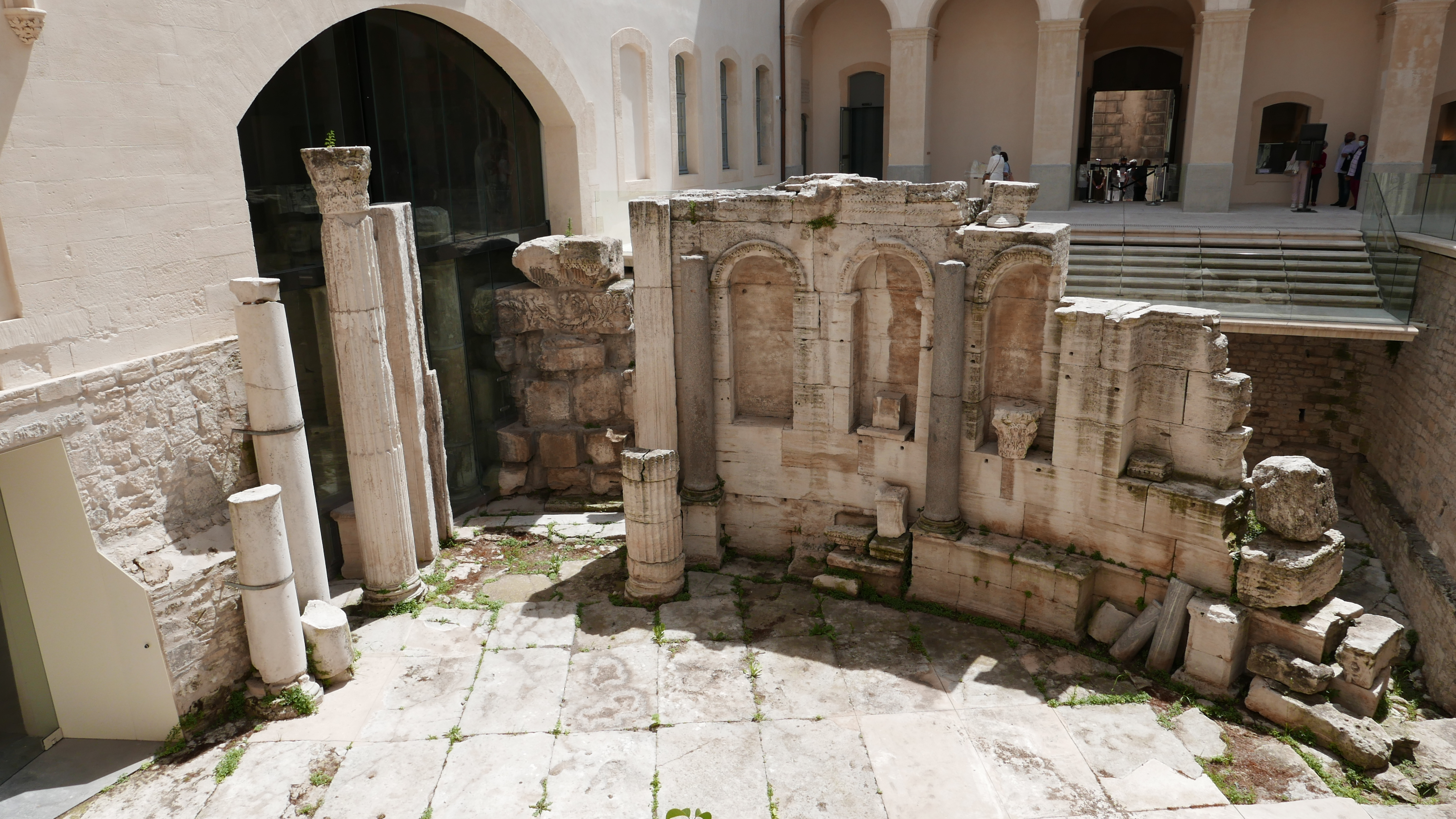
Roman exedra of the former forum of Arles in the courtyard of the Museum.

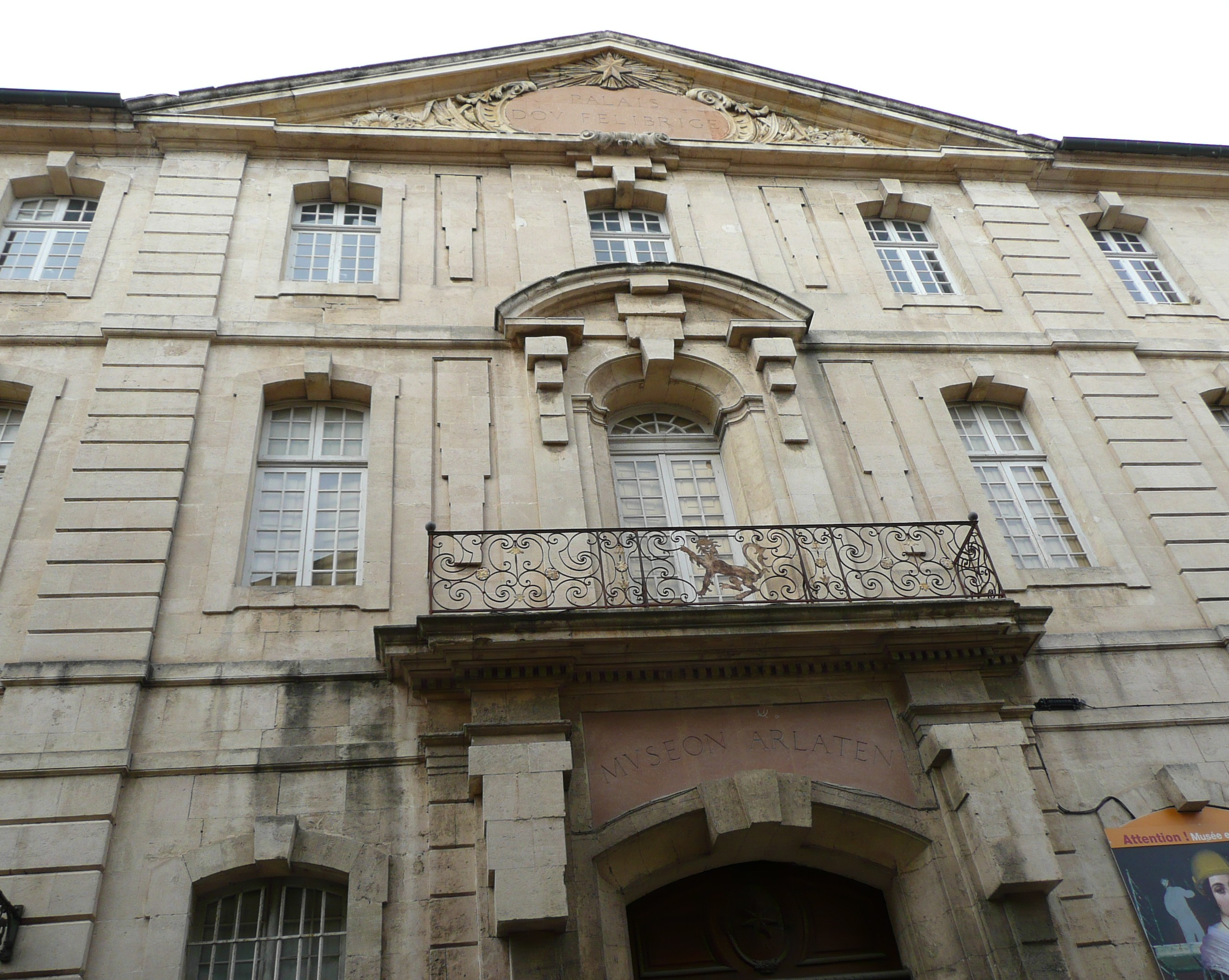
Facade of the Museum in Rue de la République.

Museon Arlaten ("Arles Museum" in Provençal dialect of Occitan) is a museum dedicated to the ethnography of Provence. It is located in Arles, at 29, rue de la République, and it is housed in the 15th century hôtel particulier Laval-Castellane, now a monument historique.

== History ==
The museum was founded by Provençal poet Frédéric Mistral and opened in 1899. With the help of Jules Charles-Roux and Jeanne de Flandreysy, he established a gallery with statues from the Antiquity found on the grounds of the museum. Mistral had worked to build a Provençal literary revival since the 1850s, but in 1896 he declared that he wished to create a more enduring statement of Provençal tradition by building a "Pantheon of Provence" that would bring together "all the memories of our race." It sought to become "the museum of the region, the complete representation of a pays." Much of the collection focused on the traditional clothing of Arlesienne women, but it collected widely. Originally, labels were in Provençal, well after that language had ceased to dominate the region. In his history of the region, Marseillais business-man, politician and historian Jules Charles-Roux explained the museum's choice of language: "Provençal is the language of a free people. And it is this love of humble people, this profound sense of equality, this respect for the spirit of the people, this magnificent understanding of its greatness that motivated Mistral to build a museum to house all the modest objects of daily life,... a museum for everything that makes up the originality, the flavor of Provençal life."

In 1903, Mistral and the Museon Arlaten organized the first "Fèsto Vierginenco," where 28 young women of Arles pledged to wear the clothing that had become the identifiable "traditional costume" of the city. The event was so popular that in subsequent years it had to be moved to the Roman Theatre.

The museum was closed for repair works in October 25, 2009. Its reopening, initially planned for 2015, was later postponed to winter 2020/21. It reopened on May 19, 2021.

== Collections ==
The museum has an important collection of Provençal folk art, displaying furniture, costumes, ceramics, tools and farming implements.

== See also ==
- Musée de l'Arles et de la Provence antiques
- Musée Réattu
- List of Jesuit sites
