= Jeanne de Flandreysy =

French author and literary critic

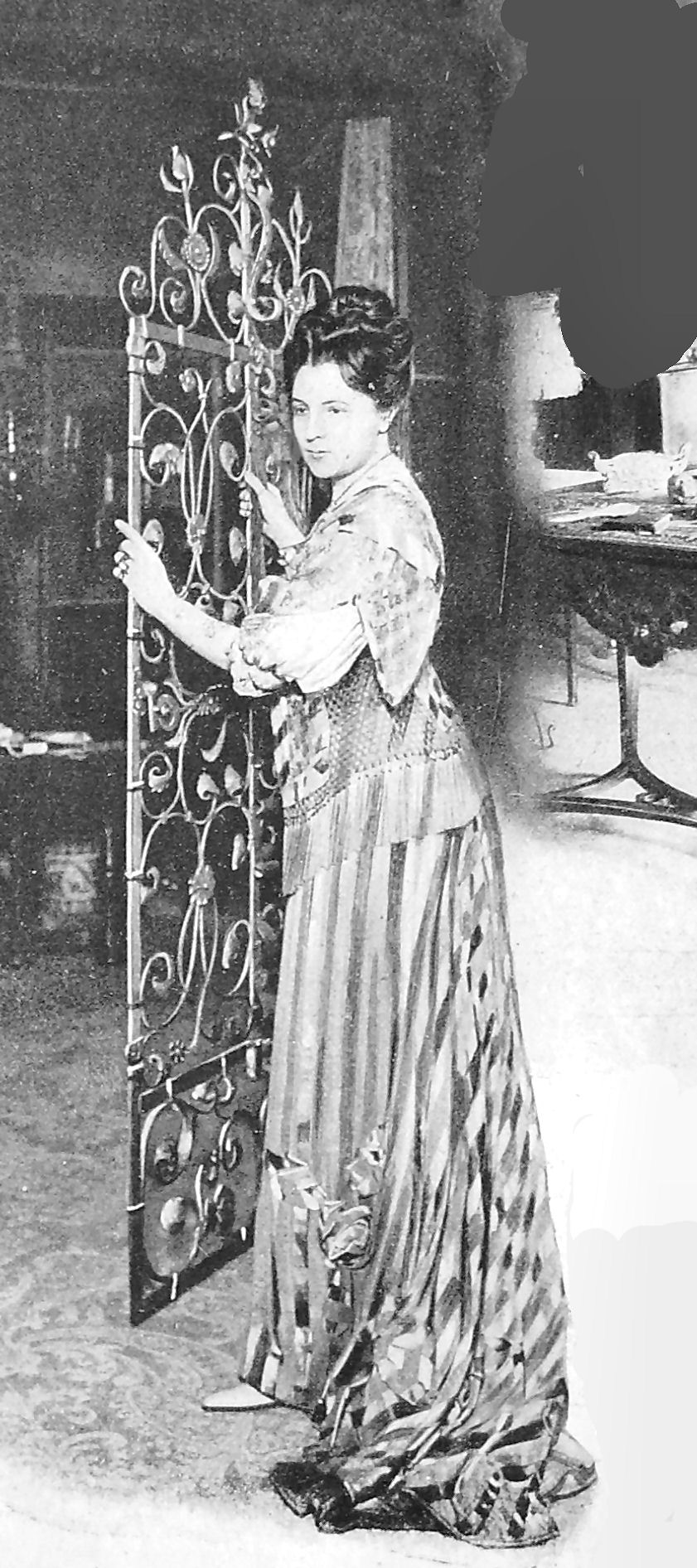
- Jeanne de Flandreysy in 1909
- Born: Jeanne Mellier; 11 July 1874; Valence, France
- Died: 15 May 1959 (aged 84); Avignon, France
- Occupations: Author, critic
- Spouse: Émile Espérandieu
- Parent: Étienne Mellier

Jeanne de Flandreysy, born Jeanne Mellier (11 July 1874 – 15 May 1959) was a French author and literary critic. She was the author of many books about Provence, and she promoted Franco-Italian cultural exchanges.

== Early life ==
Jeanne de Flandreysy began her literary and journalistic career at a very young age. Born into a well-established family from the Drôme region, she developed an interest in Provençal culture alongside her father, the archaeologist Étienne Mellier, and her mother, Marie-Louise de Ladreyt, and wrote several books on the region. At the time, women had no rights, unless they were widows so, in 1899, she invented a marriage to a Scottish gentleman of French origin, Aymar de Flandreysy, which quickly resulted in her being widowed as a result of a hunting accident (or a shipwreck, according to other sources).

== Career ==
As a "widow", de Flandreysy began her career as a contributor to La Revue Dauphinoise. She was a literary critic for Le Figaro from 1904 to 1910.

De Flandreysy was an author. She was close to the Félibrige, and some of her books were prefaced by them. For example, her 1903 book entitled La Vénus d'Arles et le Museon Arlaten was prefaced by Frédéric Mistral, while her 1924 book entitled La maison de Baroncelli en Italie du Xe au XVe siècle was prefaced by Charles Maurras. Meanwhile, her 1943 poetry collection was prefaced by Folco de Baroncelli-Javon. In 1958, she translated poems in Provençal about Saintes-Maries-de-la-Mer composed by Baroncelli-Javon and Mistral into French.

De Flandreysy was a significant collector of books and manuscripts about Provence and Italy. She was a member of the Comité France-Italie. With Jules Charles-Roux, she helped Frédéric Mistral establish a gallery with statues from the Antiquity found on the grounds of the Museon Arlaten. She was also the co-founder of the Musée-bibliothèque François Pétrarque in Fontaine-de-Vaucluse in 1927.

De Flandreysy became a Knight of the Legion of Honour in 1953.

== Personal life ==
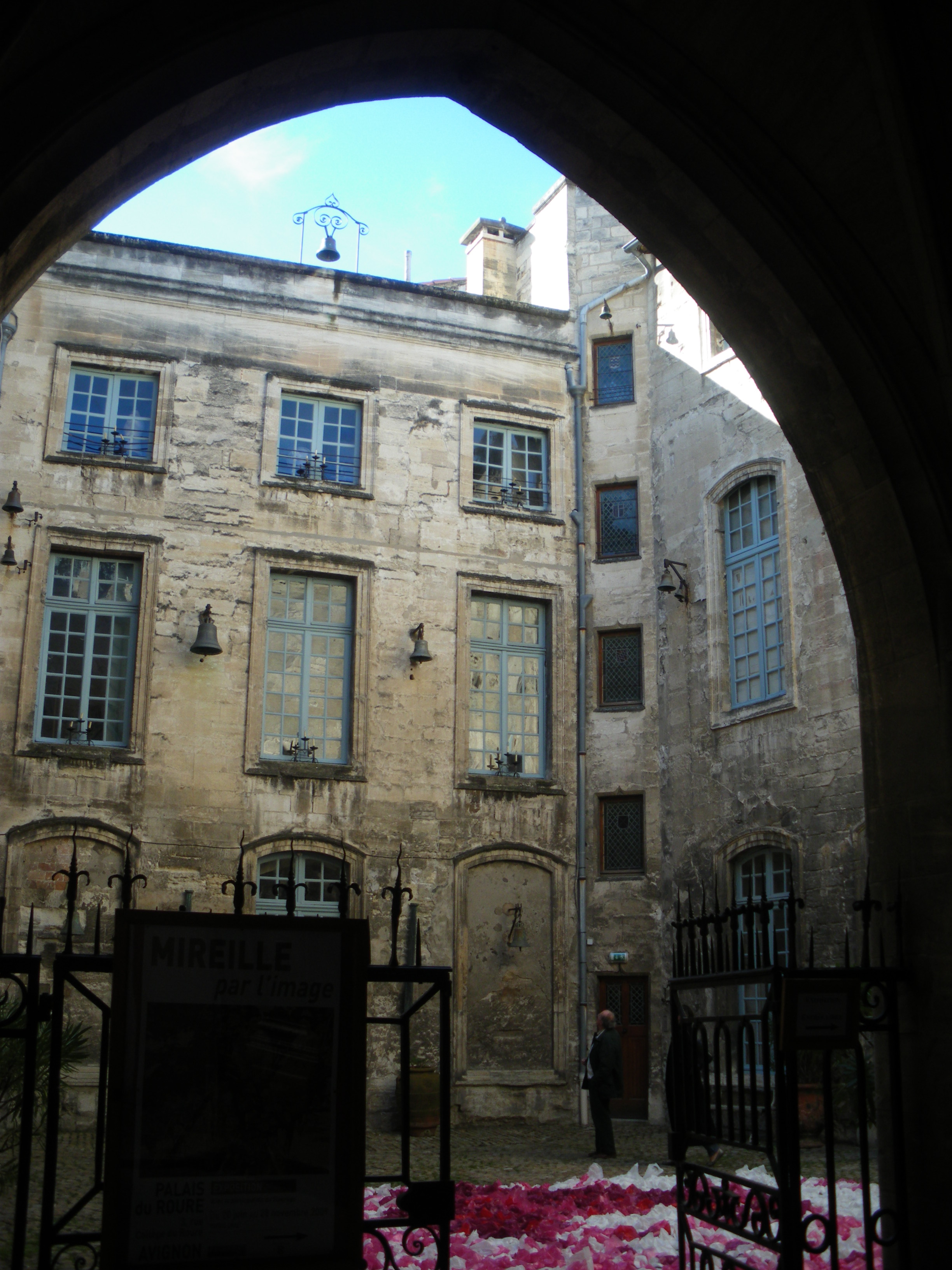
Palais du Roure.

De Flandreysy purchased the Palais du Roure, a hôtel particulier in Avignon in 1918. Having met Benito Mussolini twice, she hung his portrait above the chimney in her lounge.

De Flandreysy married Émile Espérandieu, an archaeologist and epigrapher, on 8 September 1936.

== Death and legacy ==
De Flandreysy died on 15 May 1959 in Avignon.

De Flandreysy bequeathed her Palais du Roure to the town of Avignon; it was renamed the Institut méditerranéen du palais du Roure, run by Aix-Marseille University.

The Espace Jeanne de Flandreysy in Valence was named in her honour.

== Works ==
- De Flandreysy, Jeanne (1901). La gravure. Les graveurs dauphinois. Grenoble. OCLC 421074888.
- De Flandreysy, Jeanne (1903). La Vénus d'Arles et le Museon Arlaten. Paris: Alphonse Lemerre. OCLC 489927124.
- De Flandreysy, Jeanne (1903). Femmes et déesses. Paris: Société d'édition littéraire et artiste. OCLC 421840759.
- De Flandreysy, Jeanne (1904). Vers le beau. Paris. OCLC 421078345.
- De Flandreysy, Jeanne (1905). L'Art de voyager. Paris: Alphonse Lemerre. OCLC 458027927.
- De Flandreysy, Jeanne (1906). Les Vénus Gréco-Romaines de la Vallée du Rhône. Valence: Jules Céas & fils. OCLC 19745953.
- De Flandreysy, Jeanne (1907). Essai sur la femme et l'amour dans la littérature française au XIXe siècle. Paris: Librairie Nilsson. OCLC 489872240.
- De Flandreysy, Jeanne (1910). Valence: son histoire, ses richesses d'art son lívre d'or. Paris: Alphonse Lemerre. OCLC 1970578.
- De Flandreysy, Jeanne (1912). La Provence : au pays d'Arles. Marseille: Boissonnas et Detaille. OCLC 10497852.
- De Flandreysy, Jeanne; Charles-Roux, Jules; Mellier, Etienne (1916). Livre d'or de la Camargue. Paris: Alphonse Lemerre. OCLC 317695961.
- De Flandreysy, Jeanne (1922). Arles et l'abbaye de Montmajour. Marseille: F. Detaille. OCLC 4326937.
- De Flandreysy, Jeanne (1922). La femme provençale. Marseille: F. Detaille. OCLC 11927522.
- De Flandreysy, Jeanne (1924). La maison de Baroncelli en Italie du Xe au XVe siècle. Avignon: Éditions du Palais du Roure. OCLC 82491607.
- De Flandreysy, Jeanne (1925). Le taureau Camargue. Paris: Editions du cadran. OCLC 902561730.
- De Flandreysy, Jeanne (1943). Poèmes. Paris: Alphonse Lemerre. OCLC 799723815.
- De Flandreysy, Jeanne (1958). Les Saintes Maries de la Mer. Ex-voto, avec un poème liminaire de Folco de Baroncelli et quelques vers de Frédéric Mistral. Avignon: La Chèvre d'Or. OCLC 742891316.
- De Flandreysy, Jeanne (1958). La mère de Mistral. Avignon: Palais du Roure. OCLC 742849891.

=== Posthumously ===
- De Baroncelli, Folco; De Flandreysy, Jeanne (2013). Le crépuscule du marquis, 1942-1943 : Folco de Baroncelli et Jeanne de Flandreysy, une année de correspondance. Avignon: Palais du Roure. ISBN 9782954692111. OCLC 887508462.
