= Émile Espérandieu =

French military officer, Latin epigrapher and archaeologist

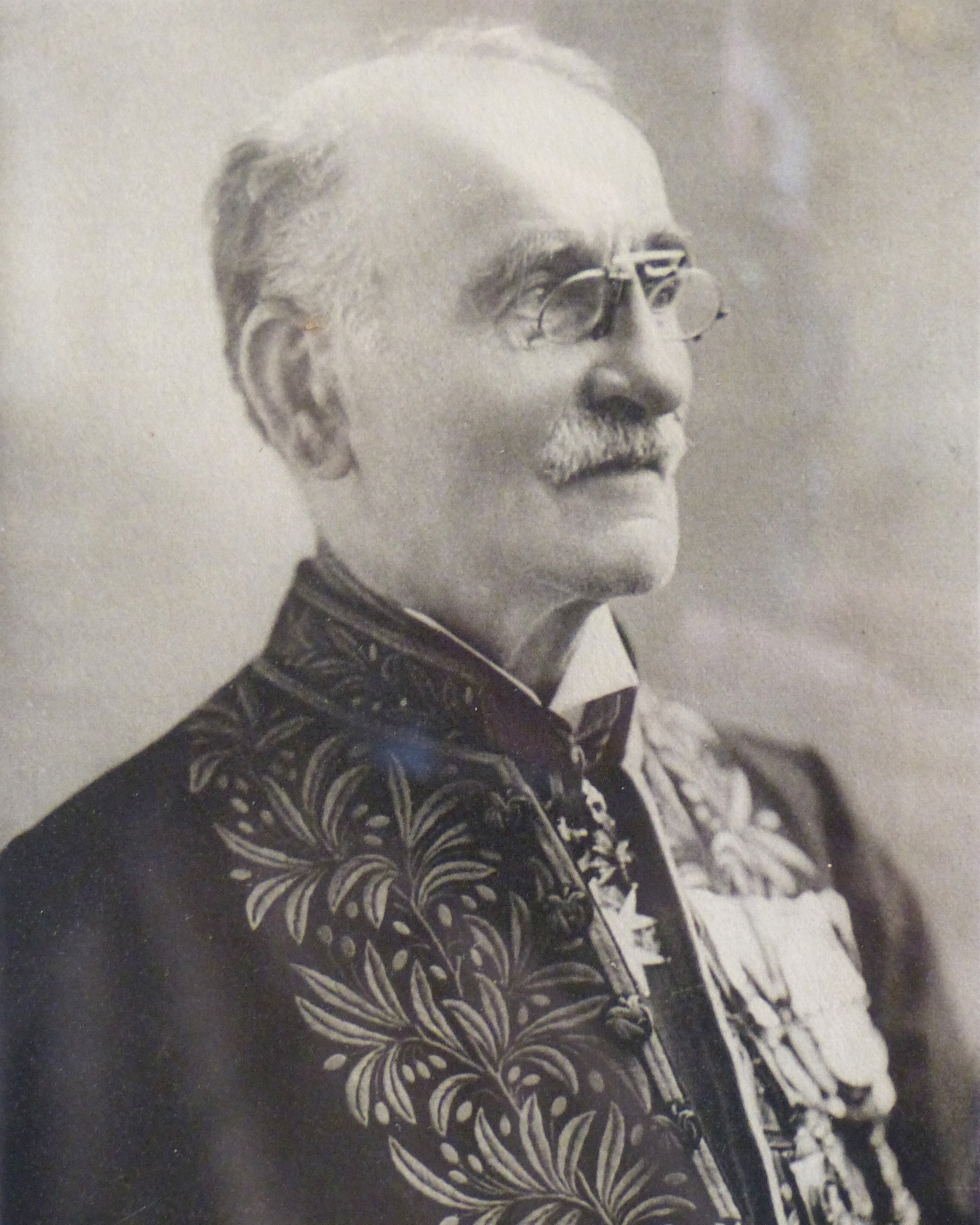
- Born: 11 November 1857; Saint-Hippolyte-de-Caton (Gard)
- Died: 14 March 1939 (aged 81); Avignon
- Occupation(s): Military; Archaeologist; Epigrapher
- Spouse: Jeanne de Flandreysy

Émile Espérandieu (11 November 1857 – 14 March 1939) was a French military officer, Latin epigrapher and archaeologist.

== Biography ==
A pupil of the École spéciale militaire de Saint-Cyr then a career soldier, Émile Espérandieu participated in the 1880–1881 campaign in Tunisia where he lived thereafter. In this country, he discovered historical epigraphy during his leisure and began in 1883 to write historical and archaeological communications. On his appointment as assistant professor at the military school of Saint-Maixent in 1886, he turned his epigraphist activity towards Gaul inscriptions and inventoried in 1893 the inscriptions of Corsica. In 1899 he became director of the Revue épigraphique.

In 1905 the Committee on Museums entrusted him with the development and publication of a General Collection of reliefs of Roman Gaul, an endeavour that eventually became a monumental work in nine volumes, the Recueil général des bas-reliefs, statues et bustes de la Gaule romaine.

It is also from 1905 that he led the excavations at Mont Auxois on the site of the Battle of Alesia where he regularly intervened as far as the 1930s.

Appointed a battalion commander in 1905, however, he saw his military career quickly hampered by early deafness and placed senior in 1910. This did not hinder his archaeologist vocation. After participating in World War I, he returned to his historical and archaeological studies. Director, co-editor of journals and curator of Roman monuments and archaeological museums in Nimes where he retired in 1918, Émile Espérandieu was elected a member of the Académie des Inscriptions et Belles-Lettres in 1919.

In 1929, he published the catalog of the Inscriptions latines de Gaule narbonnaise (ILGN), which was an update of Volume XII of Corpus inscriptionum latinarum and a summary of his epigraphic research work.

From 1908 to 1938, he continued the inventory and publication of his masterpiece, the Recueil général des bas-reliefs, statues et bustes de la Gaule romaine in eleven volumes, or 7818 notices. The work makes reference to the point of being commonly called "the Espérandieu". In 1931, he added the Recueil général des bas-reliefs statues et bustes de la Germanie romane to the volumes devoted to Gaul.

In 1936, he married Jeanne de Flandreysy, a woman of letters, and spent his last years in Avignon at the palais du Roure. He published the eleventh volume of his general collection in 1938, one year before his death.

== Publications (selection) ==
- Inscriptions latines de Gaule (Narbonnaise), E. Leroux, Paris, 1929
- Recueil général des bas-reliefs, statues et bustes de la Gaule romaine (1907-1938) vols. 1, 2, 3, 4, 5, 6, 7,8, 9, 10, 11, 13, 15
- Recueil général des bas-reliefs, statues et bustes de la Gaule romaine. 2° edition, New Jersey, 1965-1956

== Bibliography ==
- Charles Picard, « Éloge funèbre de M. Emile Espérandieu, membre libre de l'académie », CRAI, 1939, 83-2, p. 161-172 Read online.
- H. Rolland, "Bibliographie d'Emile Esperandieu membre de l'institut 1883-1936" avant-propos by Augustin Fliche / Paris - les Belles Lettres 1937 - 124 pages

=== External links ===
- Biographie d'Émile Espérandieu sur le site nemausensis
- Commentaires sur le tome VII, Gaule germanique, de l’ouvrage d’Émile Espérandieu : Recueil général des bas-reliefs statues et bustes de la Gaule romaine.*
