= Tillett =

Tillett or Tillet may refer to:

- Tillett (surname)
- Ibbs and Tillett, a 20th-century UK classical music promotion agency
- Tillett Islands in Antarctica
- Hôtel du Tillet de la Bussière in Paris, France
- Mason–Tillett House in Virginia, U.S.
