= Ledge of President John Fitzgerald Kennedy =

Street in Marseille

Coordinates: 43.277306°N 5.356611°E

Ledge of President John Fitzgerald Kennedy Corniche du président-John-Fitzgerald-Kennedy
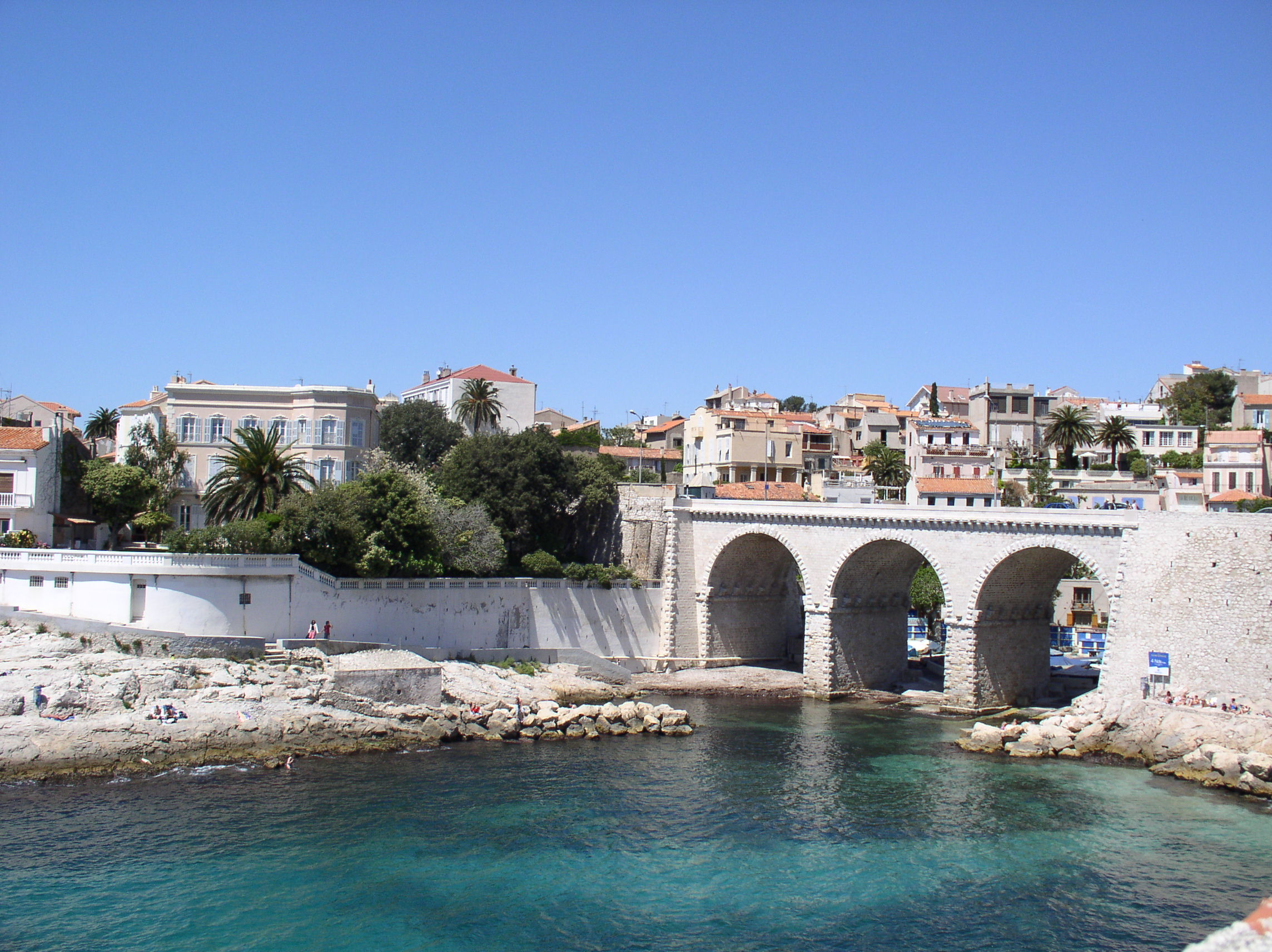
- La Corniche on the Pont de la Fausse Monnaie (Counterfeit Money Bridge), northwest of the Villa Valmer
- Interactive map of Ledge of President John Fitzgerald Kennedy
- Country: France
- City: Marseille
- Arrondissement: 7th

The Ledge of President John Fitzgerald Kennedy (French: Corniche du président-John-Fitzgerald-Kennedy; locally dubbed La Corniche) is a street in the 7th arrondissement of Marseille, France. It runs along the Mediterranean coast from the beach at Les Catalans in the city centre to Promenade Georges Pompidou and the Plages du Prado in the south, at the limit with the 8th arrondissement. It was named after US President John Fitzgerald Kennedy the year of his assassination, in 1963.

== Description ==
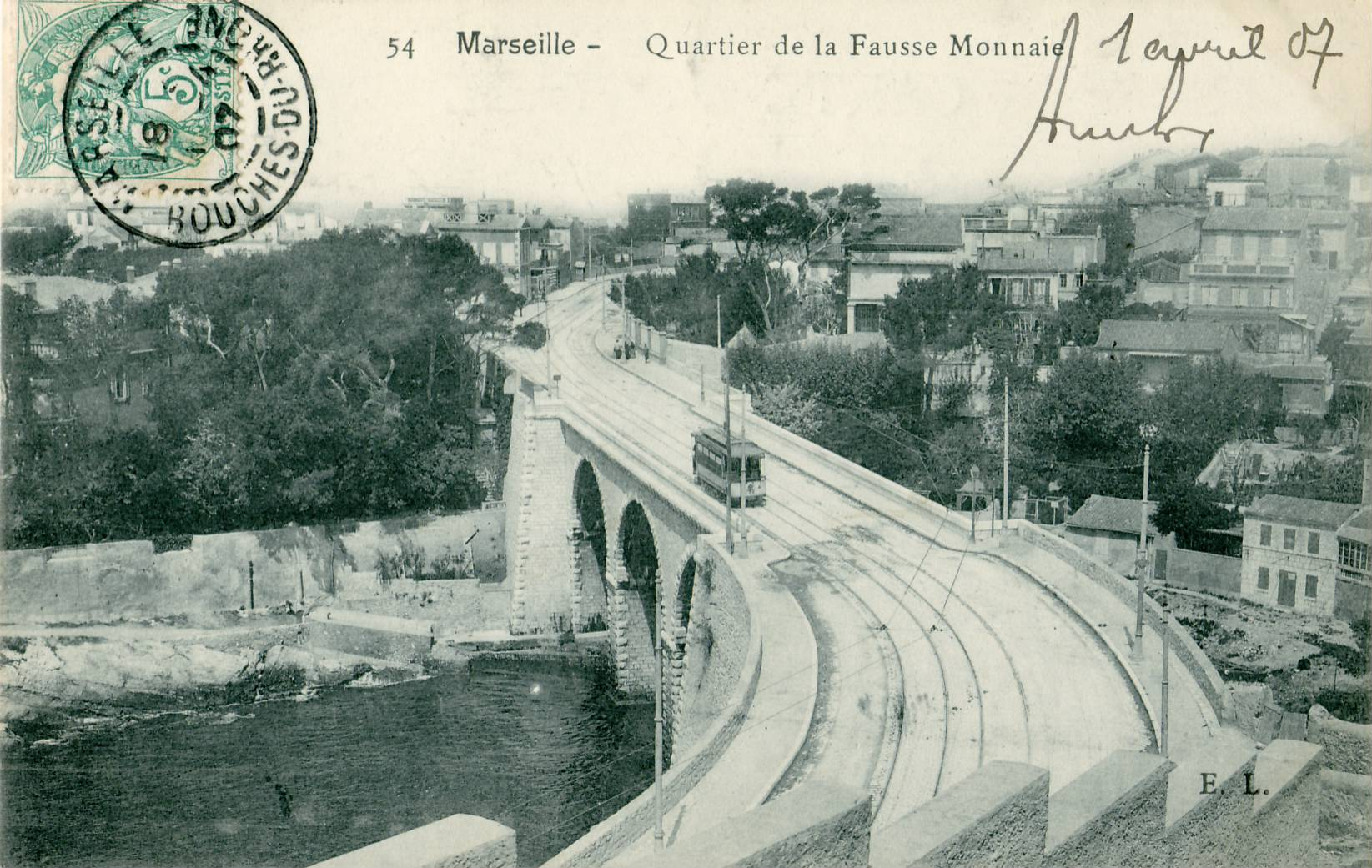
Old tram at Fausse Monnaie

Starting as a simple path created between 1848 and 1863, the Corniche was later developed into an actual road from 1954 to 1968, when the municipal executive led by Mayor Gaston Defferre decided to expand it. Plans for a tram line, which were first presented in the late 19th century, were rapidly realised, although it was later disbanded to create space for the automobile.

It overlooks the Mediterranean and its islands, amongst others the Frioul archipelago. Along it are fishermen's barracks, 19th century villas (most notably the Villa Valmer and its public park), hotels, restaurants (including Le Petit Nice of chef Gérald Passédat), bars and beaches (Plage du Prophète being one of the best known). The Corniche also passes over the Vallon des Auffes and its adjacent Monument aux Morts de l'Armée d'Orient, as well as the Anse de la Fausse Monnaie (Counterfeit Money Cove). As the origin of this name remains unknown, it is used in local tales to embellish the story of the area.

On the sea side of the Corniche Kennedy is a bench running nearly its entire 3 km (1.9 mi) length, with almost no interruption; this made people from Marseille dub it the "longest bench in the world". Despite it being forbidden to jump into the sea from the Corniche, it is a popular activity for local residents.

== In popular culture ==
The boardwalk serves as a meeting place for teenagers in the novel Corniche Kennedy by Maylis de Kerangal. In 2016, the novel was given a film adaptation by the director Dominique Cabrera in an eponym movie. The Corniche can also be seen in the 2014 film The Connection by director Cédric Jimenez. In Creation Lake: A Novel by Rachel Kushner, the narrator states, "Our hotel, The Richelieu, was not a luxury establishment but happened to be, unlike all the other hotels in this part of Marseille, on the correct side of the Corniche—the waterfront side."

== Gallery ==
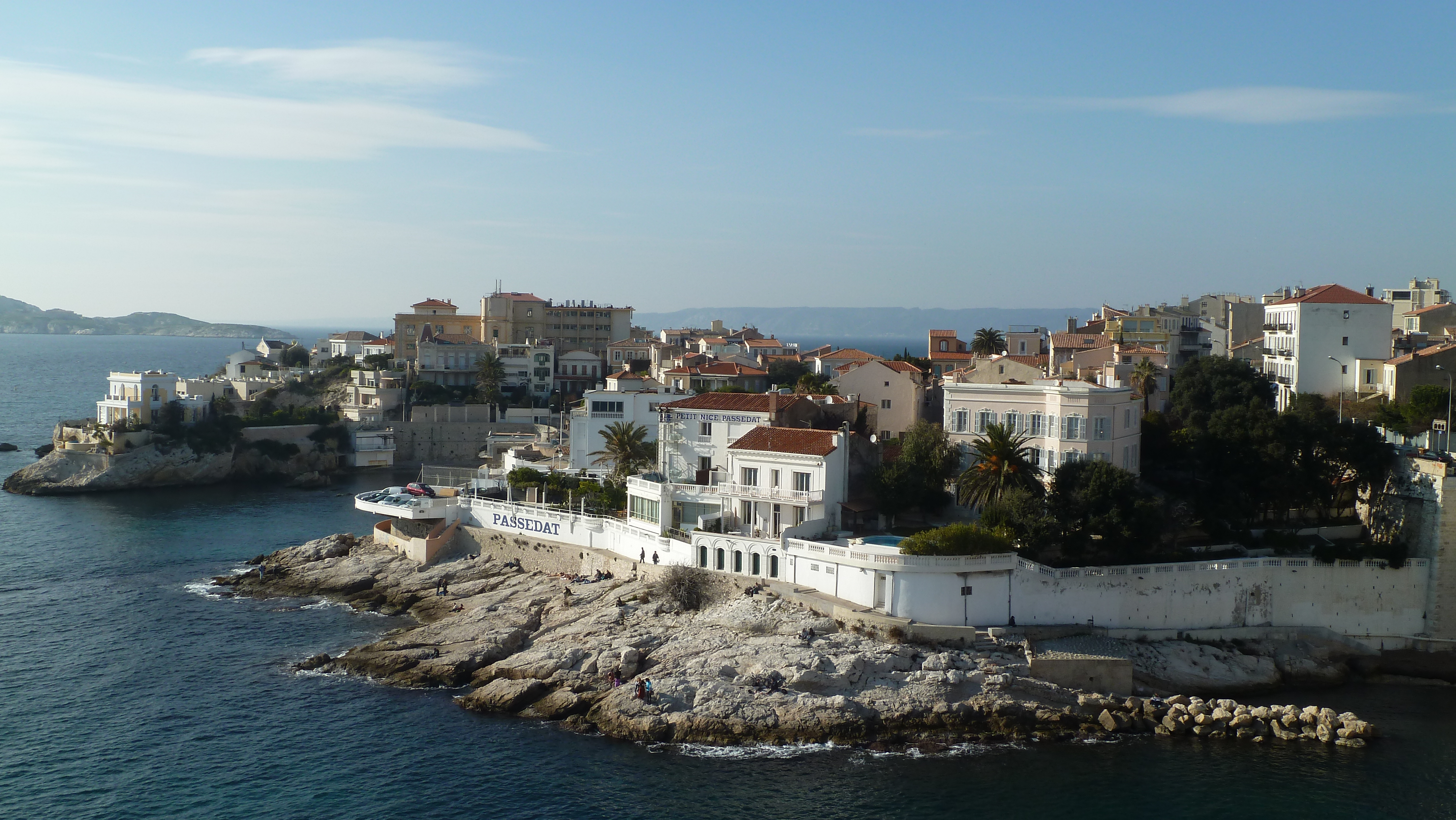
Le Petit Nice

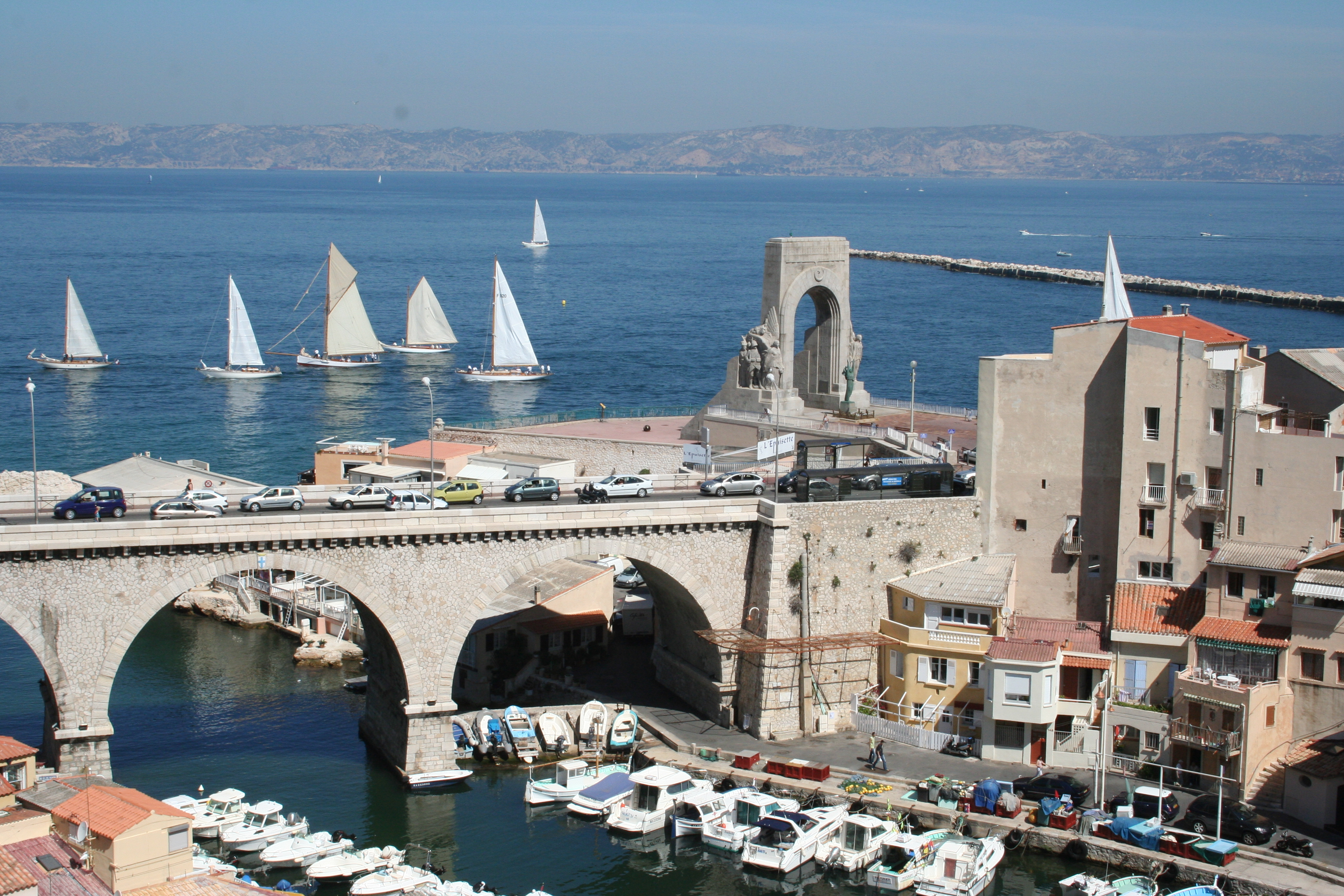
Vallon des Auffes and Monument aux Morts des Armées d'Orient

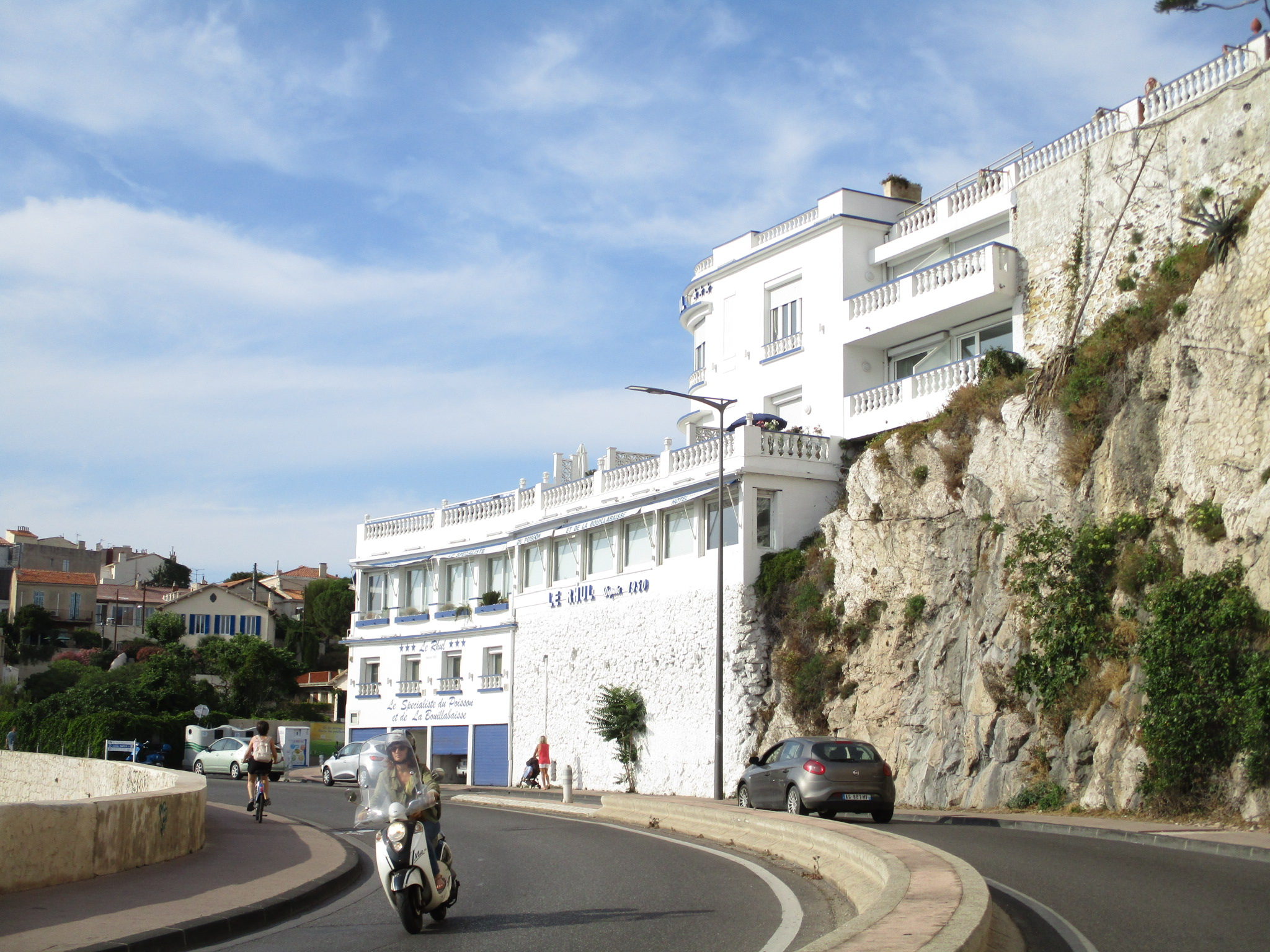
Le Rhul restaurant

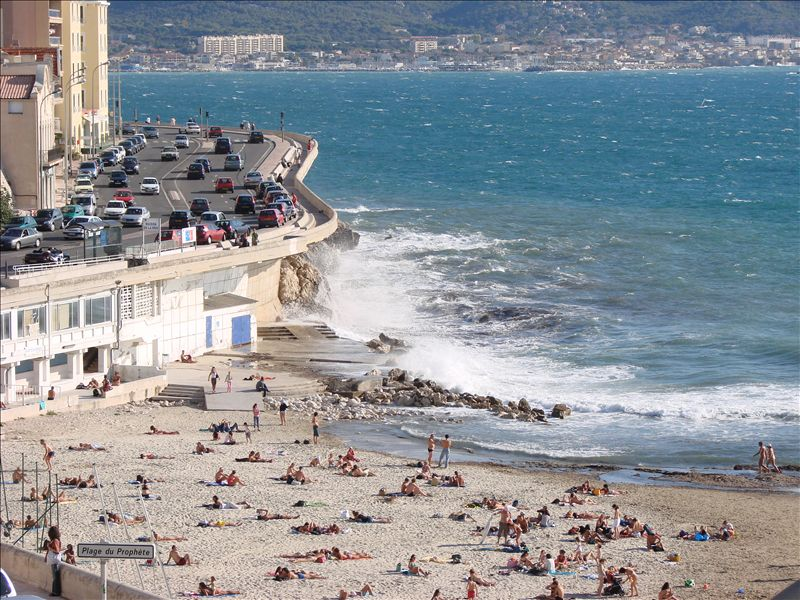
Plage du Prophète

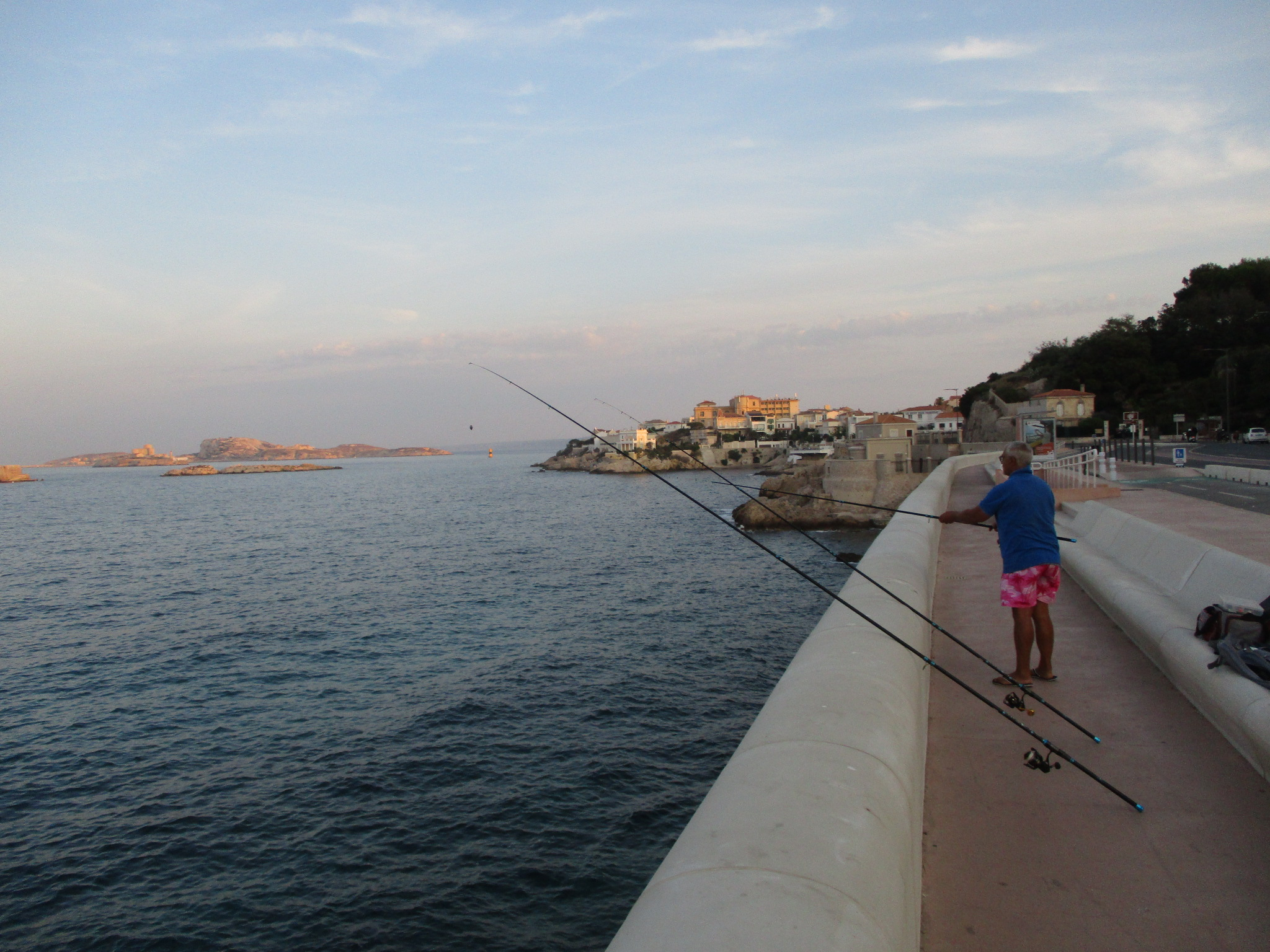
Fishermen on the Corniche with the Frioul archipelago in the distance

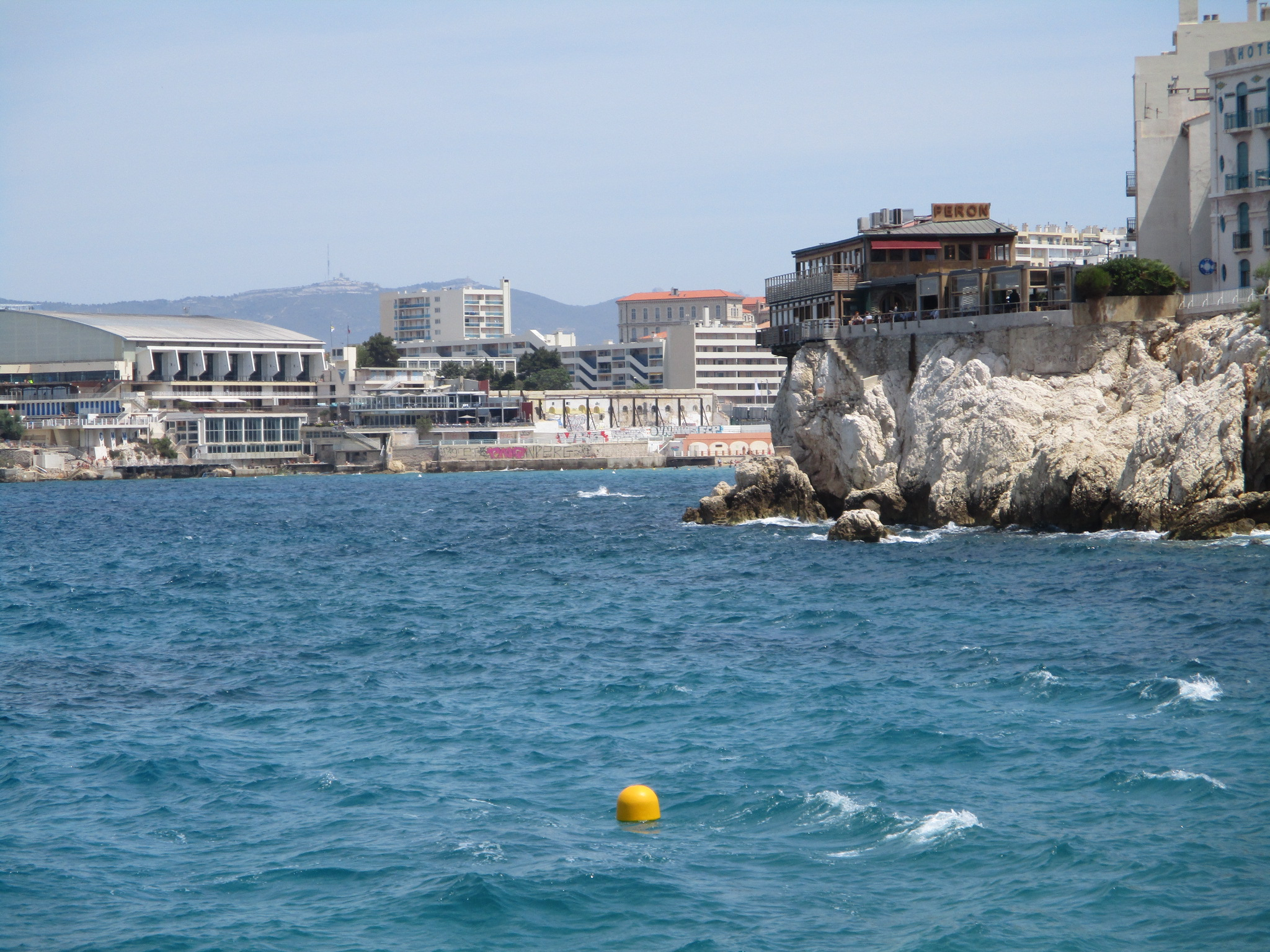
Le Peron restaurant

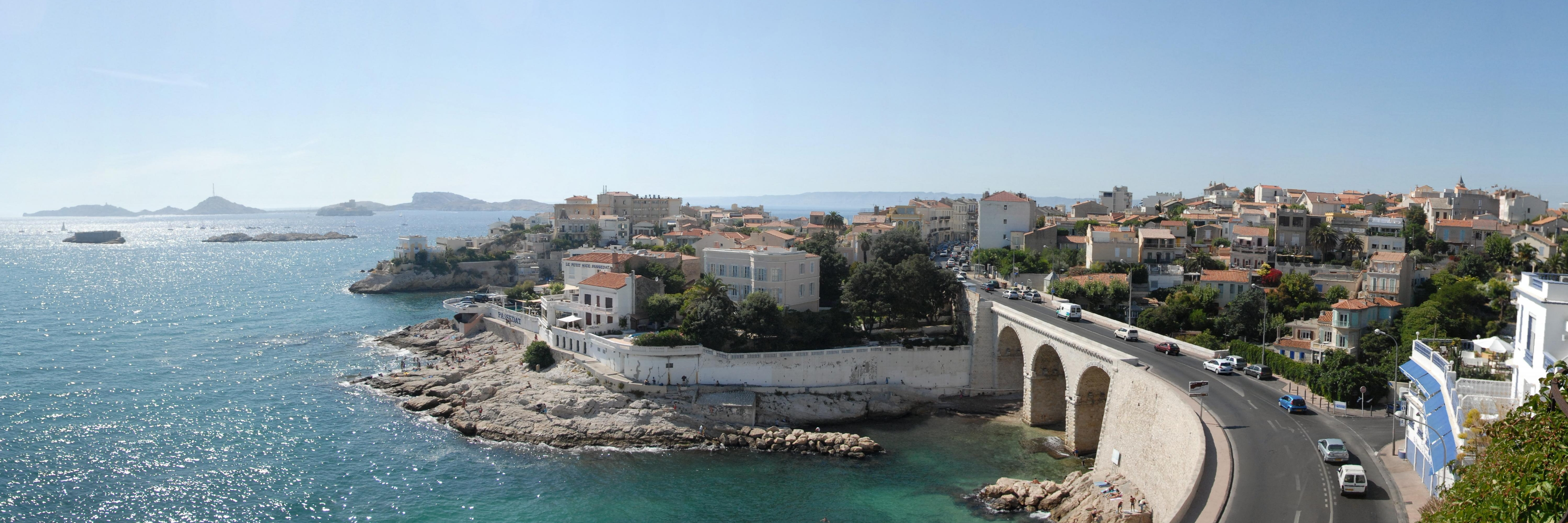
Counterfeit Money Bridge

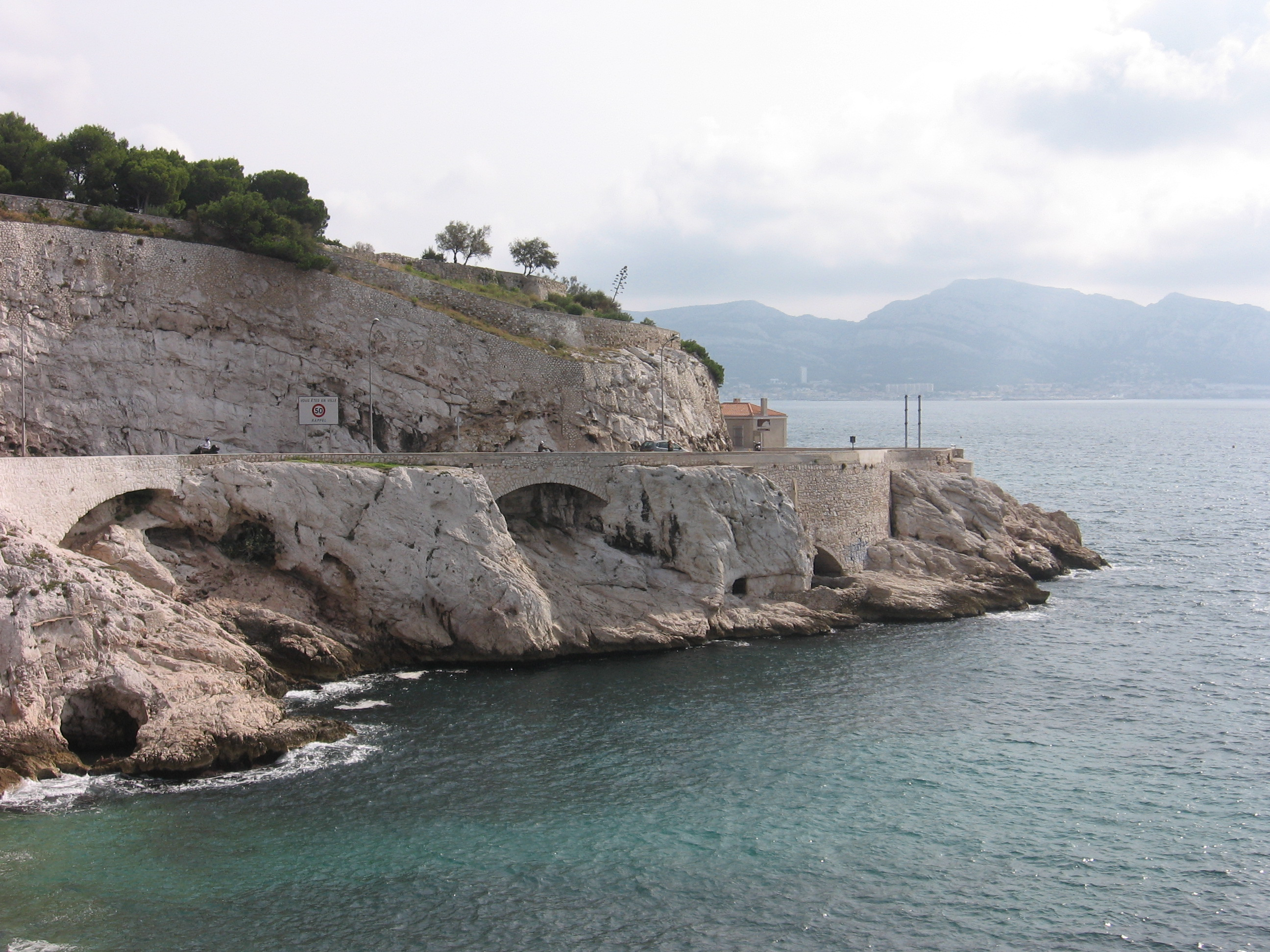
Broadwalk near the Marégraphe
