= Tillett (surname) =

Tillett or Tillet is a French surname that may refer to:

- Akeem Tillett (died 2020), Belizean inmate
- Barbara Tillett (born 1946), American librarian and library scholar
- Ben Tillett (1860–1943), British politician and trade unionist
- Évrard Titon du Tillet (1677–1762), French biographer
- Gladys Avery Tillett (1891–1984), American political organizer
- iO Tillett Wright, American author, photographer, TV host, and activist
- Jacob Henry Tillett (1818–1892), English politician
- Jacques du Tillet (1857–1942), French author and critic
- Jeanette Tillett (1888-1965) American composer and music educator
- John Tillett (British Army officer) (1919–2014), British Army officer
- Louis Tillett (1959–2023), Australian rock music singer-songwriter, keyboardist and saxophonist
- Louis Tillett (politician) (1865–1929), British politician
- Mathieu Tillet (1714–1791), French scientist and administrator
- Maurice Tillet (1903–1954), French poet and wrestler
- Wilbur Fisk Tillett (1854–1936), American clergyman and educator
- William S. Tillett (1892–1974), American internist and microbiologist
- Évrard Titon du Tillet (1677–1762), French historian
- Jacques du Tillet (1857–1942), French author and critic
- Jean du Tillet (died 1570), French Catholic bishop
- Salamishah Tillet (born 1975), American scholar, activist, social critic, and media personality
