= Vallon des Auffes =

Le vallon des Auffes
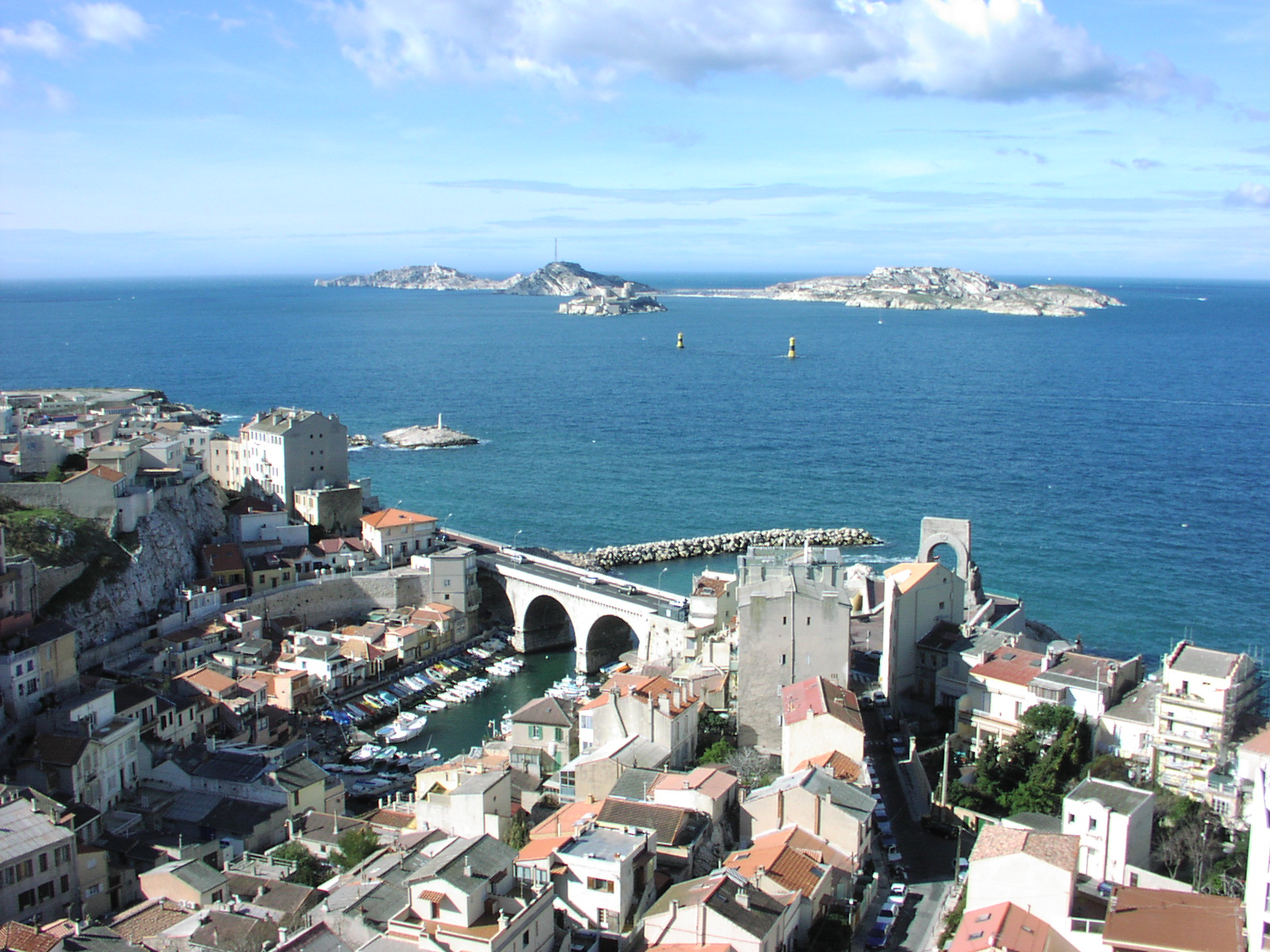
- Vallon des Auffes, traversé par le pont de la corniche Kennedy, et archipel du Frioul au large
- Click on the map for a fullscreen view

Location
- Location: Marseille, Bouches-du-Rhône, France
- Coordinates: 43.28538°N 5.350932°E

Details
- Type of harbour: Port de pêche traditionnelle

The Vallon des Auffes is a little traditional fishing haven in Marseille in the 7th arrondissement of Marseille. It is situated 2.5 km south-west of the Vieux-Port over the Corniche Kennedy, between the Catalans beach and Malmousque bay.

== History ==
This small port / valley houses, on both sides of the bridge, about fifty fishermen's cabins and small traditional fishing boats, including some traditional pointu boats. The catch is reserved for local restaurants.

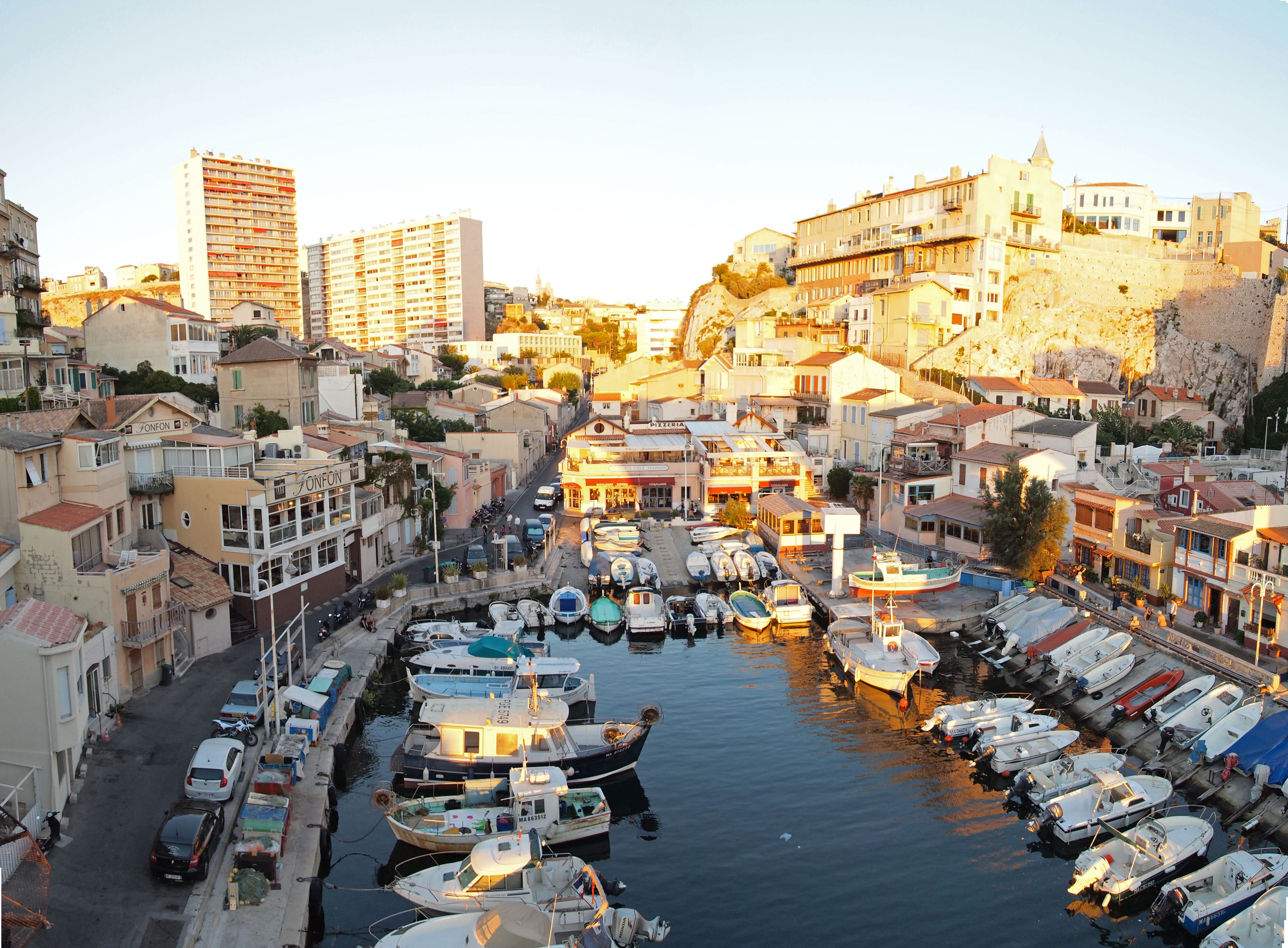

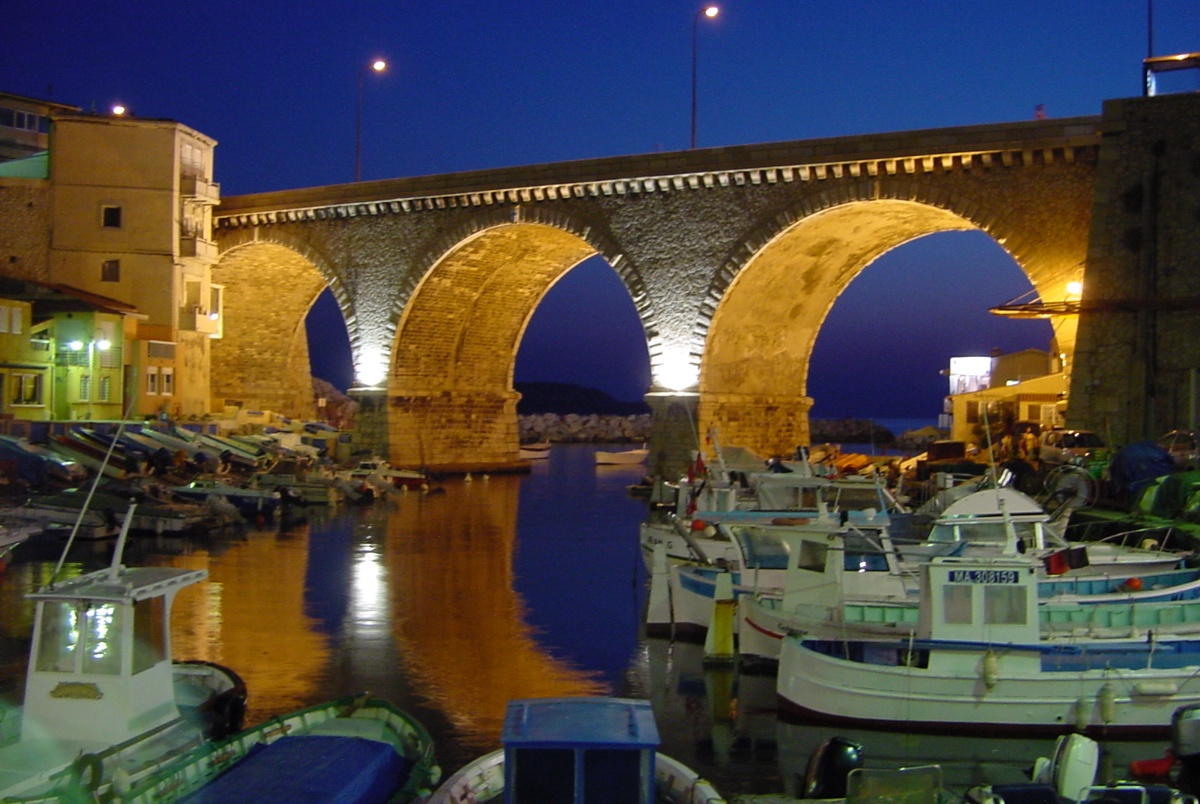

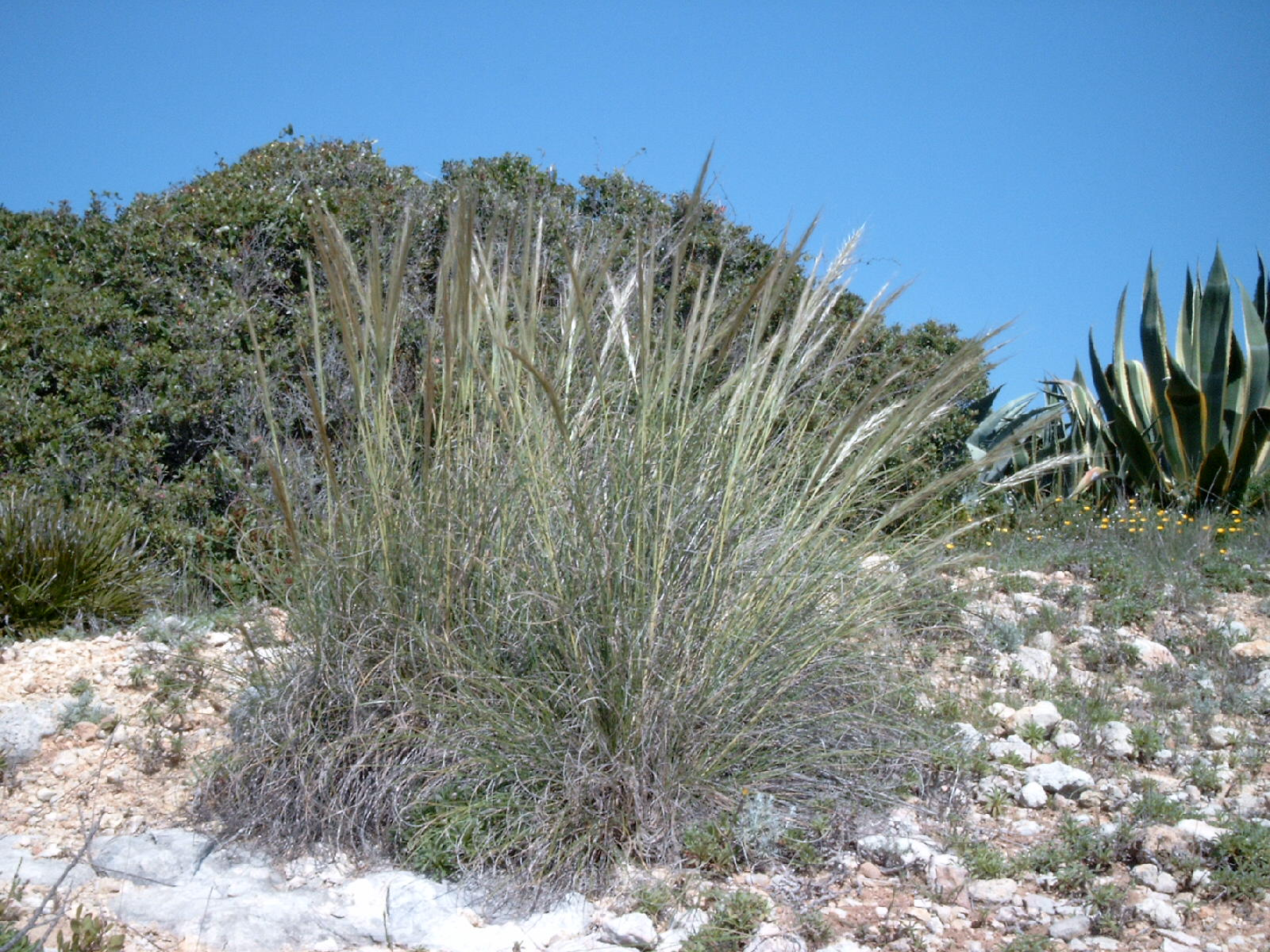
Auffe or alfa

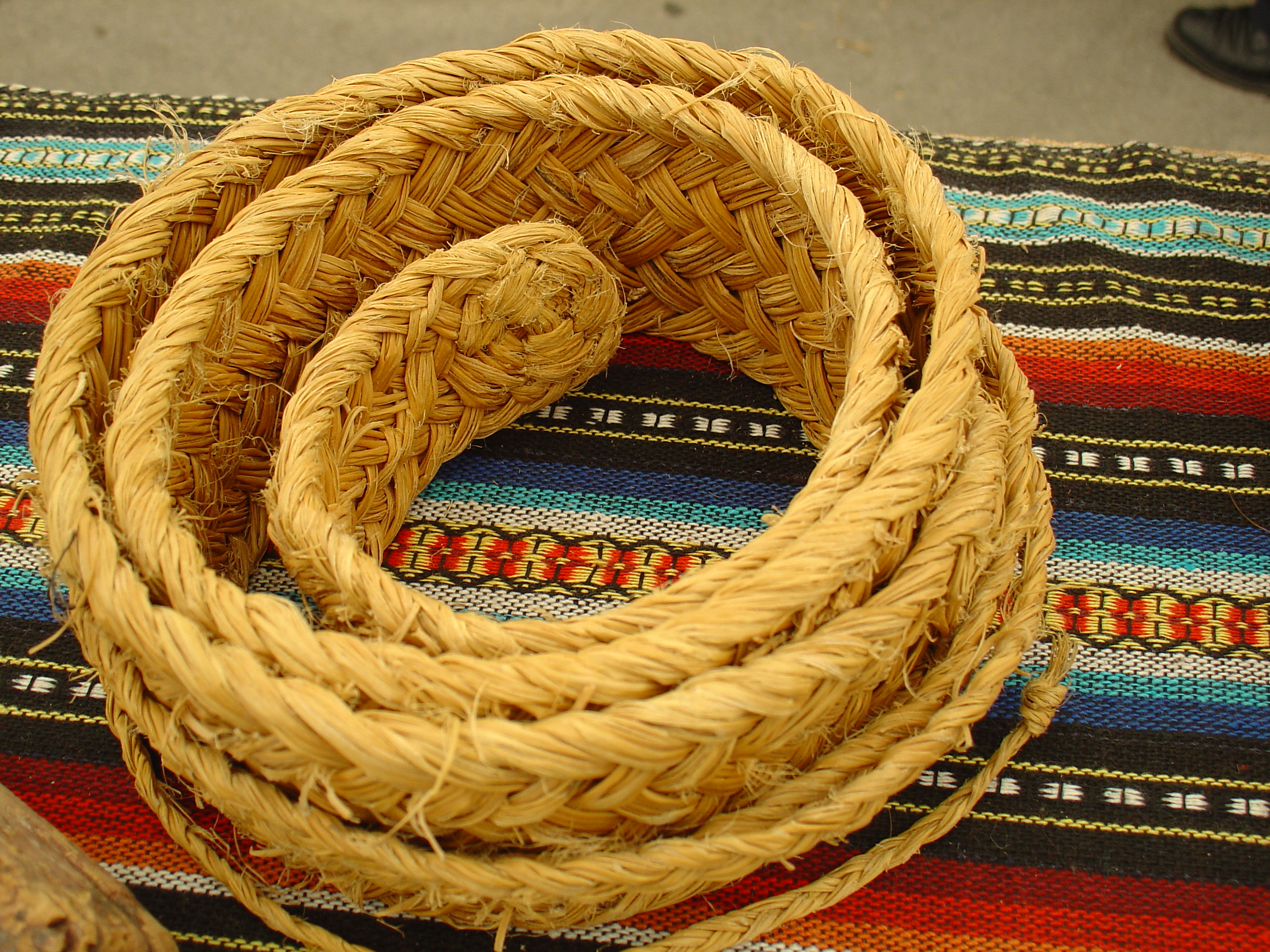
Example of a creation from alfa

It takes its name from "l'auffe" ("auffo" in provençal dialect), or "alfa" (Stipa tenacissima), a sort of grass used to make rope, braids, and fishing nets.

The reinforced concrete arched bridge, made from stone masonry, forms three semicircular arches each 17 m (56 ft) tall. It crosses the port with a total length of 60 m (200 ft). It was built in the 19th century, during the construction of the Corniche of President John F. Kennedy. The cove was blocked off during the construction of the foundations in order to keep it dry.

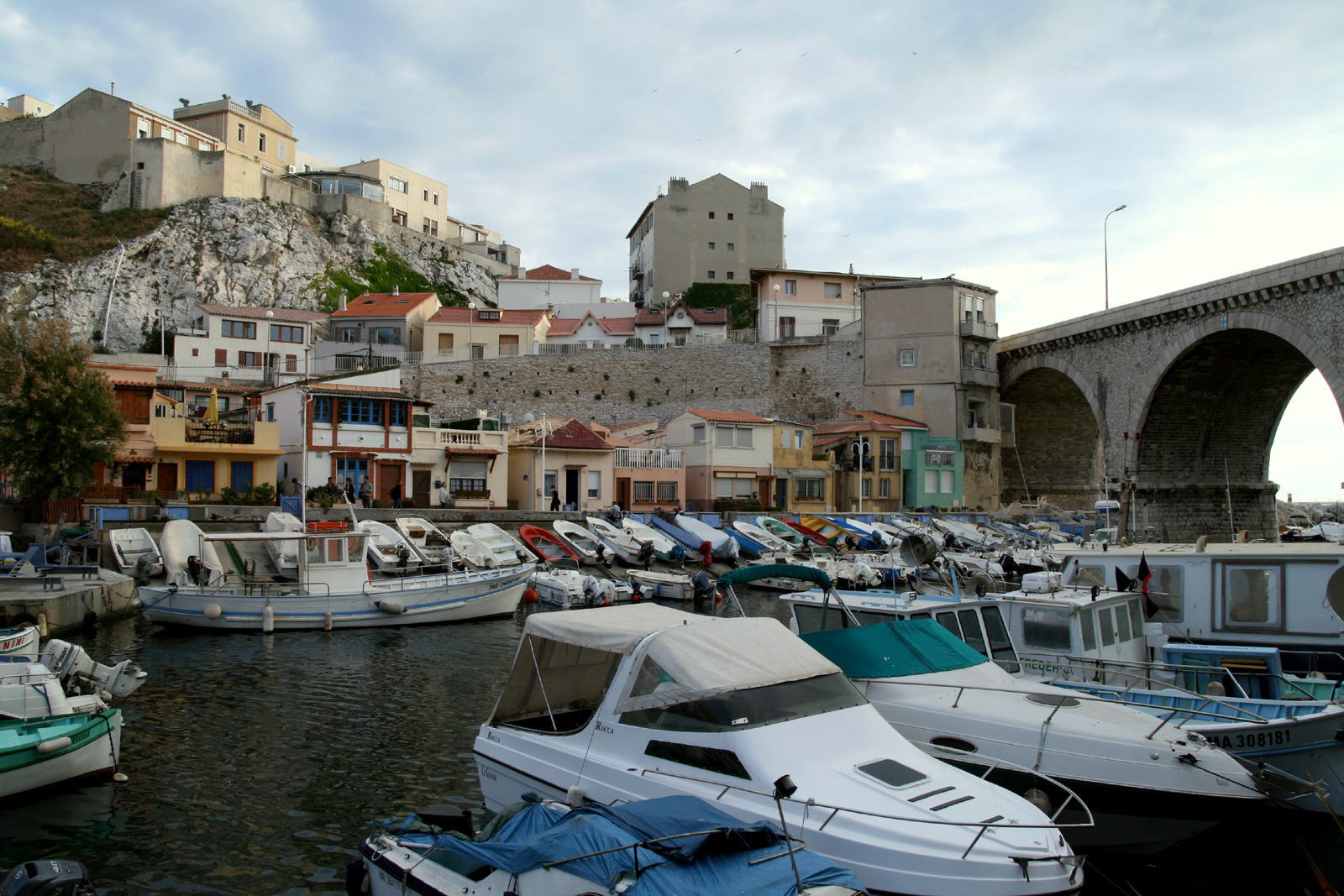

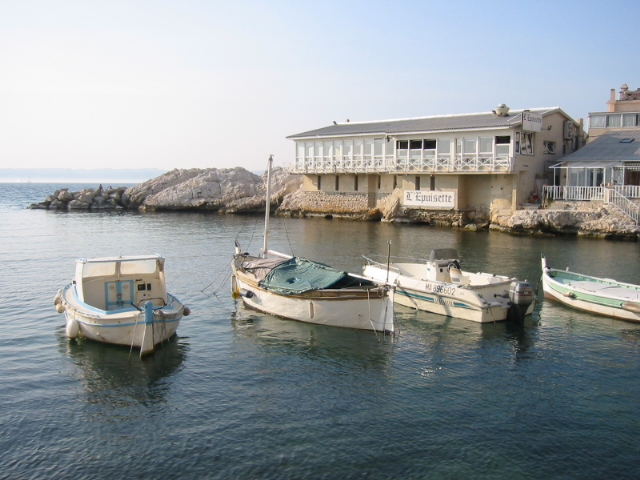

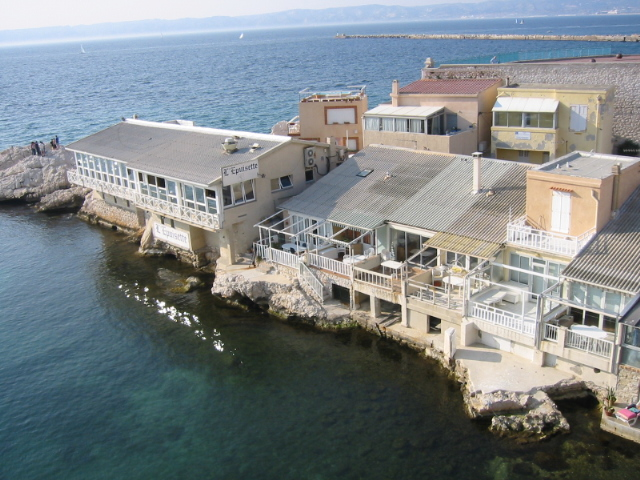

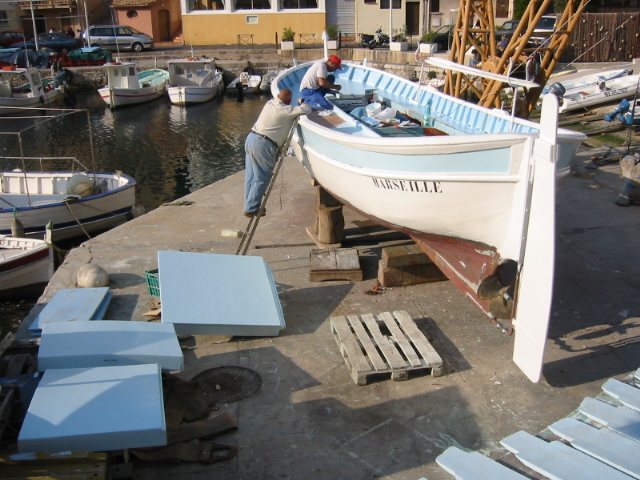

In 1927, the President of France Gaston Doumergue inaugurated the monument to the dead of the East Army and the far lands, a 5 m tall bronze statue of a woman with arms raised to the sky, facing the Mediterranean Sea. It was classified as a historic monument on July 23, 2009.

From 1998 to 2006, a large painted mural of the famous footballer from Marseille, Zinedine Zidane, was put up by Adidas over the valley with the annotation "Made in Marseille". This was then replaced by a Coca-Cola advert. In 2013, when Marseille was awarded the title of the European capital of culture, the artist JR revealed a poster of an unknown woman from Marseille (Annick Perrot-Bishop) as a nod to that of the famous footballer, in order to illustrate the opening of Marseille to the world. This portrait has in turn been replaced by an advert for a famous brand of sunglasses.
