= Saint-Hippolyte-de-Caton =

- Commune
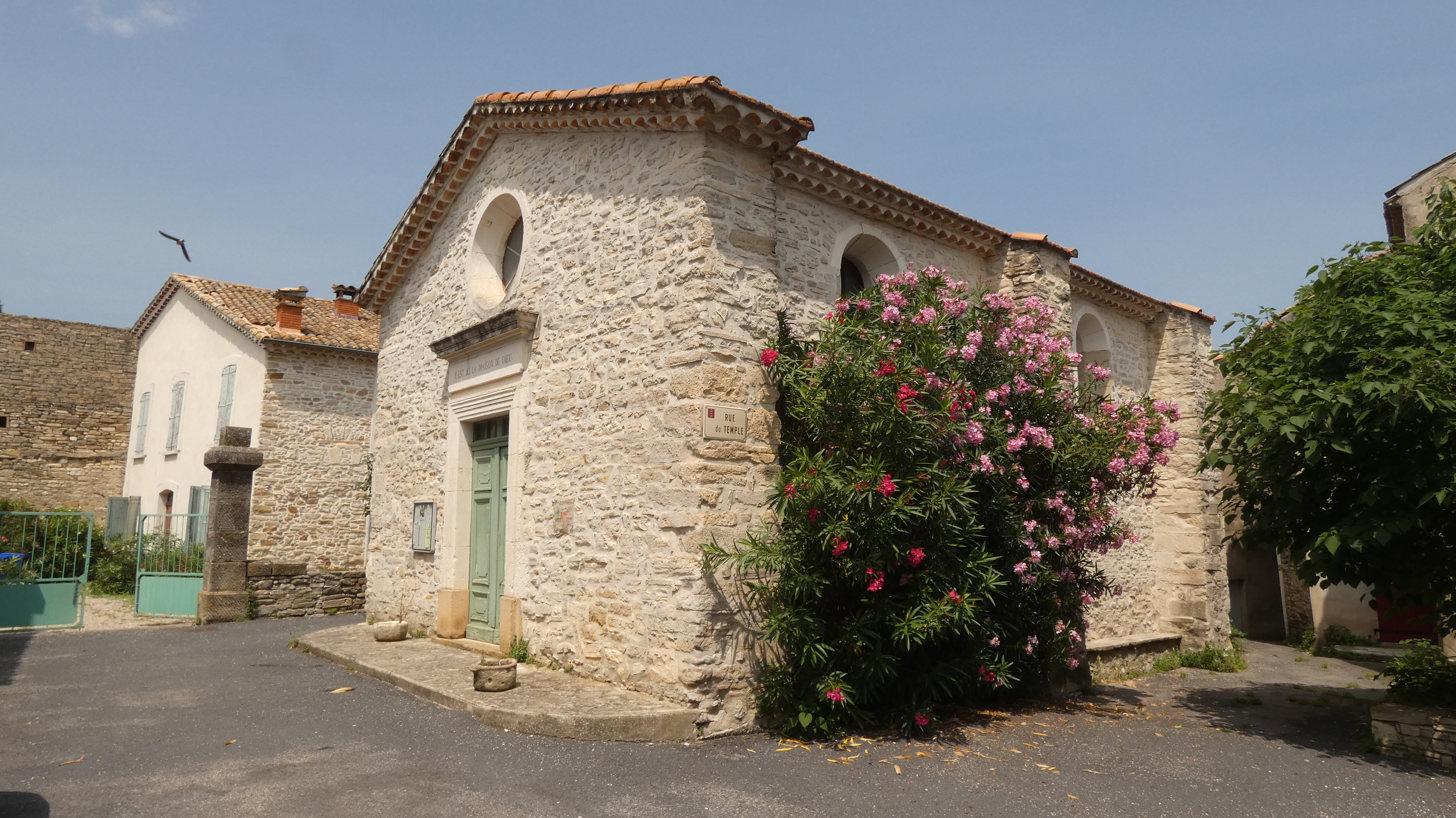
- Protestant temple of Saint-Hippolyte-de-Caton

- Coat of arms
- Location of Saint-Hippolyte-de-Caton
- Location within France Location within Occitanie
- Coordinates: 44°04′17″N 4°12′14″E
- Country: France
- Region: Occitania
- Department: Gard
- Arrondissement: Alès
- Canton: Alès-3
- Intercommunality: Alès Agglomération

Government
  - Mayor (2020–2026): Philippe Fromental
- Area^{1}: 6.15 km^{2} (2.37 sq mi)
- Elevation: 100 m (330 ft)
- Highest elevation: 210 m (690 ft)
- Lowest elevation: 107 m (351 ft)
- Population (2023): 284
  - Density: 46.2/km^{2} (120/sq mi)
- Time zone: UTC+01:00 (CET)
  - Summer (DST): UTC+02:00 (CEST)
- INSEE/Postal code: 30261 /30360
- ^{1} French Land Register data, which excludes lakes, ponds, glaciers > 1 km^{2} (0.386 sq mi or 247 acres) and river estuaries.

Saint-Hippolyte-de-Caton (French pronunciation: [sɛ̃.t‿ipɔlit də katɔ̃]; Provençal: Sent Ipolit de Caton) is a commune in the Gard department in southern France. The archaeologist and epigrapher Émile Espérandieu (1857–1939) was born in the commune.

== Population ==
Historical population
Year	Pop.	±% p.a.
1968	138	—
1975	131	−0.74%
1982	135	+0.43%
1990	158	+1.99%
1999	158	+0.00%
2007	199	+2.93%
2012	215	+1.56%
2017	213	−0.19%
2023	284	+4.91%
Source: INSEE

== See also ==
- Communes of the Gard department
