= Louis Honoré Arnavon =

French politician (1786–1841)

- Born: 9 July 1786; Marseille, Bouches-du-Rhône, France
- Died: 18 October 1841 (aged 55); Marseille, Bouches-du-Rhône, France
- Occupations: Soap manufacturer, politician
- Spouse: Julie Pelletan
- Parent(s): Honoré Arnavon; Aimée Méranville
- Relatives: Jules Charles-Roux (grandson)

Louis Honoré Arnavon (9 July 1786 – 18 October 1841) was a French soap manufacturer and politician. He served as a city councillor of Marseille in 1830, and as a member of the National Assembly from 8 September 1831 until his resignation on 31 October 1831. He was a Knight of the Legion of Honour.
