= Claire De Forbin =

Claire de Forbin La Barben (née Charles-Roux; 10 April 1908 – 1992) fought with the French Resistance during World War II. Married to the last marquess of Forbin-la Barben, she was the lover of Isabel Pell and Mercedes de Acosta.

== Biography ==
Claire Charles-Roux was born on 10 April 1908 in Avignon, the daughter of Charles Wulfran Marie Louis Charles-Roux (1875–1918) and Henriette Marie "Magdeleine" Yvaren (1887–1979). Her grandfather was Jules Charles-Roux, her paternal uncle was François Charles-Roux. She was raised in Morocco.

On 6 June 1932, she married Michel François Marie Antoine de Forbin des Issarts La Barben (1903–1987). De Forbin, last marquess of Forbin-la Barben, sold château de La Barben to his friend André Pons in 1963.

During World War II, she was active in the Resistance.

In the 1930s and 1940s, her partner was Isabel Pell; while in a relationship with Pell, De Forbin met Pell's friend Mercedes de Acosta, and they had an affair. De Forbin visited de Acosta during the Christmas season of 1947. When de Forbin returned to Paris, de Acosta followed her.

She died in 1992 in Lausanne.
