= Jacques du Tillet =

French author and critic (1857–1942)

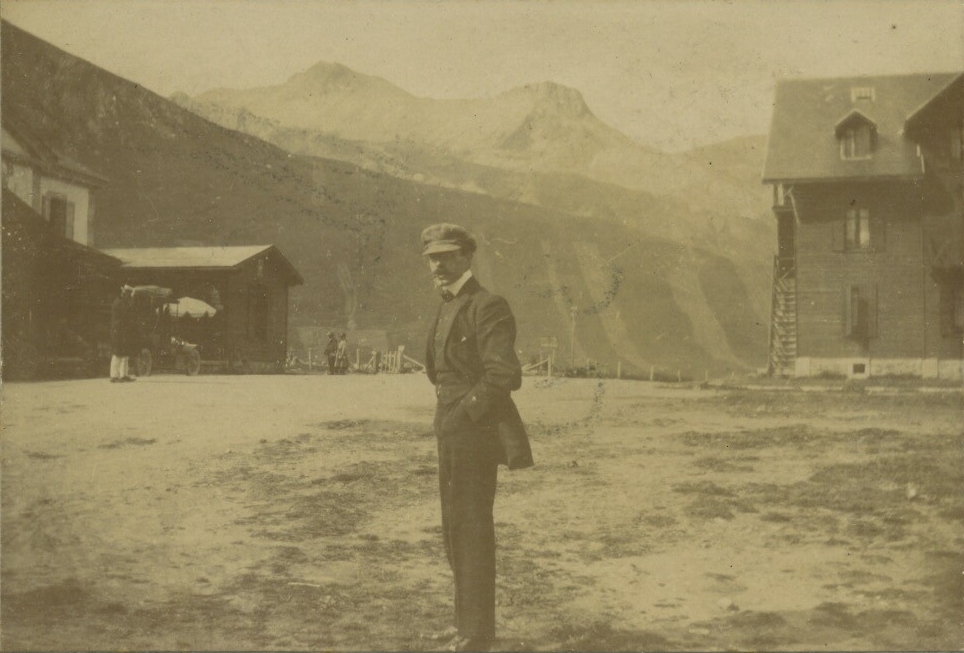
- Born: 29 March 1857
- Died: 1942 (aged 84–85)
- Occupations: Author, critic
- Spouse: Marie-Louise Charles-Roux
- Relatives: Jules Charles-Roux (father-in-law)

Jacques du Tillet (1857–1942) was a French writer and critic. He published four novels. He was a theatre critic for the Revue politique et littéraire. In 1895, he wrote a glowing review of actress Gabrielle Réjane, appearing in the American press.

== Works ==
- Du Tillet, Jacques (1892). Cœur d'actrice. Paris: Calmann Lévy. OCLC 44403681.
- Du Tillet, Jacques (1892). De nos jours. Paris: E. Kolb. OCLC 82382451.
- Du Tillet, Jacques (1900). En Egypte. Paris: Schleicher frères. OCLC 464066939.
- Du Tillet, Jacques (1903). Petites femmes. Paris: Calmann Lévy. OCLC 468743459.
