= Palais du Roure =

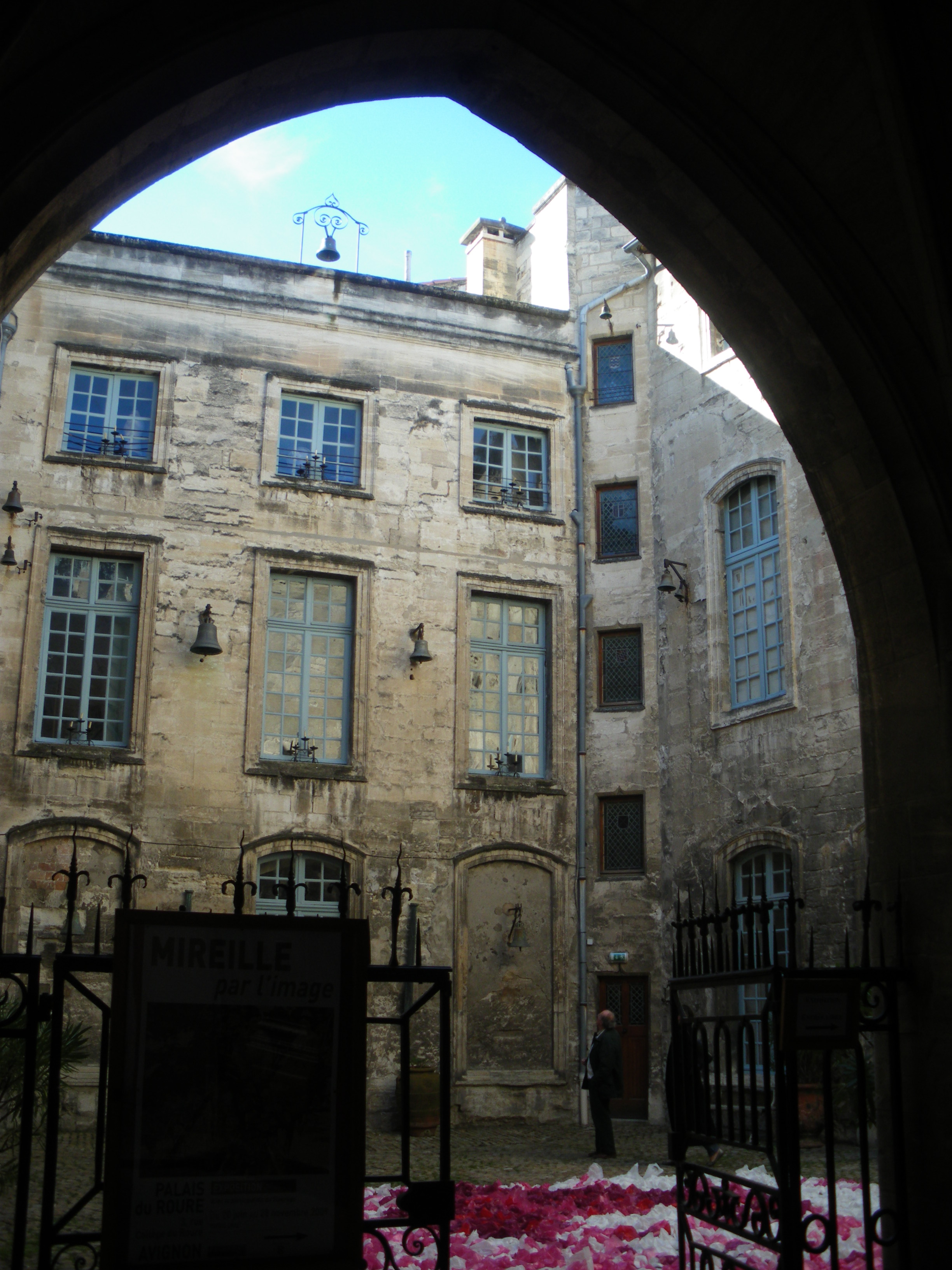
- Interactive map of the Palais du Roure area

General information
- Type: Hôtel particulier
- Location: Avignon, France
- Coordinates: 43.9484°N 4.8054°E

The Palais du Roure is a listed hôtel particulier in Avignon, France.

== History ==
It belonged to the Baroncelli family until it was purchased by author Jeanne de Flandreysy in 1918. She bequeathed the building to Avignon.

== Collections ==
It is maintained as a museum. The collections include memorabilia of John Stuart Mill, the British economist who died in Avignon in 1873.

== Conservation ==
It has been listed as an official historical monument since 19 November 1941.
