= François Charles-Roux =

French businessman, historian and diplomat

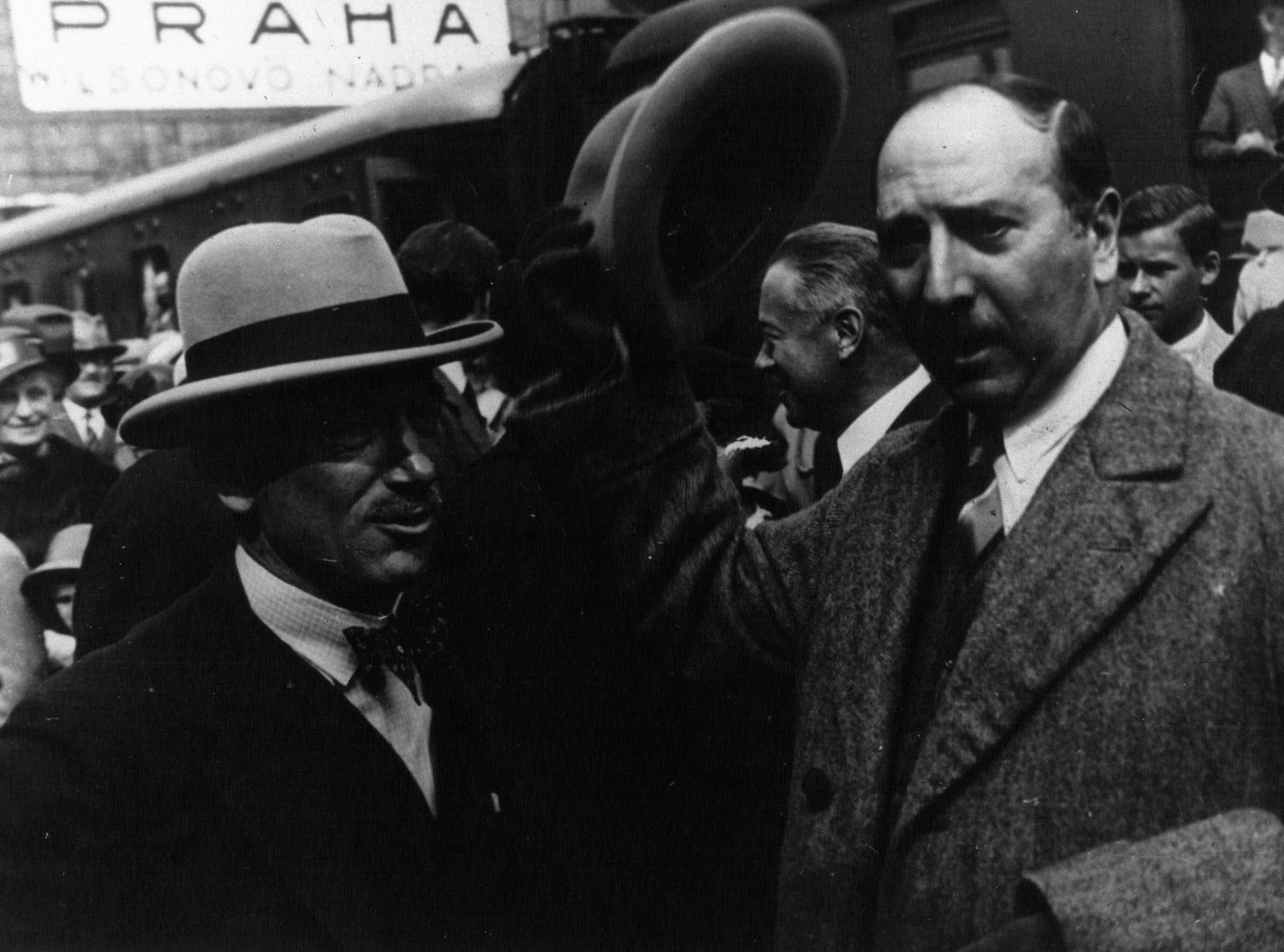

François Charles-Roux (19 November 1879 – 26 June 1961) was a French businessman, historian and diplomat. He was born in Marseille.

== Biography ==
Charles-Roux, the son of Jules Charles-Roux, studied at the École libre des sciences politiques. This led to a diplomatic career in Paris, St. Petersburg, Constantinople, Cairo, London and Prague before being appointed Ambassador of France to the Holy See in 1932.

In May 1940, he succeeded Alexis Léger to the position of Secretary General of the French Foreign Ministry but left office the following October.

After World War II, he was a strong supporter of keeping the French colonial empire including the ultra group Présence française which fought for the maintenance of the French protectorate in Morocco. He was chairman of the Central Committee of the Ministry of Overseas France and President of the Suez Canal Company from 1948 to 1956. He also chaired the Catholic Relief.

His work as a historian led to him being elected a member of the Academy of Moral and Political Science in 1934.

François Charles-Roux married Sabine Gounelle in 1914. She was from a family of merchants in Marseille who owned the Villa Valmer. They had three children: the writer Edmonde Charles-Roux, socialite Cyprienne Charles-Roux, and priest Jean-Marie Charles-Roux.

== Selected works ==
- Bonaparte, gouverneur d'Égypte (1936).
- Huit Ans au Vatican, 1932-1940 (1947), about his years at the Vatican
