= Jules Charles-Roux =

French businessman and politician

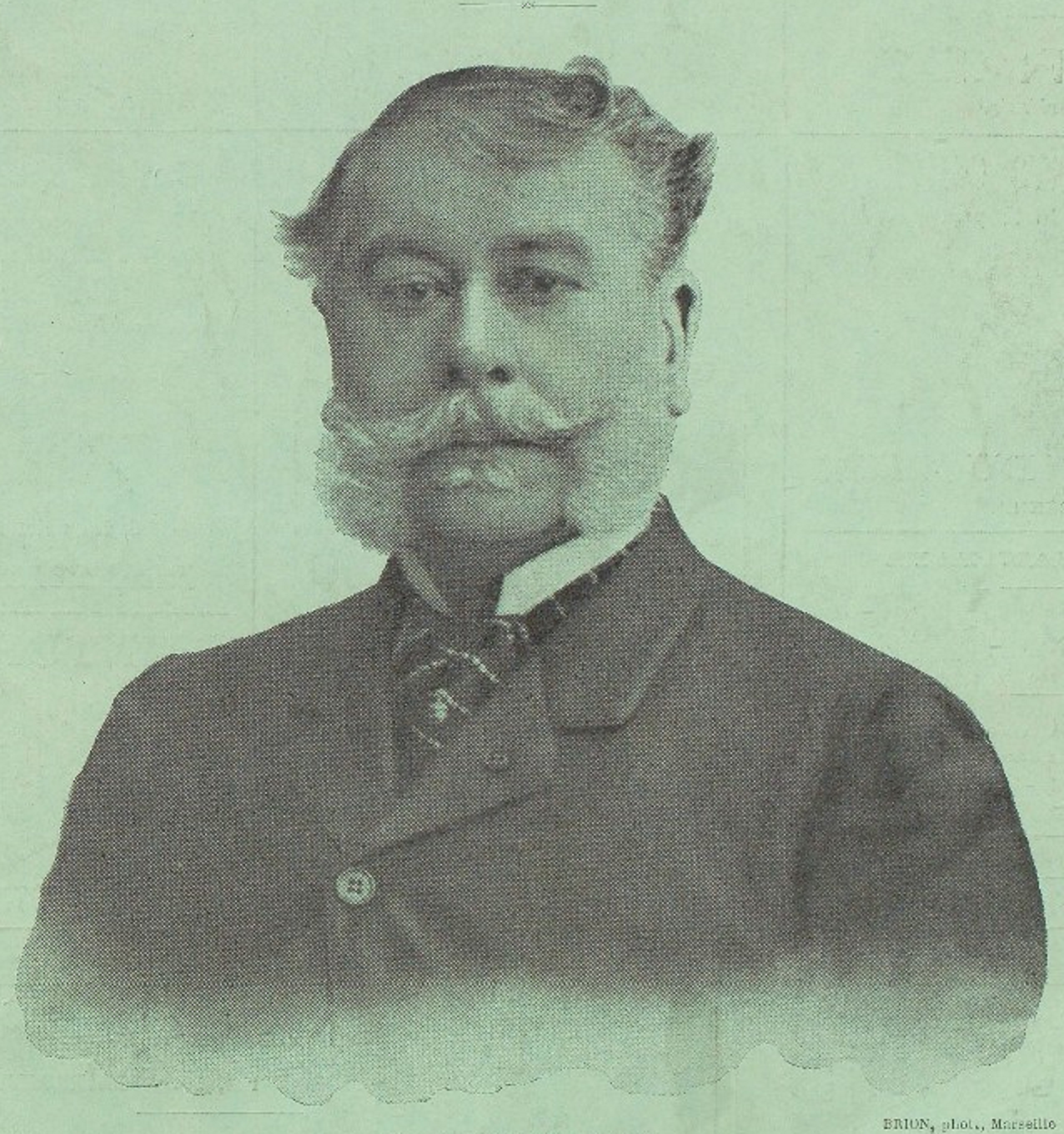
- Aged 64 or approaching
- Born: Charles, Jules, Théodore Roux; 14 November 1841; Marseille, France
- Died: 6 March 1918 (aged 76); Paris, France
- Education: Aix-Marseille University
- Occupations: Politician, businessman
- Spouse: Marie-Claire Canaple
- Children: 2 sons, 1 daughter
- Parent(s): Charles Roux; Marie-Anne Arnavon
- Relatives: Louis Honoré Arnavon (grandfather); Jacques du Tillet (son-in-law); Edmonde Charles-Roux (granddaughter)

Jules Charles-Roux (14 November 1841 – 6 March 1918) was a French businessman and politician. He served as the vice president of the Suez Canal Company. He served as a corporate director of shipping companies in the Antilles, West Africa and French Indochina. He was a supporter of the French colonial empire.

== Early life ==
Jules Charles-Roux was born on 14 November 1841 in Marseille, France. His father founded La Maison Charles-Roux, a soap factory, in 1828. His paternal ancestor, Georges Roux, was a merchant in the Antilles in the 18th century.

Charles-Roux graduated from Aix-Marseille University, where he studied chemistry.

== Career ==
Charles-Roux started his career by working for his father's company. He subsequently worked for the Marseille chamber of commerce.

Charles-Roux served on the boards of directors of the Compagnie Générale Transatlantique, the Compagnie Fraissinet, the Companie des Messageries Maritimes, the Compagnie des correspondances fluviales du Tonkin, the Distilleries de la Méditerranée and the Banque de France. He was also on the board of the Suez Canal Company, eventually serving as its vice president in 1897.

Charles-Roux was a supporter of the French colonial empire and free market economics, partly due to the influence of Léon Say. He served on the city council of Marseille from 1887 to 1889. He served as a member of the Chamber of Deputies from 1889 to 1898. During his tenure, he supported pro-French tariffs and subsidies to French shipping companies.

Charles-Roux was a collector of old manuscripts. He was a Commander of the Legion of Honour, a Commander of the Order of Christ, and an Officer of the Order of the Medjidie.

== Personal life and death ==
Charles-Roux married Marie-Claire Canaple. They had two sons, François Charles-Roux and Charles Wulfran Marie Louis Charles-Roux (father of Claire De Forbin), and a daughter, who married Jacques du Tillet.

Charles-Roux died on 6 March 1918 in Paris.

== Works ==
- Charles-Roux, Jules (1898). Notre marine marchande. Paris: A. Colin & cie. OCLC 23432468.
