= Villa Valmer =

Villa in Marseille, France

Coordinates: 43.2797°N 5.3550°E

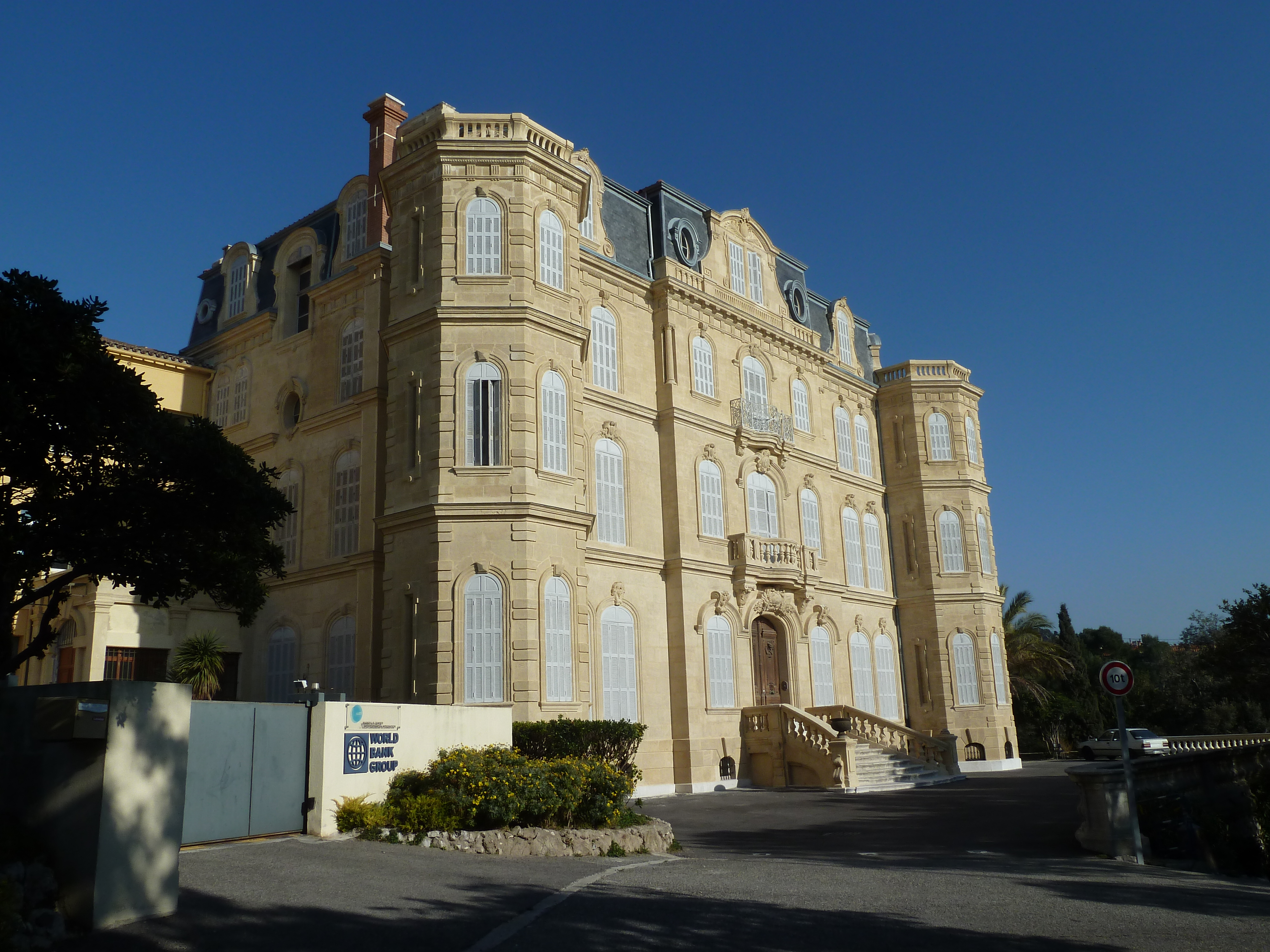
Villa Valmer

The Villa Valmer (French pronunciation: [vila valmɛʁ]) is a historic mansion in the 7th arrondissement of Marseille, France.

It is located near several other villas such as the La villa de Gaby Deslys. The building is in the Renaissance style with three floors. There is a garden open to the public.

Marseille (France)

== History ==
The villa was built for Charles Gounelle, an oil manufacturer, in 1865. It was designed by architect Henry Condamin. It is home to the United Nations Industrial Development Organization.

== Origin of Name ==
Originally named "Wave to the Sea", it was later called Villa Valmer.
