= Gard's 4th constituency =

Constituency of the National Assembly of France

4th constituency of Gard
- inline Constituency of the National Assembly of France

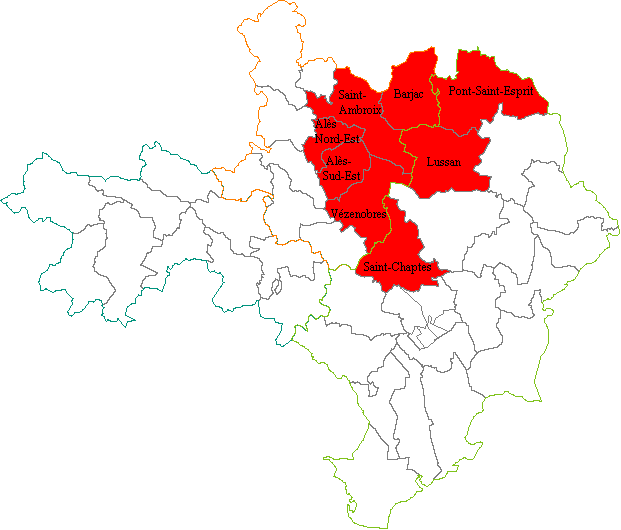
- Location of constituency in Department

- Deputy: Pierre Meurin; RN
- Department: Gard

The 4th constituency of Gard is a French legislative constituency in the Gard département. It consists of the cantons of Alès-2, Alès-3, Pont-Saint-Esprit and the communes of Barjac, Lussan, Saint-Ambroix, Saint-Chaptes and Vézénobres.

== Deputies ==
Election	Member	Party
2012	Fabrice Verdier	PS
2017	Annie Chapelier	LREM
2020	Annie Chapelier	EDS
2022	Pierre Meurin	RN
2024	Pierre Meurin	RN

== Election results ==
=== 2024 ===
Candidate	Party	Alliance	First round			Second round		
Candidate	Party	Alliance	Votes	%	+/–	Votes	%	+/–
Pierre Meurin	RN		31,366	48.69	+18.13	35,144	57.64	+3.48
Arnaud Bord	PS	NFP	17,639	27.38	+0.80	25,832	42.36	-3.48
Nadia El Okki	REN	Ensemble	10,538	16.36	-5.22			
Pierre Martin	LR	UDC	3,930	6.10	+2.97			
Jérôme Garcia	LO		948	1.47	-0.08			
Votes			64,421	100.00		60,976	100.00	
Valid votes			64,421	97.30	-0.60	60,976	92.18	+2.85
Blank votes			1,220	1.84	+0.31	3,835	5.80	-2.12
Null votes			565	0.85	+0.28	1,340	2.03	-0.72
Turnout			66,206	69.66	+21.31	66,151	69.60	+21.07
Abstentions			28,841	30.34	-21.31	28,894	30.40	-21.07
Registered voters			95,047			95,045		
Result			RN HOLD					

=== 2022 ===
Legislative Election 2022: Gard's 4th constituency
Party	Candidate	Votes	%	±%
RN	Pierre Meurin	13,648	30.56	+9.12
PS (NUPÉS)	Arnaud Bord	11,870	26.58	-10.76
Agir (Ensemble)	Philippe Ribot	9,637	21.58	−2.83
REC	Aurélie Wagner	2,046	4.58	N/A
DVD	Jean-Pierre De Faria	1,631	3.65	N/A
UDI (UDC)	Valérie Martre	1,400	3.13	−8.30
DVE	Nadine Schuster	1,043	2.34	N/A
Others	N/A	3,389	7.59	
Turnout		44,664	48.35	−0.88
2nd round result
RN	Pierre Meurin	22,155	54.16	+12.37
PS (NUPÉS)	Arnaud Bord	18,749	45.84	N/A
Turnout		40,904	48.53	+5.47
RN gain from LREM				

=== 2017 ===
Candidate	Label	First round		Second round	
Candidate	Label	Votes	%	Votes	%
Annie Chapelier	REM	10,661	24.41	20,027	58.21
Brigitte Roullaud	FN	9,364	21.44	14,375	41.79
Fabrice Verdier	PS	7,211	16.51		
Lucie Rousselou	FI	5,427	12.42		
Valérie Meunier	LR	4,991	11.43		
Claude Cerpedes	PCF	3,007	6.88		
Dirk Offringa	ECO	667	1.53		
Rose-Marie Cohen	ECO	605	1.39		
Marie-Noëlle Bidin	DIV	341	0.78		
Patrice Ciuti	EXG	323	0.74		
Christophe Gache	DVG	298	0.68		
Thierry Tournaire	ECO	276	0.63		
Rachid Nekaa	DVD	180	0.41		
Didier Bonneaud	ECO	164	0.38		
Sylvie Barbe	ECO	164	0.38		
Votes		43,679	100.00	34,402	100.00
Valid votes		43,679	97.38	34,402	87.69
Blank votes		842	1.88	3,577	9.12
Null votes		331	0.74	1,251	3.19
Turnout		44,852	49.23	39,230	43.06
Abstentions		46,257	50.77	51,873	56.94
Registered voters		91,109		91,103	
Source: Ministry of the Interior

=== 2012 ===
2012 legislative election in Gard's 4th constituency
Candidate	Party	First round		Second round	
Candidate	Party	Votes	%	Votes	%
Max Roustan	UMP	17,048	31.19%	25,079	47.90%
Fabrice Verdier	PS–EELV	16,130	29.51%	27,274	52.10%
Hélène Zouroudis	FN	10,689	19.55%		
Edouard Chaulet	FG	8,350	15.28%		
Odile Veillerette	EELV dissident	641	1.17%		
Isabelle Brion	??	544	1.00%		
Denise Ponge	UDN	473	0.87%		
Murielle Lordelot	DLR	259	0.47%		
Sophie Pasqualini		169	0.31%		
Patrice Ciuti	LO	167	0.31%		
Vincent Rivet-Martel	AEI	100	0.18%		
Pascal Imbert		94	0.17%		
Valid votes		54,664	98.68%	52,353	96.43%
Spoilt and null votes		732	1.32%	1,941	3.57%
Votes cast / turnout		55,396	63.15%	54,294	61.89%
Abstentions		32,325	36.85%	33,428	38.11%
Registered voters		87,721	100.00%	87,722	100.00%

=== 2007 ===
Legislative Election 2007: Gard's 4th constituency
Party	Candidate	Votes	%	±%
UMP	Max Rouston	23,829	44.62	
PCF	Patrick Malavieille	11,570	21.66	
PS	Chantal Vinot	7,057	13.21	
FN	Prisca Vicat	2,753	5.15	
MoDem	Jean-Louis Haon	2,359	4.42	
Far left	Daniel Angot	1,425	2.67	
Others	N/A	4,412		
Turnout		54,298	63.53	
2nd round result
UMP	Max Rouston	28,106	53.15	
PCF	Patrick Malavieille	24,778	46.85	
Turnout		54,875	64.21	
UMP hold				

=== 2002 ===
Legislative Election 2002: Gard's 4th constituency
Party	Candidate	Votes	%	±%
UMP	Max Roustan	17,876	34.32	
PCF	Patrick Malavieille	11,738	22.54	
FN	Jean-Louis Bastid	7,514	14.43	
PS	Chantal Vinot	7,302	14.02	
CPNT	Pierre Aubert	1,111	2.13	
Others	N/A	6,543		
Turnout		53,416	66.94	
2nd round result
UMP	Max Roustan	25,625	52.19	
PCF	Patrick Malavieille	23,475	47.81	
Turnout		51,808	64.93	
UMP gain from PCF				

=== 1997 ===
Legislative Election 1997: Gard's 4th constituency
Party	Candidate	Votes	%	±%
PCF	Patrick Malavieille	14,344	27.46	
UDF	Max Roustan	12,273	23.50	
PS	Suzanne Coulet	9,780	18.73	
FN	André Roudil	9,447	18.09	
DVD	Jocelyn Morales	1,595	3.05	
LV	Pierre Alais	1,346	2.58	
LO	Michèle Villanueva	1,288	2.47	
Others	N/A	2,155		
Turnout		54,828	71.05	
2nd round result
PCF	Patrick Malavieille	31,302	57.69	
UDF	Max Roustan	22,954	42.31	
Turnout		58,599	75.95	
PCF hold				
