= Saint-Jean-de-Ceyrargues =

- Commune
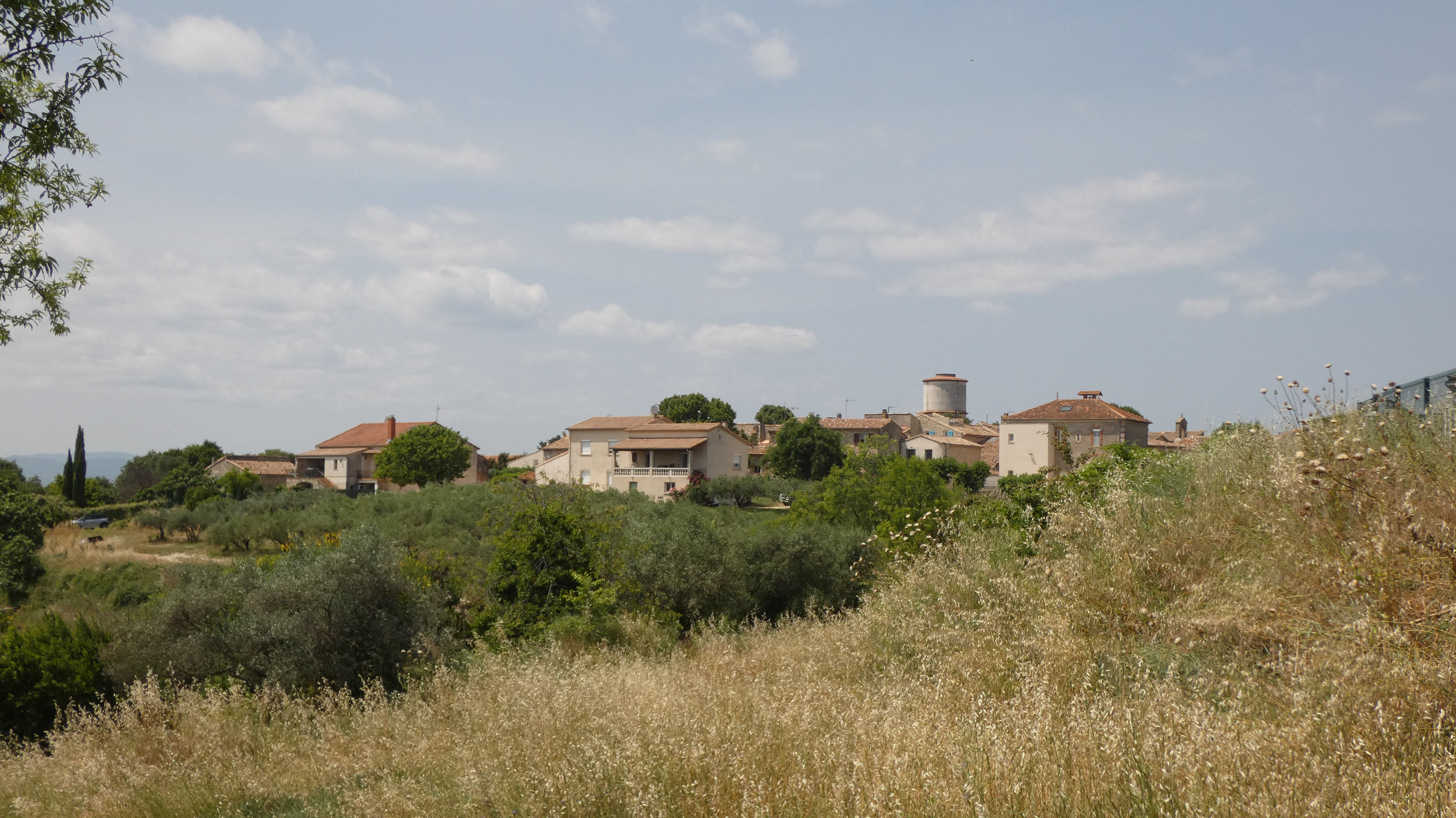

- Coat of arms
- Location of Saint-Jean-de-Ceyrargues
- Location within France Location within Occitanie
- Coordinates: 44°03′08″N 4°13′40″E
- Country: France
- Region: Occitania
- Department: Gard
- Arrondissement: Alès
- Canton: Alès-3
- Intercommunality: Alès Agglomération

Government
  - Mayor (2020–2026): Georges Dautun
- Area^{1}: 6.65 km^{2} (2.57 sq mi)
- Elevation: 200 m (660 ft)
- Highest elevation: 241 m (791 ft)
- Lowest elevation: 105 m (344 ft)
- Population (2023): 168
  - Density: 25.3/km^{2} (65.4/sq mi)
- Time zone: UTC+01:00 (CET)
  - Summer (DST): UTC+02:00 (CEST)
- INSEE/Postal code: 30264 /30360
- ^{1} French Land Register data, which excludes lakes, ponds, glaciers > 1 km^{2} (0.386 sq mi or 247 acres) and river estuaries.

Saint-Jean-de-Ceyrargues (French pronunciation: [sɛ̃ ʒɑ̃ də seʁaʁɡ]; Occitan: Sent Joan de Ceirargues) is a commune in the Gard department in southern France.

== Population ==
Historical population
Year	Pop.	±% p.a.
1968	136	—
1975	109	−3.11%
1982	117	+1.02%
1990	155	+3.58%
1999	156	+0.07%
2007	162	+0.47%
2012	162	+0.00%
2017	164	+0.25%
2023	168	+0.40%
Source: INSEE

== See also ==
- Communes of the Gard department
