= Saint-Maurice-de-Cazevieille =

- Commune
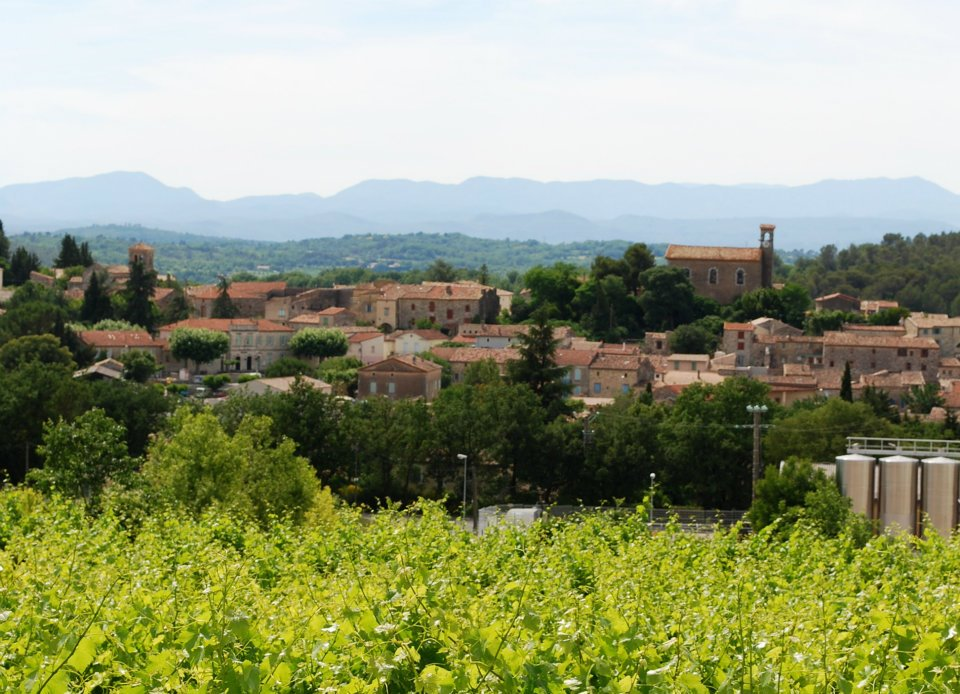
- A general view of Saint-Maurice-de-Cazevieille

- Coat of arms
- Location of Saint-Maurice-de-Cazevieille
- Location within France Location within Occitanie
- Coordinates: 44°01′58″N 4°14′01″E
- Country: France
- Region: Occitania
- Department: Gard
- Arrondissement: Alès
- Canton: Alès-3
- Intercommunality: Alès Agglomération

Government
  - Mayor (2020–2026): David Guiraud
- Area^{1}: 13.15 km^{2} (5.08 sq mi)
- Elevation: 142 m (466 ft)
- Highest elevation: 212 m (696 ft)
- Lowest elevation: 99 m (325 ft)
- Population (2023): 753
  - Density: 57.3/km^{2} (148/sq mi)
- Time zone: UTC+01:00 (CET)
  - Summer (DST): UTC+02:00 (CEST)
- INSEE/Postal code: 30285 /30360
- ^{1} French Land Register data, which excludes lakes, ponds, glaciers > 1 km^{2} (0.386 sq mi or 247 acres) and river estuaries.

Saint-Maurice-de-Cazevieille (French: [sɛ̃ mɔʁis də kazvjɛj]; Occitan: Sent Maurici de Casasvièlhas, lit. 'Saint-Maurice of Old Houses') is a commune in the Gard department in southern France.

== Population ==
Historical population
Year	Pop.	±% p.a.
1968	415	—
1975	431	+0.54%
1982	447	+0.52%
1990	505	+1.54%
1999	478	−0.61%
2007	598	+2.84%
2012	679	+2.57%
2017	727	+1.38%
2023	753	+0.59%
Source: INSEE

== See also ==
- Communes of the Gard department
