= Euzet =

- Commune
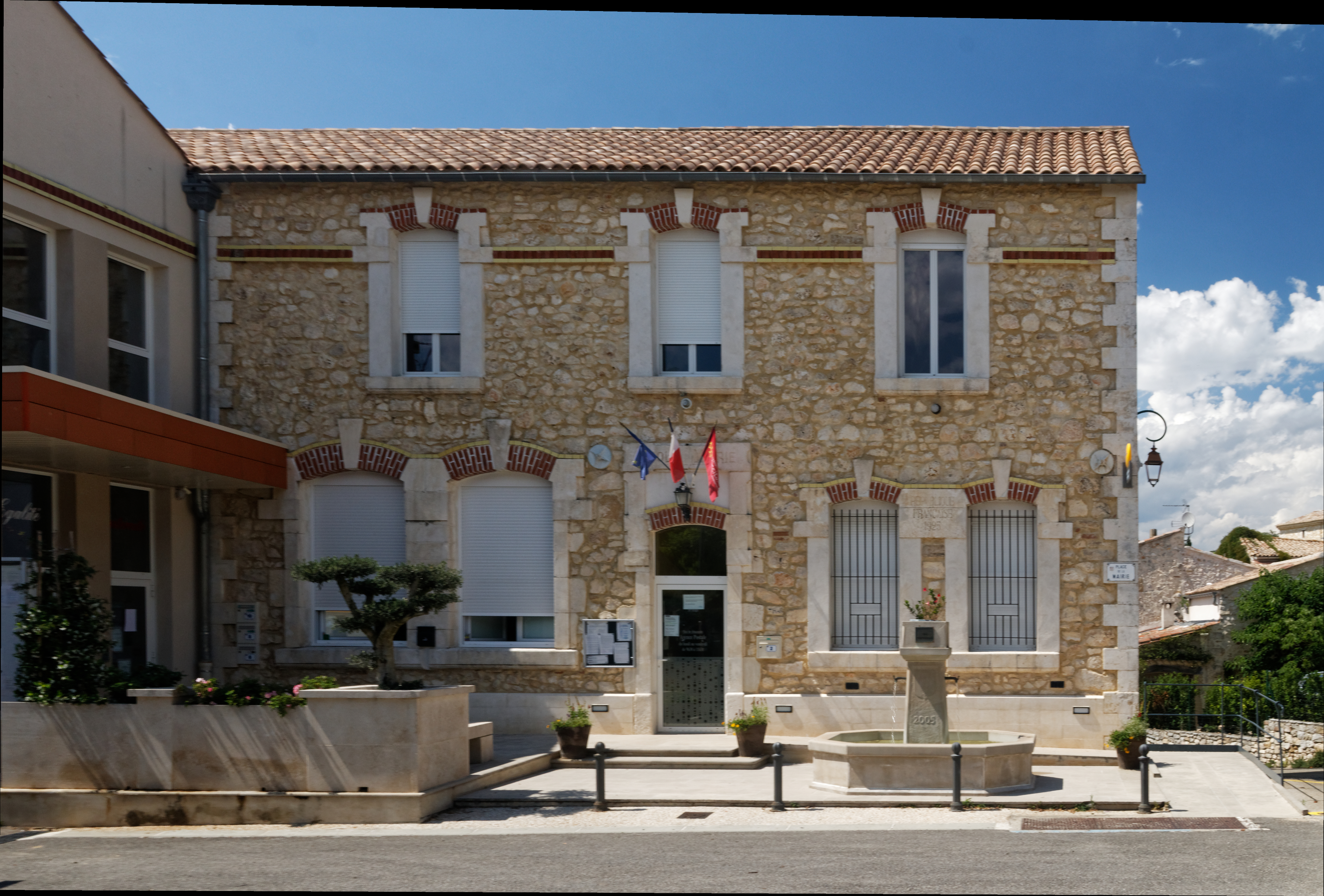
- Town hall

- Coat of arms
- Location of Euzet
- Location within France Location within Occitanie
- Coordinates: 44°04′36″N 4°14′05″E
- Country: France
- Region: Occitania
- Department: Gard
- Arrondissement: Alès
- Canton: Alès-3
- Intercommunality: Alès Agglomération

Government
  - Mayor (2020–2026): Cyril Ozil
- Area^{1}: 6.81 km^{2} (2.63 sq mi)
- Elevation: 160 m (520 ft)
- Highest elevation: 319 m (1,047 ft)
- Lowest elevation: 115 m (377 ft)
- Population (2023): 510
  - Density: 75/km^{2} (190/sq mi)
- Time zone: UTC+01:00 (CET)
  - Summer (DST): UTC+02:00 (CEST)
- INSEE/Postal code: 30109 /30360
- ^{1} French Land Register data, which excludes lakes, ponds, glaciers > 1 km^{2} (0.386 sq mi or 247 acres) and river estuaries.

Euzet (French pronunciation: [øzɛ]; Occitan: Euset) is a commune in the Gard department in southern France.

== Population ==
Historical population
| Year | Pop. | ±% p.a. |
|---|---|---|
| 1968 | 201 | — |
| 1975 | 199 | −0.14% |
| 1982 | 213 | +0.98% |
| 1990 | 268 | +2.91% |
| 1999 | 271 | +0.12% |
| 2007 | 373 | +4.07% |
| 2012 | 406 | +1.71% |
| 2017 | 439 | +1.58% |
| 2023 | 510 | +2.53% |
Source: INSEE

== See also ==
- Communes of the Gard department
- Occitania (administrative region)
