= Saint-Césaire-de-Gauzignan =

- Commune
- Coat of arms
- Location of Saint-Césaire-de-Gauzignan
- Location within France Location within Occitanie
- Coordinates: 44°01′50″N 4°12′20″E
- Country: France
- Region: Occitania
- Department: Gard
- Arrondissement: Alès
- Canton: Alès-3
- Intercommunality: Alès Agglomération

Government
  - Mayor (2020–2026): Frédéric Gras
- Area^{1}: 6.84 km^{2} (2.64 sq mi)
- Elevation: 87 m (285 ft)
- Highest elevation: 202 m (663 ft)
- Lowest elevation: 86 m (282 ft)
- Population (2023): 391
  - Density: 57.2/km^{2} (148/sq mi)
- Time zone: UTC+01:00 (CET)
  - Summer (DST): UTC+02:00 (CEST)
- INSEE/Postal code: 30240 /30360
- ^{1} French Land Register data, which excludes lakes, ponds, glaciers > 1 km^{2} (0.386 sq mi or 247 acres) and river estuaries.

Saint-Césaire-de-Gauzignan (French pronunciation: [sɛ̃ sezɛʁ də ɡoziɲɑ̃]; Occitan: Sent Cesari de Grasinhan) is a commune in the Gard department in southern France.

== Population ==
Historical population
| Year | Pop. | ±% p.a. |
|---|---|---|
| 1968 | 201 | — |
| 1975 | 194 | −0.51% |
| 1982 | 211 | +1.21% |
| 1990 | 212 | +0.06% |
| 1999 | 224 | +0.61% |
| 2007 | 268 | +2.27% |
| 2012 | 318 | +3.48% |
| 2017 | 382 | +3.74% |
| 2023 | 391 | +0.39% |
Source: INSEE

== See also ==
- Communes of the Gard department
