= Saint-Hilaire-de-Brethmas =

- Commune
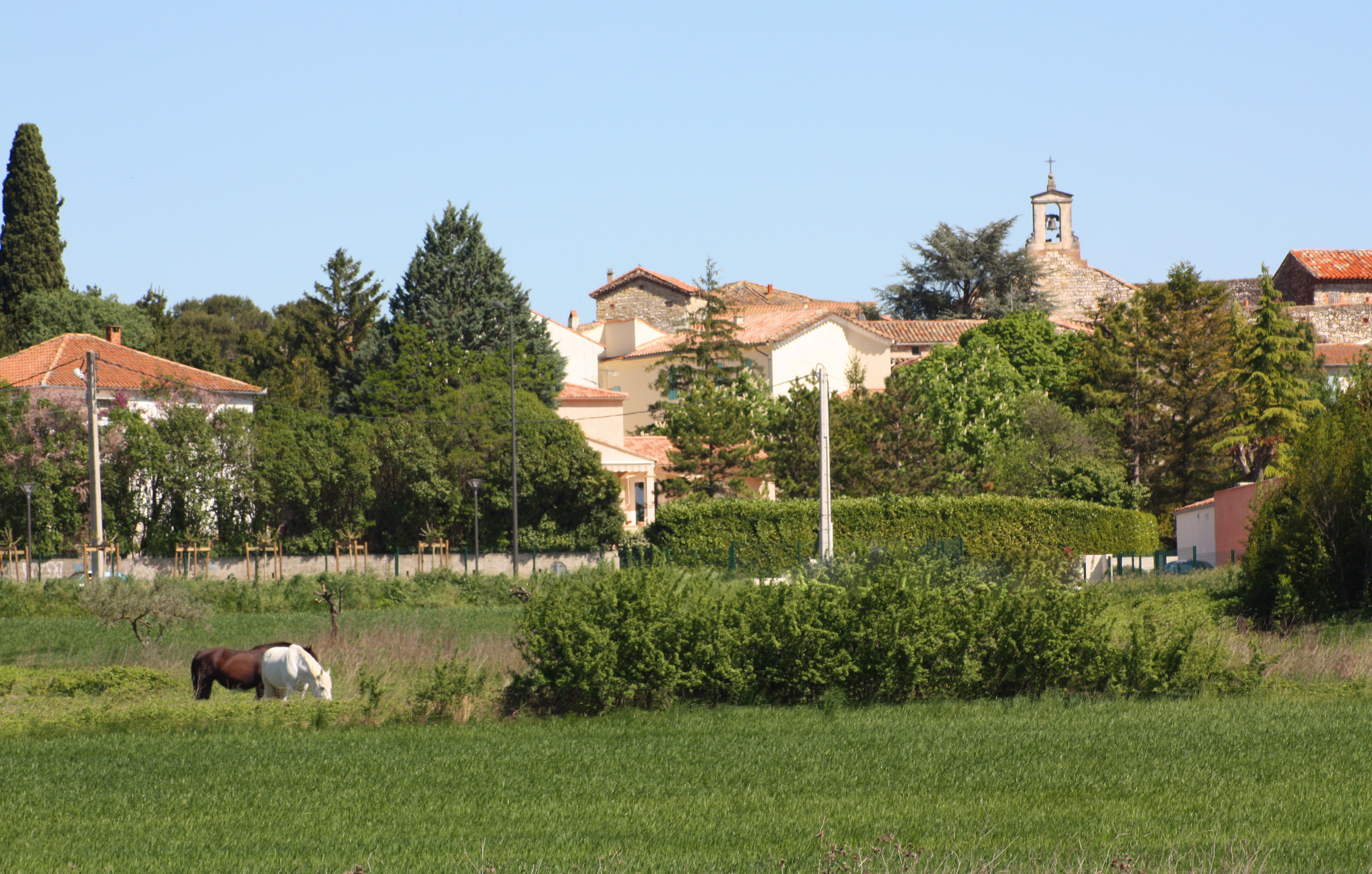
- A general view of Saint-Hilaire-de-Brethmas

- Coat of arms
- Location of Saint-Hilaire-de-Brethmas
- Location within France Location within Occitanie
- Coordinates: 44°04′54″N 4°07′33″E
- Country: France
- Region: Occitania
- Department: Gard
- Arrondissement: Alès
- Canton: Alès-3
- Intercommunality: Alès Agglomération

Government
  - Mayor (2020–2026): Jean-Michel Perret
- Area^{1}: 13.91 km^{2} (5.37 sq mi)
- Elevation: 116 m (381 ft)
- Highest elevation: 202 m (663 ft)
- Lowest elevation: 107 m (351 ft)
- Population (2023): 4,670
  - Density: 336/km^{2} (870/sq mi)
- Time zone: UTC+01:00 (CET)
  - Summer (DST): UTC+02:00 (CEST)
- INSEE/Postal code: 30259 /30560
- ^{1} French Land Register data, which excludes lakes, ponds, glaciers > 1 km^{2} (0.386 sq mi or 247 acres) and river estuaries.

Saint-Hilaire-de-Brethmas (French pronunciation: [sɛ̃.t‿ilɛʁ də bʁɛtmas]; Occitan: Sent Alari de Bretmàs) is a commune in the Gard department in southern France.

== Population ==
Historical population

| Year | Pop. | ±% p.a. |
|---|---|---|
| 1793 | 650 | — |
| 1821 | 620 | −0.17% |
| 1846 | 868 | +1.35% |
| 1872 | 959 | +0.38% |
| 1901 | 1,034 | +0.26% |
| 1926 | 1,162 | +0.47% |
| 1946 | 1,293 | +0.54% |
| 1962 | 2,022 | +2.83% |
| 1968 | 2,413 | +2.99% |

| Year | Pop. | ±% p.a. |
|---|---|---|
| 1975 | 2,761 | +1.94% |
| 1982 | 2,843 | +0.42% |
| 1990 | 3,470 | +2.52% |
| 1999 | 3,619 | +0.47% |
| 2007 | 4,118 | +1.63% |
| 2012 | 4,253 | +0.65% |
| 2017 | 4,313 | +0.28% |
| 2023 | 4,670 | +1.33% |

Source: EHESS and INSEE (1968-2023)

== See also ==
- Communes of the Gard department
