= Cantons of the Gard department =

The following is a list of the 23 cantons of the Gard department, in France, following the French canton reorganisation which came into effect in March 2015:

- Aigues-Mortes
- Alès-1
- Alès-2
- Alès-3
- Bagnols-sur-Cèze
- Beaucaire
- Calvisson
- La Grand-Combe
- Marguerittes
- Nîmes-1
- Nîmes-2
- Nîmes-3
- Nîmes-4
- Pont-Saint-Esprit
- Quissac
- Redessan
- Roquemaure
- Rousson
- Saint-Gilles
- Uzès
- Vauvert
- Le Vigan
- Villeneuve-lès-Avignon
