= Méjannes-lès-Alès =

- Commune
- Coat of arms
- Location of Méjannes-lès-Alès
- Location within France Location within Occitanie
- Coordinates: 44°06′06″N 4°09′19″E
- Country: France
- Region: Occitania
- Department: Gard
- Arrondissement: Alès
- Canton: Alès-3
- Intercommunality: Alès Agglomération

Government
  - Mayor (2020–2026): Christian Teissier
- Area^{1}: 6.58 km^{2} (2.54 sq mi)
- Elevation: 180 m (590 ft)
- Highest elevation: 230 m (750 ft)
- Lowest elevation: 119 m (390 ft)
- Population (2023): 1,243
  - Density: 189/km^{2} (489/sq mi)
- Time zone: UTC+01:00 (CET)
  - Summer (DST): UTC+02:00 (CEST)
- INSEE/Postal code: 30165 /30340
- ^{1} French Land Register data, which excludes lakes, ponds, glaciers > 1 km^{2} (0.386 sq mi or 247 acres) and river estuaries.

Méjannes-lès-Alès (French pronunciation: [meʒan lɛ.z‿alɛs], literally Méjannes near Alès;Occitan: Mejanas d'Alès) is a commune in the Gard department in southern France.

== Population ==
Historical population
Year	Pop.	±% p.a.
1968	507	—
1975	501	−0.17%
1982	660	+4.02%
1990	810	+2.59%
1999	905	+1.24%
2007	1,042	+1.78%
2012	1,147	+1.94%
2017	1,222	+1.27%
2023	1,243	+0.28%
Source: INSEE

== See also ==
- Communes of the Gard department
