= Deaux =

- Commune
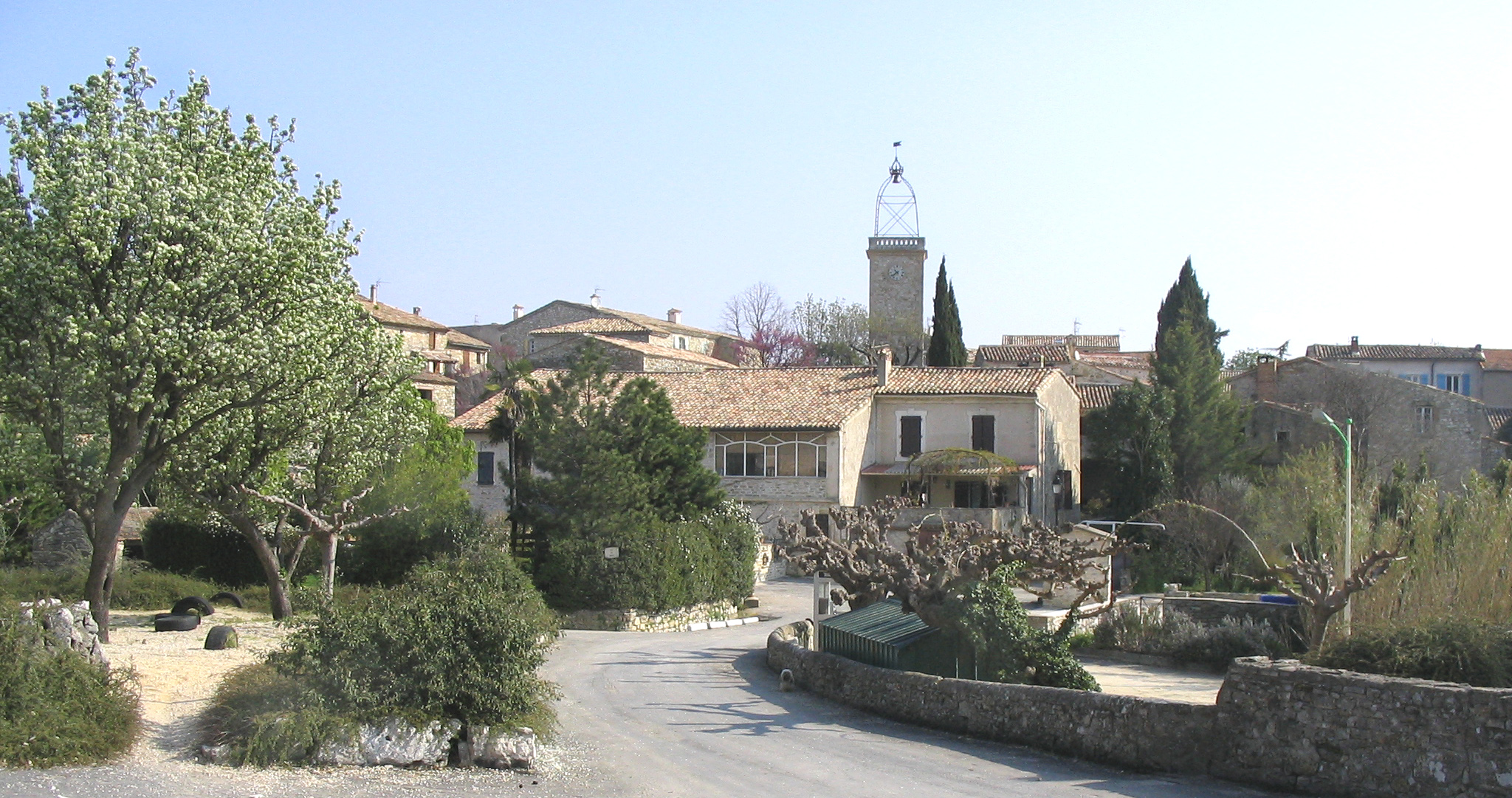
- View from the city hall

- Coat of arms
- Location of Deaux
- Location within France Location within Occitanie
- Coordinates: 44°04′03″N 4°09′03″E
- Country: France
- Region: Occitania
- Department: Gard
- Arrondissement: Alès
- Canton: Alès-3
- Intercommunality: Alès Agglomération

Government
  - Mayor (2020–2026): Didier Salles
- Area^{1}: 5.95 km^{2} (2.30 sq mi)
- Elevation: 110 m (360 ft)
- Highest elevation: 198 m (650 ft)
- Lowest elevation: 103 m (338 ft)
- Population (2023): 638
  - Density: 107/km^{2} (278/sq mi)
- Time zone: UTC+01:00 (CET)
  - Summer (DST): UTC+02:00 (CEST)
- INSEE/Postal code: 30101 /
- Dialling codes: 046683
- ^{1} French Land Register data, which excludes lakes, ponds, glaciers > 1 km^{2} (0.386 sq mi or 247 acres) and river estuaries.

Deaux (Occitan: Dòu) is a small, wooded commune in the Gard department in southern France.

== Geography ==
=== Climate ===
Deaux has a hot-summer Mediterranean climate (Köppen climate classification Csa). The average annual temperature in Deaux is 14.9 °C (58.8 °F). The average annual rainfall is 967.1 mm (38.07 in) with October as the wettest month. The temperatures are highest on average in July, at around 24.5 °C (76.1 °F), and lowest in January, at around 6.6 °C (43.9 °F). The highest temperature ever recorded in Deaux was 42.9 °C (109.2 °F) on 28 June 2019; the coldest temperature ever recorded was −9.1 °C (15.6 °F) on 5 February 2012.

Climate data for Deaux (1991−2020 normals, extremes 1988−present)
Month	Jan	Feb	Mar	Apr	May	Jun	Jul	Aug	Sep	Oct	Nov	Dec	Year
Record high °C (°F)	20.9 (69.6)	23.4 (74.1)	28.2 (82.8)	30.5 (86.9)	34.8 (94.6)	42.9 (109.2)	39.1 (102.4)	42.5 (108.5)	36.9 (98.4)	31.0 (87.8)	24.2 (75.6)	19.9 (67.8)	42.9 (109.2)
Mean daily maximum °C (°F)	10.6 (51.1)	12.2 (54.0)	16.2 (61.2)	19.0 (66.2)	23.2 (73.8)	27.9 (82.2)	31.2 (88.2)	30.8 (87.4)	25.5 (77.9)	19.8 (67.6)	14.2 (57.6)	11.0 (51.8)	20.1 (68.2)
Daily mean °C (°F)	6.6 (43.9)	7.4 (45.3)	10.8 (51.4)	13.5 (56.3)	17.4 (63.3)	21.6 (70.9)	24.5 (76.1)	24.2 (75.6)	19.7 (67.5)	15.3 (59.5)	10.2 (50.4)	7.1 (44.8)	14.9 (58.8)
Mean daily minimum °C (°F)	2.5 (36.5)	2.6 (36.7)	5.5 (41.9)	8.0 (46.4)	11.6 (52.9)	15.3 (59.5)	17.8 (64.0)	17.5 (63.5)	14.0 (57.2)	10.7 (51.3)	6.2 (43.2)	3.3 (37.9)	9.6 (49.3)
Record low °C (°F)	−8.1 (17.4)	−9.1 (15.6)	−7.7 (18.1)	−1.2 (29.8)	2.9 (37.2)	7.8 (46.0)	10.6 (51.1)	9.9 (49.8)	4.9 (40.8)	−0.1 (31.8)	−5.1 (22.8)	−8.5 (16.7)	−9.1 (15.6)
Average precipitation mm (inches)	81.0 (3.19)	53.8 (2.12)	61.0 (2.40)	79.5 (3.13)	70.0 (2.76)	49.5 (1.95)	36.5 (1.44)	43.4 (1.71)	137.1 (5.40)	149.4 (5.88)	125.0 (4.92)	80.9 (3.19)	967.1 (38.07)
Average precipitation days (≥ 1.0 mm)	7.2	5.0	5.2	7.1	7.1	5.0	3.5	4.3	5.5	8.2	8.4	6.9	73.5
Source: Météo-France

== See also ==
- Communes of the Gard department
