= Monteils, Gard =

Monteils
- Commune
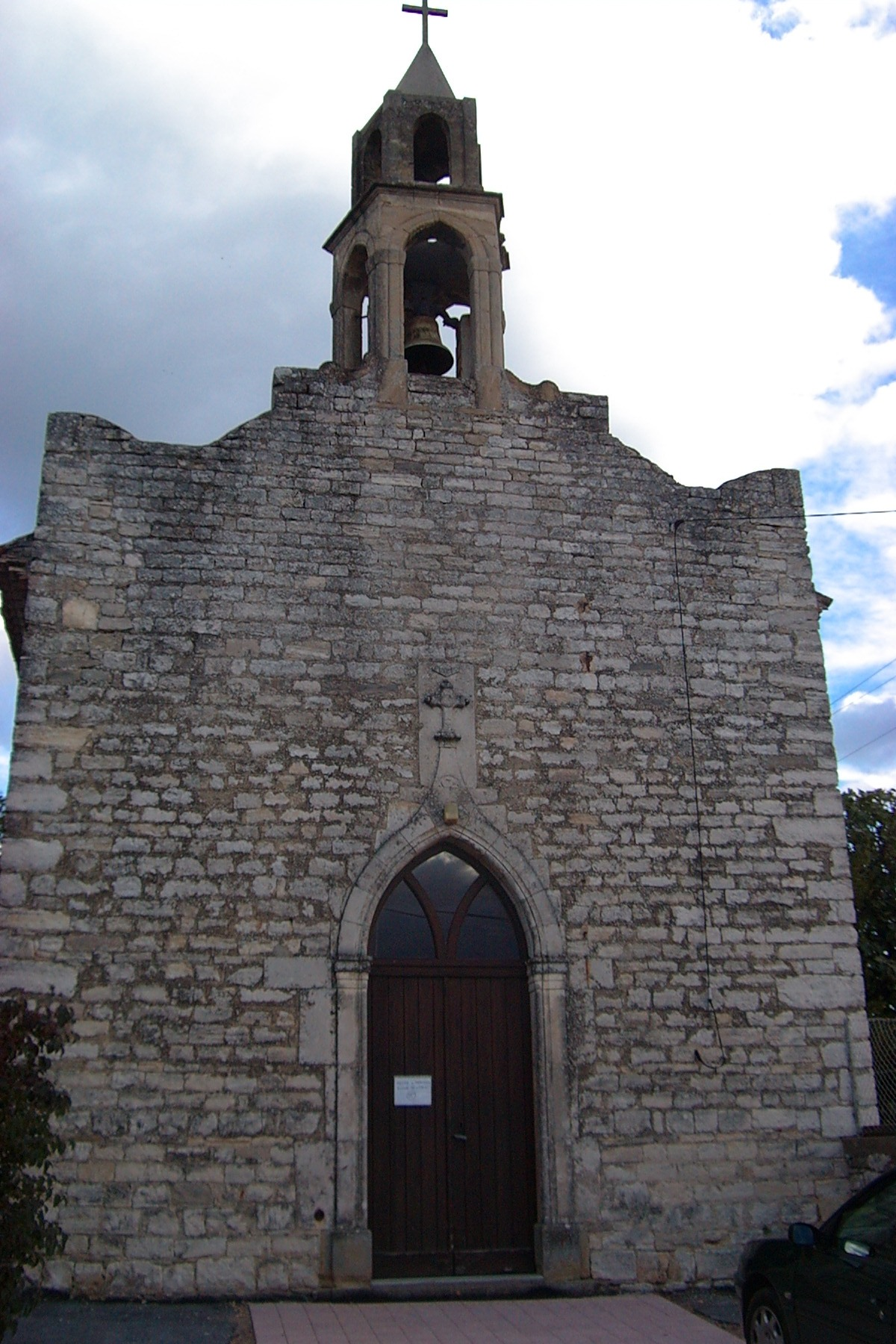
- The church of Monteils

- Coat of arms
- Location of Monteils
- Location within France Location within Occitanie
- Coordinates: 44°05′24″N 4°10′56″E
- Country: France
- Region: Occitania
- Department: Gard
- Arrondissement: Alès
- Canton: Alès-3
- Intercommunality: Alès Agglomération

Government
  - Mayor (2020–2026): Patrick Fontaine
- Area^{1}: 6.98 km^{2} (2.69 sq mi)
- Elevation: 191 m (627 ft)
- Highest elevation: 248 m (814 ft)
- Lowest elevation: 117 m (384 ft)
- Population (2023): 692
  - Density: 99.1/km^{2} (257/sq mi)
- Time zone: UTC+01:00 (CET)
  - Summer (DST): UTC+02:00 (CEST)
- INSEE/Postal code: 30177 /30360
- ^{1} French Land Register data, which excludes lakes, ponds, glaciers > 1 km^{2} (0.386 sq mi or 247 acres) and river estuaries.

Monteils (French pronunciation: [mɔ̃tɛj]; Occitan: Montelhs) is a commune in the Gard department in southern France.

== Population ==
Historical population
Year	Pop.	±% p.a.
1968	106	—
1975	142	+4.27%
1982	200	+5.01%
1990	324	+6.22%
1999	399	+2.34%
2007	569	+4.54%
2012	638	+2.32%
2017	656	+0.56%
2023	692	+0.89%
Source: INSEE

== See also ==
- Communes of the Gard department
