= Annie Chapelier =

French politician (born 1967)

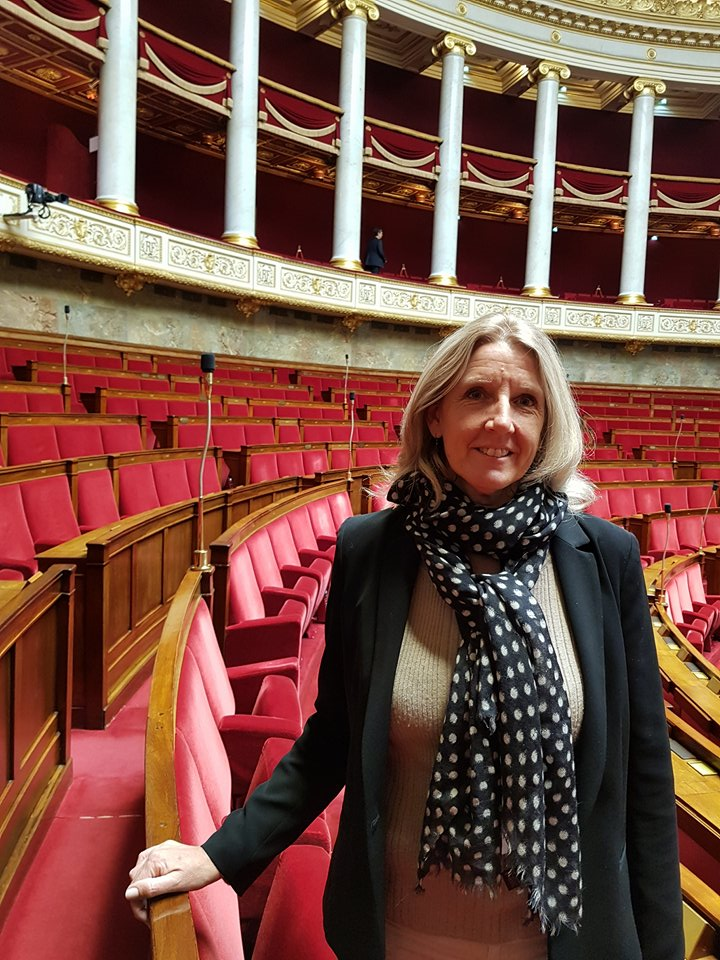

Member of the French National Assembly for Gard's 4th constituency
- In office 21 June 2017 – 21 June 2022
- Preceded by: Fabrice Verdier
- Succeeded by: Pierre Meurin

Personal details
- Born: 7 November 1967 (age 58) Windsor, Ontario, Canada
- Party: La République En Marche! (2017–2020)

Annie Chapelier (born 7 November 1967) is a French nurse anesthetist and politician who served as a member of the French National Assembly from 2017 to 2022, representing the department of Gard. From 2017 until 2020, she was a member of La République En Marche! (LREM). In May 2020, she was one of the 17 initial members of the short-lived Ecology Democracy Solidarity group.

== Political career ==
In parliament, Chapelier served on the Committee on Foreign Affairs. In addition to her committee assignments, she chaired the French Parliamentary Friendship Group with South Sudan.

Chapelier did not seek re-election in the 2022 French legislative election.

== Political positions ==
In 2018, Chapelier joined other co-signatories around Sébastien Nadot in officially filing a request for a commission of inquiry into the legality of French weapons sales to the Saudi-led coalition fighting in Yemen, days before an official visit of Saudi Crown Prince Mohammed bin Salman to Paris.

In June 2019, Chapelier was one of five members of the LREM parliamentary group who joined a cross-party initiative to legalize the distribution and use of cannabis.

In July 2019, Chapelier voted in favour of the French ratification of the European Union’s Comprehensive Economic and Trade Agreement (CETA) with Canada.

== See also ==
- 2017 French legislative election
