= Vézénobres =

Vézénobres Vesenòbre (Occitan)
- Commune
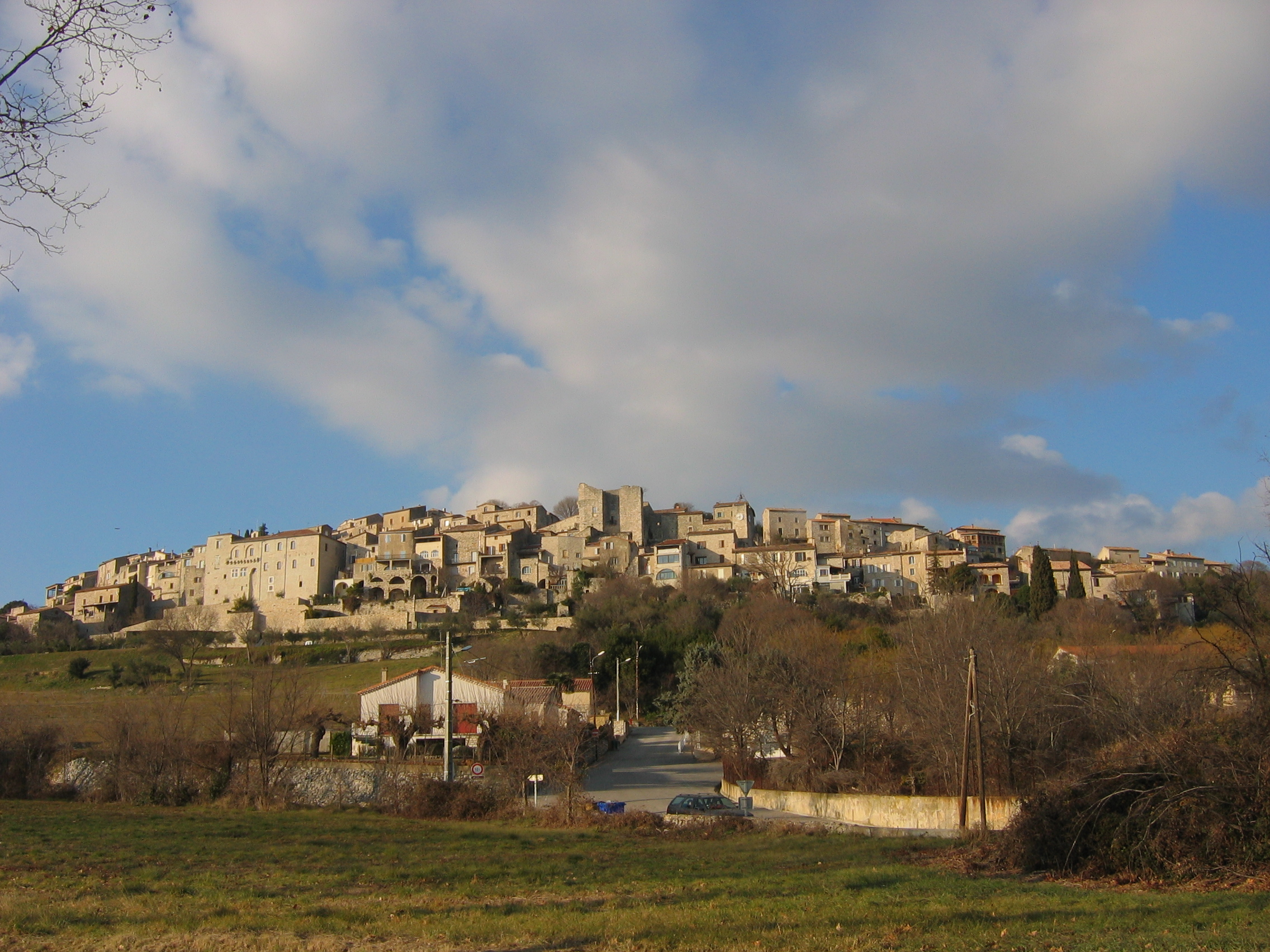
- A general view of Vézénobres

- Coat of arms
- Location of Vézénobres
- Location within France Location within Occitanie
- Coordinates: 44°03′07″N 4°08′35″E
- Country: France
- Region: Occitania
- Department: Gard
- Arrondissement: Alès
- Canton: Alès-3
- Intercommunality: Alès Agglomération

Government
  - Mayor (2020–2026): Sébastien Ombras
- Area^{1}: 17.07 km^{2} (6.59 sq mi)
- Elevation: 110 m (360 ft)
- Highest elevation: 219 m (719 ft)
- Lowest elevation: 84 m (276 ft)
- Population (2023): 1,865
  - Density: 109.3/km^{2} (283.0/sq mi)
- Time zone: UTC+01:00 (CET)
  - Summer (DST): UTC+02:00 (CEST)
- INSEE/Postal code: 30348 /30360
- ^{1} French Land Register data, which excludes lakes, ponds, glaciers > 1 km^{2} (0.386 sq mi or 247 acres) and river estuaries.

Vézénobres (French pronunciation: [vezenɔbʁ]; Occitan: Vesenòbre) is a commune in the Gard department in the Occitania region in Southern France.

== History ==
Vézénobres is a medieval town that is known for the intense religious wars that lasted a few centuries. It was home to many Protestant leaders, namely, those who were directly involved in the Carmisard wars. Eventually the Catholic Dragoons invaded and killed all of them and they were buried in the walls of their own houses.

== Demographics ==
Historical population
Year	Pop.	±% p.a.
1968	914	—
1975	1,056	+2.08%
1982	1,092	+0.48%
1990	1,312	+2.32%
1999	1,391	+0.65%
2007	1,663	+2.26%
2012	1,733	+0.83%
2017	1,774	+0.47%
2023	1,865	+0.84%
Source: INSEE

== Personalities ==
The English rock singer Mick Jagger (of the Rolling Stones) bought a house in the village in 1978. He only remained there for a few months.

== See also ==
- Communes of the Gard department
