= Arrondissements of the Gard department =

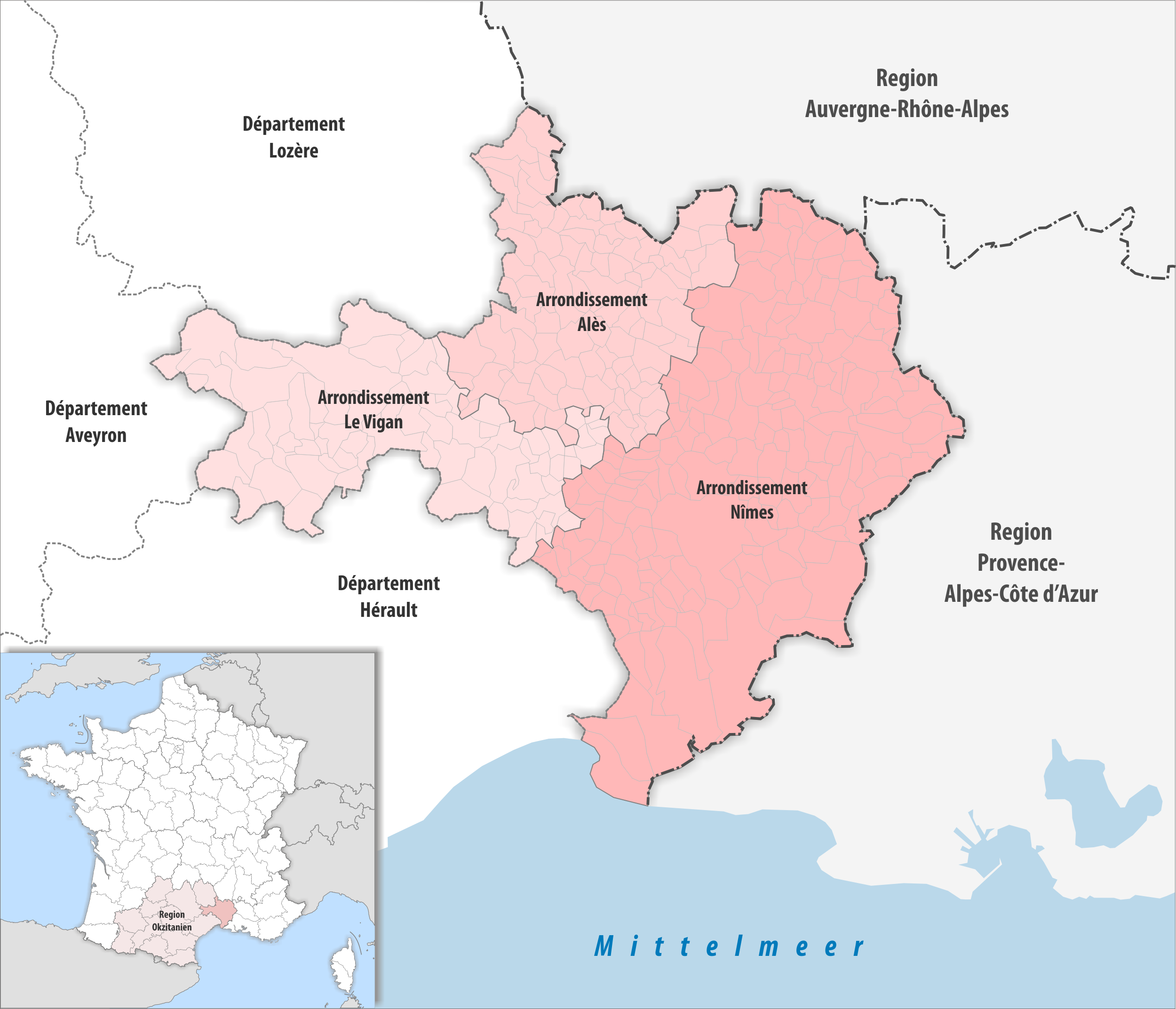
Map of arrondissements of the Gard department.

The 3 arrondissements of the Gard department are:

1. Arrondissement of Alès, (subprefecture: Alès) with 96 communes. The population of the arrondissement was 153,189 in 2021.
2. Arrondissement of Nîmes, (prefecture of the Gard department: Nîmes) with 181 communes. The population of the arrondissement was 564,024 in 2021.
3. Arrondissement of Le Vigan, (subprefecture: Le Vigan) with 74 communes. The population of the arrondissement was 39,330 in 2021.

== History ==
In 1800 the arrondissements of Nîmes, Alès, Uzès and Le Vigan were established. The arrondissement of Uzès was disbanded in 1926.

The borders of the arrondissements of Gard were modified in January 2017:

- two communes from the arrondissement of Alès to the arrondissement of Nîmes
- six communes from the arrondissement of Alès to the arrondissement of Le Vigan
- four communes from the arrondissement of Le Vigan to the arrondissement of Alès
- one commune from the arrondissement of Le Vigan to the arrondissement of Nîmes
