= Canton of Alès-3 =

Coordinates: 44.124°N 4.079°E

The canton of Alès-3 is an administrative division of the Gard department, southern France. It was created at the French canton reorganisation which came into effect in March 2015. Its seat is in Alès.

It consists of the following communes:

1. Alès (partly)
2. Castelnau-Valence
3. Deaux
4. Euzet
5. Martignargues
6. Méjannes-lès-Alès
7. Monteils
8. Saint-Césaire-de-Gauzignan
9. Saint-Étienne-de-l'Olm
10. Saint-Hilaire-de-Brethmas
11. Saint-Hippolyte-de-Caton
12. Saint-Jean-de-Ceyrargues
13. Saint-Maurice-de-Cazevieille
14. Vézénobres
