= Pierre Meurin =

French politician

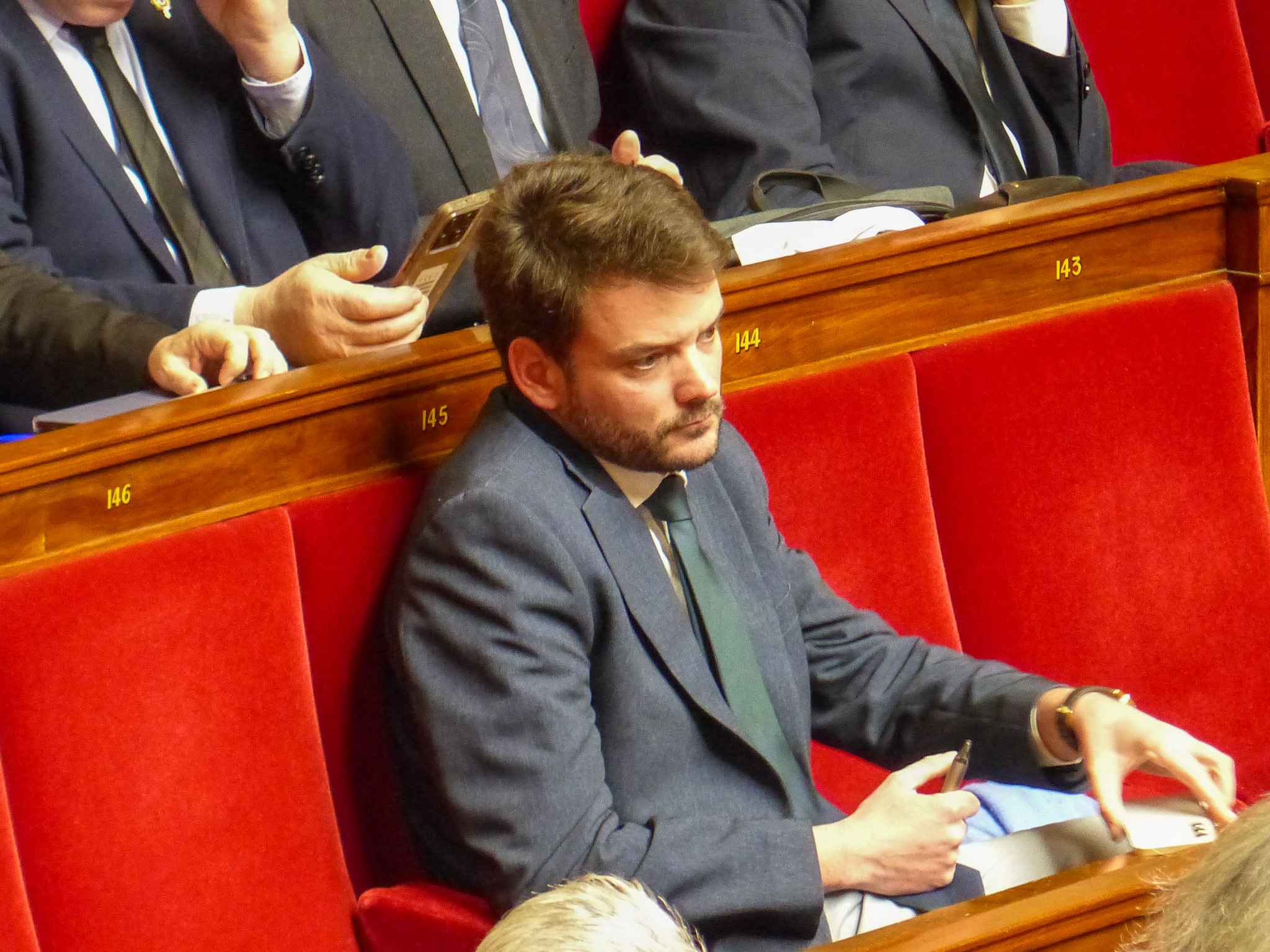

Member of the National Assembly for Gard's 4th constituency
- Incumbent
- Assumed office 22 June 2022
- Preceded by: Annie Chapelier

Personal details
- Born: 30 November 1989 (age 36) Paris, France
- Party: National Rally
- Other political affiliations: Movement for France (2008-2018); Reconquête (2021)
- Occupation: Lawyer, politician

Pierre Meurin (born 30 November 1989) is a French politician from National Rally (RN) who has represented Gard's 4th constituency in the National Assembly since 2022.

== Professional and personal life ==
Maurin was born in Paris and is the son of a construction worker who ran a window installation firm. He has two brothers and a sister. He graduated with a Master's degree in law and during his studies was active in the Union Nationale Inter-universitaire union. He served on the board of directors of the University of Versailles Saint-Quentin-en-Yvelines until 2012 and later worked at the Institut d'études politiques de Lyon until 2021.

He is married to a speech therapist with whom he has two children. Maurin has described himself as a practicing Catholic.

== Political career ==
He became a member of the Movement for France (MPF) in 2008 and chaired the MPF's youth wing Jeunes pour la France From 2014 to 2018. Maurin was an early supporter of author and pundit Eric Zemmour and caused some controversy when he booed an opponent of Zemmour's from the audience during a televised debate. In 2020, he began organising Zemmour's pre-presidential campaign ahead of the 2022 French presidential election and was a founding member of his Reconquête party. However, before the election he left the post and announced his support for Marine Le Pen in 2020, arguing that Le Pen represented the best chance of defeating the Macron administration.

During the 2022 French legislative election, he stood as the National Rally candidate in Gard's 4th constituency and defeated NUPES affiliated candidate Arnaud Bord.

== See also ==
- List of deputies of the 16th National Assembly of France
