= Gard =

Department in Occitanie, France

- Department of France
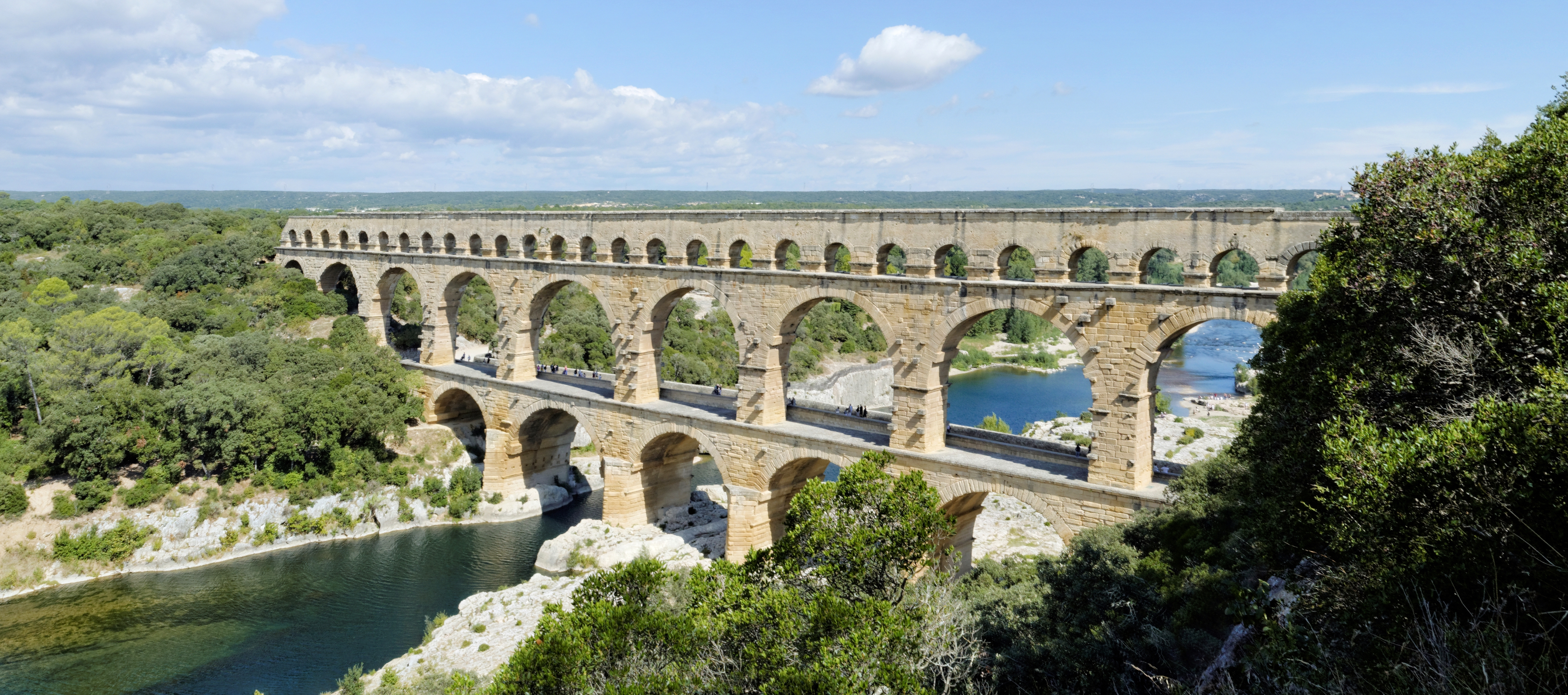
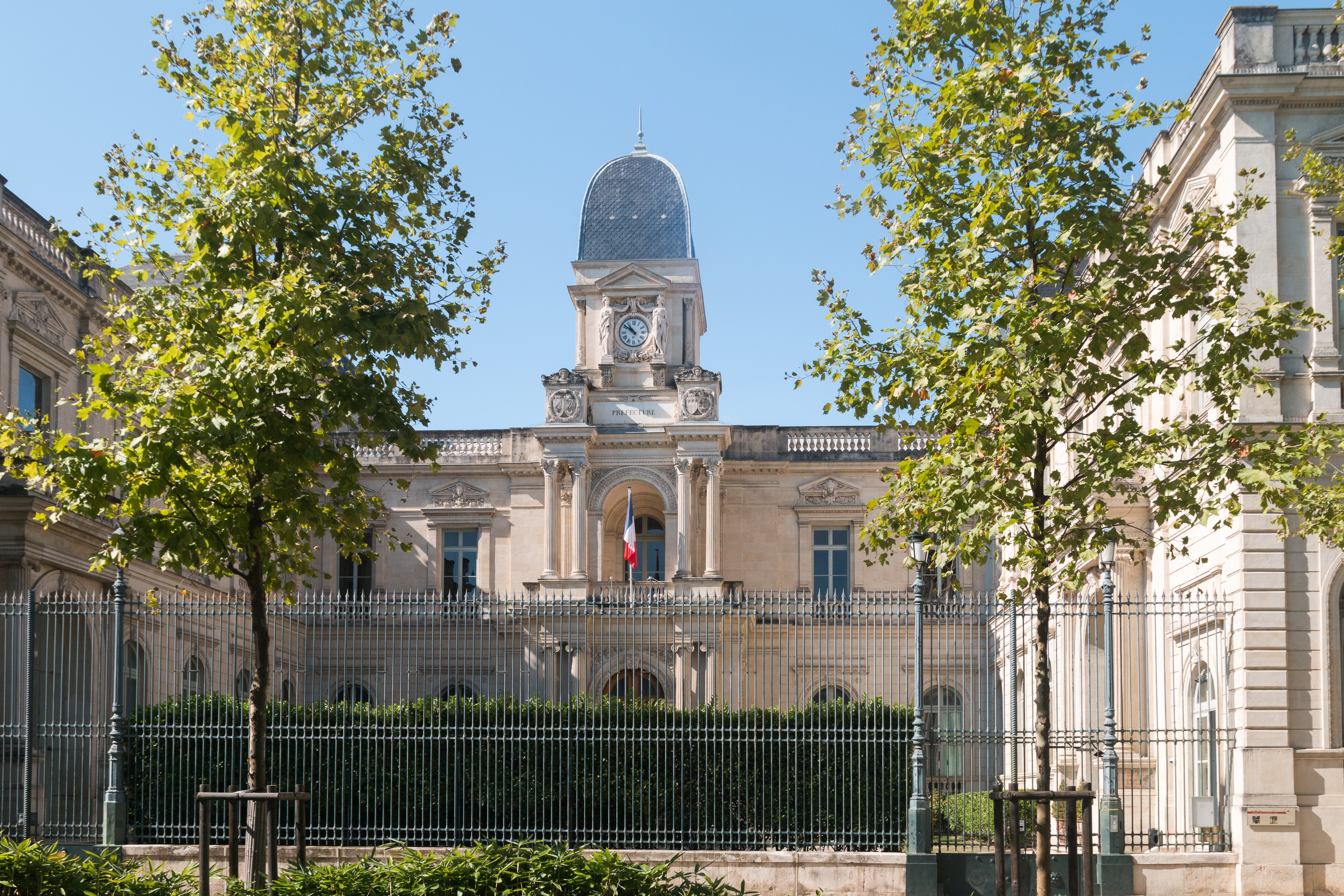
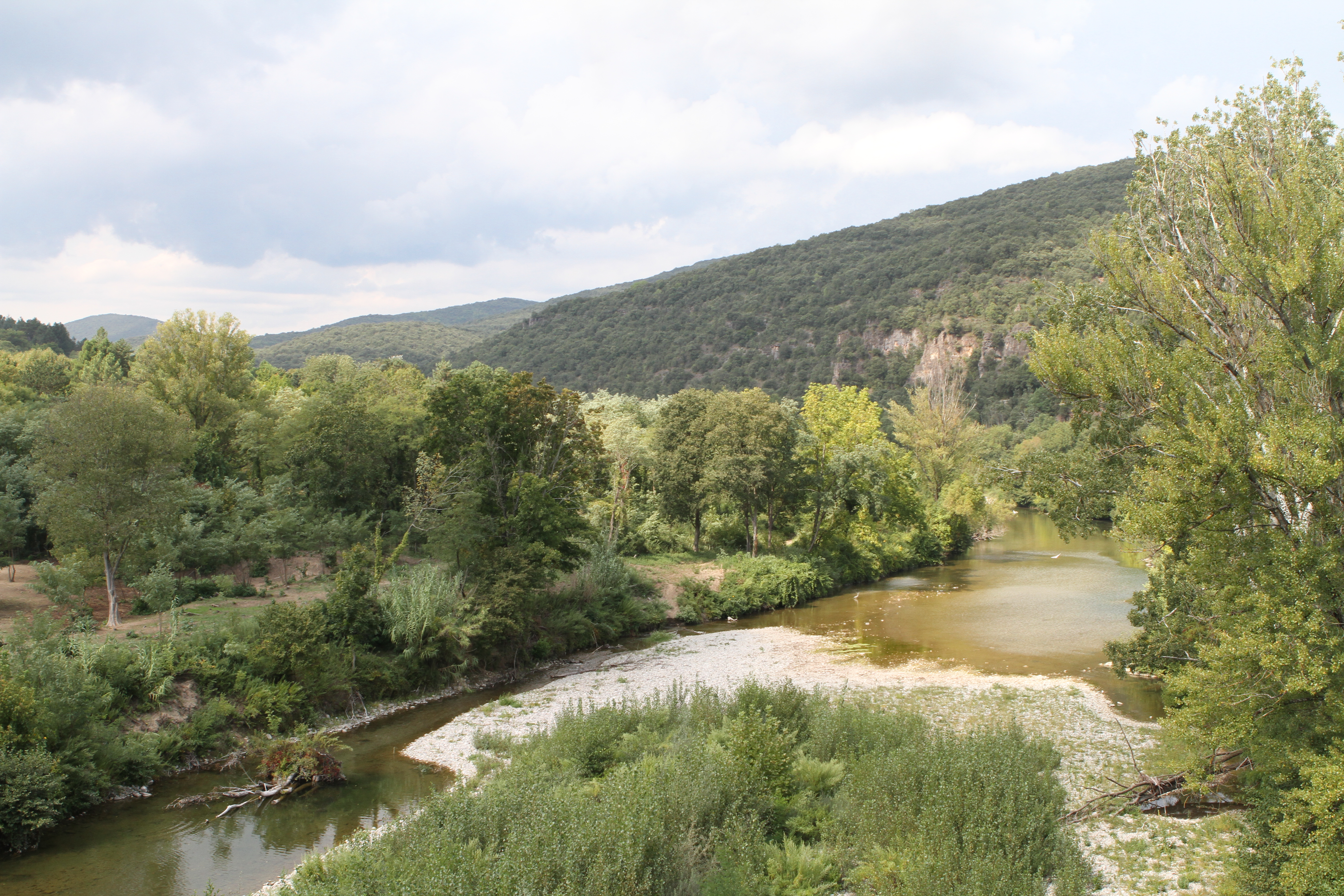
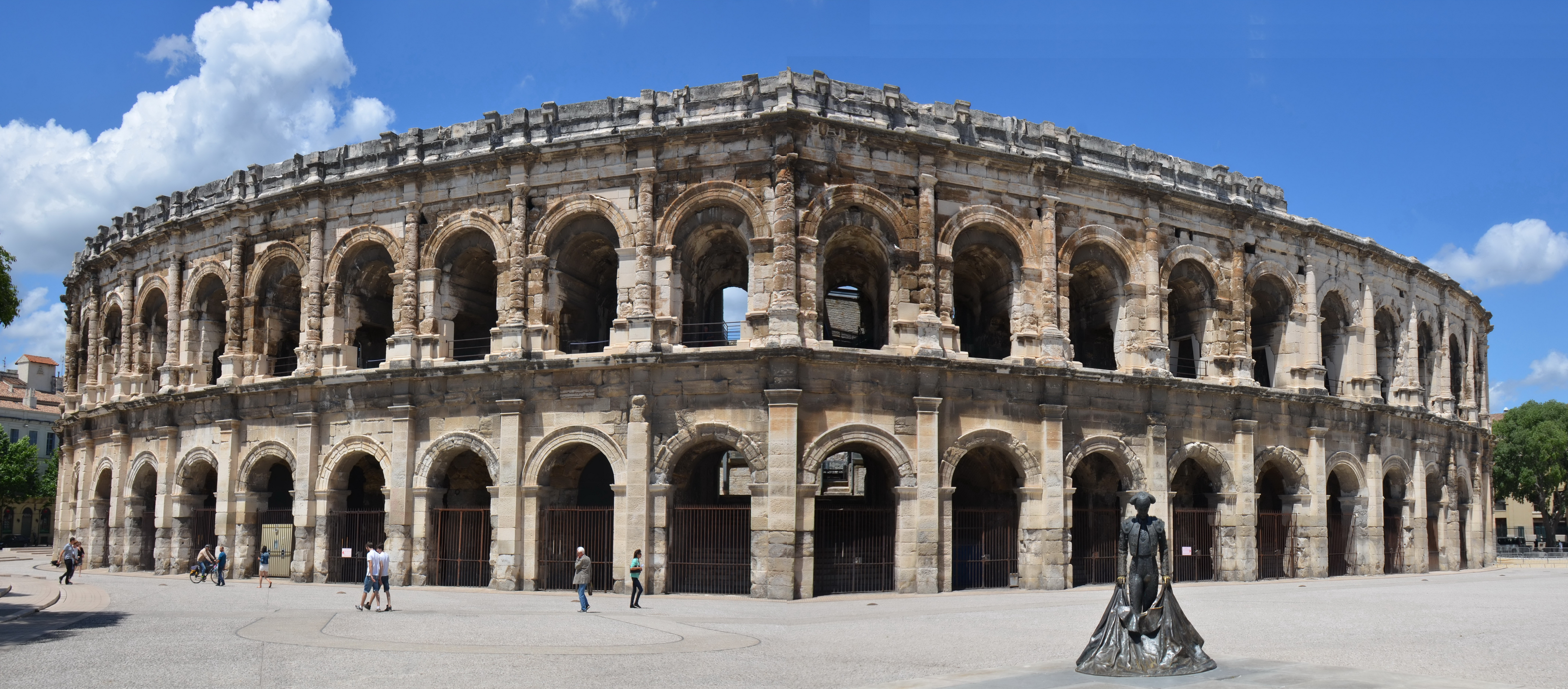
- From top down, left to right: Pont du Gard, prefecture building in Nîmes, Cévennes and Arena of Nîmes

- Flag Coat of arms

- Location of Gard in France
- Coordinates: 44°7′41″N 4°4′54″E
- Country: France
- Region: Occitanie
- Prefecture: Nîmes
- Subprefectures: Alès; Le Vigan

Government
  - President of the Departmental Council: Françoise Laurent-Perrigot (PS)

Area^{1}
  - Total: 5,853 km^{2} (2,260 sq mi)

Population (2023)
  - Total: 770,940
  - Rank: 32nd
  - Density: 131.7/km^{2} (341.1/sq mi)
- Time zone: UTC+1 (CET)
  - Summer (DST): UTC+2 (CEST)
- ISO 3166 code: FR-30
- Department number: 30
- Arrondissements: 3
- Cantons: 23
- Communes: 350
- ^1 French Land Register data, which exclude estuaries, and lakes, ponds, and glaciers larger than 1 km^{2}

Gard (French pronunciation: [ɡaʁ]) is a department in Southern France, located in the region of Occitania. It had a population of 770,940 as of 2023; its prefecture is Nîmes.

The department is named after the river Gardon. In recent decades of the twenty-first century, local administration and French speakers have returned to the original Occitan name of the river, Gard (Occitan pronunciation: [gaɾ]). It is part of a revival of Occitan culture.

== History ==
In classical times the Gard area was settled by Romans and their allies. They built the Via Domitia across the region in 118 BC. Centuries later, on 4 March 1790, the Gard was one of the original 83 departments created during the French Revolution. It comprised the eastern part of the ancient province of Languedoc.

Originally this department was to include the canton of Ganges, but Ganges was transferred to the neighbouring department of Hérault. In return, the Gard was assigned the fishing port of Aigues Mortes, which gave the department its own outlet to the Gulf of Lion on the Mediterranean.

During the middle of the nineteenth century the prefecture, traditionally a centre of commerce with a manufacturing sector focused on textiles, was an early beneficiary of railway development, becoming an important railway junction. Several luxurious hotels were built, and the improved market access provided by the railways also encouraged, initially, a rapid growth in wine growing. But many winegrowers were ruined when the vineyards were infected with phylloxera in 1872.

== Geography ==
The Gard is part of the region of Occitanie and is surrounded by the departments of Hérault, Lozère, Aveyron, Bouches-du-Rhône, Vaucluse and Ardèche. It has a short coastline to the south on the Mediterranean Sea. The highest point in the department is Mont Aigoual.

In the first quarter of the 21st century, the department has suffered serious flooding. The region has also been subject to some of the highest recorded temperatures in France's history as climate change alters summer heat.

== Demographics ==
Population development since 1791:

Historical population

Year	Pop.	±% p.a.
1791	313,464	—
1801	300,144	−0.43%
1806	322,144	+1.42%
1821	334,164	+0.24%
1831	357,283	+0.67%
1841	376,062	+0.51%
1851	408,163	+0.82%
1861	422,107	+0.34%
1872	420,131	−0.04%
1881	415,629	−0.12%
1891	419,388	+0.09%
1901	420,836	+0.03%
1911	413,458	−0.18%
1921	396,169	−0.43%

Year	Pop.	±% p.a.
1931	406,815	+0.27%
1936	395,299	−0.57%
1946	380,837	−0.37%
1954	396,742	+0.51%
1962	435,107	+1.16%
1968	478,544	+1.60%
1975	494,575	+0.47%
1982	530,478	+1.01%
1990	585,049	+1.23%
1999	623,125	+0.70%
2007	689,847	+1.28%
2012	725,618	+1.02%
2017	744,178	+0.51%
2023	770,940	+0.59%

The inhabitants of the Gard are called Gardois in French. The most populous commune is Nîmes, the prefecture. As of 2023, there are eight communes that have more than 10,000 inhabitants:

Commune	Population (2023)
Nîmes	151,839
Alès	46,125
Bagnols-sur-Cèze	18,112
Beaucaire	15,692
Saint-Gilles	14,734
Villeneuve-lès-Avignon	13,148
Vauvert	11,671
Pont-Saint-Esprit	10,958

== Politics ==
In the closely contested first round of the 2012 presidential election, the Gard was the only department to vote for the National Front candidate Marine Le Pen by a slim plurality, with 25.51% of the vote. The incumbent President Nicolas Sarkozy of the Union for a Popular Movement party received 24.86% of the vote, while Socialist candidate François Hollande received 24.11% of the vote share.

=== Departmental Council ===
The President of the Departmental Council has been Françoise Laurent-Perrigot of the Socialist Party (PS) since 2021.

Party		Seats
	The Republicans (LR)	12
•	Socialist Party (PS)	10
	Union of Democrats and Independents (UDI)	7
•	French Communist Party (PCF)	6
•	Miscellaneous left (DVG)	4
	National Rally (FN)	4
•	Europe Ecology – The Greens (EELV)	2
	Miscellaneous right (DVD)	1

=== Current members of the National Assembly ===
Constituency	Member	Party
Gard's 1st constituency	Yoann Gillet	National Rally
Gard's 2nd constituency	Nicolas Meizonnet	National Rally
Gard's 3rd constituency	Pascale Bordes	National Rally
Gard's 4th constituency	Pierre Meurin	National Rally
Gard's 5th constituency	Alexandre Allegret-Pilot	Union of the Right for the Republic
Gard's 6th constituency	Sylvie Josserand	National Rally

== Tourism ==
The Gard contains a part of the Cévennes National Park. There are important Roman architectural remains in Nîmes, as well as the famous Roman aqueduct, the Pont du Gard.

The Gard is also home to the source of Perrier, a carbonated mineral water sold both in France and internationally on a large scale. The spring and facility are located just south-east of the commune of Vergèze.

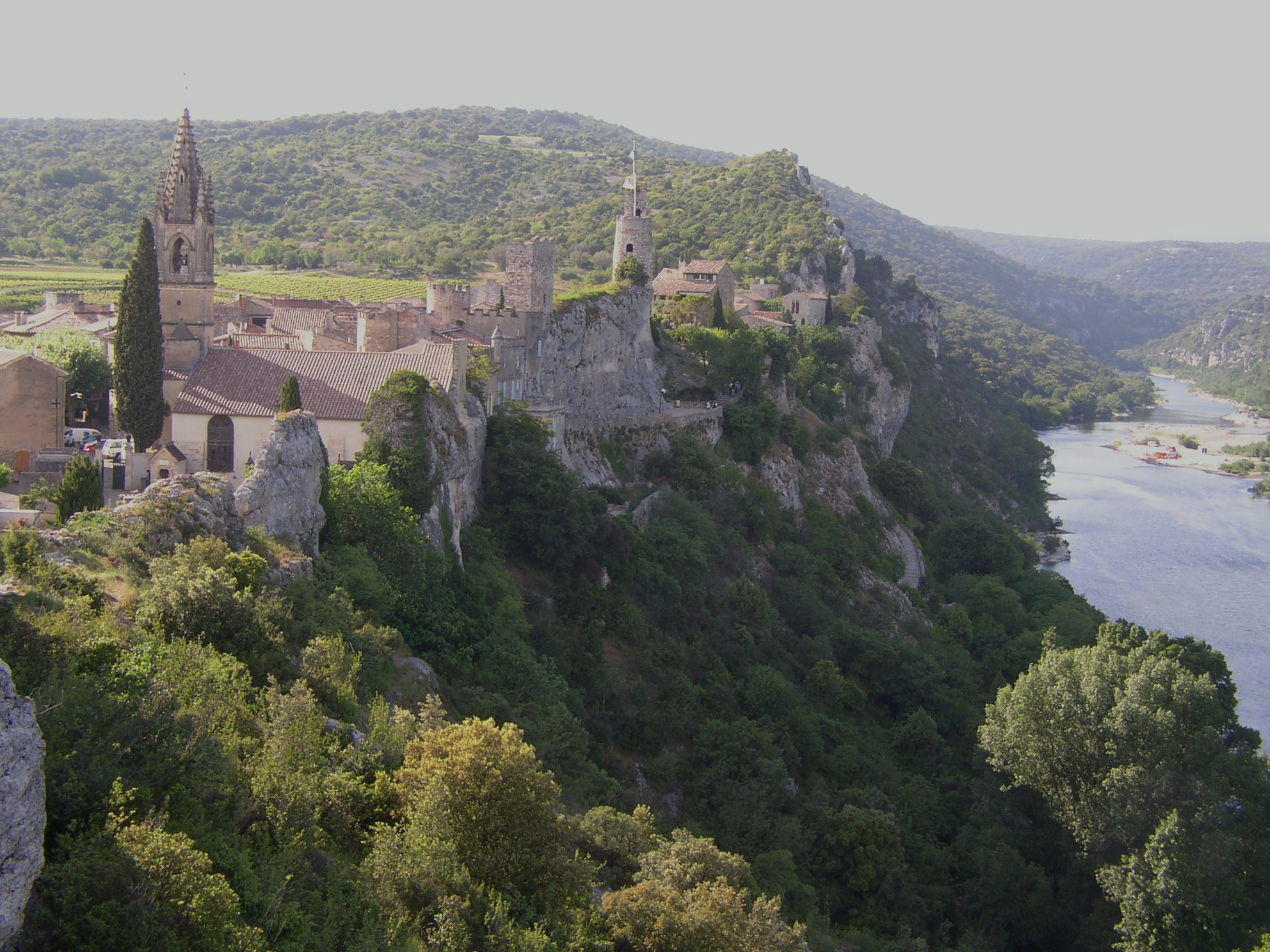
Aiguèze

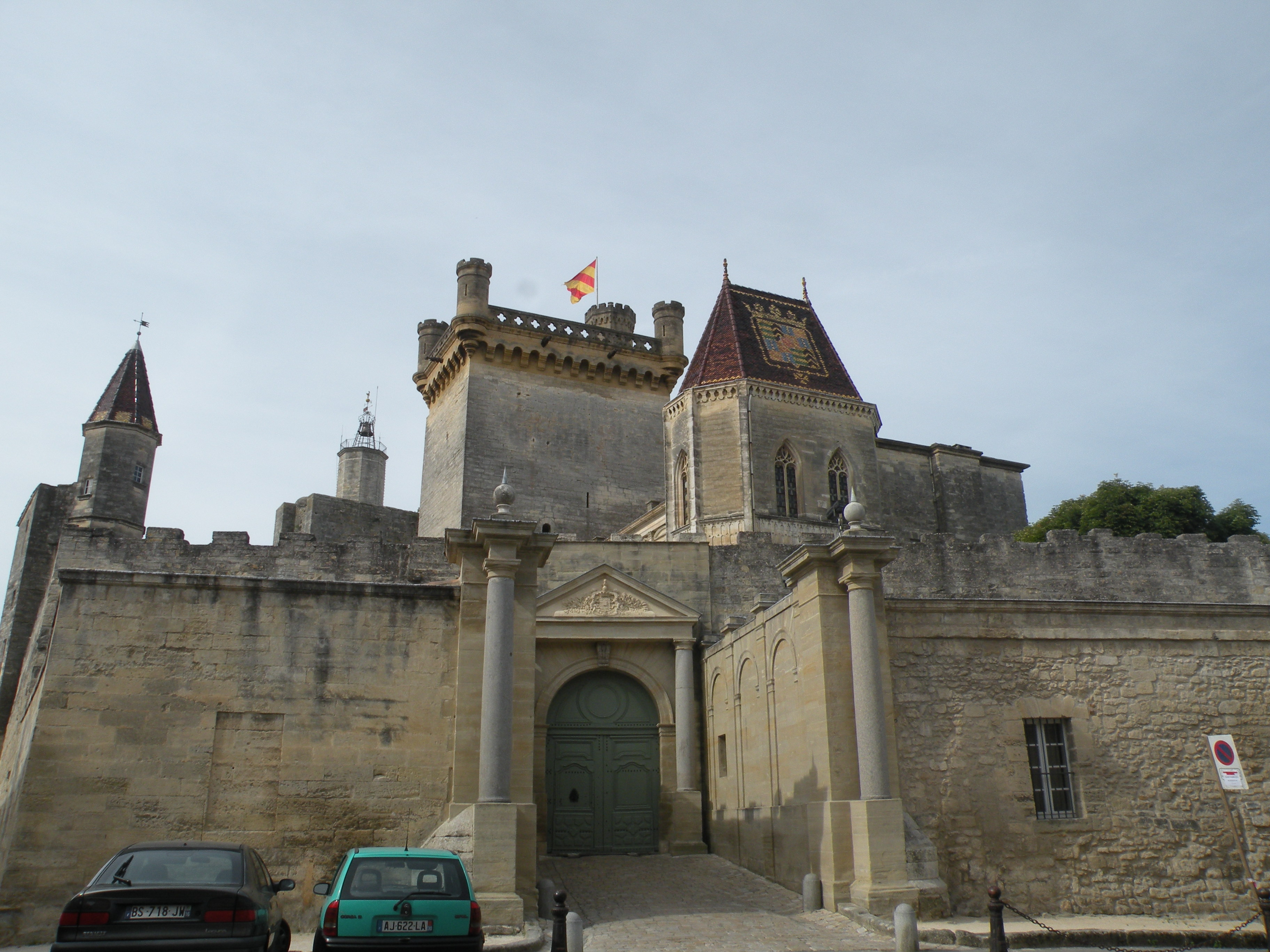
Uzès

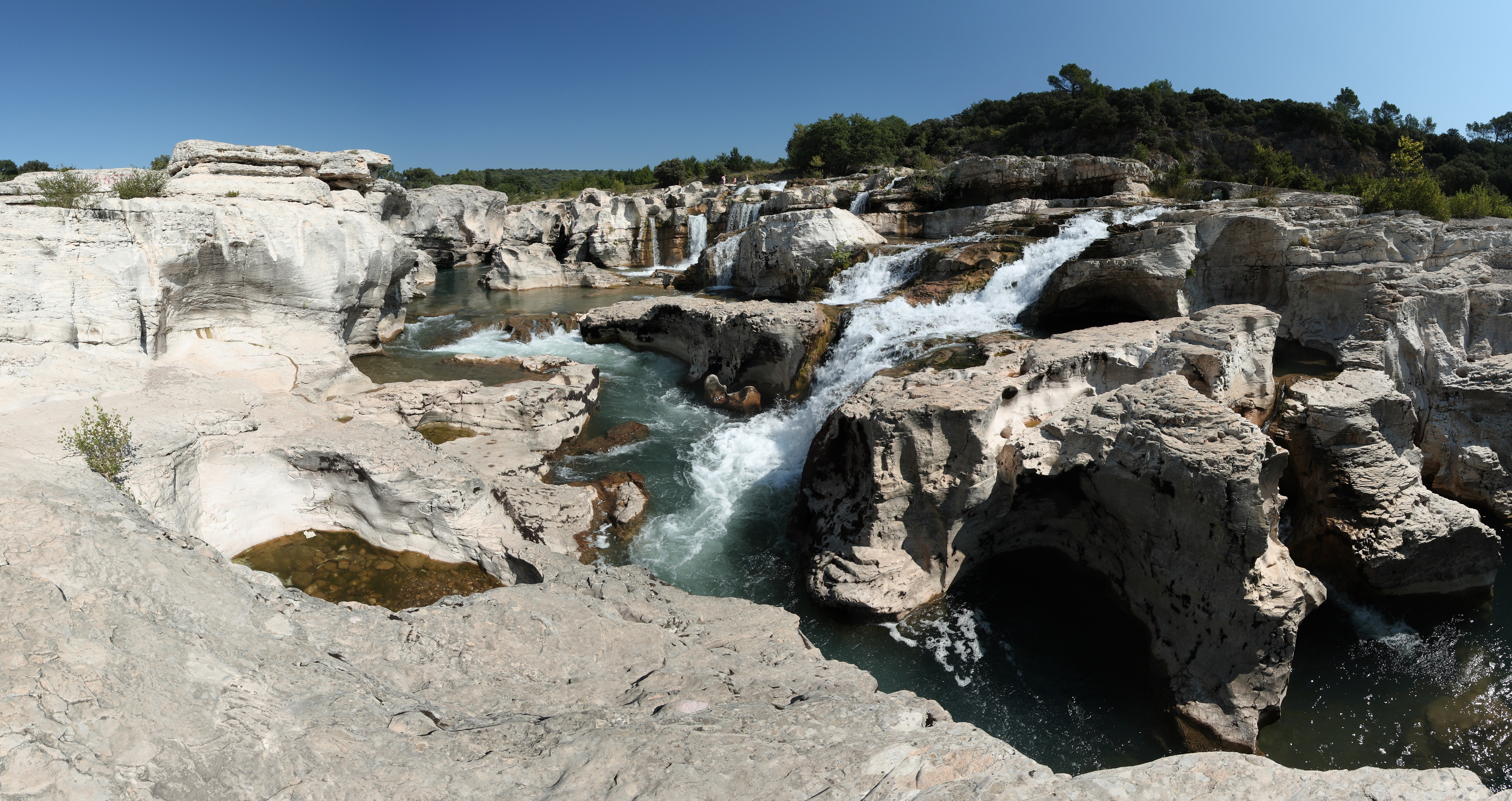
Cèze

== See also ==
- Arrondissements of the Gard department
- Cantons of the Gard department
- Communes of the Gard department
