= Arrondissement of Nîmes =

Coordinates: 43°49′49″N 4°21′22″E

Nîmes
- Arrondissement
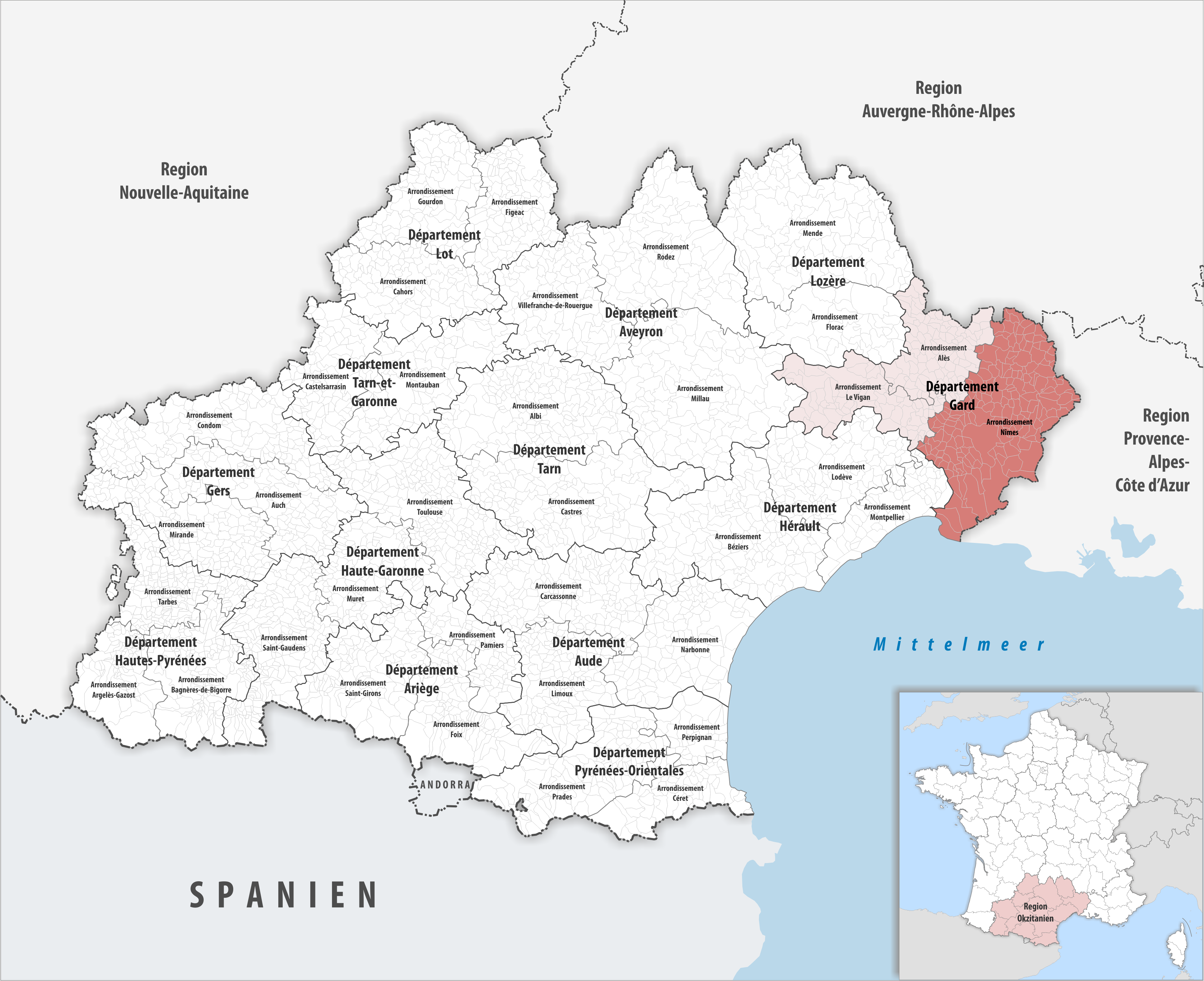
- Location within the region Occitanie
- Country: France
- Region: Occitania
- Department: Gard
- No. of communes: {{{nbcomm}}}
- Area: 3,188.3 km^{2} (1,231.0 sq mi)
- Population (2023): 574,325
  - Density: 180.14/km^{2} (466.55/sq mi)
- INSEE code: 302

The arrondissement of Nîmes is an arrondissement of France in the Gard department in the Occitanie region. It has 181 communes. Its population is 564,024 (2021), and its area is 3,188.3 km^{2} (1,231.0 sq mi).

== Composition ==
The communes of the arrondissement of Nîmes, and their INSEE codes, are:

1. Aigaliers (30001)
2. Aigues-Mortes (30003)
3. Aigues-Vives (30004)
4. Aiguèze (30005)
5. Aimargues (30006)
6. Les Angles (30011)
7. Aramon (30012)
8. Argilliers (30013)
9. Arpaillargues-et-Aureillac (30014)
10. Aspères (30018)
11. Aubais (30019)
12. Aubord (30020)
13. Aubussargues (30021)
14. Aujargues (30023)
15. Bagnols-sur-Cèze (30028)
16. Baron (30030)
17. La Bastide-d'Engras (30031)
18. Beaucaire (30032)
19. Beauvoisin (30033)
20. Bellegarde (30034)
21. Belvézet (30035)
22. Bernis (30036)
23. Bezouce (30039)
24. Blauzac (30041)
25. Boissières (30043)
26. Bouillargues (30047)
27. Bouquet (30048)
28. Bourdic (30049)
29. La Bruguière (30056)
30. Cabrières (30057)
31. Le Cailar (30059)
32. Caissargues (30060)
33. La Calmette (30061)
34. Calvisson (30062)
35. Cannes-et-Clairan (30066)
36. La Capelle-et-Masmolène (30067)
37. Carsan (30070)
38. Castillon-du-Gard (30073)
39. Caveirac (30075)
40. Cavillargues (30076)
41. Chusclan (30081)
42. Clarensac (30082)
43. Codognan (30083)
44. Codolet (30084)
45. Collias (30085)
46. Collorgues (30086)
47. Combas (30088)
48. Comps (30089)
49. Congénies (30091)
50. Connaux (30092)
51. Cornillon (30096)
52. Crespian (30098)
53. Dions (30102)
54. Domazan (30103)
55. Domessargues (30104)
56. Estézargues (30107)
57. Flaux (30110)
58. Foissac (30111)
59. Fons (30112)
60. Fons-sur-Lussan (30113)
61. Fontanès (30114)
62. Fontarèches (30115)
63. Fournès (30116)
64. Fourques (30117)
65. Gajan (30122)
66. Gallargues-le-Montueux (30123)
67. Le Garn (30124)
68. Garons (30125)
69. Garrigues-Sainte-Eulalie (30126)
70. Gaujac (30127)
71. Générac (30128)
72. Goudargues (30131)
73. Le Grau-du-Roi (30133)
74. Issirac (30134)
75. Jonquières-Saint-Vincent (30135)
76. Junas (30136)
77. Langlade (30138)
78. Laudun-l'Ardoise (30141)
79. Laval-Saint-Roman (30143)
80. Lecques (30144)
81. Lédenon (30145)
82. Lirac (30149)
83. Lussan (30151)
84. Manduel (30155)
85. Marguerittes (30156)
86. Mauressargues (30163)
87. Meynes (30166)
88. Milhaud, Gard (30169)
89. Montagnac (30354)
90. Montaren-et-Saint-Médiers (30174)
91. Montclus (30175)
92. Montfaucon (30178)
93. Montfrin (30179)
94. Montignargues (30180)
95. Montmirat (30181)
96. Montpezat (30182)
97. Moulézan (30183)
98. Moussac (30184)
99. Mus (30185)
100. Nages-et-Solorgues (30186)
101. Nîmes (30189)
102. Orsan (30191)
103. Parignargues (30193)
104. Le Pin (30196)
105. Pont-Saint-Esprit (30202)
106. Pougnadoresse (30205)
107. Poulx (30206)
108. Pouzilhac (30207)
109. Pujaut (30209)
110. Redessan (30211)
111. Remoulins (30212)
112. Rochefort-du-Gard (30217)
113. Rodilhan (30356)
114. Roquemaure (30221)
115. La Roque-sur-Cèze (30222)
116. La Rouvière (30224)
117. Sabran (30225)
118. Saint-Alexandre (30226)
119. Saint-André-de-Roquepertuis (30230)
120. Saint-André-d'Olérargues (30232)
121. Saint-Bauzély (30233)
122. Saint-Bonnet-du-Gard (30235)
123. Saint-Chaptes (30241)
124. Saint-Christol-de-Rodières (30242)
125. Saint-Clément (30244)
126. Saint-Côme-et-Maruéjols (30245)
127. Saint-Dézéry (30248)
128. Saint-Dionisy (30249)
129. Sainte-Anastasie (30228)
130. Saint-Étienne-des-Sorts (30251)
131. Saint-Geniès-de-Comolas (30254)
132. Saint-Geniès-de-Malgoirès (30255)
133. Saint-Gervais (30256)
134. Saint-Gervasy (30257)
135. Saint-Gilles (30258)
136. Saint-Hilaire-d'Ozilhan (30260)
137. Saint-Hippolyte-de-Montaigu (30262)
138. Saint-Julien-de-Peyrolas (30273)
139. Saint-Laurent-d'Aigouze (30276)
140. Saint-Laurent-de-Carnols (30277)
141. Saint-Laurent-des-Arbres (30278)
142. Saint-Laurent-la-Vernède (30279)
143. Saint-Mamert-du-Gard (30281)
144. Saint-Marcel-de-Careiret (30282)
145. Saint-Maximin (30286)
146. Saint-Michel-d'Euzet (30287)
147. Saint-Nazaire (30288)
148. Saint-Paulet-de-Caisson (30290)
149. Saint-Paul-les-Fonts (30355)
150. Saint-Pons-la-Calm (30292)
151. Saint-Quentin-la-Poterie (30295)
152. Saint-Siffret (30299)
153. Saint-Victor-des-Oules (30301)
154. Saint-Victor-la-Coste (30302)
155. Salazac (30304)
156. Salinelles (30306)
157. Sanilhac-Sagriès (30308)
158. Sauveterre (30312)
159. Sauzet (30313)
160. Saze (30315)
161. Sernhac (30317)
162. Serviers-et-Labaume (30319)
163. Sommières (30321)
164. Souvignargues (30324)
165. Tavel (30326)
166. Théziers (30328)
167. Tresques (30331)
168. Uchaud (30333)
169. Uzès (30334)
170. Vallabrègues (30336)
171. Vallabrix (30337)
172. Vallérargues (30338)
173. Valliguières (30340)
174. Vauvert (30341)
175. Vénéjan (30342)
176. Verfeuil (30343)
177. Vergèze (30344)
178. Vers-Pont-du-Gard (30346)
179. Vestric-et-Candiac (30347)
180. Villeneuve-lès-Avignon (30351)
181. Villevieille (30352)

== History ==
The arrondissement of Nîmes was created in 1800. At the January 2017 reorganisation of the arrondissements of Gard, it gained one commune from the arrondissement of Le Vigan and two communes from the arrondissement of Alès.

As a result of the reorganisation of the cantons of France which came into effect in 2015, the borders of the cantons are no longer related to the borders of the arrondissements. The cantons of the arrondissement of Nîmes were, as of January 2015:

1. Aigues-Mortes
2. Aramon
3. Bagnols-sur-Cèze
4. Beaucaire
5. Lussan
6. Marguerittes
7. Nîmes-1
8. Nîmes-2
9. Nîmes-3
10. Nîmes-4
11. Nîmes-5
12. Nîmes-6
13. Pont-Saint-Esprit
14. Remoulins
15. Rhôny-Vidourle
16. Roquemaure
17. Saint-Chaptes
18. Saint-Gilles
19. Saint-Mamert-du-Gard
20. Sommières
21. Uzès
22. Vauvert
23. Villeneuve-lès-Avignon
24. La Vistrenque
