= Communes of the Gard department =

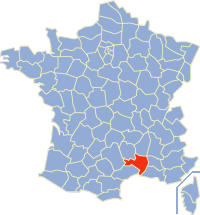

This is a list of the 350 communes of the Gard department of France.

The communes cooperate in the following intercommunalities (as of 2025):

- CA Alès Agglomération
- Communauté d'agglomération du Gard Rhodanien
- Communauté d'agglomération du Grand Avignon (partly)
- Communauté d'agglomération Nîmes Métropole
- Communauté de communes Beaucaire Terre d'Argence
- Communauté de communes Causses Aigoual Cévennes
- Communauté de communes des Cévennes Gangeoises et Suménoises (partly)
- Communauté de communes de Cèze Cévennes (partly)
- Communauté de communes Mont Lozère (partly)
- Communauté de communes du Pays de Sommières
- Communauté de communes Pays d'Uzès
- Communauté de communes du Pays Viganais
- Communauté de communes de Petite-Camargue
- Communauté de communes du Piémont Cévenol
- Communauté de communes du Pont du Gard
- Communauté de communes Rhôny, Vistre, Vidourle
- Communauté de communes Terre de Camargue

INSEE	Postal	Commune
30001	30700	Aigaliers
30002	30350	Aigremont
30003	30220	Aigues-Mortes
30004	30670	Aigues-Vives
30005	30760	Aiguèze
30006	30470	Aimargues
30007	30100	Alès
30008	30500	Allègre-les-Fumades
30009	30770	Alzon
30010	30140	Anduze
30011	30133	Les Angles
30012	30390	Aramon
30013	30210	Argilliers
30014	30700	Arpaillargues-et-Aureillac
30015	30120	Arphy
30016	30120	Arre
30017	30770	Arrigas
30018	30250	Aspères
30019	30250	Aubais
30020	30620	Aubord
30021	30190	Aubussargues
30022	30450	Aujac
30023	30250	Aujargues
30024	30120	Aulas
30025	30770	Aumessas
30026	30120	Avèze
30027	30140	Bagard
30028	30200	Bagnols-sur-Cèze
30029	30430	Barjac
30030	30700	Baron
30031	30330	La Bastide-d'Engras
30032	30300	Beaucaire
30033	30640	Beauvoisin
30034	30127	Bellegarde
30035	30580	Belvézet
30036	30620	Bernis
30037	30160	Bessèges
30038	30120	Bez-et-Esparon
30039	30320	Bezouce
30040	30770	Blandas
30041	30700	Blauzac
30042	30140	Boisset-et-Gaujac
30043	30114	Boissières
30044	30450	Bonnevaux
30045	30160	Bordezac
30046	30190	Boucoiran-et-Nozières
30047	30230	Bouillargues
30048	30580	Bouquet
30049	30190	Bourdic
30050	30260	Bragassargues
30051	30110	Branoux-les-Taillades
30052	30120	Bréau-Mars
30053	30190	Brignon
30055	30580	Brouzet-lès-Alès
30054	30260	Brouzet-lès-Quissac
30056	30580	La Bruguière
30057	30210	Cabrières
30058	30170	La Cadière-et-Cambo
30059	30740	Le Cailar
30060	30132	Caissargues
30061	30190	La Calmette
30062	30420	Calvisson
30064	30770	Campestre-et-Luc
30065	30350	Canaules-et-Argentières
30066	30260	Cannes-et-Clairan
30067	30700	La Capelle-et-Masmolène
30068	30350	Cardet
30069	30260	Carnas
30070	30130	Carsan
30071	30350	Cassagnoles
30072	30190	Castelnau-Valence
30073	30210	Castillon-du-Gard
30074	30750	Causse-Bégon
30075	30820	Caveirac
30076	30330	Cavillargues
30077	30480	Cendras
30079	30450	Chambon
30080	30530	Chamborigaud
30081	30200	Chusclan
30082	30870	Clarensac
30083	30920	Codognan
30084	30200	Codolet
30085	30210	Collias
30086	30190	Collorgues
30087	30460	Colognac
30088	30250	Combas
30089	30300	Comps
30090	30450	Concoules
30091	30111	Congénies
30092	30330	Connaux
30093	30170	Conqueyrac
30095	30260	Corconne
30096	30630	Cornillon
30097	30500	Courry
30098	30260	Crespian
30099	30170	Cros
30100	30360	Cruviers-Lascours
30101	30360	Deaux
30102	30190	Dions
30103	30390	Domazan
30104	30350	Domessargues
30105	30750	Dourbies
30106	30170	Durfort-et-Saint-Martin-de-Sossenac
30107	30390	Estézargues
30108	30124	L'Estréchure
30109	30360	Euzet
30110	30700	Flaux
30111	30700	Foissac
30112	30730	Fons
30113	30580	Fons-sur-Lussan
30114	30250	Fontanès
30115	30580	Fontarèches
30116	30210	Fournès
30117	30300	Fourques
30119	30170	Fressac
30120	30160	Gagnières
30121	30260	Gailhan
30122	30730	Gajan
30123	30660	Gallargues-le-Montueux
30124	30760	Le Garn
30125	30128	Garons
30126	30190	Garrigues-Sainte-Eulalie
30127	30330	Gaujac
30128	30510	Générac
30129	30140	Générargues
30130	30450	Génolhac
30131	30630	Goudargues
30132	30110	La Grand-Combe
30133	30240	Le Grau-du-Roi
30134	30760	Issirac
30135	30300	Jonquières-Saint-Vincent
30136	30250	Junas
30137	30110	Lamelouze
30138	30980	Langlade
30139	30750	Lanuéjols
30140	30460	Lasalle
30141	30290	Laudun-l'Ardoise
30142	30110	Laval-Pradel
30143	30760	Laval-Saint-Roman
30144	30250	Lecques
30145	30210	Lédenon
30146	30350	Lédignan
30147	30350	Lézan
30148	30260	Liouc
30149	30126	Lirac
30150	30610	Logrian-Florian
30151	30580	Lussan
30152	30960	Les Mages
30153	30450	Malons-et-Elze
30154	30120	Mandagout
30155	30129	Manduel
30156	30320	Marguerittes
30158	30360	Martignargues
30159	30960	Le Martinet
30160	30350	Maruéjols-lès-Gardon
30161	30350	Massanes
30162	30140	Massillargues-Attuech
30163	30350	Mauressargues
30164	30430	Méjannes-le-Clap
30165	30340	Méjannes-lès-Alès
30166	30840	Meynes
30167	30410	Meyrannes
30168	30140	Mialet
30169	30540	Milhaud
30170	30120	Molières-Cavaillac
30171	30410	Molières-sur-Cèze
30172	30170	Monoblet
30173	30340	Mons
30354	30350	Montagnac
30174	30700	Montaren-et-Saint-Médiers
30175	30630	Montclus
30176	30120	Montdardier
30177	30360	Monteils
30178	30150	Montfaucon
30179	30490	Montfrin

INSEE	Postal	Commune
30180	30190	Montignargues
30181	30260	Montmirat
30182	30730	Montpezat
30183	30350	Moulézan
30184	30190	Moussac
30185	30121	Mus
30186	30114	Nages-et-Solorgues
30187	30580	Navacelles
30188	30360	Ners
30189	30000	Nîmes
30191	30200	Orsan
30192	30260	Orthoux-Sérignac-Quilhan
30193	30730	Parignargues
30194	30160	Peyremale
30195	30124	Peyrolles
30196	30330	Le Pin
30197	30340	Les Plans
30198	30122	Les Plantiers
30199	30120	Pommiers
30200	30170	Pompignan
30201	30450	Ponteils-et-Brésis
30202	30130	Pont-Saint-Esprit
30203	30530	Portes
30204	30500	Potelières
30205	30330	Pougnadoresse
30206	30320	Poulx
30207	30210	Pouzilhac
30208	30610	Puechredon
30209	30131	Pujaut
30210	30260	Quissac
30211	30129	Redessan
30212	30210	Remoulins
30213	30750	Revens
30214	30720	Ribaute-les-Tavernes
30215	30430	Rivières
30216	30160	Robiac-Rochessadoule
30217	30650	Rochefort-du-Gard
30218	30430	Rochegude
30356	30230	Rodilhan
30219	30120	Rogues
30220	30440	Roquedur
30221	30150	Roquemaure
30222	30200	La Roque-sur-Cèze
30223	30340	Rousson
30224	30190	La Rouvière
30225	30200	Sabran
30226	30130	Saint-Alexandre
30227	30500	Saint-Ambroix
30229	30570	Saint-André-de-Majencoules
30230	30630	Saint-André-de-Roquepertuis
30231	30940	Saint-André-de-Valborgne
30232	30330	Saint-André-d'Olérargues
30233	30730	Saint-Bauzély
30234	30350	Saint-Bénézet
30236	30460	Saint-Bonnet-de-Salendrinque
30235	30210	Saint-Bonnet-du-Gard
30237	30500	Saint-Brès
30238	30440	Saint-Bresson
30240	30360	Saint-Césaire-de-Gauzignan
30241	30190	Saint-Chaptes
30242	30760	Saint-Christol-de-Rodières
30243	30380	Saint-Christol-lès-Alès
30244	30260	Saint-Clément
30245	30870	Saint-Côme-et-Maruéjols
30247	30500	Saint-Denis
30248	30190	Saint-Dézéry
30249	30980	Saint-Dionisy
30228	30190	Sainte-Anastasie
30239	30110	Sainte-Cécile-d'Andorge
30246	30460	Sainte-Croix-de-Caderle
30250	30360	Saint-Étienne-de-l'Olm
30251	30200	Saint-Étienne-des-Sorts
30252	30140	Saint-Félix-de-Pallières
30253	30960	Saint-Florent-sur-Auzonnet
30254	30150	Saint-Geniès-de-Comolas
30255	30190	Saint-Geniès-de-Malgoirès
30256	30200	Saint-Gervais
30257	30320	Saint-Gervasy
30258	30800	Saint-Gilles
30259	30560	Saint-Hilaire-de-Brethmas
30260	30210	Saint-Hilaire-d'Ozilhan
30261	30360	Saint-Hippolyte-de-Caton
30262	30700	Saint-Hippolyte-de-Montaigu
30263	30170	Saint-Hippolyte-du-Fort
30264	30360	Saint-Jean-de-Ceyrargues
30265	30610	Saint-Jean-de-Crieulon
30266	30430	Saint-Jean-de-Maruéjols-et-Avéjan
30267	30350	Saint-Jean-de-Serres
30268	30960	Saint-Jean-de-Valériscle
30269	30270	Saint-Jean-du-Gard
30270	30140	Saint-Jean-du-Pin
30271	30500	Saint-Julien-de-Cassagnas
30272	30440	Saint-Julien-de-la-Nef
30273	30760	Saint-Julien-de-Peyrolas
30274	30340	Saint-Julien-les-Rosiers
30275	30580	Saint-Just-et-Vacquières
30276	30220	Saint-Laurent-d'Aigouze
30277	30200	Saint-Laurent-de-Carnols
30278	30126	Saint-Laurent-des-Arbres
30279	30330	Saint-Laurent-la-Vernède
30280	30440	Saint-Laurent-le-Minier
30281	30730	Saint-Mamert-du-Gard
30282	30330	Saint-Marcel-de-Careiret
30283	30440	Saint-Martial
30284	30520	Saint-Martin-de-Valgalgues
30285	30360	Saint-Maurice-de-Cazevieille
30286	30700	Saint-Maximin
30287	30200	Saint-Michel-d'Euzet
30288	30200	Saint-Nazaire
30289	30610	Saint-Nazaire-des-Gardies
30290	30130	Saint-Paulet-de-Caisson
30291	30480	Saint-Paul-la-Coste
30355	30330	Saint-Paul-les-Fonts
30292	30330	Saint-Pons-la-Calm
30293	30430	Saint-Privat-de-Champclos
30294	30340	Saint-Privat-des-Vieux
30295	30700	Saint-Quentin-la-Poterie
30296	30440	Saint-Roman-de-Codières
30297	30750	Saint-Sauveur-Camprieu
30298	30140	Saint-Sébastien-d'Aigrefeuille
30299	30700	Saint-Siffret
30300	30260	Saint-Théodorit
30303	30500	Saint-Victor-de-Malcap
30301	30700	Saint-Victor-des-Oules
30302	30290	Saint-Victor-la-Coste
30304	30760	Salazac
30305	30340	Salindres
30306	30250	Salinelles
30307	30110	Les Salles-du-Gardon
30308	30700	Sanilhac-Sagriès
30309	30260	Sardan
30310	30125	Saumane
30311	30610	Sauve
30312	30150	Sauveterre
30313	30190	Sauzet
30314	30350	Savignargues
30315	30650	Saze
30316	30450	Sénéchas
30317	30210	Sernhac
30318	30340	Servas
30319	30700	Serviers-et-Labaume
30320	30580	Seynes
30321	30250	Sommières
30322	30460	Soudorgues
30323	30110	Soustelle
30324	30250	Souvignargues
30325	30440	Sumène
30326	30126	Tavel
30327	30430	Tharaux
30328	30390	Théziers
30329	30140	Thoiras-Corbès
30330	30140	Tornac
30331	30330	Tresques
30332	30750	Trèves
30333	30620	Uchaud
30334	30700	Uzès
30335	30460	Vabres
30339	30570	Val-d'Aigoual
30336	30300	Vallabrègues
30337	30700	Vallabrix
30338	30580	Vallérargues
30340	30210	Valliguières
30341	30600	Vauvert
30342	30200	Vénéjan
30343	30630	Verfeuil
30344	30310	Vergèze
30345	30530	La Vernarède
30346	30210	Vers-Pont-du-Gard
30347	30600	Vestric-et-Candiac
30348	30360	Vézénobres
30349	30260	Vic-le-Fesq
30350	30120	Le Vigan
30351	30400	Villeneuve-lès-Avignon
30352	30250	Villevieille
30353	30770	Vissec
