= Sennia gens =

Ancient Roman family

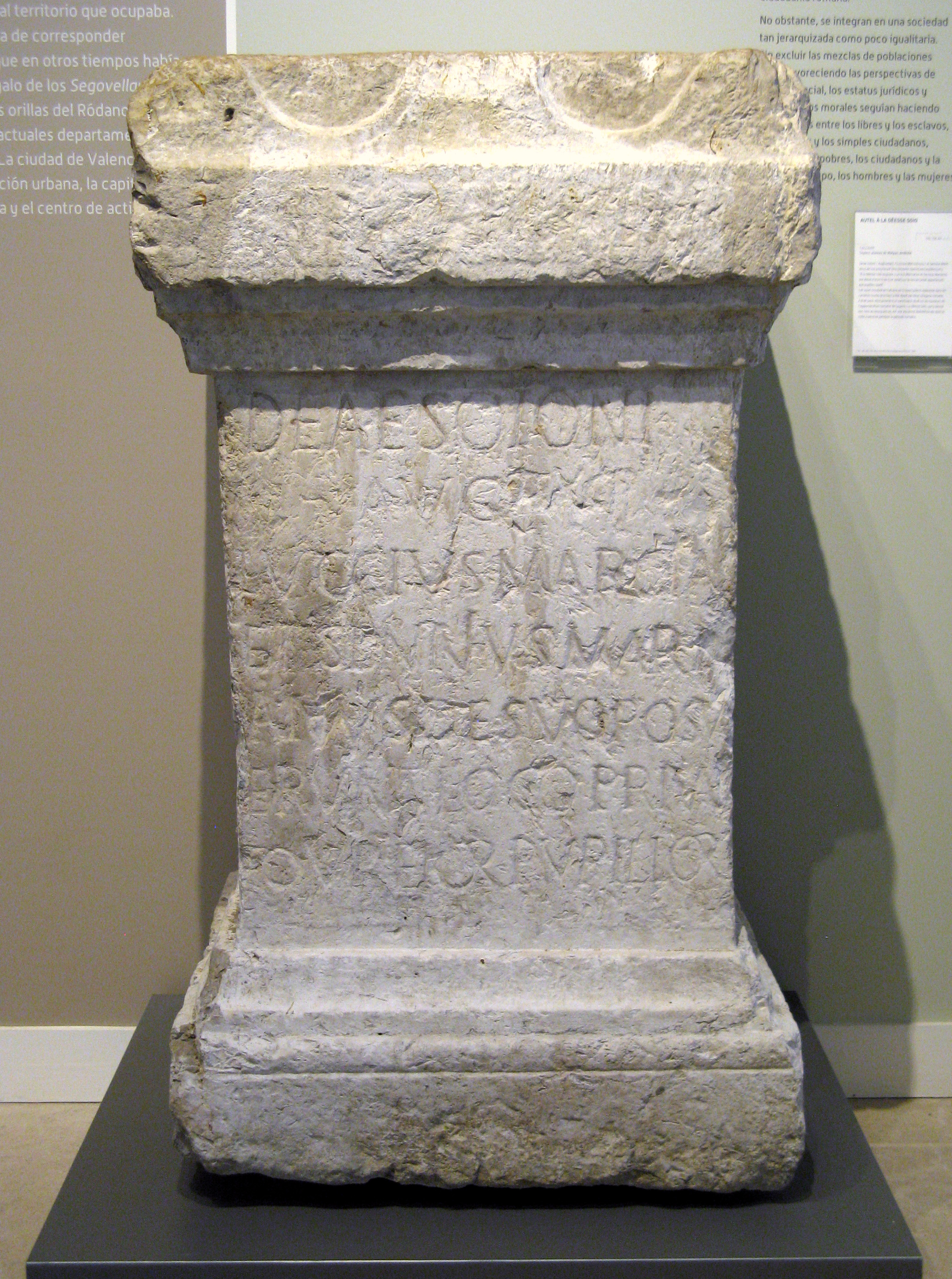
Altar dedicated to the goddess Soio by Sennius Marianus and Luccius Marcianus, from Soyons, Ardèche (ancient Valentia)

The gens Sennia was an obscure plebeian family at ancient Rome. Few members of this gens are mentioned in history, but others are known from inscriptions.

== Origin ==
A large majority of the Sennii are known from inscriptions from various parts of Gaul, suggesting that the family was of Gallic origin.

== Praenomina ==
The main praenomina of the Sennii were Lucius, Gaius, and Marcus, the three most common names throughout all periods of Roman history. Less frequently the Sennii employed a variety of other common praenomina, including Titus, Quintus, Sextus, and Decimus.

== Members ==
This list includes abbreviated praenomina. For an explanation of this practice, see filiation.

- Sennius Sabinus, proconsul of an unknown province, to whom the emperor Hadrian gave instructions that slaves accused of a crime should not be tortured in order to obtain a confession, unless already suspected and other evidence obtained, with only a confession wanting. The jurist Ulpian mentions Hadrian's letter to Sabinus in his De Officio Proconsulis.
- Sennius, a mid-second century potter whose workshop was in Manduessedum, formerly part of Roman Britain. He is known for his mortaria, found throughout Britain and Gaul.
- Titus Sennius Sollemnis, the son of Sollemninus, was one of the municipal duumvirs at Aragenua in Gallia Lugdunensis, named in a dedicatory inscription dating to AD 238.

=== Undated Sennii ===
- Sennia, named in an inscription from Cataractonium in Britain.
- Sennia, buried at Segessera in Gallia Lugdunensis, with a monument from her father, Sennius Bellicus.
- Marcus Sennius Antius, buried at Nemausus in Gallia Narbonensis.
- Sennia T. f. Atticilla, dedicated a second-century monument at Rome to her husband, Lucius Statius Epagathus, together with their children, Statia Statorina and Statius Statorinus.
- Sennius Bellicus, built a monument at Segessera for his daughter, Sennia.
- Titus Sennius Felix, a native of Puteoli in Campania, was a teacher mentioned in an inscription from Juliobona in Gallia Lugdunensis, along with his student, "Amor".
- Sennius L. f. Eularus, a soldier in the sixth cohort of the century of Magnus, buried at Rome in a tomb built by his heir, Julius Candidus.
- Marcus Sennius Fronto, fulfilled a vow made to Diana, according to an inscription found at Badenweiler, formerly part of Germania Superior.
- Lucius Sennius Germanus, dedicated a monument at Vienna in Gallia Narbonensis to his son, Lucius Aterius Augustalis.
- Lucius Sennius Hermogenes, buried at the present site of Bouillargues, formerly part of Gallia Narbonensis, aged twenty-two years and seven months, with a monument from his nurse, Titia Epictesis.
- Sennia Hygia, the wife of Titus Vettius Carugenus, who dedicated a monument at Nemausus to her, and to their son, Vettius Severus.
- Sennia Hygia, buried at Nemausus.
- Sennia Iulla, the wife of Marcus Sennius Metilius Treverus, a merchant in Cisalpine and Transalpine Gaul, buried with her husband at Lugdunum in Gallia Lugdunensis, in a tomb built by their children.
- Gaius Sennius Iullus, named in an inscription from Nemausus.
- Sennius Macer, named in an inscription from Limonum in Gallia Aquitania.
- Sennius Major, buried at Treveri in Gallia Belgica, with a monument from his wife.
- Sennius Marcianus, named in an inscription found at Cran-Gevrier, formerly part of Gallia Narbonensis.
- Sennius Marianus, together with Luccius Marcianus, made an offering to Soio, a river goddess worshipped at Valentia in Gallia Narbonensis.
- Sennius Martius, an augur named in an inscription dedicated to Mercury at the present site of Creys-Mépieu, formerly part of Gallia Narbonensis.
- Marcus Sennius Metilius Treverus, a merchant engaged in trade in Cisalpine and Transalpine Gaul, buried at Lugdunum along with his wife, Sennia Iulla, in a tomb built by their children.
- Quintus Sennius Onesiphorus, buried at Nemausus, with a monument from his mother, Sennia Porpuris.
- Sennia Porpuris, built a tomb at Nemausus for her son, Quintus Sennius Onesiphorus.
- Lucius Sennius Primus, buried at Ugernum in Gallia Narbonensis, together with his wife, Messia Dubitata, with a monument from their sons, Lucius Sennius Saturninus, Lucius Sennius Secundus, and Lucius Sennius Servatus.
- Gaius Sennius Sabinus, made an offering to Mars at Genava in Gallia Narbonensis.
- Lucius Sennius L. f. Saturninus, the son of Lucius Sennius Primus and Messia Dubitata, for whom he and his brothers built a tomb at Ugernum.
- Gaius Sennius C. f. Sabinus, prefect of the engineers at a Roman camp near the present site of Marigny-Saint-Marcel, formerly part of Gallia Narbonensis.
- Sennia Sex. f. Secunda, buried at Ucetia in Gallia Narbonensis.
- Lucius Sennius L. f. Secundus, the son of Lucius Sennius Primus and Messia Dubitata, for whom he and his brothers built a tomb at Ugernum.
- Lucius Sennius L. f. Servatus, the son of Lucius Sennius Primus and Messia Dubitata, for whom he and his brothers built a tomb at Ugernum.
- Marcus Sennius M. f. Verus, a native of Colonia Claudia Ara Agrippinensium in Germania Inferior, buried at Rome, aged twenty, with a tomb built by Messor.
- Decimus Sennius Vitalis, one of the municipal duumvirs at Glevum in Britain, in an uncertain year.

== See also ==
- List of Roman gentes

== Bibliography ==
- Digesta, or Pandectae (The Digest).
- Theodor Mommsen et alii, Corpus Inscriptionum Latinarum (The Body of Latin Inscriptions, abbreviated CIL), Berlin-Brandenburgische Akademie der Wissenschaften (1853–present).
- Bullettino della Commissione Archeologica Comunale in Roma (Bulletin of the Municipal Archaeological Commission of Rome, abbreviated BCAR), (1872–present).
- Bulletin Archéologique du Comité des Travaux Historiques et Scientifiques (Archaeological Bulletin of the Committee on Historic and Scientific Works, abbreviated BCTH), Imprimerie Nationale, Paris (1885–1973).
- René Cagnat et alii, L'Année épigraphique (The Year in Epigraphy, abbreviated AE), Presses Universitaires de France (1888–present).
- Paul von Rohden, Elimar Klebs, & Hermann Dessau, Prosopographia Imperii Romani (The Prosopography of the Roman Empire, abbreviated PIR), Berlin (1898).
- La Carte Archéologique de la Gaule (Archaeological Map of Gaul, abbreviated CAG), Académie des Inscriptions et Belles-Lettres (1931–present).
- The Princeton Encyclopedia of Classical Sites, Richard Stilwell, William L. MacDonald, Marian Holland McAlister, eds., Princeton University Press (1976).
- The Roman Inscriptions of Britain (abbreviated RIB), Oxford, (1990–present).
- Alan Rushworth, Housesteads Roman Fort – The Grandest Station: Excavation and Survey at Housesteads, 1954–95, English Heritage Publishing (2014).
