= Foissac =

Foissac is the name of 2 communes in France:

- Foissac, in the Aveyron department
- Foissac, in the Gard department
