= La Capelle-et-Masmolène =

Commune in Occitanie, France

- Commune
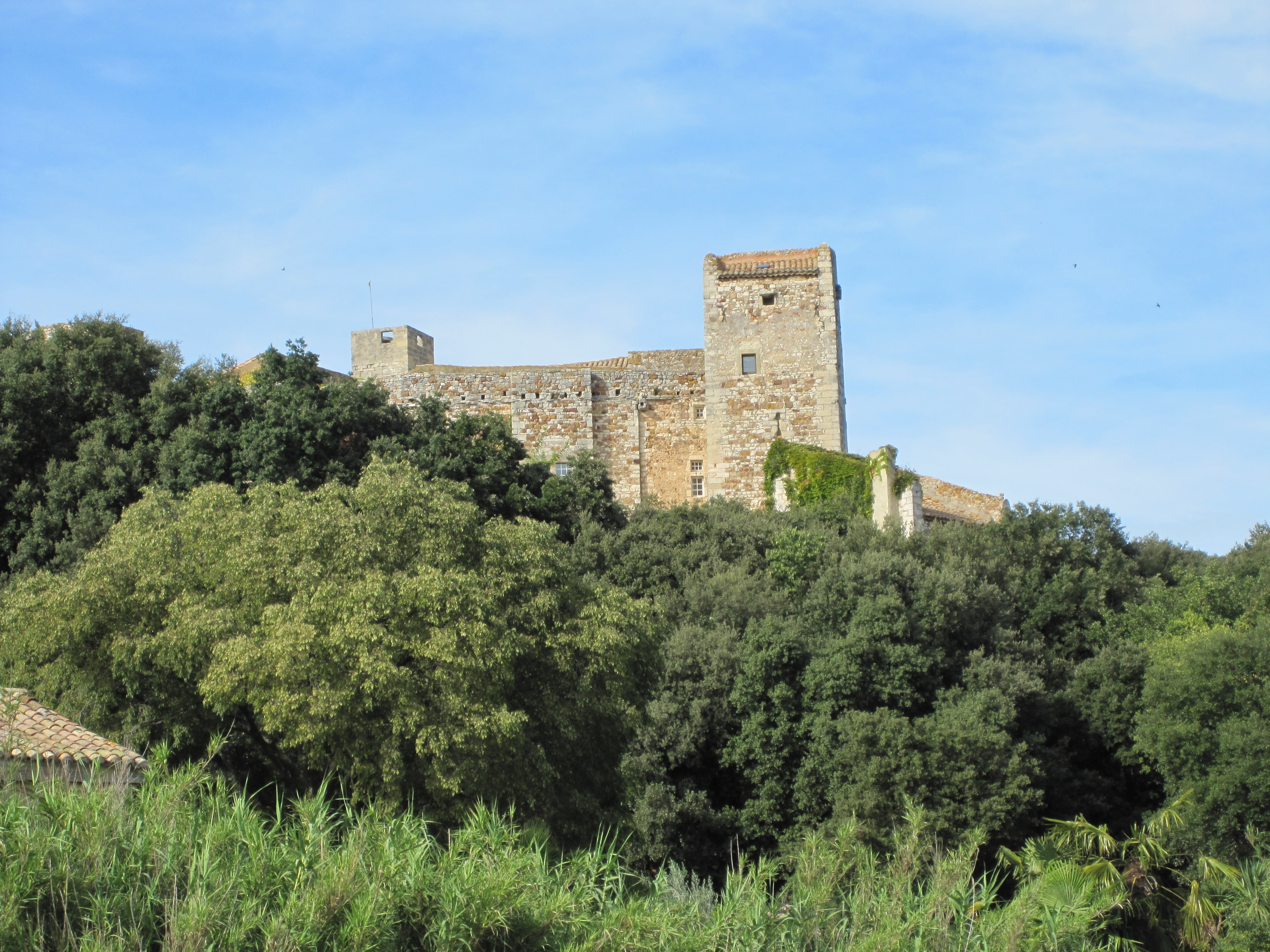
- A general view of La Capelle-et-Masmolène

- Coat of arms
- Location of La Capelle-et-Masmolène
- Location within France Location within Occitanie
- Coordinates: 44°03′09″N 4°32′00″E
- Country: France
- Region: Occitania
- Department: Gard
- Arrondissement: Nîmes
- Canton: Uzès

Government
  - Mayor (2020–2026): Xavier Gayte
- Area^{1}: 24.45 km^{2} (9.44 sq mi)
- Elevation: 246 m (807 ft)
- Highest elevation: 267 m (876 ft)
- Lowest elevation: 148 m (486 ft)
- Population (2023): 441
  - Density: 18.0/km^{2} (46.7/sq mi)
- Time zone: UTC+01:00 (CET)
  - Summer (DST): UTC+02:00 (CEST)
- INSEE/Postal code: 30067 /30700
- ^{1} French Land Register data, which excludes lakes, ponds, glaciers > 1 km^{2} (0.386 sq mi or 247 acres) and river estuaries.

La Capelle-et-Masmolène (French pronunciation: [la kapɛl e masmɔlɛn]; Occitan: La Capèla e Masmolena) is a commune in the Gard department in southern France.

== Population ==
Historical population
Year	Pop.	±% p.a.
1968	276	—
1975	233	−2.39%
1982	298	+3.58%
1990	323	+1.01%
1999	373	+1.61%
2007	383	+0.33%
2012	417	+1.72%
2017	439	+1.03%
2023	441	+0.08%
Source: INSEE

== See also ==
- Communes of the Gard department
