= Baron, Gard =

Commune in Occitanie, France

Baron
- Commune
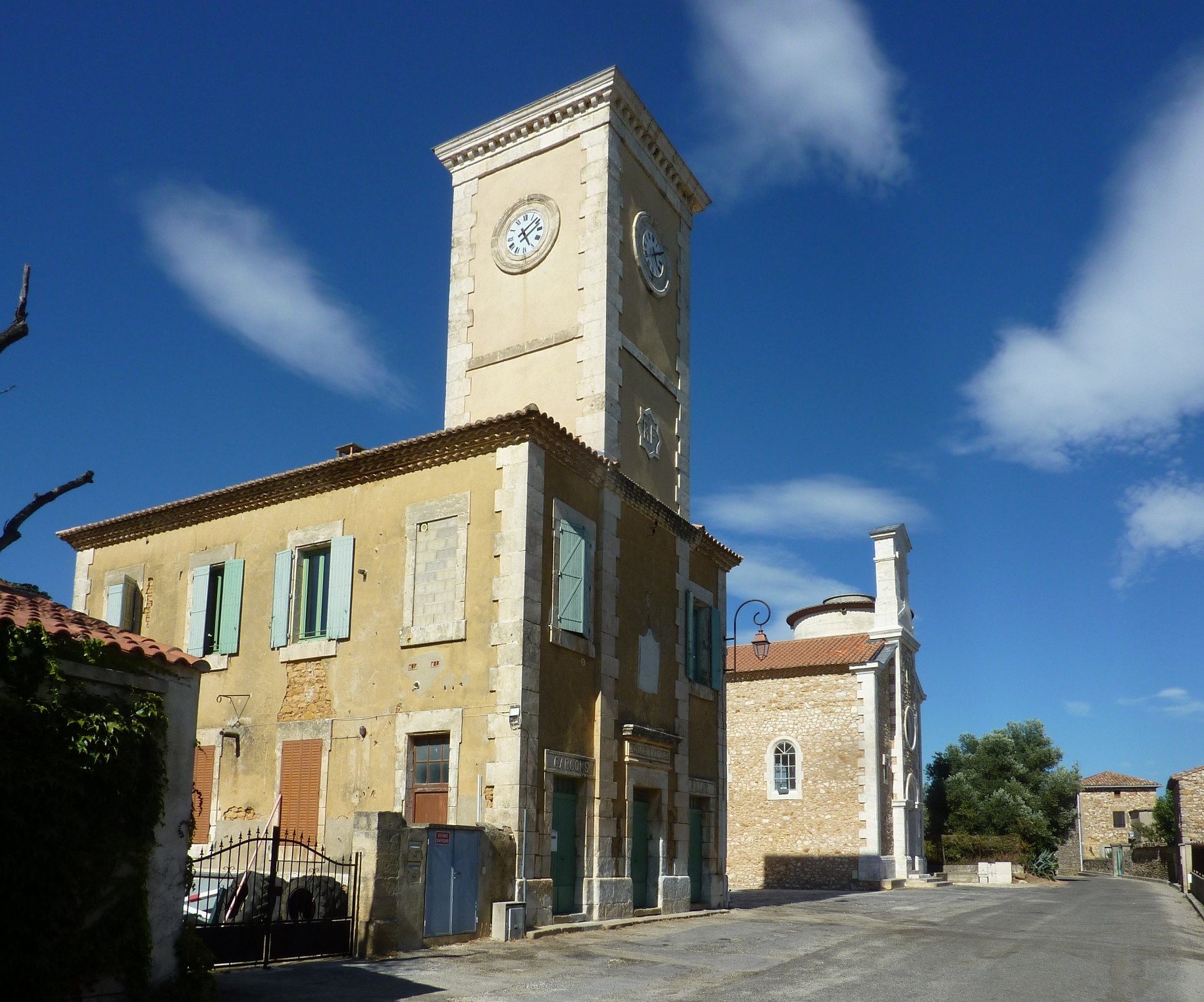

- Coat of arms
- Location of Baron
- Location within France Location within Occitanie
- Coordinates: 44°03′00″N 4°16′54″E
- Country: France
- Region: Occitania
- Department: Gard
- Arrondissement: Nîmes
- Canton: Uzès

Government
  - Mayor (2020–2026): Christian Petit
- Area^{1}: 10.06 km^{2} (3.88 sq mi)
- Elevation: 200 m (660 ft)
- Highest elevation: 364 m (1,194 ft)
- Lowest elevation: 128 m (420 ft)
- Population (2023): 337
  - Density: 33.5/km^{2} (86.8/sq mi)
- Time zone: UTC+01:00 (CET)
  - Summer (DST): UTC+02:00 (CEST)
- INSEE/Postal code: 30030 /30700
- ^{1} French Land Register data, which excludes lakes, ponds, glaciers > 1 km^{2} (0.386 sq mi or 247 acres) and river estuaries.

Baron (French pronunciation: [baʁɔ̃]) is a commune in the Gard department in southern France.

== Population ==
Historical population
| Year | Pop. | ±% p.a. |
|---|---|---|
| 1968 | 165 | — |
| 1975 | 154 | −0.98% |
| 1982 | 201 | +3.88% |
| 1990 | 199 | −0.12% |
| 1999 | 229 | +1.57% |
| 2007 | 315 | +4.07% |
| 2012 | 338 | +1.42% |
| 2017 | 356 | +1.04% |
| 2023 | 337 | −0.91% |
Source: INSEE

== See also ==
- Communes of the Gard department
