= Flaux =

- Commune
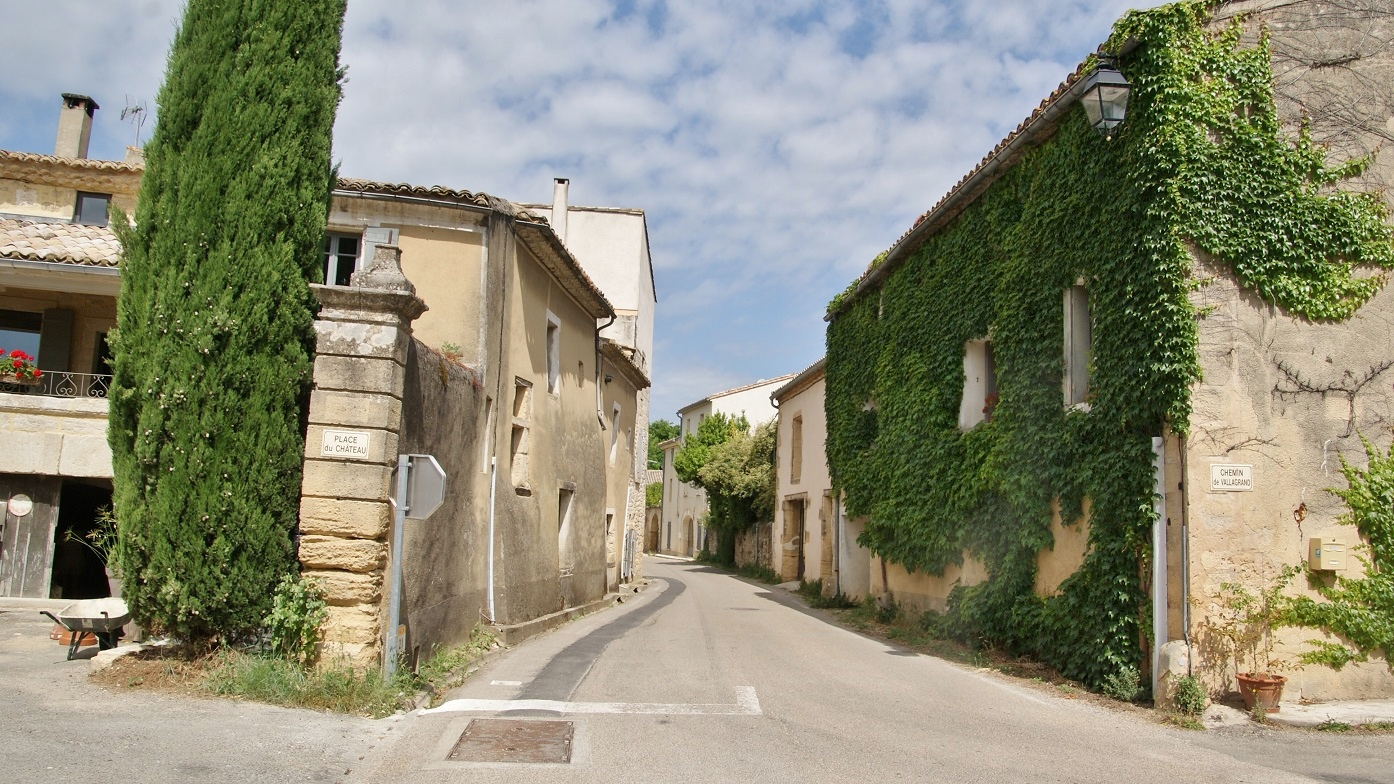

- Coat of arms
- Location of Flaux
- Location within France Location within Occitanie
- Coordinates: 44°01′17″N 4°30′16″E
- Country: France
- Region: Occitania
- Department: Gard
- Arrondissement: Nîmes
- Canton: Uzès
- Intercommunality: Pays d'Uzès

Government
  - Mayor (2020–2026): Denis Juvin
- Area^{1}: 10.68 km^{2} (4.12 sq mi)
- Elevation: 110 m (360 ft)
- Highest elevation: 212 m (696 ft)
- Lowest elevation: 112 m (367 ft)
- Population (2023): 336
  - Density: 31.5/km^{2} (81.5/sq mi)
- Time zone: UTC+01:00 (CET)
  - Summer (DST): UTC+02:00 (CEST)
- INSEE/Postal code: 30110 /30700
- ^{1} French Land Register data, which excludes lakes, ponds, glaciers > 1 km^{2} (0.386 sq mi or 247 acres) and river estuaries.

Flaux (French pronunciation: [flo]; Occitan: Flaus) is a commune in the Gard department in southern France.

The municipality is located at a distance of about 570 km south of Paris, 70 km northeast of Montpellier, and 24 km northeast of Nîmes.

== History ==
Until 2015, the municipality was part of the Languedoc-Roussillon region. Since 1 January 2016, it has belonged to the newly merged region of Occitania.

== Economy ==
In 2022, out of 196 people of working age (15–64), 146 were economically active and 50 were inactive (activity rate 74.5%). Of the 146 active residents, 128 were employed, while 18 were unemployed. Among the inactive population, 5.6% were pupils, students or unpaid trainees, 10.7% were retirees or pre-retirees, and 9.2% were inactive for other reasons.

In 2021, the municipality had 148 taxable households, comprising 335 people in those households, with a median disposable income of €24,120 per consumption unit.

== Population ==
Historical population
Year	Pop.	±% p.a.
1968	113	—
1975	134	+2.46%
1982	167	+3.20%
1990	239	+4.58%
1999	261	+0.98%
2007	314	+2.34%
2012	314	+0.00%
2017	375	+3.61%
2023	336	−1.81%
Source: INSEE

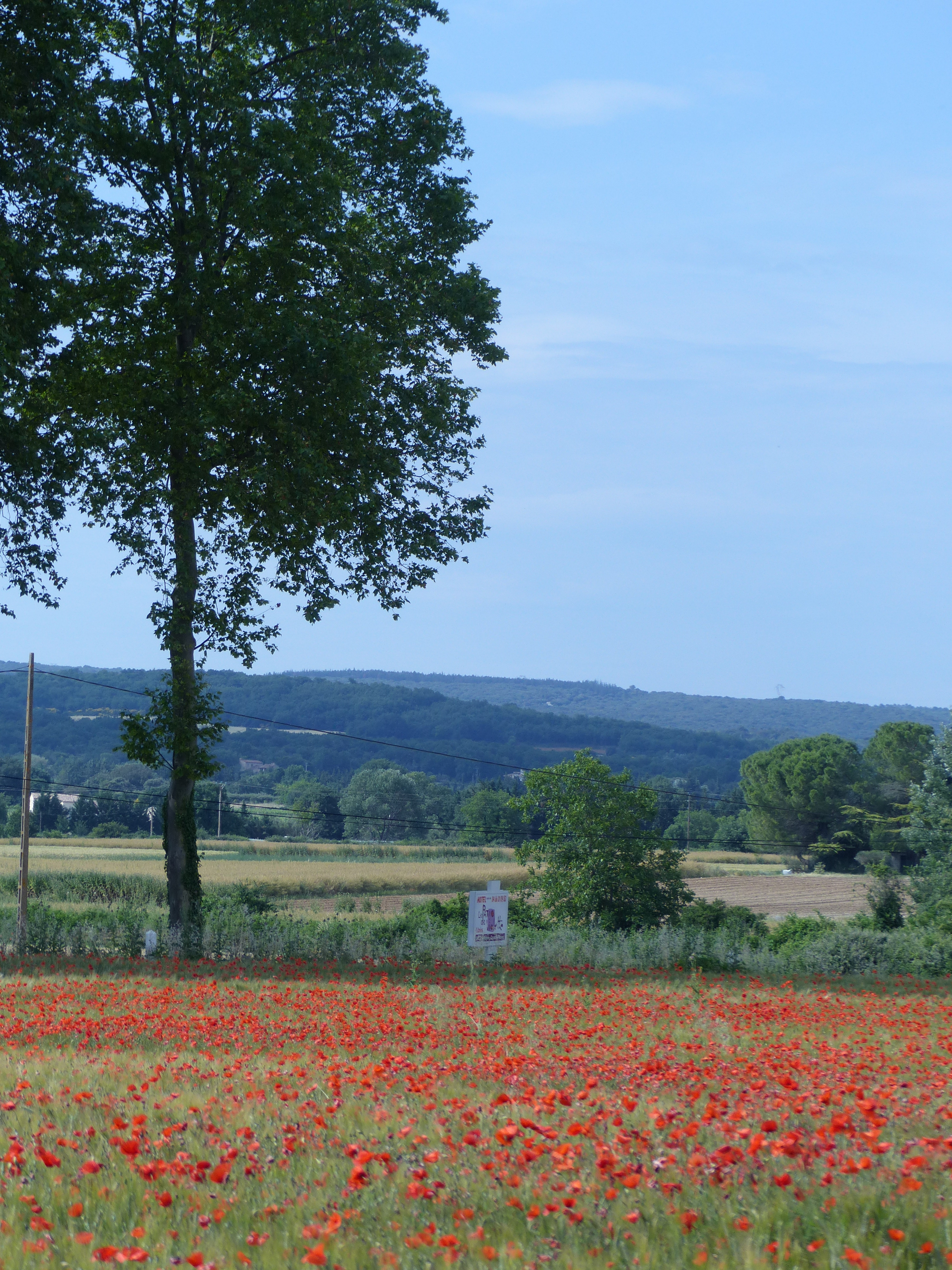
Flaux

== See also ==
- Communes of the Gard department
