= Vallabrix =

- Commune
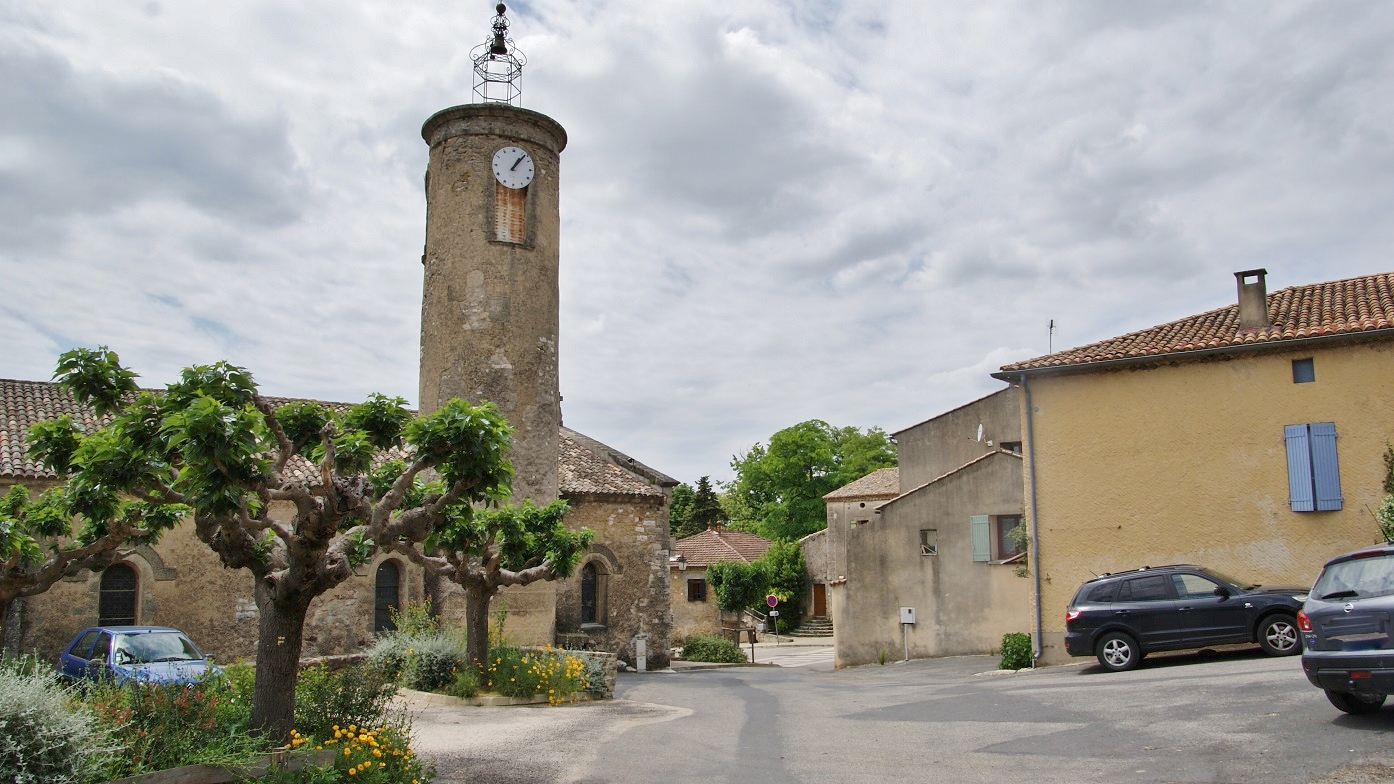

- Coat of arms
- Location of Vallabrix
- Location within France Location within Occitanie
- Coordinates: 44°03′43″N 4°28′46″E
- Country: France
- Region: Occitania
- Department: Gard
- Arrondissement: Nîmes
- Canton: Uzès

Government
  - Mayor (2020–2026): Bernard Rieu
- Area^{1}: 7.94 km^{2} (3.07 sq mi)
- Elevation: 145 m (476 ft)
- Highest elevation: 237 m (778 ft)
- Lowest elevation: 108 m (354 ft)
- Population (2023): 414
  - Density: 52.1/km^{2} (135/sq mi)
- Time zone: UTC+01:00 (CET)
  - Summer (DST): UTC+02:00 (CEST)
- INSEE/Postal code: 30337 /30700
- ^{1} French Land Register data, which excludes lakes, ponds, glaciers > 1 km^{2} (0.386 sq mi or 247 acres) and river estuaries.

Vallabrix (French pronunciation: [valabʁi]; Occitan: Valabriç) is a commune in the Gard department in southern France.

== Population ==
Historical population
Year	Pop.	±% p.a.
1968	205	—
1975	198	−0.50%
1982	216	+1.25%
1990	309	+4.58%
1999	341	+1.10%
2007	363	+0.78%
2012	398	+1.86%
2017	432	+1.65%
2023	414	−0.71%
Source: INSEE

== See also ==
- Communes of the Gard department
