= Saint-Victor-des-Oules =

- Commune
- Coat of arms
- Location of Saint-Victor-des-Oules
- Location within France Location within Occitanie
- Coordinates: 44°02′34″N 4°29′05″E
- Country: France
- Region: Occitania
- Department: Gard
- Arrondissement: Nîmes
- Canton: Uzès

Government
  - Mayor (2020–2026): Marie-Michèle Alvaro
- Area^{1}: 4.77 km^{2} (1.84 sq mi)
- Elevation: 150 m (490 ft)
- Highest elevation: 242 m (794 ft)
- Lowest elevation: 96 m (315 ft)
- Population (2023): 301
  - Density: 63.1/km^{2} (163/sq mi)
- Time zone: UTC+01:00 (CET)
  - Summer (DST): UTC+02:00 (CEST)
- INSEE/Postal code: 30301 /30700
- ^{1} French Land Register data, which excludes lakes, ponds, glaciers > 1 km^{2} (0.386 sq mi or 247 acres) and river estuaries.

Saint-Victor-des-Oules (French pronunciation: [sɛ̃ viktɔʁ de.z‿ul]; Provençal: Sent Victor deis Olas) is a commune in the Gard department in southern France.

== Population ==
Historical population
Year	Pop.	±% p.a.
1968	85	—
1975	105	+3.06%
1982	147	+4.92%
1990	195	+3.60%
1999	219	+1.30%
2007	254	+1.87%
2012	296	+3.11%
2017	306	+0.67%
2023	301	−0.27%
Source: INSEE

== See also ==
- Communes of the Gard department
