= Saint-Hippolyte-de-Montaigu =

- Commune
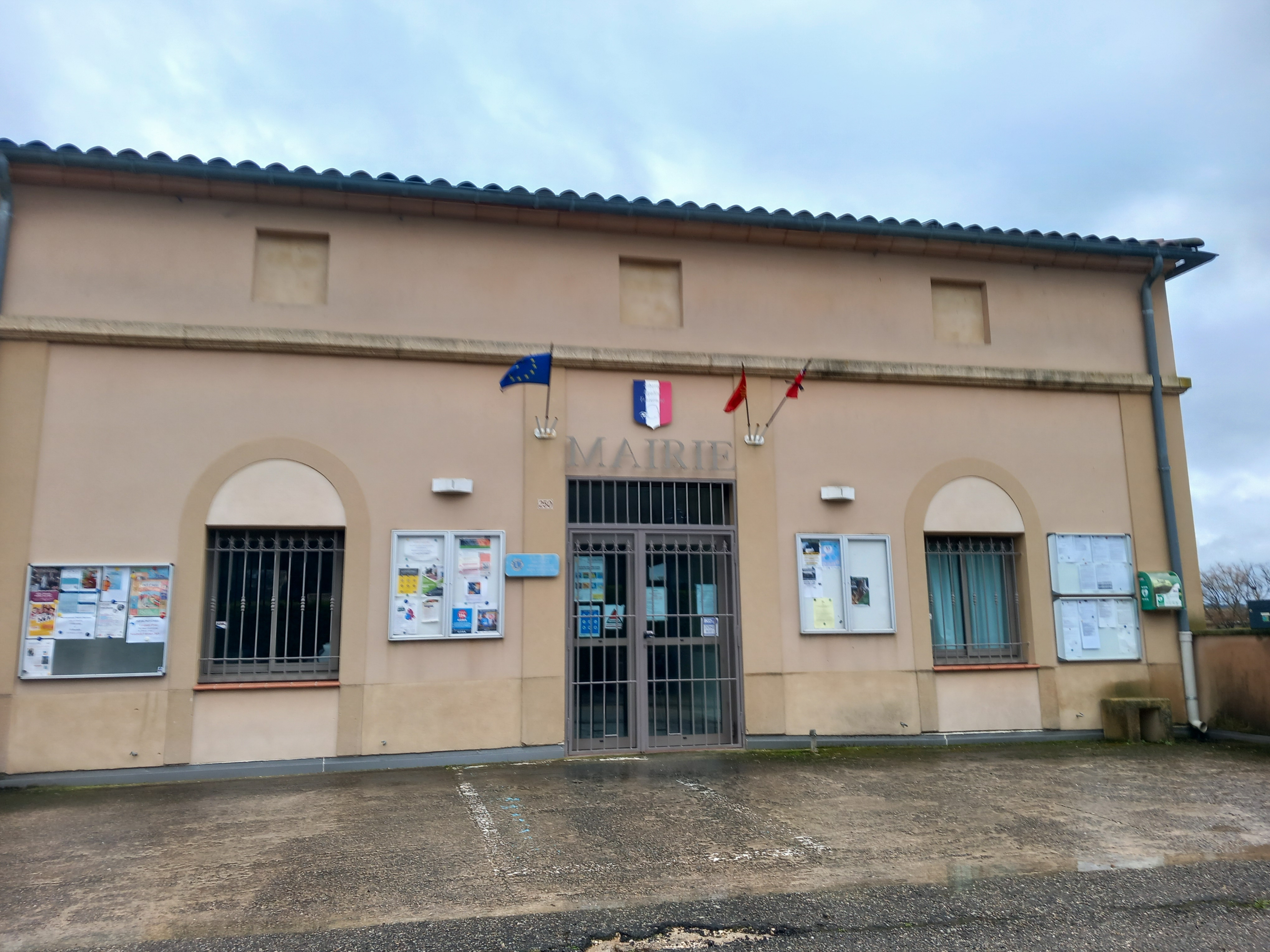
- Saint-Hippolyte-de-Montaigu Town hall

- Coat of arms
- Location of Saint-Hippolyte-de-Montaigu
- Location within France Location within Occitanie
- Coordinates: 44°01′59″N 4°29′36″E
- Country: France
- Region: Occitania
- Department: Gard
- Arrondissement: Nîmes
- Canton: Uzès

Government
  - Mayor (2020–2026): Bernard Barberi
- Area^{1}: 4.05 km^{2} (1.56 sq mi)
- Elevation: 120 m (390 ft)
- Highest elevation: 260 m (850 ft)
- Lowest elevation: 104 m (341 ft)
- Population (2023): 246
  - Density: 60.7/km^{2} (157/sq mi)
- Time zone: UTC+01:00 (CET)
  - Summer (DST): UTC+02:00 (CEST)
- INSEE/Postal code: 30262 /30700
- ^{1} French Land Register data, which excludes lakes, ponds, glaciers > 1 km^{2} (0.386 sq mi or 247 acres) and river estuaries.

Saint-Hippolyte-de-Montaigu (French pronunciation: [sɛ̃t‿ipɔlit də mɔ̃tɛɡy]; Provençal: Sent Ipolit de Montagut) is a commune in the Gard department in southern France.

== Population ==
Historical population
| Year | Pop. | ±% p.a. |
|---|---|---|
| 1968 | 50 | — |
| 1975 | 89 | +8.59% |
| 1982 | 95 | +0.94% |
| 1990 | 99 | +0.52% |
| 1999 | 116 | +1.78% |
| 2007 | 235 | +9.23% |
| 2012 | 260 | +2.04% |
| 2017 | 260 | +0.00% |
| 2023 | 246 | −0.92% |
Source: INSEE

== See also ==
- Communes of the Gard department
