= Montaren-et-Saint-Médiers =

- Commune
- Coat of arms
- Location of Montaren-et-Saint-Médiers
- Location within France Location within Occitanie
- Coordinates: 44°01′50″N 4°22′49″E
- Country: France
- Region: Occitania
- Department: Gard
- Arrondissement: Nîmes
- Canton: Uzès

Government
  - Mayor (2020–2026): Frédéric Levesque
- Area^{1}: 19.42 km^{2} (7.50 sq mi)
- Elevation: 103 m (338 ft)
- Highest elevation: 274 m (899 ft)
- Lowest elevation: 83 m (272 ft)
- Population (2023): 1,397
  - Density: 71.94/km^{2} (186.3/sq mi)
- Time zone: UTC+01:00 (CET)
  - Summer (DST): UTC+02:00 (CEST)
- INSEE/Postal code: 30174 /30700
- ^{1} French Land Register data, which excludes lakes, ponds, glaciers > 1 km^{2} (0.386 sq mi or 247 acres) and river estuaries.

Montaren-et-Saint-Médiers (French pronunciation: [mɔ̃taʁɑ̃ e sɛ̃ medje]; Occitan: Montaren e Sent Medier) is a commune in the Gard department in southern France.

== Population ==
Historical population
Year	Pop.	±% p.a.
1968	518	—
1975	654	+3.39%
1982	805	+3.01%
1990	1,094	+3.91%
1999	1,236	+1.37%
2007	1,351	+1.12%
2012	1,518	+2.36%
2017	1,434	−1.13%
2023	1,397	−0.43%
Source: INSEE

== See also ==
- Communes of the Gard department
