= Moulézan =

- Commune
- Coat of arms
- Location of Moulézan
- Location within France Location within Occitanie
- Coordinates: 43°55′49″N 4°07′37″E
- Country: France
- Region: Occitania
- Department: Gard
- Arrondissement: Nîmes
- Canton: Quissac
- Intercommunality: CA Nîmes Métropole

Government
  - Mayor (2024–2026): Denis Malaval
- Area^{1}: 11.39 km^{2} (4.40 sq mi)
- Elevation: 80 m (260 ft)
- Highest elevation: 284 m (932 ft)
- Lowest elevation: 69 m (226 ft)
- Population (2023): 637
  - Density: 55.9/km^{2} (145/sq mi)
- Time zone: UTC+01:00 (CET)
  - Summer (DST): UTC+02:00 (CEST)
- INSEE/Postal code: 30183 /30350
- ^{1} French Land Register data, which excludes lakes, ponds, glaciers > 1 km^{2} (0.386 sq mi or 247 acres) and river estuaries.

Moulézan (French pronunciation: [mulezɑ̃]; Occitan: Molesan) is a commune in the Gard department in southern France.

== Population ==
Historical population
| Year | Pop. | ±% p.a. |
|---|---|---|
| 1968 | 280 | — |
| 1975 | 284 | +0.20% |
| 1982 | 300 | +0.79% |
| 1990 | 330 | +1.20% |
| 1999 | 396 | +2.05% |
| 2007 | 428 | +0.98% |
| 2012 | 609 | +7.31% |
| 2017 | 648 | +1.25% |
| 2023 | 637 | −0.28% |
Source: INSEE

== See also ==
- Communes of the Gard department
