= Saint-Quentin-la-Poterie =

- Commune
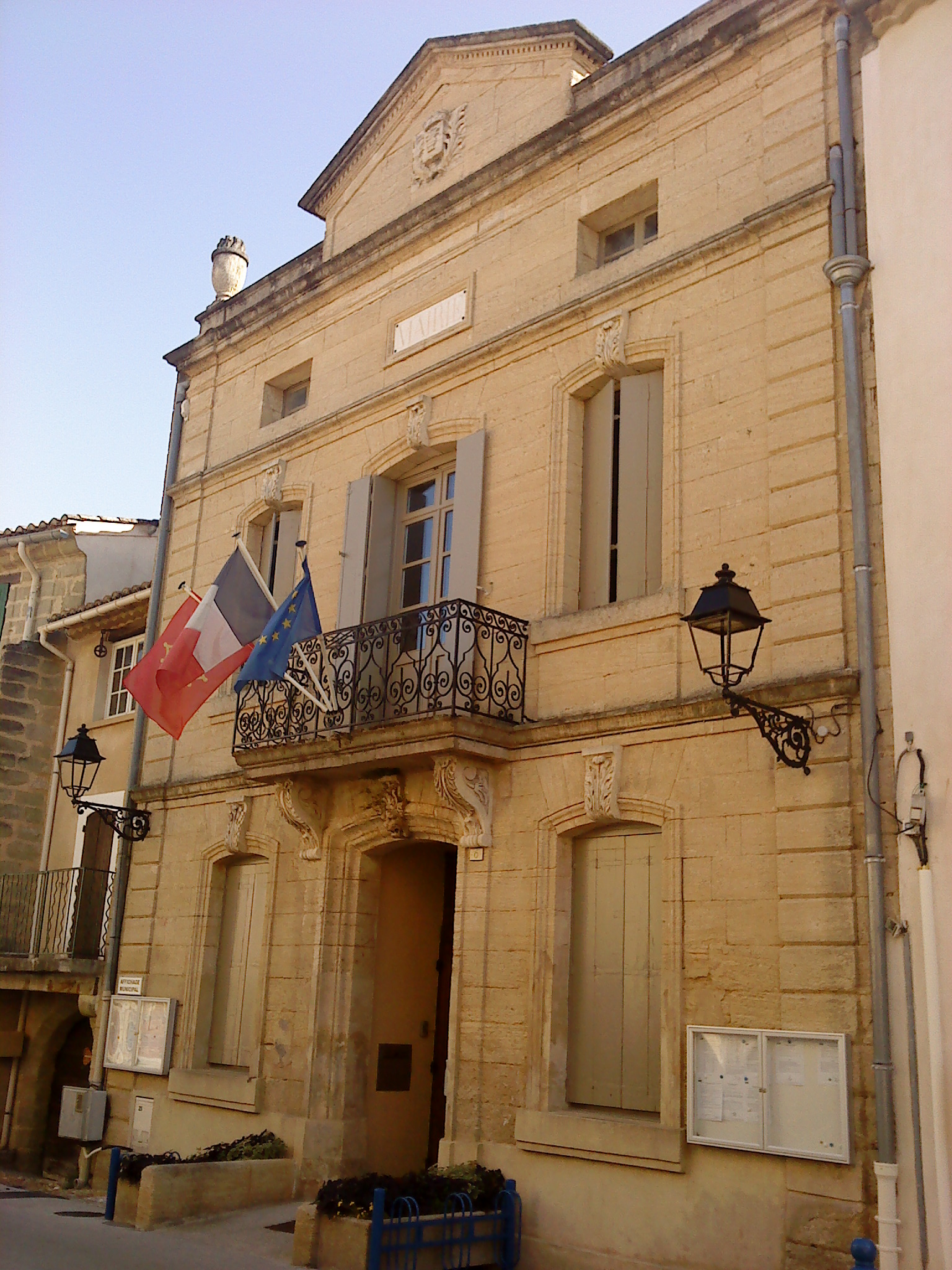
- Town hall

- Coat of arms
- Location of Saint-Quentin-la-Poterie
- Location within France Location within Occitanie
- Coordinates: 44°02′46″N 4°26′31″E
- Country: France
- Region: Occitania
- Department: Gard
- Arrondissement: Nîmes
- Canton: Uzès

Government
  - Mayor (2020–2026): Yvon Bonzi
- Area^{1}: 24.06 km^{2} (9.29 sq mi)
- Elevation: 115 m (377 ft)
- Highest elevation: 272 m (892 ft)
- Lowest elevation: 82 m (269 ft)
- Population (2023): 3,173
  - Density: 131.9/km^{2} (341.6/sq mi)
- Time zone: UTC+01:00 (CET)
  - Summer (DST): UTC+02:00 (CEST)
- INSEE/Postal code: 30295 /30700
- ^{1} French Land Register data, which excludes lakes, ponds, glaciers > 1 km^{2} (0.386 sq mi or 247 acres) and river estuaries.

Saint-Quentin-la-Poterie (French pronunciation: [sɛ̃ kɑ̃tɛ̃ la pɔtʁi]; Occitan: Sent Quentin de la Terralha) is a commune in the Gard department in southern France. The town is the home of the Museum of Mediterranean Pottery and has 25 ceramic workshops. In 2021 it hosted Terralha, the European festival of ceramic arts.

== History ==
The suffix Poterie (English: pottery) was added to the town's name in 1886 following a decree signed by Jules Grévy, then President of the French Republic.

== Population ==
Historical population
Year	Pop.	±% p.a.
1968	1,356	—
1975	1,510	+1.55%
1982	1,753	+2.15%
1990	2,290	+3.40%
1999	2,731	+1.98%
2007	2,892	+0.72%
2012	2,956	+0.44%
2017	3,054	+0.65%
2023	3,173	+0.64%
Source: INSEE

== Personalities ==
Joseph Monier, the inventor of reinforced concrete used in construction, was born in the village in 1823. The town's marketplace has a reinforced concrete covering.

== See also ==
- Communes of the Gard department
