= Blauzac =

Commune in Occitanie, France

- Commune
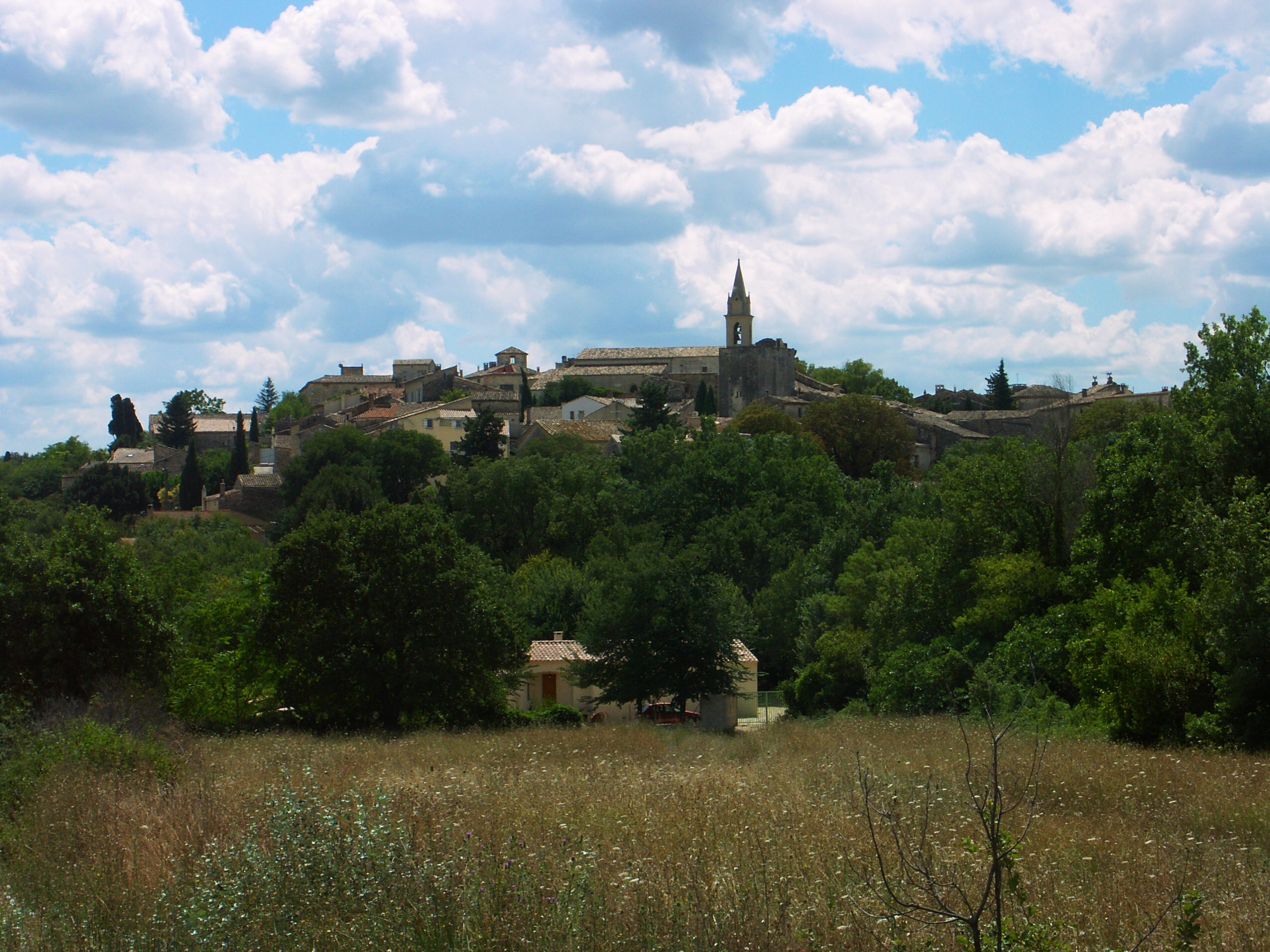
- A general view of Blauzac

- Coat of arms
- Location of Blauzac
- Location within France Location within Occitanie
- Coordinates: 43°57′51″N 4°22′11″E
- Country: France
- Region: Occitania
- Department: Gard
- Arrondissement: Nîmes
- Canton: Uzès

Government
  - Mayor (2020–2026): Serge Bourdanove
- Area^{1}: 15.9 km^{2} (6.1 sq mi)
- Elevation: 125 m (410 ft)
- Highest elevation: 162 m (531 ft)
- Lowest elevation: 47 m (154 ft)
- Population (2023): 1,234
  - Density: 77.6/km^{2} (201/sq mi)
- Time zone: UTC+01:00 (CET)
  - Summer (DST): UTC+02:00 (CEST)
- INSEE/Postal code: 30041 /30700
- ^{1} French Land Register data, which excludes lakes, ponds, glaciers > 1 km^{2} (0.386 sq mi or 247 acres) and river estuaries.

Blauzac (French pronunciation: [blozak]; Occitan: Blausac) is a commune in the Gard department in southern France.

== Population ==
Historical population
Year	Pop.	±% p.a.
1968	393	—
1975	406	+0.47%
1982	516	+3.48%
1990	634	+2.61%
1999	764	+2.09%
2007	1,067	+4.26%
2012	1,187	+2.15%
2017	1,196	+0.15%
2023	1,234	+0.52%
Source: INSEE

== See also ==
- Communes of the Gard department
