= Bourdic =

Commune in Occitanie, France

- Commune
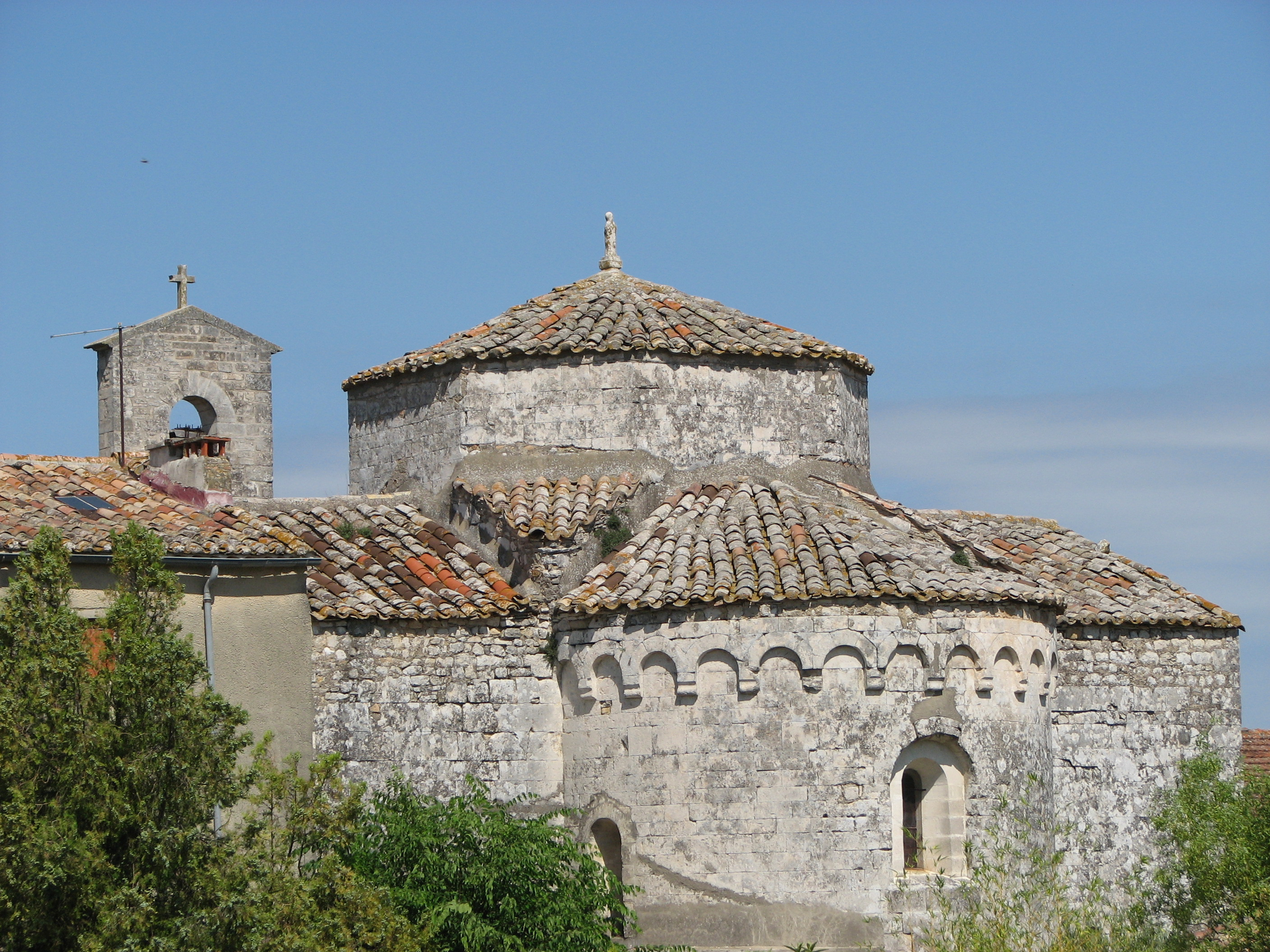
- The church of Bourdic

- Coat of arms
- Location of Bourdic
- Location within France Location within Occitanie
- Coordinates: 43°59′03″N 4°19′52″E
- Country: France
- Region: Occitania
- Department: Gard
- Arrondissement: Nîmes
- Canton: Uzès

Government
  - Mayor (2020–2026): Christophe Gervais
- Area^{1}: 7.34 km^{2} (2.83 sq mi)
- Elevation: 86 m (282 ft)
- Highest elevation: 110 m (360 ft)
- Lowest elevation: 69 m (226 ft)
- Population (2023): 359
  - Density: 48.9/km^{2} (127/sq mi)
- Time zone: UTC+01:00 (CET)
  - Summer (DST): UTC+02:00 (CEST)
- INSEE/Postal code: 30049 /30190
- ^{1} French Land Register data, which excludes lakes, ponds, glaciers > 1 km^{2} (0.386 sq mi or 247 acres) and river estuaries.

Bourdic (French pronunciation: [buʁdik]; Occitan: Bordic) is a commune in the Gard department in southern France. The village is part of greater Nîmes.

== Population ==
Historical population
Year	Pop.	±% p.a.
1968	208	—
1975	202	−0.42%
1982	211	+0.62%
1990	236	+1.41%
1999	262	+1.17%
2007	312	+2.21%
2012	403	+5.25%
2017	380	−1.17%
2023	359	−0.94%
Source: INSEE

== Wine ==
The village is entirely orientated on vineyards. On one hand, the biggest wine coop of the department Gard is situated in the centre of Bourdic. The village also has two private wineries. The labels are Collines de Bourdic, Domaine Chabrier, and Domaine Perdrix-Lasouche.

== See also ==
- Communes of the Gard department
