= Mauressargues =

- Commune
- Coat of arms
- Location of Mauressargues
- Location within France Location within Occitanie
- Coordinates: 43°57′38″N 4°09′35″E
- Country: France
- Region: Occitania
- Department: Gard
- Arrondissement: Nîmes
- Canton: Quissac
- Intercommunality: CA Nîmes Métropole

Government
  - Mayor (2020–2026): Christine Lefevre
- Area^{1}: 5.85 km^{2} (2.26 sq mi)
- Elevation: 170 m (560 ft)
- Highest elevation: 193 m (633 ft)
- Lowest elevation: 94 m (308 ft)
- Population (2023): 188
  - Density: 32.1/km^{2} (83.2/sq mi)
- Time zone: UTC+01:00 (CET)
  - Summer (DST): UTC+02:00 (CEST)
- INSEE/Postal code: 30163 /30350
- ^{1} French Land Register data, which excludes lakes, ponds, glaciers > 1 km^{2} (0.386 sq mi or 247 acres) and river estuaries.

Mauressargues (French pronunciation: [moʁɛsaʁɡ]; Occitan: Maureçargues) is a commune in the Gard department in southern France.

== Population ==
Historical population
Year	Pop.	±% p.a.
1968	95	—
1975	85	−1.58%
1982	98	+2.05%
1990	95	−0.39%
1999	92	−0.36%
2007	141	+5.48%
2012	163	+2.94%
2017	158	−0.62%
2023	188	+2.94%
Source: INSEE

== See also ==
- Communes of the Gard department
