= Collorgues =

Commune in Occitanie, France

- Commune
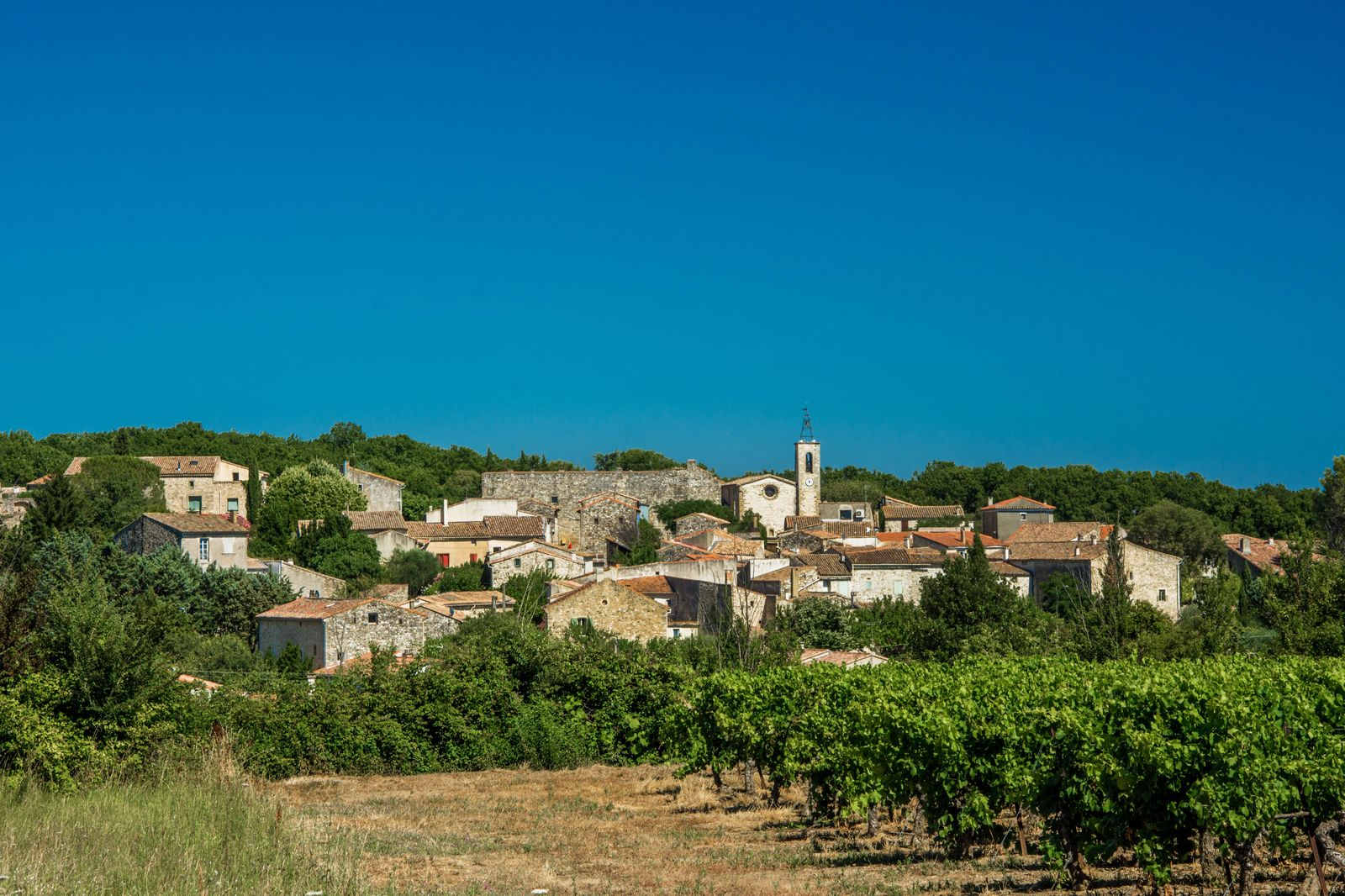
- A general view of Collorgues

- Coat of arms
- Location of Collorgues
- Location within France Location within Occitanie
- Coordinates: 44°00′20″N 4°17′31″E
- Country: France
- Region: Occitania
- Department: Gard
- Arrondissement: Nîmes
- Canton: Uzès

Government
  - Mayor (2020–2026): Micheline Reghenas
- Area^{1}: 9.27 km^{2} (3.58 sq mi)
- Elevation: 152 m (499 ft)
- Highest elevation: 216 m (709 ft)
- Lowest elevation: 109 m (358 ft)
- Population (2023): 671
  - Density: 72.4/km^{2} (187/sq mi)
- Time zone: UTC+01:00 (CET)
  - Summer (DST): UTC+02:00 (CEST)
- INSEE/Postal code: 30086 /30190
- ^{1} French Land Register data, which excludes lakes, ponds, glaciers > 1 km^{2} (0.386 sq mi or 247 acres) and river estuaries.

Collorgues (French pronunciation: [kɔlɔʁɡ]; Occitan: Colòrgas) is a commune in the Gard department in southern France.

== Population ==
Historical population
Year	Pop.	±% p.a.
1968	196	—
1975	196	+0.00%
1982	210	+0.99%
1990	309	+4.95%
1999	359	+1.68%
2007	509	+4.46%
2012	550	+1.56%
2017	608	+2.03%
2023	671	+1.66%
Source: INSEE

== See also ==
- Communes of the Gard department
