= Pougnadoresse =

- Commune
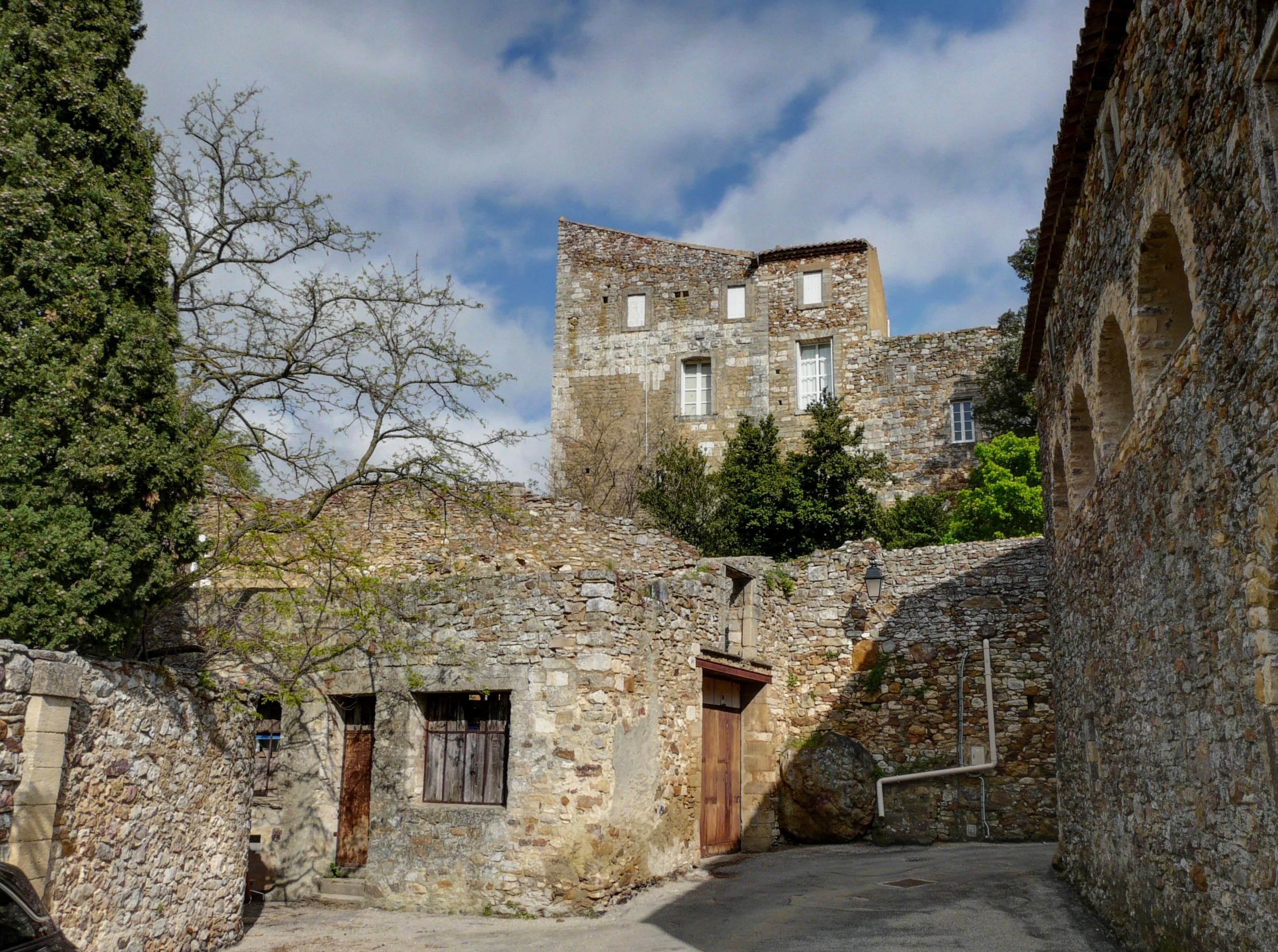

- Coat of arms
- Location of Pougnadoresse
- Location within France Location within Occitanie
- Coordinates: 44°05′36″N 4°30′25″E
- Country: France
- Region: Occitania
- Department: Gard
- Arrondissement: Nîmes
- Canton: Uzès

Government
  - Mayor (2020–2026): Dominique Serre
- Area^{1}: 7.65 km^{2} (2.95 sq mi)
- Elevation: 221 m (725 ft)
- Highest elevation: 241 m (791 ft)
- Lowest elevation: 120 m (390 ft)
- Population (2023): 271
  - Density: 35.4/km^{2} (91.7/sq mi)
- Time zone: UTC+01:00 (CET)
  - Summer (DST): UTC+02:00 (CEST)
- INSEE/Postal code: 30205 /30330
- ^{1} French Land Register data, which excludes lakes, ponds, glaciers > 1 km^{2} (0.386 sq mi or 247 acres) and river estuaries.

Pougnadoresse (French pronunciation: [puɲadɔʁɛs]; Occitan: Pinhadorèissa) is a commune in the Gard department in southern France.

== Population ==
Historical population
Year	Pop.	±% p.a.
1968	134	—
1975	126	−0.88%
1982	123	−0.34%
1990	131	+0.79%
1999	165	+2.60%
2007	192	+1.91%
2012	236	+4.21%
2017	246	+0.83%
2023	271	+1.63%
Source: INSEE

== See also ==
- Communes of the Gard department
