= Serviers-et-Labaume =

- Commune
- Coat of arms
- Location of Serviers-et-Labaume
- Location within France Location within Occitanie
- Coordinates: 44°02′19″N 4°21′21″E
- Country: France
- Region: Occitania
- Department: Gard
- Arrondissement: Nîmes
- Canton: Uzès

Government
  - Mayor (2020–2026): Francis Mazier
- Area^{1}: 12.22 km^{2} (4.72 sq mi)
- Elevation: 145 m (476 ft)
- Highest elevation: 271 m (889 ft)
- Lowest elevation: 94 m (308 ft)
- Population (2023): 590
  - Density: 48/km^{2} (130/sq mi)
- Time zone: UTC+01:00 (CET)
  - Summer (DST): UTC+02:00 (CEST)
- INSEE/Postal code: 30319 /30700
- ^{1} French Land Register data, which excludes lakes, ponds, glaciers > 1 km^{2} (0.386 sq mi or 247 acres) and river estuaries.

Serviers-et-Labaume (French pronunciation: [sɛʁvje e labom]; Occitan: Cervier e la Bauma) is a commune in the Gard department in southern France.

== Population ==
Historical population
Year	Pop.	±% p.a.
1968	177	—
1975	201	+1.83%
1982	242	+2.69%
1990	310	+3.14%
1999	355	+1.52%
2007	482	+3.90%
2012	574	+3.56%
2017	604	+1.02%
2023	590	−0.39%
Source: INSEE

== See also ==
- Communes of the Gard department
