= Aubussargues =

Commune in Occitanie, France

- Commune
- Coat of arms
- Location of Aubussargues
- Location within France Location within Occitanie
- Coordinates: 44°00′28″N 4°19′32″E
- Country: France
- Region: Occitania
- Department: Gard
- Arrondissement: Nîmes
- Canton: Uzès
- Intercommunality: CC Pays d'Uzès

Government
  - Mayor (2020–2026): Christian Chabalier
- Area^{1}: 8.52 km^{2} (3.29 sq mi)
- Elevation: 85 m (279 ft)
- Highest elevation: 213 m (699 ft)
- Lowest elevation: 84 m (276 ft)
- Population (2023): 333
  - Density: 39.1/km^{2} (101/sq mi)
- Time zone: UTC+01:00 (CET)
  - Summer (DST): UTC+02:00 (CEST)
- INSEE/Postal code: 30021 /30190
- ^{1} French Land Register data, which excludes lakes, ponds, glaciers > 1 km^{2} (0.386 sq mi or 247 acres) and river estuaries.

Aubussargues (French pronunciation: [obysaʁɡ]; Occitan: Aubuçargues) is a commune in the Gard department in southern France.

== Population ==
Historical population
| Year | Pop. | ±% p.a. |
|---|---|---|
| 1968 | 185 | — |
| 1975 | 163 | −1.79% |
| 1982 | 164 | +0.09% |
| 1990 | 216 | +3.50% |
| 1999 | 238 | +1.08% |
| 2007 | 324 | +3.93% |
| 2012 | 338 | +0.85% |
| 2017 | 323 | −0.90% |
| 2023 | 333 | +0.51% |
Source: INSEE

== See also ==
- Communes of the Gard department
