= Arpaillargues-et-Aureillac =

Commune in Occitanie, France

- Commune
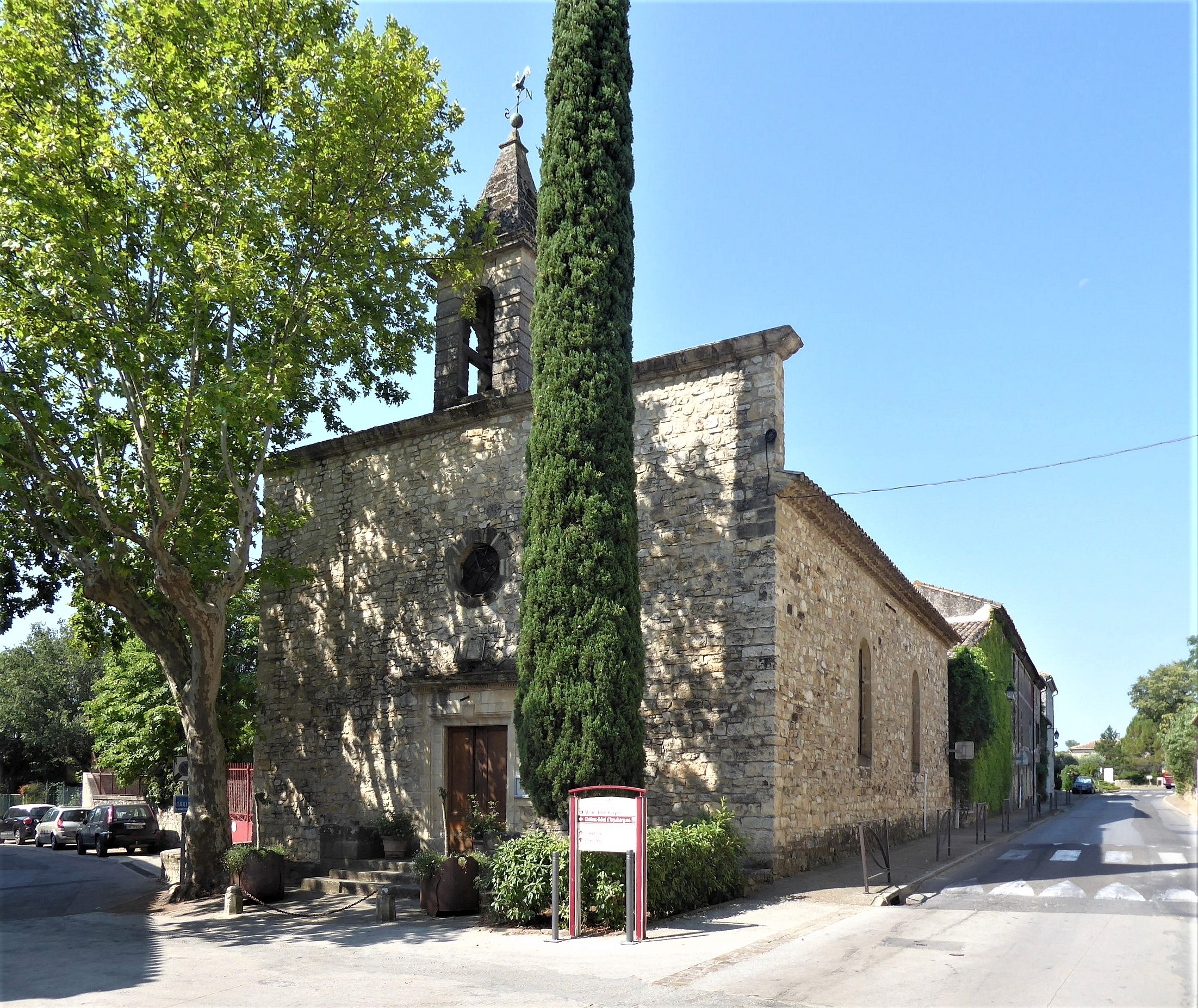
- The protestant church in Arpaillargues-et-Aureillac

- Coat of arms
- Location of Arpaillargues-et-Aureillac
- Location within France Location within Occitanie
- Coordinates: 44°00′05″N 4°22′24″E
- Country: France
- Region: Occitania
- Department: Gard
- Arrondissement: Nîmes
- Canton: Uzès
- Intercommunality: CC Pays d'Uzès

Government
  - Mayor (2020–2026): Gérard Dautreppe
- Area^{1}: 13.67 km^{2} (5.28 sq mi)
- Elevation: 116 m (381 ft)
- Highest elevation: 200 m (660 ft)
- Lowest elevation: 69 m (226 ft)
- Population (2023): 1,039
  - Density: 76.01/km^{2} (196.9/sq mi)
- Time zone: UTC+01:00 (CET)
  - Summer (DST): UTC+02:00 (CEST)
- INSEE/Postal code: 30014 /30700
- ^{1} French Land Register data, which excludes lakes, ponds, glaciers > 1 km^{2} (0.386 sq mi or 247 acres) and river estuaries.

Arpaillargues-et-Aureillac (French pronunciation: [aʁpajaʁɡ e oʁɛjak]; Occitan: Arpalhargues e Aurelhac) is a commune in the Gard department in southern France.

== Population ==
Historical population
Year	Pop.	±% p.a.
1968	265	—
1975	309	+2.22%
1982	459	+5.82%
1990	667	+4.78%
1999	785	+1.83%
2007	972	+2.71%
2012	1,053	+1.61%
2017	1,009	−0.85%
2023	1,039	+0.49%
Source: INSEE

== See also ==
- Communes of the Gard department
