= Sanilhac-Sagriès =

- Commune
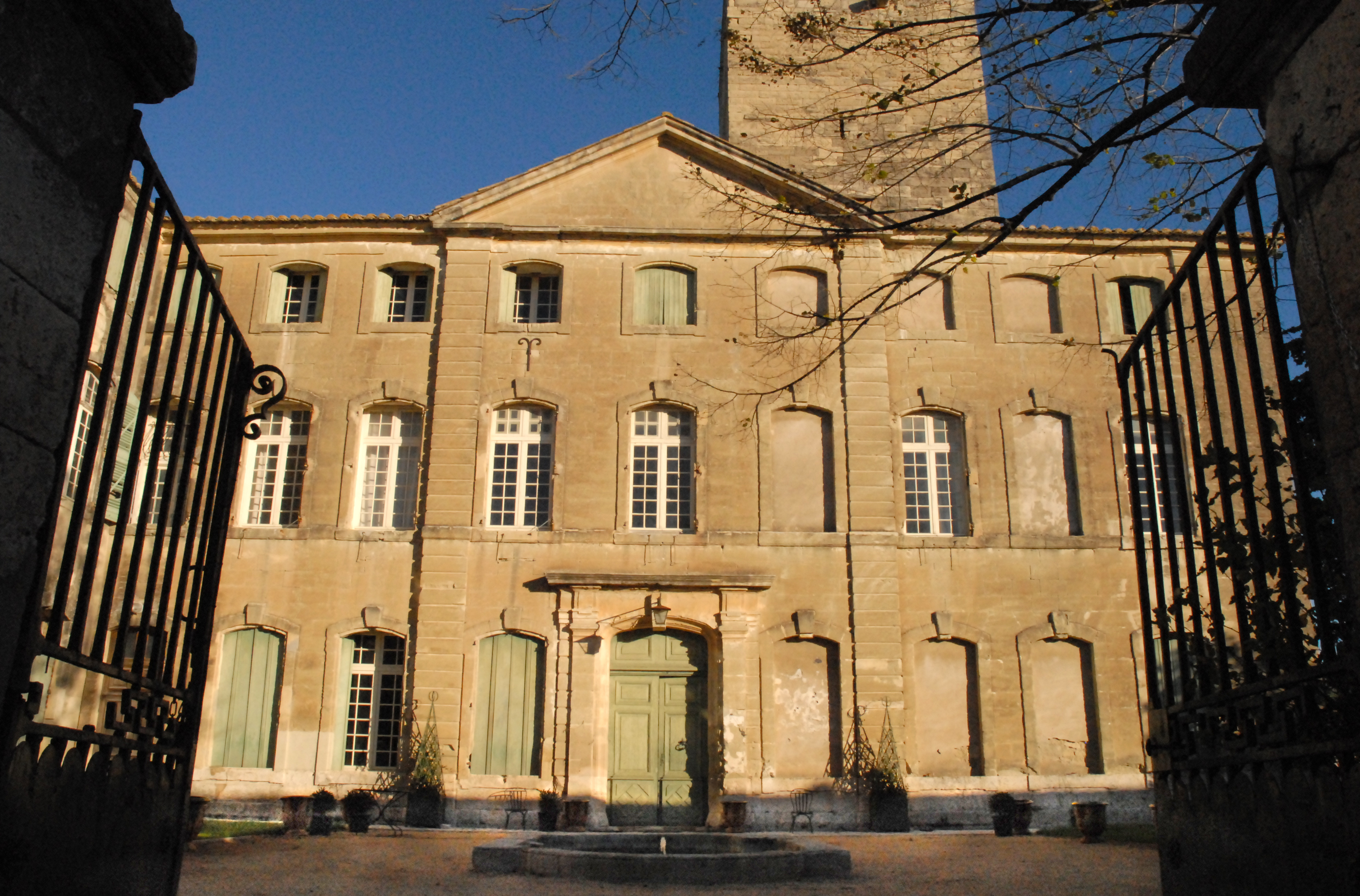
- Chateau

- Coat of arms
- Location of Sanilhac-Sagriès
- Location within France Location within Occitanie
- Coordinates: 43°57′21″N 4°25′31″E
- Country: France
- Region: Occitania
- Department: Gard
- Arrondissement: Nîmes
- Canton: Uzès

Government
  - Mayor (2020–2026): Denis Veyrunes
- Area^{1}: 22.1 km^{2} (8.5 sq mi)
- Elevation: 105 m (344 ft)
- Highest elevation: 202 m (663 ft)
- Lowest elevation: 30 m (98 ft)
- Population (2023): 842
  - Density: 38.1/km^{2} (98.7/sq mi)
- Time zone: UTC+01:00 (CET)
  - Summer (DST): UTC+02:00 (CEST)
- INSEE/Postal code: 30308 /30700
- ^{1} French Land Register data, which excludes lakes, ponds, glaciers > 1 km^{2} (0.386 sq mi or 247 acres) and river estuaries.

Sanilhac-Sagriès (French pronunciation: [sanijak saɡʁijɛs]; Occitan: Sanilhac e Sagriers) is a commune in the Gard department in southern France.

== Population ==
Historical population
Year	Pop.	±% p.a.
1968	440	—
1975	442	+0.06%
1982	525	+2.49%
1990	643	+2.57%
1999	785	+2.24%
2007	819	+0.53%
2012	901	+1.93%
2017	780	−2.84%
2023	842	+1.28%
Source: INSEE

== See also ==
- Communes of the Gard department
