= Saint-Dézéry =

- Commune
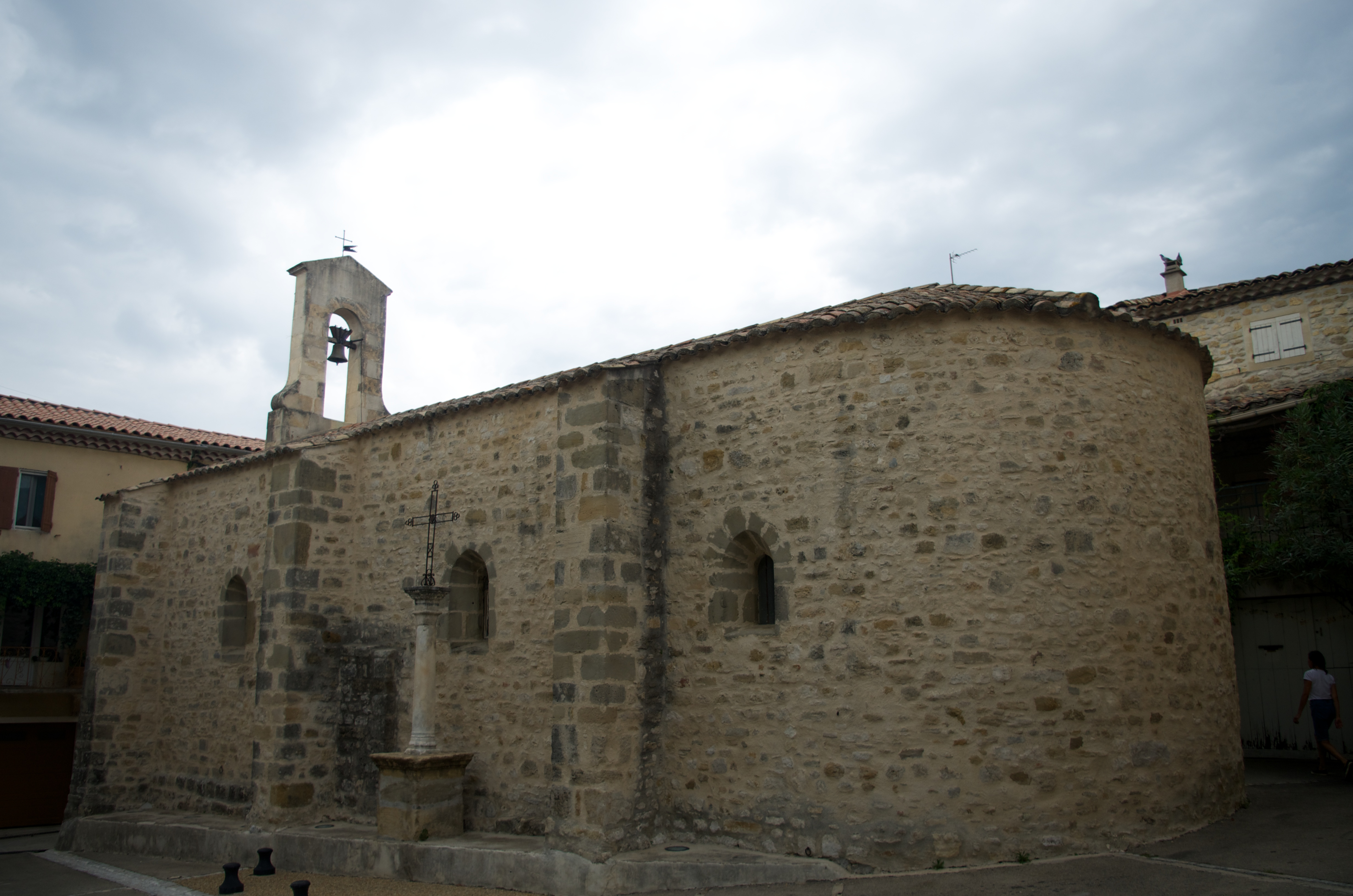
- The church of Saint-Dézéry

- Coat of arms
- Location of Saint-Dézéry
- Location within France Location within Occitanie
- Coordinates: 44°00′07″N 4°16′14″E
- Country: France
- Region: Occitania
- Department: Gard
- Arrondissement: Nîmes
- Canton: Uzès

Government
  - Mayor (2020–2026): Bernard Dailcroix
- Area^{1}: 6.01 km^{2} (2.32 sq mi)
- Elevation: 70 m (230 ft)
- Highest elevation: 196 m (643 ft)
- Lowest elevation: 81 m (266 ft)
- Population (2023): 457
  - Density: 76.0/km^{2} (197/sq mi)
- Time zone: UTC+01:00 (CET)
  - Summer (DST): UTC+02:00 (CEST)
- INSEE/Postal code: 30248 /30190
- ^{1} French Land Register data, which excludes lakes, ponds, glaciers > 1 km^{2} (0.386 sq mi or 247 acres) and river estuaries.

Saint-Dézéry (French pronunciation: [sɛ̃ dezeʁi]; Occitan: Sent Desèri) is a commune in the Gard department in southern France.

== Population ==
Historical population
Year	Pop.	±% p.a.
1968	158	—
1975	138	−1.91%
1982	146	+0.81%
1990	220	+5.26%
1999	251	+1.48%
2007	326	+3.32%
2012	400	+4.18%
2017	450	+2.38%
2023	457	+0.26%
Source: INSEE

== See also ==
- Communes of the Gard department
