= Fontarèches =

- Commune
- Coat of arms
- Location of Fontarèches
- Location within France Location within Occitanie
- Coordinates: 44°06′33″N 4°26′19″E
- Country: France
- Region: Occitania
- Department: Gard
- Arrondissement: Nîmes
- Canton: Uzès
- Intercommunality: Pays d'Uzès

Government
  - Mayor (2020–2026): Patrick Mejean
- Area^{1}: 13.42 km^{2} (5.18 sq mi)
- Elevation: 250 m (820 ft)
- Highest elevation: 307 m (1,007 ft)
- Lowest elevation: 153 m (502 ft)
- Population (2023): 256
  - Density: 19.1/km^{2} (49.4/sq mi)
- Time zone: UTC+01:00 (CET)
  - Summer (DST): UTC+02:00 (CEST)
- INSEE/Postal code: 30115 /30580
- ^{1} French Land Register data, which excludes lakes, ponds, glaciers > 1 km^{2} (0.386 sq mi or 247 acres) and river estuaries.

Fontarèches (French pronunciation: [fɔ̃taʁɛʃ]; Occitan: Fontarecha [fun.taˈɾe.tʃo]) is a commune in the Gard department in southern France.

== Population ==
Historical population
Year	Pop.	±% p.a.
1968	108	—
1975	76	−4.90%
1982	89	+2.28%
1990	148	+6.56%
1999	190	+2.81%
2007	227	+2.25%
2012	251	+2.03%
2017	263	+0.94%
2023	256	−0.45%
Source: INSEE

== See also ==
- Communes of the Gard department
