= Dions =

- Commune
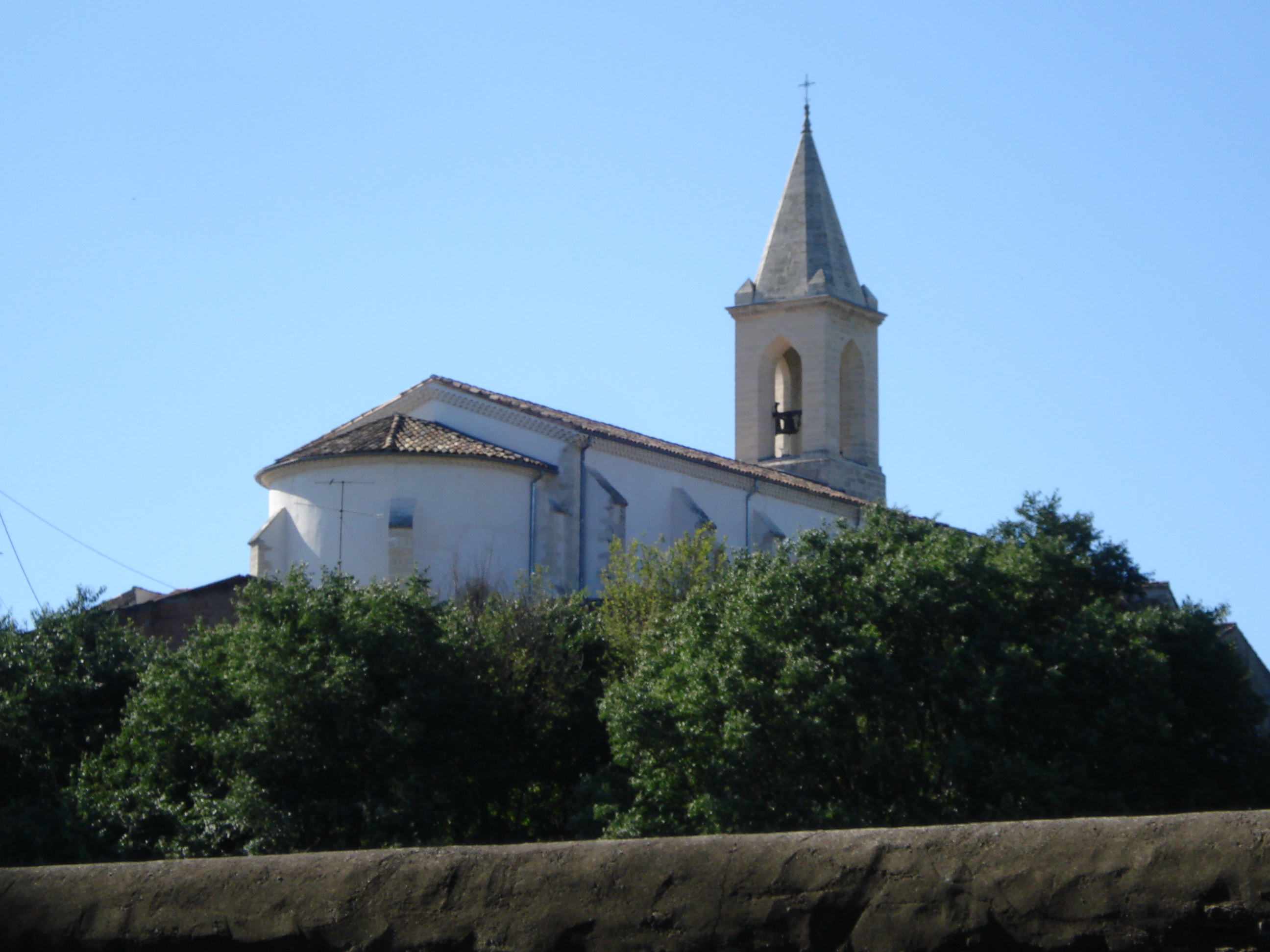
- The church of Dions

- Coat of arms
- Location of Dions
- Location within France Location within Occitanie
- Coordinates: 43°55′57″N 4°17′50″E
- Country: France
- Region: Occitania
- Department: Gard
- Arrondissement: Nîmes
- Canton: Uzès
- Intercommunality: CA Nîmes Métropole

Government
  - Mayor (2020–2026): Gérard Theotime
- Area^{1}: 11.32 km^{2} (4.37 sq mi)
- Elevation: 42 m (138 ft)
- Highest elevation: 175 m (574 ft)
- Lowest elevation: 52 m (171 ft)
- Population (2023): 527
  - Density: 46.6/km^{2} (121/sq mi)
- Time zone: UTC+01:00 (CET)
  - Summer (DST): UTC+02:00 (CEST)
- INSEE/Postal code: 30102 /30190
- ^{1} French Land Register data, which excludes lakes, ponds, glaciers > 1 km^{2} (0.386 sq mi or 247 acres) and river estuaries.

Dions (French pronunciation: [djɔ̃s]) is a commune in the Gard department in southern France.

== Population ==
Historical population
Year	Pop.	±% p.a.
1968	378	—
1975	377	−0.04%
1982	393	+0.60%
1990	453	+1.79%
1999	522	+1.59%
2007	540	+0.42%
2012	598	+2.06%
2017	584	−0.47%
2023	527	−1.70%
Source: INSEE

== See also ==
- Communes of the Gard department
