= Saint-Laurent-la-Vernède =

- Commune
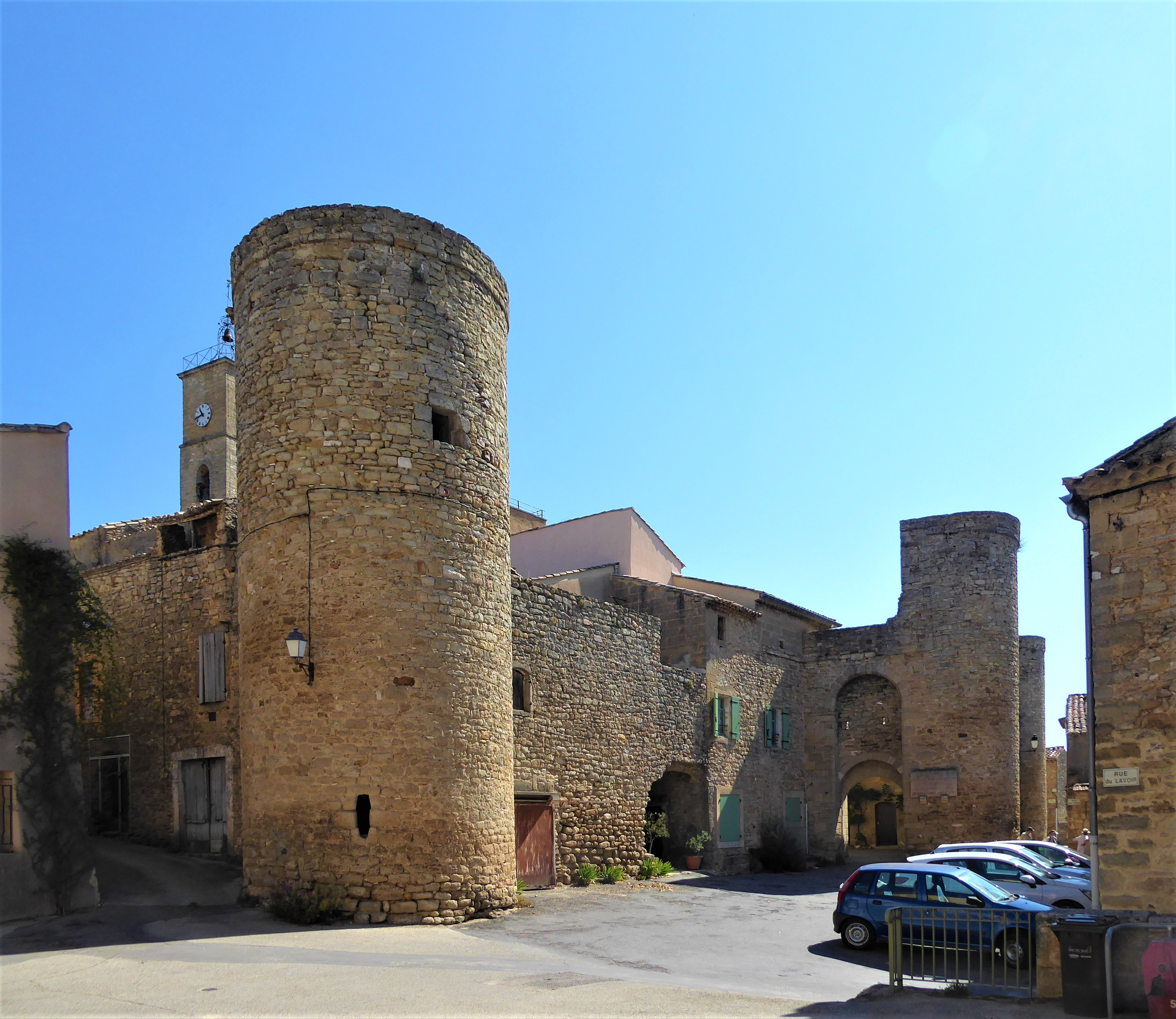
- The fort in Saint-Laurent-la-Vernède

- Coat of arms
- Location of Saint-Laurent-la-Vernède
- Location within France Location within Occitanie
- Coordinates: 44°06′21″N 4°27′31″E
- Country: France
- Region: Occitania
- Department: Gard
- Arrondissement: Nîmes
- Canton: Uzès
- Intercommunality: Pays d'Uzès

Government
  - Mayor (2020–2026): Joseph Guardiola
- Area^{1}: 11.8 km^{2} (4.6 sq mi)
- Elevation: 212 m (696 ft)
- Highest elevation: 302 m (991 ft)
- Lowest elevation: 177 m (581 ft)
- Population (2023): 709
  - Density: 60.1/km^{2} (156/sq mi)
- Time zone: UTC+01:00 (CET)
  - Summer (DST): UTC+02:00 (CEST)
- INSEE/Postal code: 30279 /30330
- ^{1} French Land Register data, which excludes lakes, ponds, glaciers > 1 km^{2} (0.386 sq mi or 247 acres) and river estuaries.

Saint-Laurent-la-Vernède (French pronunciation: [sɛ̃ loʁɑ̃ la vɛʁnɛd]; Occitan: Sent Laurenç de la Verneda) is a commune in the Gard department in southern France.

== History ==
You must go back to the year 1122 to discover the name of St. Laurent on a document: "villa Sancti Laurentii."

In the early 13th century, Brémond I, Raimond I, and Elzias I, members of the house of Uzès, were the first known lords of Saint Laurent.

The fort of St. Laurent la Vernède was built, starting in June 1445, by several prominent families of the village. In 1446, they signed a contract before a notary that assured them certain spaces in the fort, depending on their contribution to the construction of the walls or "barris." They also demanded the right to build houses inside it, which would be sheltered from the frequent wars of the period.

The church, which certainly dates from the 12th century, became Protestant during the 16th and 17th centuries. The Protestants of the neighboring villages who had no church of their own came to St. Laurent, following the path of the Huguenots whose name has remained in our collective memory.

When the Edict of Nantes was revoked, the Protestant church became Catholic once again. All the rights granted to Protestants by Henri IV were taken away by Louis XIV, and Protestants were also forced to abjure their religion.

1746 marks the beginning of a court case that lasted until the Revolution. It opposed Joseph de Thomas, known as "le Grand Joseph," primicier of Avignon, to the community over the communal forests.

The case was finished, after 42 years, on 22 July 1788, by an agreement that gave the lord a fourth of the timber cut in the forest. But it was no longer time for legal proceedings; the people of St. Laurent had something else to contend with: the Revolution.

== Population ==
Historical population
Year	Pop.	±% p.a.
1968	238	—
1975	295	+3.11%
1982	380	+3.68%
1990	535	+4.37%
1999	592	+1.13%
2007	693	+1.99%
2012	744	+1.43%
2017	681	−1.75%
2023	709	+0.67%
Source: INSEE

== See also ==
- Communes of the Gard department
- City website
