= Garrigues-Sainte-Eulalie =

- Commune
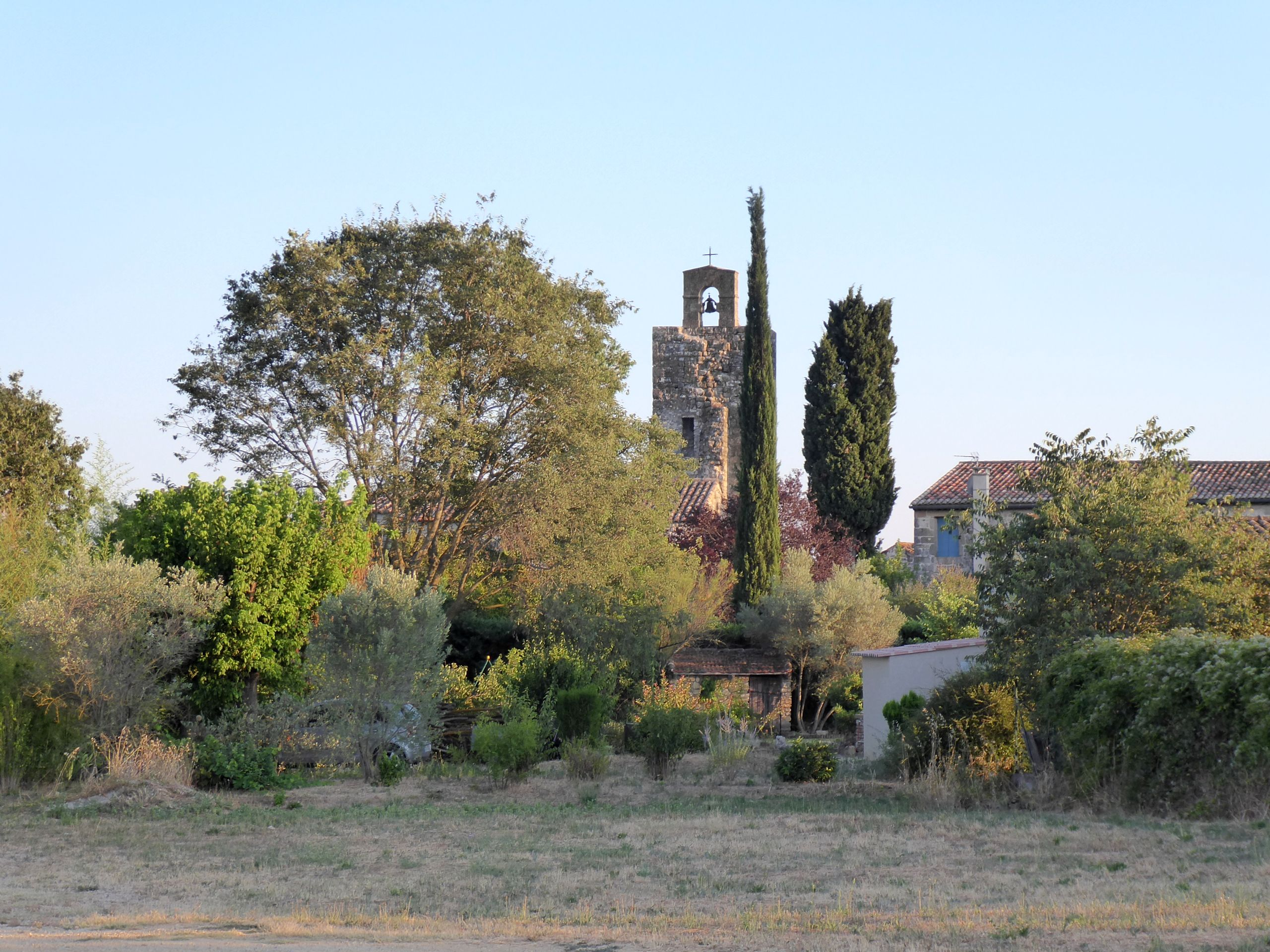

- Coat of arms
- Location of Garrigues-Sainte-Eulalie
- Location within France Location within Occitanie
- Coordinates: 43°59′39″N 4°18′57″E
- Country: France
- Region: Occitania
- Department: Gard
- Arrondissement: Nîmes
- Canton: Uzès

Government
  - Mayor (2020–2026): Didier Kielpinski
- Area^{1}: 10 km^{2} (3.9 sq mi)
- Elevation: 120 m (390 ft)
- Highest elevation: 215 m (705 ft)
- Lowest elevation: 75 m (246 ft)
- Population (2023): 776
  - Density: 78/km^{2} (200/sq mi)
- Time zone: UTC+01:00 (CET)
  - Summer (DST): UTC+02:00 (CEST)
- INSEE/Postal code: 30126 /30190
- ^{1} French Land Register data, which excludes lakes, ponds, glaciers > 1 km^{2} (0.386 sq mi or 247 acres) and river estuaries.

Garrigues-Sainte-Eulalie (French pronunciation: [gaʁig sɛ̃t‿ølali]; Provençal: Garriga e Senta Olha) is a commune in the Gard department in southern France. It lies 54 km (34 mi) from Montpellier.

== Population ==
The residents are called Garrigois.

Historical population
Year	Pop.	±% p.a.
1968	253	—
1975	281	+1.51%
1982	304	+1.13%
1990	388	+3.10%
1999	516	+3.22%
2007	715	+4.16%
2012	764	+1.33%
2017	731	−0.88%
2023	776	+1.00%
Source: INSEE

== History ==
Traces of the early peoples of the "Fontbouisse culture" have been discovered, as well as many Roman ruins. The area was a feudal domain belonging to the Duke of Uzès.

Before 1789 this commune was in two parts: Garrigues and Sainte-Eulalie. During the French Revolution the two communes were combined and given the name Canteperdrix. In 1814 the combined commune was maintained under the name Garrigues-et-Sainte Eulalie, and on 16 February 1976 the current hyphenated form was adopted.

== Economy ==
The local economy includes general agriculture, vineyards. orchards and sheep raising.

== Architecture ==
The 19th century Sainte-Eulalie Church was built on the ruins of a former fortified castle, which burned in 1704. Its tower is now the clock-tower of the church. The castle was deeded to the Bourdic factory in the 19th century. There is a later, 19th century, castle in the Garrigues region of the town.

== See also ==
- Communes of the Gard department
