= Canton of Uzès =

Coordinates: 44.01°N 4.42°E

The canton of Uzès is an administrative division of the Gard department, southern France. Its borders were modified at the French canton reorganisation which came into effect in March 2015. Its seat is in Uzès.

It consists of the following communes:

1. Aigaliers
2. Arpaillargues-et-Aureillac
3. Aubussargues
4. Baron
5. La Bastide-d'Engras
6. Blauzac
7. Bourdic
8. La Bruguière
9. La Calmette
10. La Capelle-et-Masmolène
11. Collorgues
12. Dions
13. Flaux
14. Foissac
15. Fontarèches
16. Garrigues-Sainte-Eulalie
17. Montaren-et-Saint-Médiers
18. Pougnadoresse
19. Saint-Chaptes
20. Saint-Dézéry
21. Sainte-Anastasie
22. Saint-Hippolyte-de-Montaigu
23. Saint-Laurent-la-Vernède
24. Saint-Maximin
25. Saint-Quentin-la-Poterie
26. Saint-Siffret
27. Saint-Victor-des-Oules
28. Sanilhac-Sagriès
29. Serviers-et-Labaume
30. Uzès
31. Vallabrix
