= Aigaliers =

Commune in Occitanie, France

- Commune
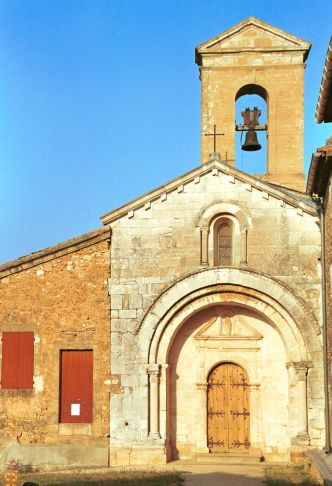
- The church in the hamlet of Gattigues

- Coat of arms
- Location of Aigaliers
- Location within France Location within Occitanie
- Coordinates: 44°03′37″N 4°19′16″E
- Country: France
- Region: Occitania
- Department: Gard
- Arrondissement: Nîmes
- Canton: Uzès
- Intercommunality: Pays d'Uzès

Government
  - Mayor (2020–2026): Daniel Boyer
- Area^{1}: 28.06 km^{2} (10.83 sq mi)
- Elevation: 212 m (696 ft)
- Highest elevation: 350 m (1,150 ft)
- Lowest elevation: 117 m (384 ft)
- Population (2023): 540
  - Density: 19/km^{2} (50/sq mi)
- Time zone: UTC+01:00 (CET)
  - Summer (DST): UTC+02:00 (CEST)
- INSEE/Postal code: 30001 /30700
- ^{1} French Land Register data, which excludes lakes, ponds, glaciers > 1 km^{2} (0.386 sq mi or 247 acres) and river estuaries.

Aigaliers (French pronunciation: [ɛɡalje]; Occitan: Aigalier) is a commune in the Gard department in southern France.

== Population ==
Historical population
Year	Pop.	±% p.a.
1968	224	—
1975	241	+1.05%
1982	257	+0.92%
1990	306	+2.21%
1999	386	+2.61%
2007	467	+2.41%
2012	483	+0.68%
2017	507	+0.97%
2023	540	+1.06%
Source: INSEE

== See also ==
- Communes of the Gard department
