= Foissac, Gard =

Foissac
- Commune
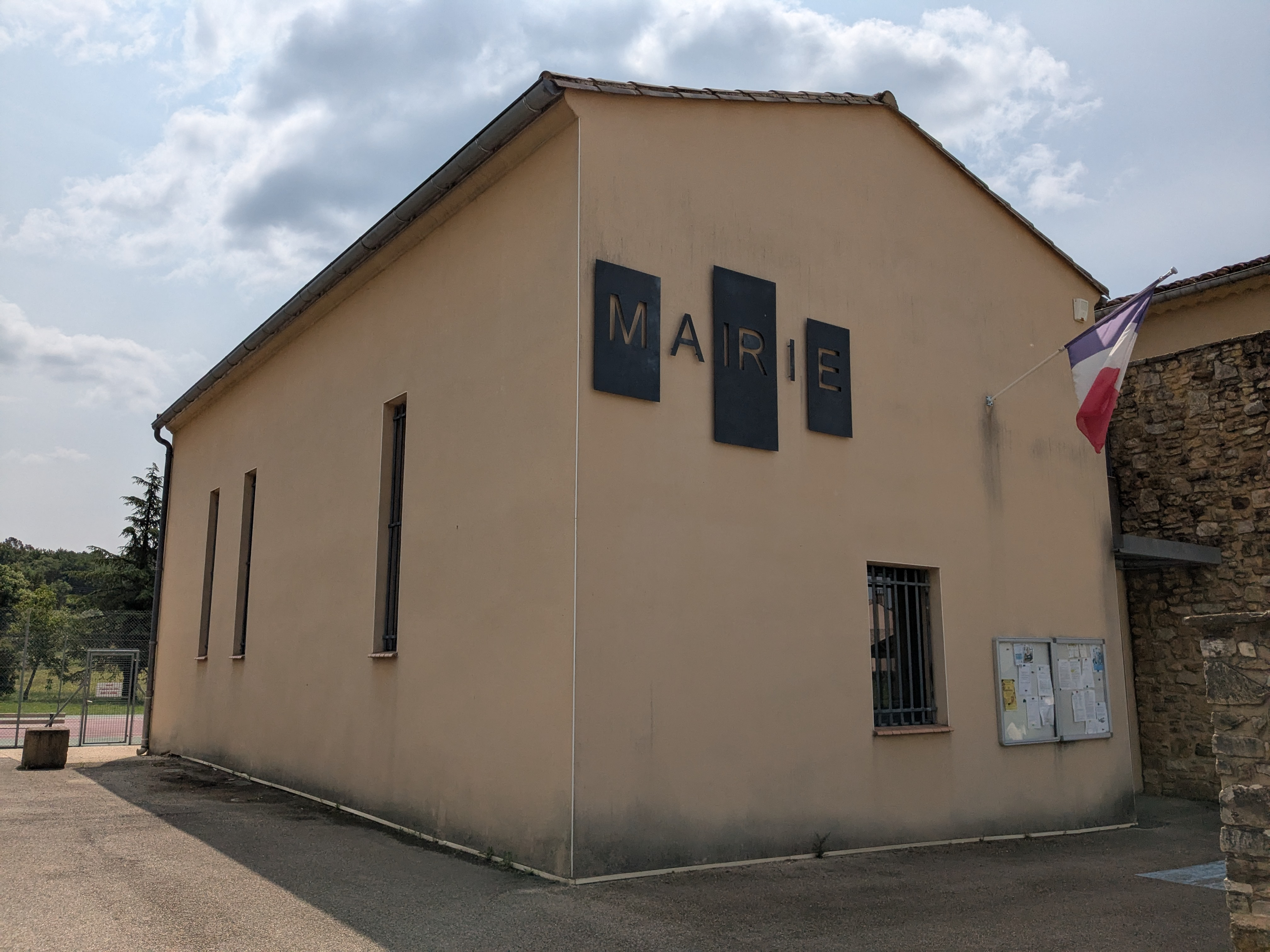
- Foissac Town hall

- Coat of arms
- Location of Foissac
- Location within France Location within Occitanie
- Coordinates: 44°02′38″N 4°17′56″E
- Country: France
- Region: Occitania
- Department: Gard
- Arrondissement: Nîmes
- Canton: Uzès

Government
  - Mayor (2020–2026): Joël Amalric
- Area^{1}: 3.8 km^{2} (1.5 sq mi)
- Elevation: 130 m (430 ft)
- Highest elevation: 191 m (627 ft)
- Lowest elevation: 115 m (377 ft)
- Population (2023): 445
  - Density: 120/km^{2} (300/sq mi)
- Time zone: UTC+01:00 (CET)
  - Summer (DST): UTC+02:00 (CEST)
- INSEE/Postal code: 30111 /30700
- ^{1} French Land Register data, which excludes lakes, ponds, glaciers > 1 km^{2} (0.386 sq mi or 247 acres) and river estuaries.

Foissac (French pronunciation: [fwasak]) is a commune in the Gard department in southern France.

== Population ==
Historical population
Year	Pop.	±% p.a.
1968	130	—
1975	163	+3.28%
1982	183	+1.67%
1990	223	+2.50%
1999	269	+2.11%
2007	325	+2.39%
2012	421	+5.31%
2017	423	+0.09%
2023	445	+0.85%
Source: INSEE

== See also ==
- Communes of the Gard department
