= La Bruguière =

Commune in Occitanie, France

- Commune
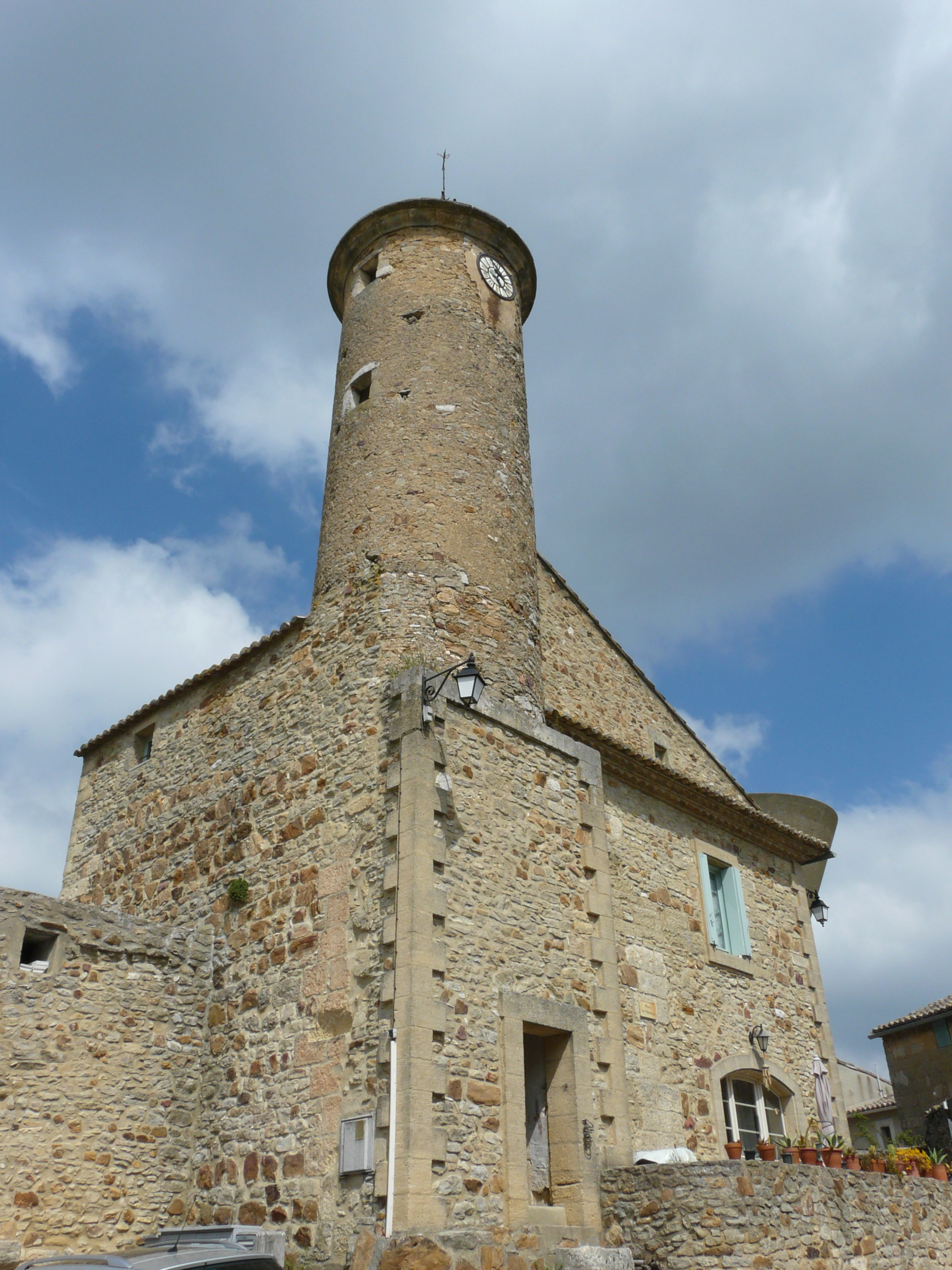
- Romanesque tower in La Bruguière

- Coat of arms
- Location of La Bruguière
- Location within France Location within Occitanie
- Coordinates: 44°06′43″N 4°24′48″E
- Country: France
- Region: Occitania
- Department: Gard
- Arrondissement: Nîmes
- Canton: Uzès

Government
  - Mayor (2020–2026): Didier Godefroy
- Area^{1}: 16.43 km^{2} (6.34 sq mi)
- Elevation: 274 m (899 ft)
- Highest elevation: 320 m (1,050 ft)
- Lowest elevation: 228 m (748 ft)
- Population (2023): 332
  - Density: 20.2/km^{2} (52.3/sq mi)
- Time zone: UTC+01:00 (CET)
  - Summer (DST): UTC+02:00 (CEST)
- INSEE/Postal code: 30056 /30580
- ^{1} French Land Register data, which excludes lakes, ponds, glaciers > 1 km^{2} (0.386 sq mi or 247 acres) and river estuaries.

La Bruguière (French pronunciation: [la bʁyɡjɛʁ]; Occitan: La Bruguièira) is a commune dating back to the Middle Ages in the Gard department in southern France.

== Geography ==
Equidistant from the Cévennes and from the Mediterranean Sea, between the rivers of the Cèze and the Gardon, close to the larger cities of Avignon, Nimes and Alès, as well as Uzès, the village has been a historical center in the region for centuries. La Bruguière is essentially an agricultural village despite its small touristic interest. There is no village cafe or commerce, but there are interesting medieval era stone buildings.

== Population ==
Historical population
Year	Pop.	±% p.a.
1968	172	—
1975	158	−1.21%
1982	188	+2.51%
1990	184	−0.27%
1999	182	−0.12%
2007	280	+5.53%
2012	329	+3.28%
2017	328	−0.06%
2023	332	+0.20%
Source: INSEE

== Administration ==
Period	Identity	Party
Elected in March 2001 until 2014	Michel Reboulet	Miscellaneous left
Elected in March 2014 until 2020	Didier Godefroy	Independent politician

== Places and Monuments ==
- Belfry mounted on a 12th-century Roman tower.
- Maze of little alleys surrounding the old village.
- 4 medieval stone lavoirs or wash-houses.
