= Cantons of Nîmes =

Coordinates: 43.84°N 4.36°E

The cantons of Nîmes are administrative divisions of the Gard department, in southern France. Since the French canton reorganisation which came into effect in March 2015, the city of Nîmes is subdivided into 4 cantons. Their seat is in Nîmes. A small part of Nîmes is part of the canton of Saint-Gilles.

== Population ==
| Name | Population (2019) | Cantonal Code |
|---|---|---|
| Canton of Nîmes-1 | 36,585 | 3010 |
| Canton of Nîmes-2 | 37,262 | 3011 |
| Canton of Nîmes-3 | 36,788 | 3012 |
| Canton of Nîmes-4 | 37,419 | 3013 |
