= Durfort =

Durfort may refer to:

== Places ==
Durfort is the name or part of the name of several communes in France:

- Durfort, Ariège, in the Ariège département
- Durfort, Tarn, in the Tarn département
- Durfort-et-Saint-Martin-de-Sossenac, in the Gard département
- Durfort-Lacapelette, in the Tarn-et-Garonne département

== People ==
- Durfort (family)
