= Massanes =

Massanes may refer to:

- Massanes, Catalonia, a municipality in Catalonia, Spain
- Massanes, Gard, a commune in the Gard department, France
