= Cassagnoles =

Cassagnoles is the name or part of the name of several communes in France:

- Cassagnoles, in the Gard department
- Cassagnoles, in the Hérault department
