= Moussac =

Moussac is the name or part of the name of several communes in France:

- Moussac, in the Gard department
- Moussac, in the Vienne department
