= Saint-Nazaire (disambiguation) =

Saint-Nazaire is the French form of Saint Nazarius and the name or part of the name of several places:

== Canada ==
- Saint-Nazaire, a municipality in Quebec
- Saint-Nazaire-d'Acton, a municipality in Quebec
- Saint-Nazaire-de-Dorchester, a municipality in Quebec

== France ==
Saint-Nazaire is the name or part of the name of several communes in France:

- Saint-Nazaire, Gard, in the Gard département
- Saint-Nazaire, in the Loire-Atlantique département
- Saint-Nazaire, Pyrénées-Orientales, in the Pyrénées-Orientales département
- Saint-Nazaire-d'Aude, in the Aude département
- Saint-Nazaire-de-Ladarez, in the Hérault département
- Saint-Nazaire-de-Pézan, in the Hérault département
- Saint-Nazaire-des-Gardies, in the Gard département
- Saint-Nazaire-de-Valentane, in the Tarn-et-Garonne département
- Saint-Nazaire-en-Royans, in the Drôme département
- Saint-Nazaire-le-Désert, in the Drôme département
- Saint-Nazaire-les-Eymes, in the Isère département
- Saint-Nazaire-sur-Charente, in the Charente-Maritime département
- Saint-Nazaire, French Guiana, in French Guiana
- Saint-Nazaire River, a river of northern France, tributary of the Souchez, the name of the higher part of the Deûle. It crosses Ablain-Saint-Nazaire.

See also the St. Nazaire Raid.
