= Benezet (disambiguation) =

The name Benezet or the accented Bénézet may refer to:

== People ==
- Saint Benezet (c. 1163 – 1184), medieval saint
- Anthony Benezet (1713–1784), Quaker educationalist
- Louis P. Bénézet (1878–1961), American educationalist
- Louis T. Benezet (1915–2002), American educationalist (son of the above)
- Mathieu Bénézet (1946–2013), French author
- Nicolas Benezet (born 1991), French football player

== Places ==
- Pont Saint-Bénezet, a bridge in Avignon
- Saint-Bénézet, a commune in Gard, France
