= Georges Dumas =

French psychologist

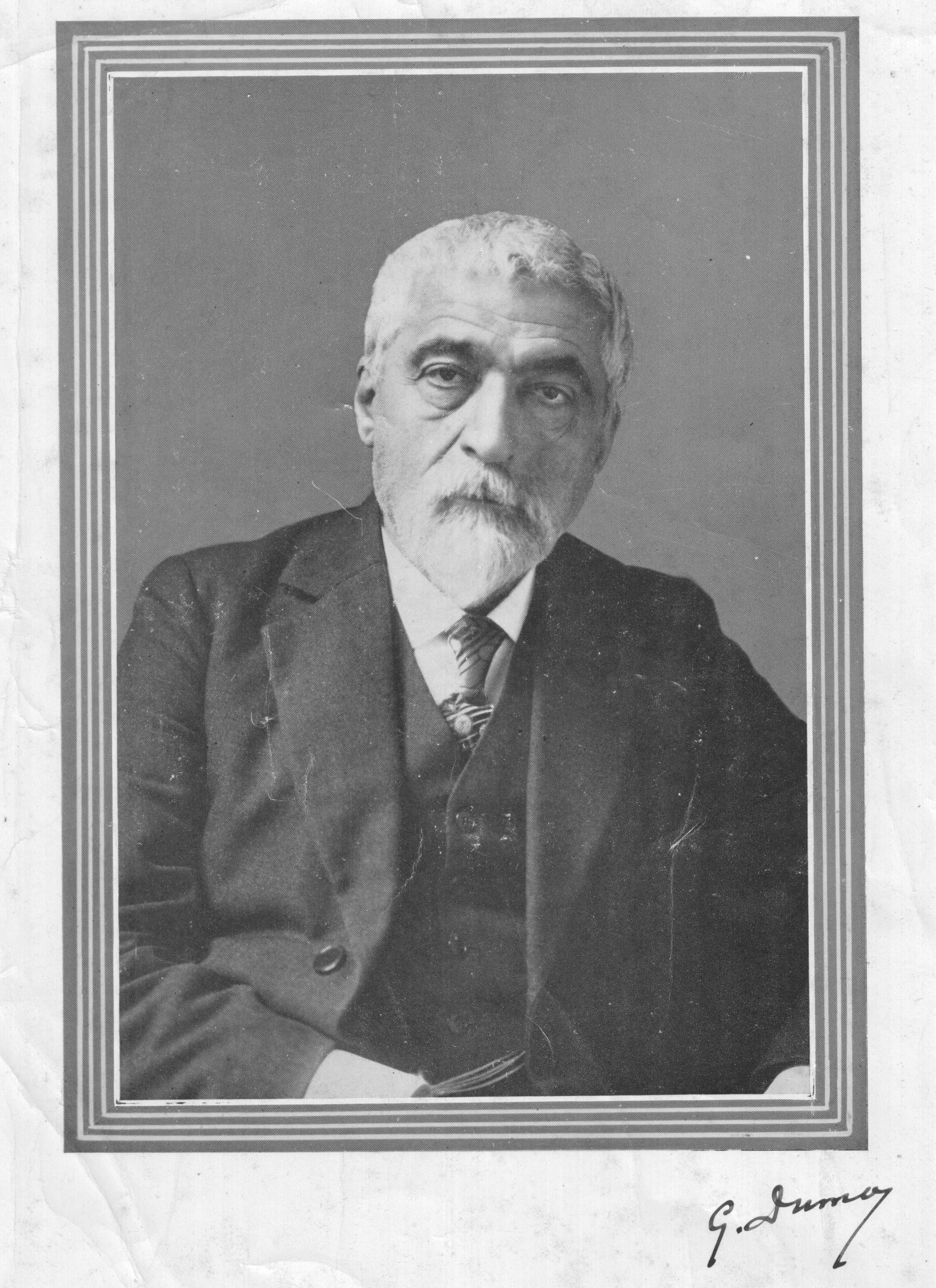
1940 photograph of Georges Dumas

Georges Dumas (French: [dymɑ]; 6 March 1866, Lédignan – 12 February 1946, Lédignan) was a French medical doctor and psychologist.

Dumas was a student of Théodule-Armand Ribot. His main work is The Treatise of Psychology (1923–1924, Le Traité de Psychologie). He wrote many articles for the work and oversaw its publication in two volumes. Many of the leading French psychologists of the time contributed to the work. A new completed edition (The New Treatise of Psychology, Le Nouveau traité de psychologie) was published between 1930 and 1949 in 10 volumes.

== Publications ==
- Léon Tolstoï et la philosophie de l’amour. Hachette, 1893
- Les États intellectuels dans la mélancolie. Alcan, 1894.
- Traduction avec préface de « Les Émotions » par Lange. Alcan, 1896.
- La Tristesse et la Joie. Thèse de doctorat ès lettres. Alcan, 1900.
- Auguste Comte, thèse latine, critique. Alcan, 1900.
- Préface de la traduction de La Théorie de l’émotion par William James. Alcan, 1902.
- Psychologie de deux messies positivistes : Auguste Comte and Saint-Simon. Alcan, 1905, Paris.
- Le Sourire et l’expression des émotions. Alcan, 1906.
- Névroses et psychoses de guerre chez les Austro-Allemands, in collaboration with Dr H. Aimé. Alcan, 1918.
- Troubles mentaux et troubles nerveux de guerre. Alcan, 1919
- Introduction à la psychologie. Son objet – Ses méthodes. Nouveau Traité de Psychologie. Tome I – Fascicule 4. Librairie Félix Alcan, 1936.
- Les Fonctions systématisées de la vie affective et de la vie active. Alcan 1939, Paris, 1939.
- Le Surnaturel et les Dieux d'après les Maladies Mentales. Essai de théogénie pathologique. P.U.F. 1946
- La Vie affective, Physiologie – Psychologie – Socialisation. 1948. P.U.F.
