= Brouzet-lès-Quissac =

Commune in Occitanie, France

- Commune
- Coat of arms
- Location of Brouzet-lès-Quissac
- Location within France Location within Occitanie
- Coordinates: 43°51′46″N 3°59′26″E
- Country: France
- Region: Occitania
- Department: Gard
- Arrondissement: Le Vigan
- Canton: Quissac

Government
  - Mayor (2020–2026): Laurent Gaubiac
- Area^{1}: 15.94 km^{2} (6.15 sq mi)
- Elevation: 85 m (279 ft)
- Highest elevation: 195 m (640 ft)
- Lowest elevation: 61 m (200 ft)
- Population (2023): 301
  - Density: 18.9/km^{2} (48.9/sq mi)
- Time zone: UTC+01:00 (CET)
  - Summer (DST): UTC+02:00 (CEST)
- INSEE/Postal code: 30054 /30260
- ^{1} French Land Register data, which excludes lakes, ponds, glaciers > 1 km^{2} (0.386 sq mi or 247 acres) and river estuaries.

Brouzet-lès-Quissac (French pronunciation: [bʁuzɛ lɛ kisak], literally Brouzet near Quissac; Occitan: Broset de Quiçac) is a commune in the Gard department in southern France.

== Population ==
Historical population
Year	Pop.	±% p.a.
1968	89	—
1975	93	+0.63%
1982	129	+4.79%
1990	155	+2.32%
1999	200	+2.87%
2007	235	+2.04%
2012	245	+0.84%
2017	291	+3.50%
2023	301	+0.56%
Source: INSEE

== See also ==
- Communes of the Gard department
