= 30350 =

30350 may refer to:

- 30350, a ZIP code for Sandy Springs, Georgia, United States
- 30350, a postal code for Aigremont, Gard, France
