= Tornac =

- Commune
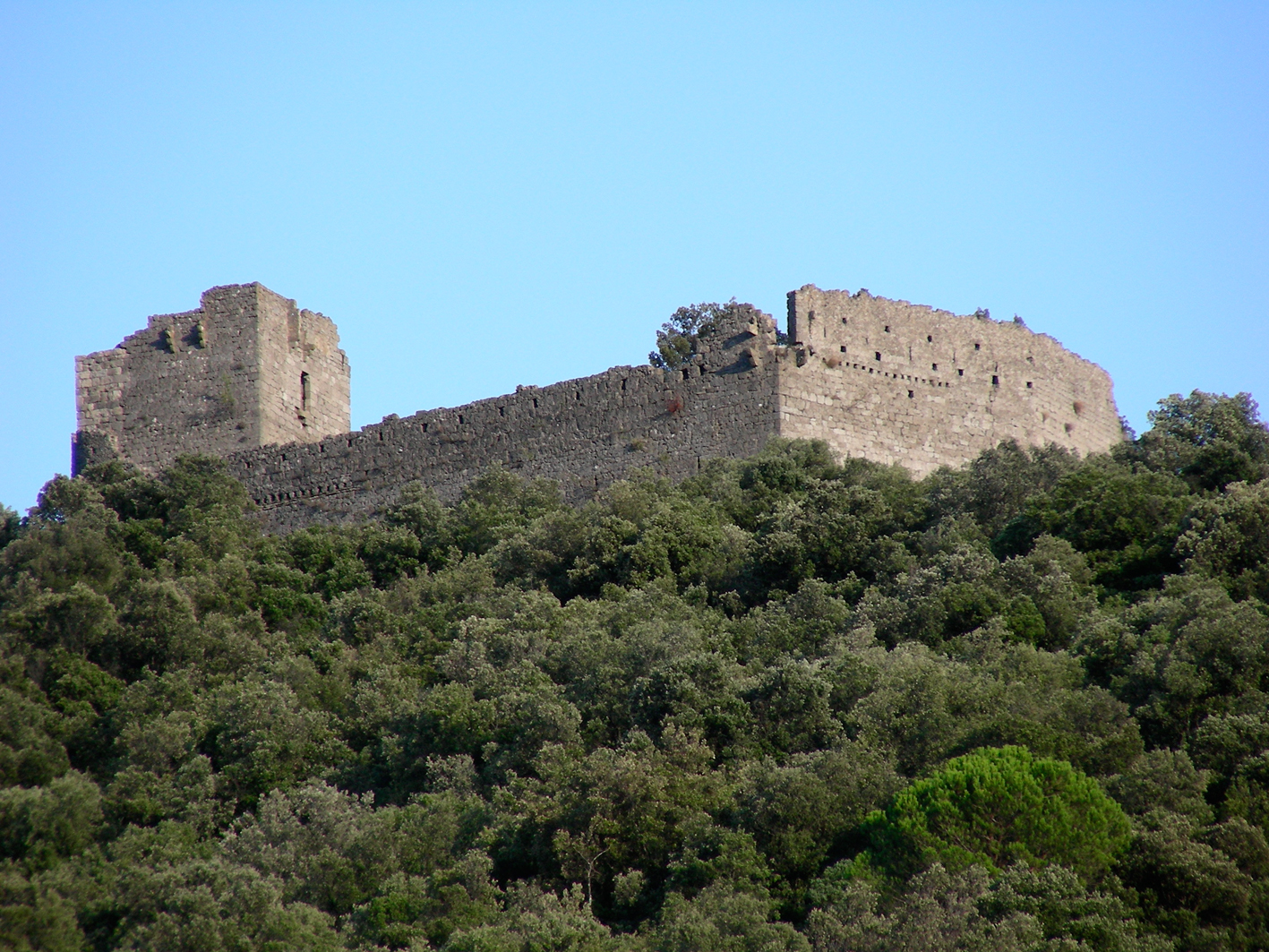
- The Château of Tornac

- Coat of arms
- Location of Tornac
- Location within France Location within Occitanie
- Coordinates: 44°01′25″N 3°59′50″E
- Country: France
- Region: Occitania
- Department: Gard
- Arrondissement: Alès
- Canton: Quissac
- Intercommunality: Alès Agglomération

Government
  - Mayor (2020–2026): Marielle Vigne
- Area^{1}: 19.68 km^{2} (7.60 sq mi)
- Elevation: 125 m (410 ft)
- Highest elevation: 421 m (1,381 ft)
- Lowest elevation: 117 m (384 ft)
- Population (2023): 945
  - Density: 48.0/km^{2} (124/sq mi)
- Time zone: UTC+01:00 (CET)
  - Summer (DST): UTC+02:00 (CEST)
- INSEE/Postal code: 30330 /30140
- ^{1} French Land Register data, which excludes lakes, ponds, glaciers > 1 km^{2} (0.386 sq mi or 247 acres) and river estuaries.

Tornac (French pronunciation: [tɔʁnak]) is a commune in the Gard department in southern France.

== Population ==
Historical population
Year	Pop.	±% p.a.
1968	534	—
1975	575	+1.06%
1982	634	+1.41%
1990	650	+0.31%
1999	718	+1.11%
2007	862	+2.31%
2012	877	+0.35%
2017	904	+0.61%
2023	945	+0.74%
Source: INSEE

== See also ==
- Communes of the Gard department
