= Gailhan =

- Commune
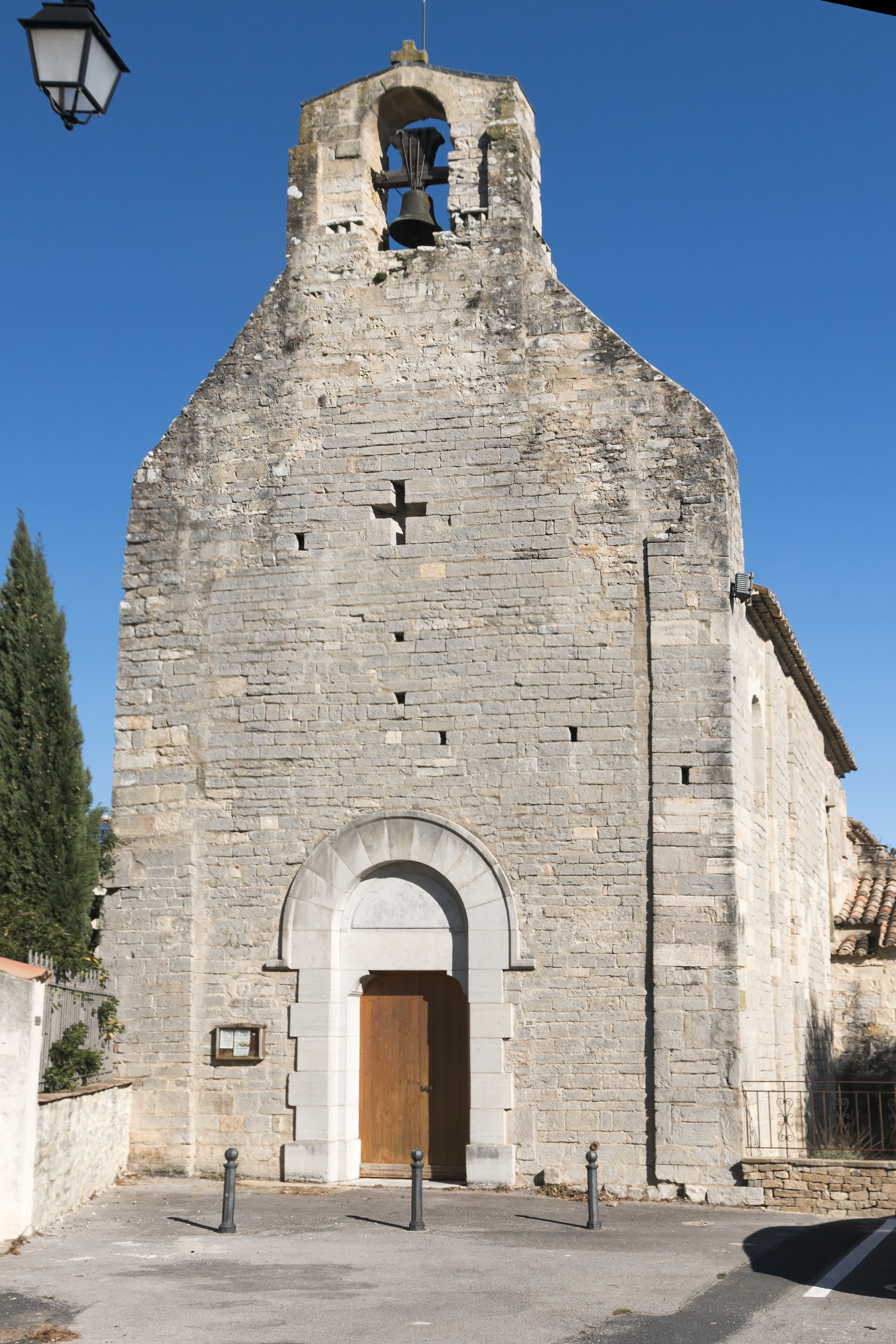
- St. Privat Church

- Coat of arms
- Location of Gailhan
- Location within France Location within Occitanie
- Coordinates: 43°50′41″N 4°01′57″E
- Country: France
- Region: Occitania
- Department: Gard
- Arrondissement: Le Vigan
- Canton: Quissac

Government
  - Mayor (2020–2026): Jacky Sipeire
- Area^{1}: 5.53 km^{2} (2.14 sq mi)
- Elevation: 60 m (200 ft)
- Highest elevation: 211 m (692 ft)
- Lowest elevation: 39 m (128 ft)
- Population (2023): 313
  - Density: 56.6/km^{2} (147/sq mi)
- Time zone: UTC+01:00 (CET)
  - Summer (DST): UTC+02:00 (CEST)
- INSEE/Postal code: 30121 /30260
- ^{1} French Land Register data, which excludes lakes, ponds, glaciers > 1 km^{2} (0.386 sq mi or 247 acres) and river estuaries.

Gailhan (French pronunciation: [ɡajɑ̃]; Occitan: Galhan) is a commune in the Gard department in southern France.

== Population ==
Historical population
Year	Pop.	±% p.a.
1968	113	—
1975	110	−0.38%
1982	116	+0.76%
1990	111	−0.55%
1999	128	+1.60%
2007	173	+3.84%
2012	214	+4.35%
2017	246	+2.83%
2023	313	+4.10%
Source: INSEE

== See also ==
- Communes of the Gard department
