= Fressac =

- Commune
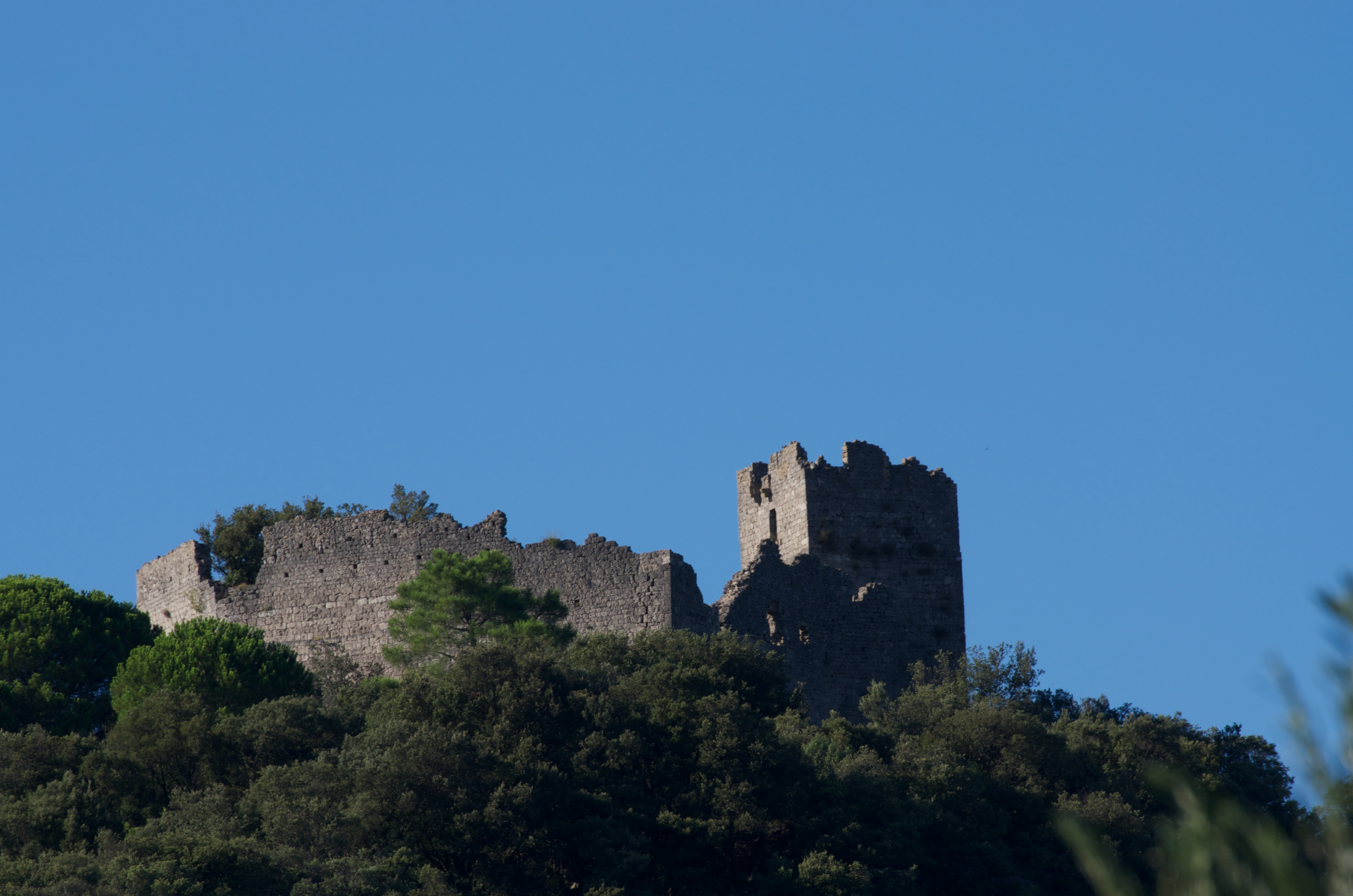
- The château of Fressac

- Coat of arms
- Location of Fressac
- Location within France Location within Occitanie
- Coordinates: 43°59′51″N 3°55′36″E
- Country: France
- Region: Occitania
- Department: Gard
- Arrondissement: Le Vigan
- Canton: Quissac

Government
  - Mayor (2020–2026): Laurent Martin
- Area^{1}: 5.89 km^{2} (2.27 sq mi)
- Elevation: 200 m (660 ft)
- Highest elevation: 348 m (1,142 ft)
- Lowest elevation: 184 m (604 ft)
- Population (2023): 163
  - Density: 27.7/km^{2} (71.7/sq mi)
- Time zone: UTC+01:00 (CET)
  - Summer (DST): UTC+02:00 (CEST)
- INSEE/Postal code: 30119 /30170
- ^{1} French Land Register data, which excludes lakes, ponds, glaciers > 1 km^{2} (0.386 sq mi or 247 acres) and river estuaries.

Fressac (French pronunciation: [fʁɛsak]) is a commune in the Gard department in southern France.

== Population ==
Historical population
Year	Pop.	±% p.a.
1968	58	—
1975	75	+3.74%
1982	71	−0.78%
1990	81	+1.66%
1999	87	+0.80%
2007	121	+4.21%
2012	183	+8.63%
2017	162	−2.41%
2023	163	+0.10%
Source: INSEE

== See also ==
- Communes of the Gard department
