= Saint-Théodorit =

- Commune
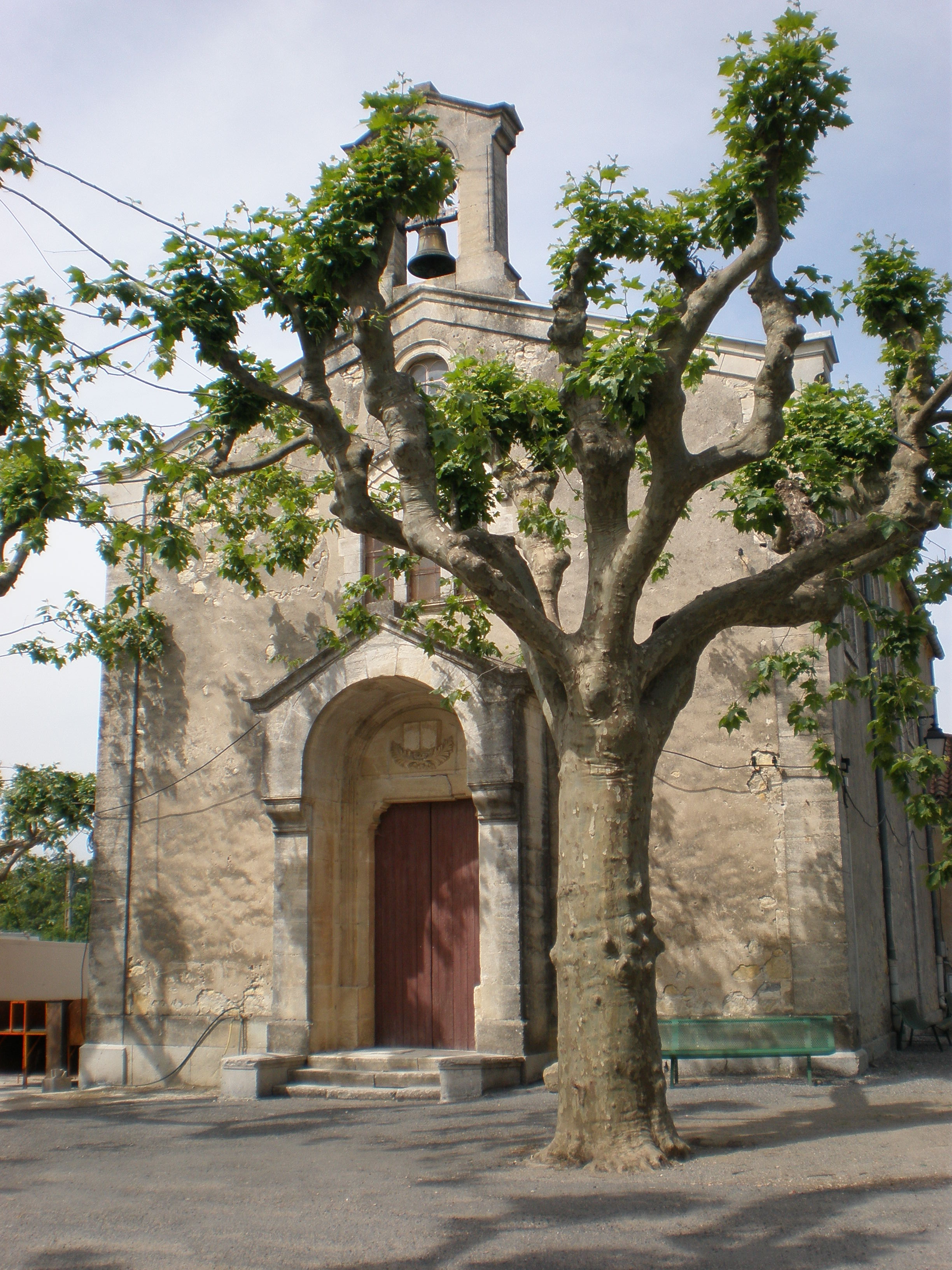
- The church in Saint-Théodorit

- Coat of arms
- Location of Saint-Théodorit
- Location within France Location within Occitanie
- Coordinates: 43°56′32″N 4°05′00″E
- Country: France
- Region: Occitania
- Department: Gard
- Arrondissement: Le Vigan
- Canton: Quissac

Government
  - Mayor (2020–2026): Cyril Soulier
- Area^{1}: 8.75 km^{2} (3.38 sq mi)
- Elevation: 140 m (460 ft)
- Highest elevation: 227 m (745 ft)
- Lowest elevation: 80 m (260 ft)
- Population (2023): 553
  - Density: 63.2/km^{2} (164/sq mi)
- Time zone: UTC+01:00 (CET)
  - Summer (DST): UTC+02:00 (CEST)
- INSEE/Postal code: 30300 /30260
- ^{1} French Land Register data, which excludes lakes, ponds, glaciers > 1 km^{2} (0.386 sq mi or 247 acres) and river estuaries.

Saint-Théodorit (French pronunciation: [sɛ̃ teɔdɔʁi]; Occitan: Sent Teodorit) is a commune in the Gard department in southern France.

== Population ==
Historical population
Year	Pop.	±% p.a.
1968	186	—
1975	180	−0.47%
1982	216	+2.64%
1990	231	+0.84%
1999	258	+1.24%
2007	408	+5.90%
2012	490	+3.73%
2017	532	+1.66%
2023	553	+0.65%
Source: INSEE

== See also ==
- Communes of the Gard department
