= Canaules-et-Argentières =

Commune in Occitanie, France

- Commune
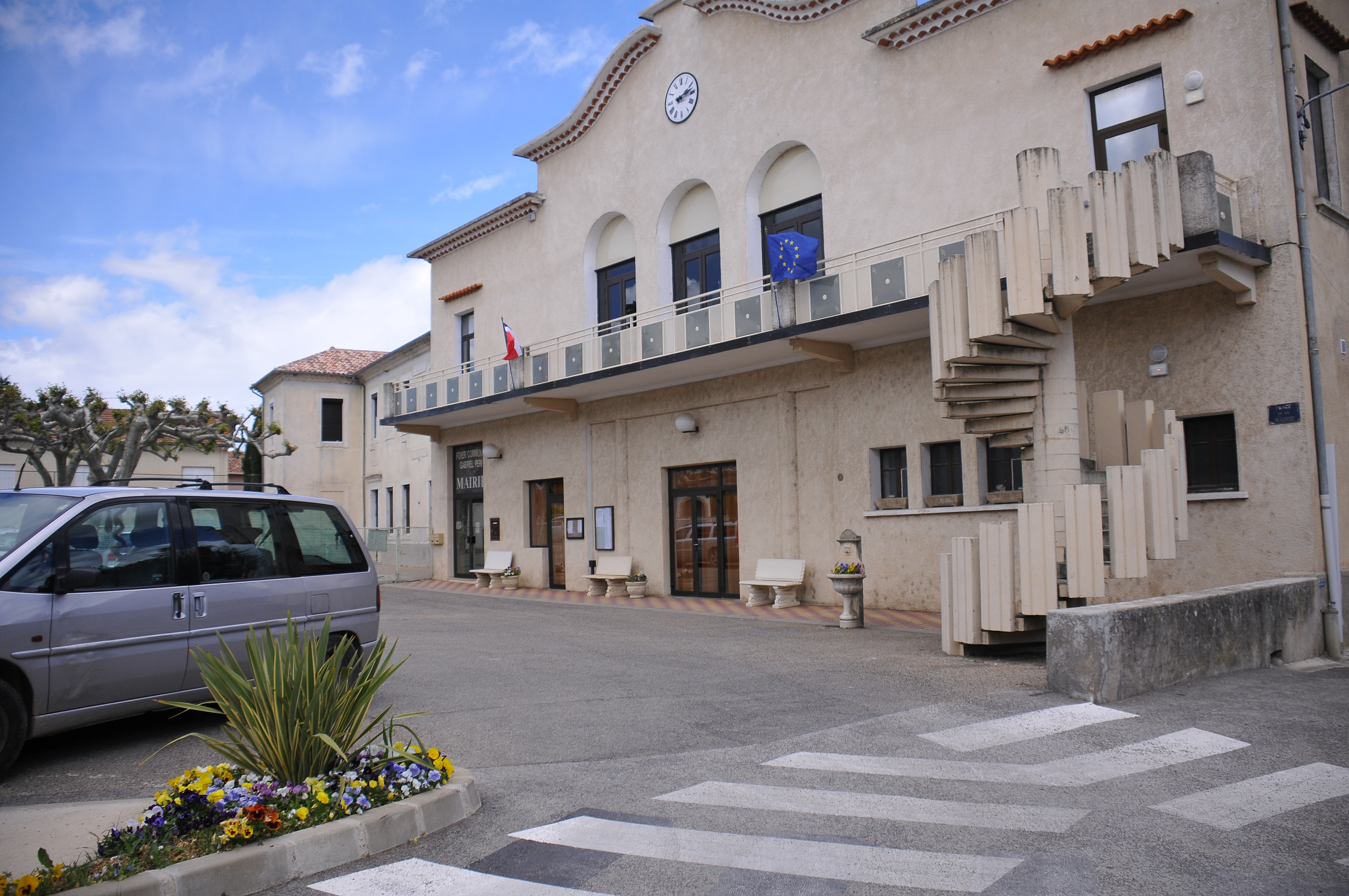
- Town hall

- Coat of arms
- Location of Canaules-et-Argentières
- Location within France Location within Occitanie
- Coordinates: 43°58′54″N 4°03′11″E
- Country: France
- Region: Occitania
- Department: Gard
- Arrondissement: Le Vigan
- Canton: Quissac

Government
  - Mayor (2020–2026): Robert Cahu
- Area^{1}: 10.06 km^{2} (3.88 sq mi)
- Elevation: 112 m (367 ft)
- Highest elevation: 168 m (551 ft)
- Lowest elevation: 88 m (289 ft)
- Population (2023): 475
  - Density: 47.2/km^{2} (122/sq mi)
- Time zone: UTC+01:00 (CET)
  - Summer (DST): UTC+02:00 (CEST)
- INSEE/Postal code: 30065 /30350
- ^{1} French Land Register data, which excludes lakes, ponds, glaciers > 1 km^{2} (0.386 sq mi or 247 acres) and river estuaries.

Canaules-et-Argentières (French pronunciation: [kanol‿e aʁʒɑ̃tjɛʁ]; Occitan: Canaulas e l'Argentièira) is a commune in the Gard department in southern France. It is located deep in the French wine-producing region of Languedoc.

== Population ==
Historical population
Year	Pop.	±% p.a.
1968	395	—
1975	352	−1.63%
1982	345	−0.29%
1990	353	+0.29%
1999	342	−0.35%
2007	433	+2.99%
2012	362	−3.52%
2017	434	+3.69%
2023	475	+1.52%
Source: INSEE

== See also ==
- Communes of the Gard department
