= Cros, Gard =

Cros
- Commune
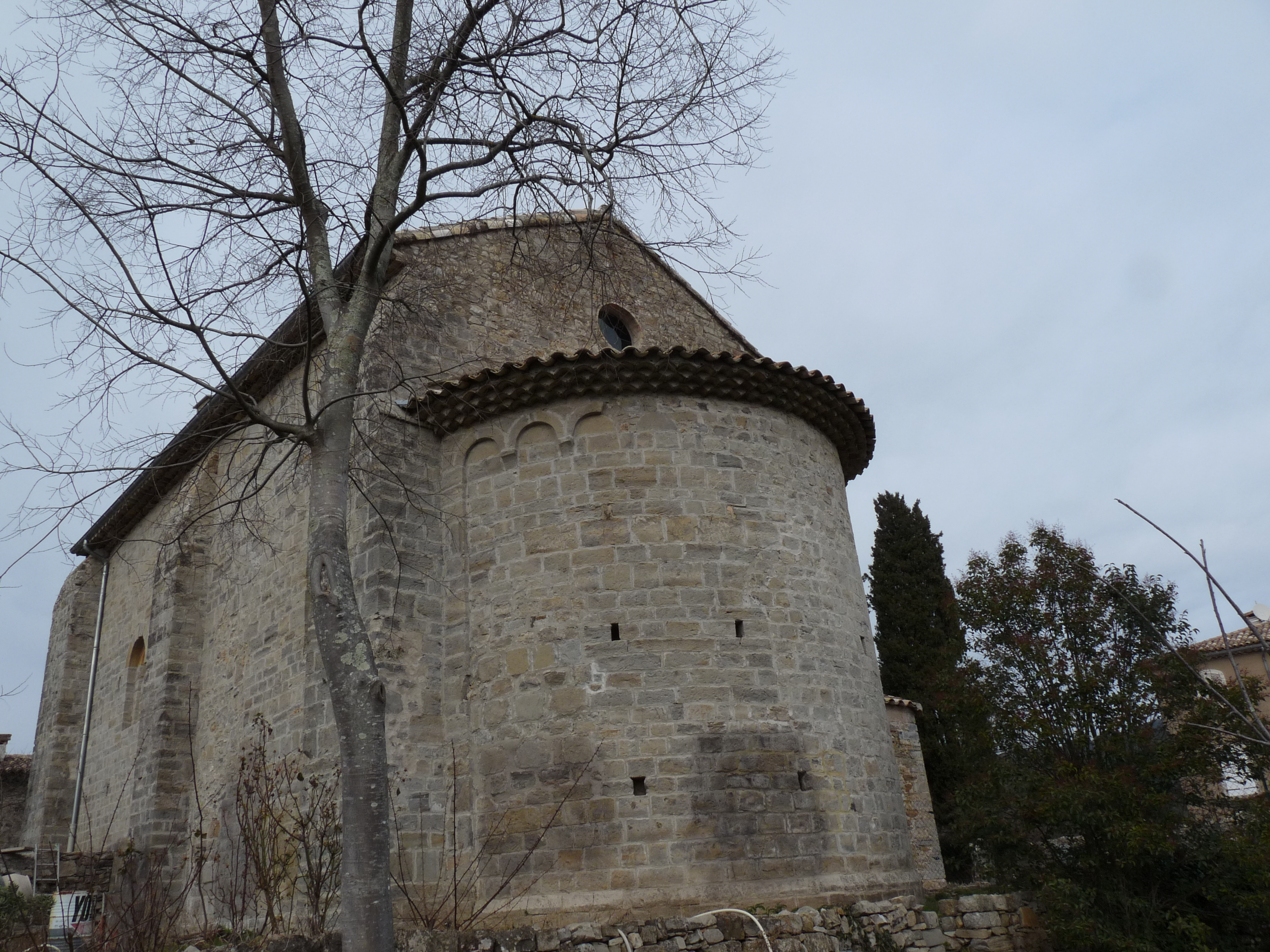
- The church of Cros

- Coat of arms
- Location of Cros
- Location within France Location within Occitanie
- Coordinates: 43°59′38″N 3°49′33″E
- Country: France
- Region: Occitania
- Department: Gard
- Arrondissement: Le Vigan
- Canton: Quissac
- Intercommunality: Piémont Cévenol

Government
  - Mayor (2020–2026): Christian Clavel
- Area^{1}: 16.94 km^{2} (6.54 sq mi)
- Elevation: 235 m (771 ft)
- Highest elevation: 964 m (3,163 ft)
- Lowest elevation: 178 m (584 ft)
- Population (2023): 265
  - Density: 15.6/km^{2} (40.5/sq mi)
- Time zone: UTC+01:00 (CET)
  - Summer (DST): UTC+02:00 (CEST)
- INSEE/Postal code: 30099 /30170
- ^{1} French Land Register data, which excludes lakes, ponds, glaciers > 1 km^{2} (0.386 sq mi or 247 acres) and river estuaries.

Cros (pronounced cross, not crow) is a commune in the Gard department in southern France.

== Population ==
Historical population
Year	Pop.	±% p.a.
1968	249	—
1975	229	−1.19%
1982	230	+0.06%
1990	234	+0.22%
1999	213	−1.04%
2007	250	+2.02%
2012	252	+0.16%
2017	249	−0.24%
2023	265	+1.04%
Source: INSEE

== See also ==
- Communes of the Gard department
