= Liouc =

- Commune
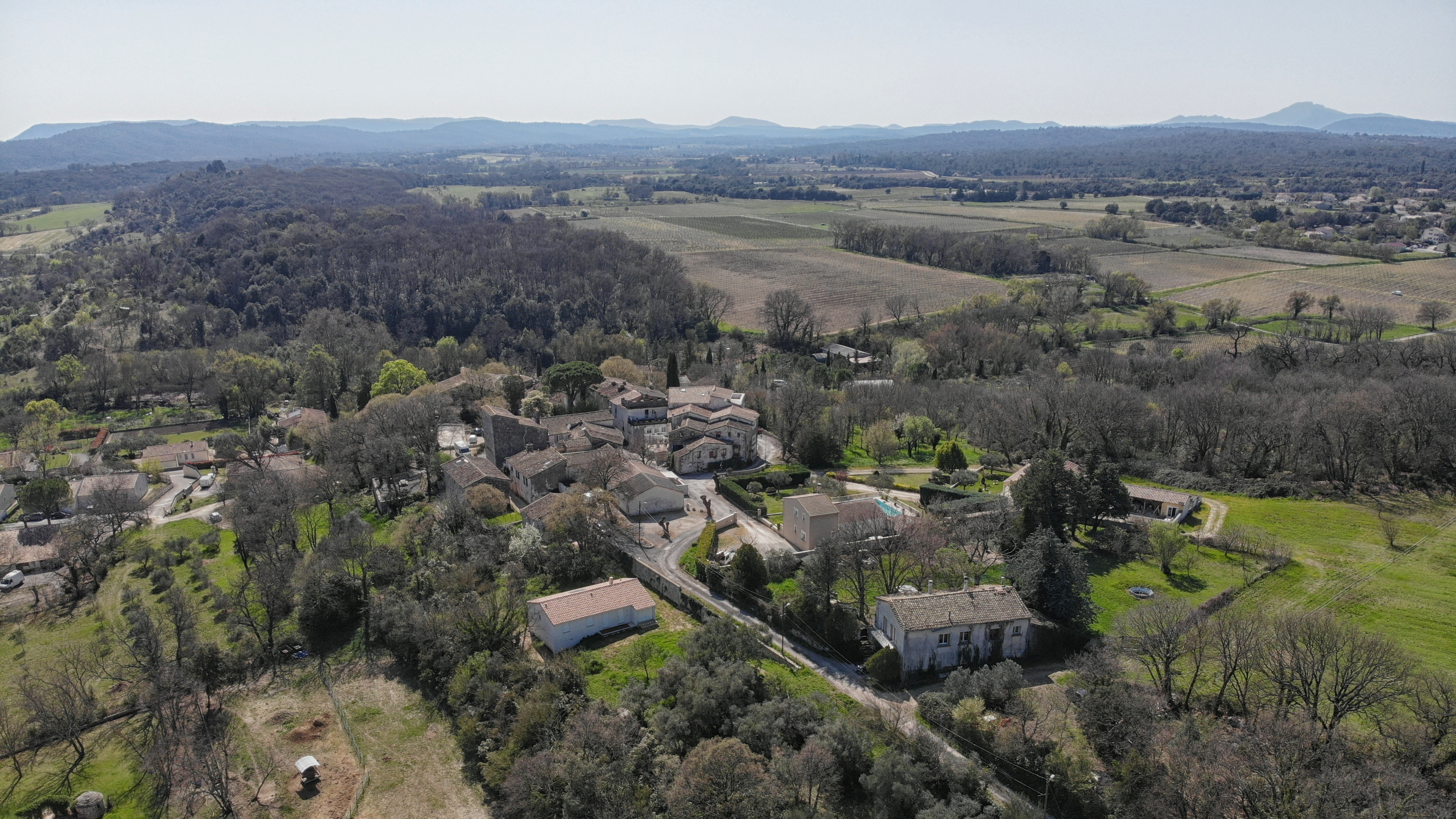
- Aerial view of Liouc

- Coat of arms
- Location of Liouc
- Location within France Location within Occitanie
- Coordinates: 43°53′42″N 3°59′59″E
- Country: France
- Region: Occitania
- Department: Gard
- Arrondissement: Le Vigan
- Canton: Quissac

Government
  - Mayor (2020–2026): Guy Jahant
- Area^{1}: 9.64 km^{2} (3.72 sq mi)
- Elevation: 115 m (377 ft)
- Highest elevation: 443 m (1,453 ft)
- Lowest elevation: 65 m (213 ft)
- Population (2023): 330
  - Density: 34/km^{2} (89/sq mi)
- Time zone: UTC+01:00 (CET)
  - Summer (DST): UTC+02:00 (CEST)
- INSEE/Postal code: 30148 /30260
- ^{1} French Land Register data, which excludes lakes, ponds, glaciers > 1 km^{2} (0.386 sq mi or 247 acres) and river estuaries.

Liouc (French pronunciation: [ljuk]; Occitan: Lièuc) is a commune in the Gard department in southern France.

== Population ==
Historical population
Year	Pop.	±% p.a.
1968	51	—
1975	56	+1.35%
1982	87	+6.50%
1990	95	+1.11%
1999	121	+2.72%
2007	182	+5.24%
2012	256	+7.06%
2017	281	+1.88%
2023	330	+2.72%
Source: INSEE

== See also ==
- Communes of the Gard department
