= Vic-le-Fesq =

- Commune
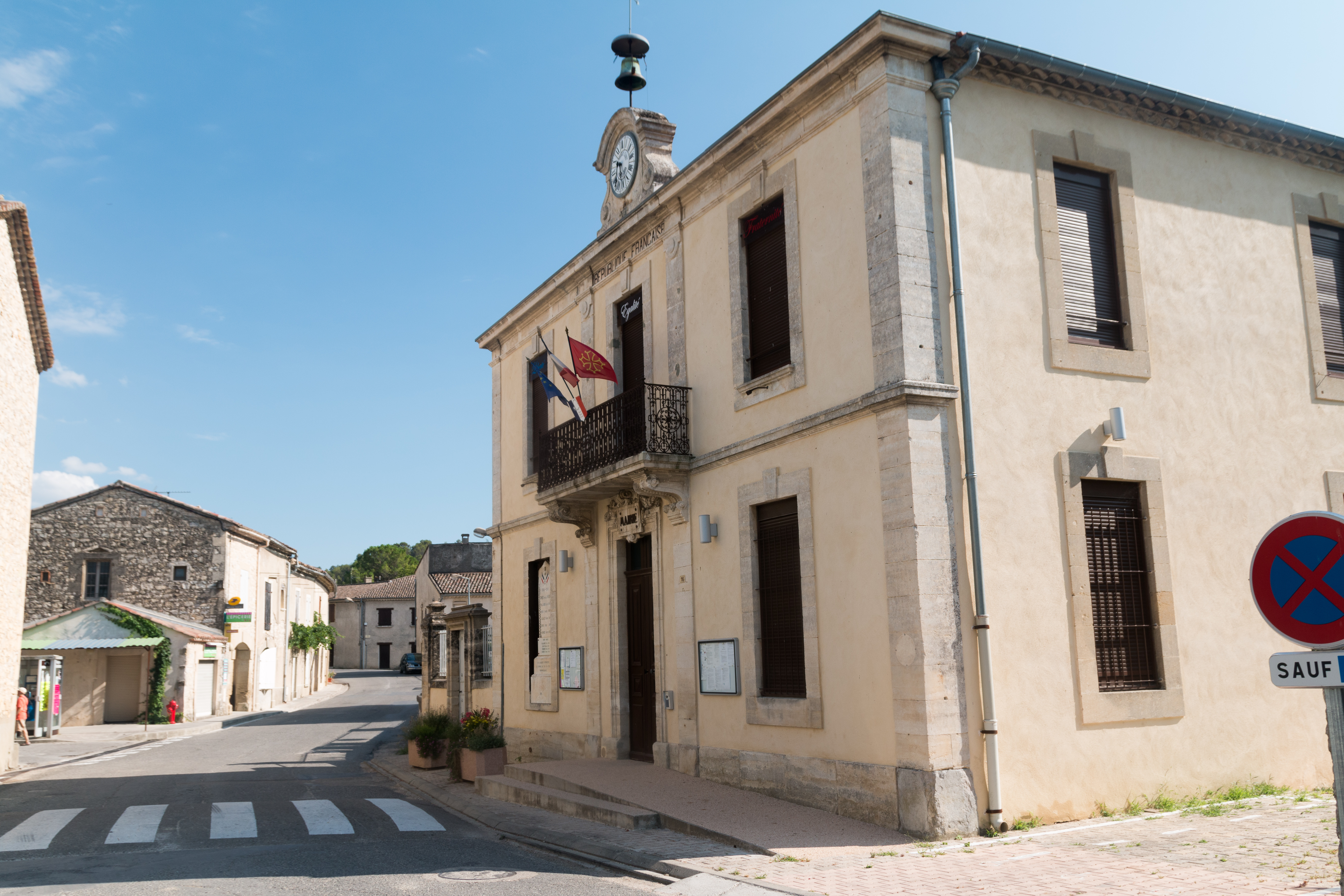
- The town hall of Vic-le-Fesq

- Coat of arms
- Location of Vic-le-Fesq
- Location within France Location within Occitanie
- Coordinates: 43°52′12″N 4°04′59″E
- Country: France
- Region: Occitania
- Department: Gard
- Arrondissement: Le Vigan
- Canton: Quissac
- Intercommunality: Piémont Cévenol

Government
  - Mayor (2020–2026): José Monel
- Area^{1}: 9.63 km^{2} (3.72 sq mi)
- Elevation: 58 m (190 ft)
- Highest elevation: 163 m (535 ft)
- Lowest elevation: 35 m (115 ft)
- Population (2023): 592
  - Density: 61.5/km^{2} (159/sq mi)
- Time zone: UTC+01:00 (CET)
  - Summer (DST): UTC+02:00 (CEST)
- INSEE/Postal code: 30349 /30260
- ^{1} French Land Register data, which excludes lakes, ponds, glaciers > 1 km^{2} (0.386 sq mi or 247 acres) and river estuaries.

Vic-le-Fesq (French pronunciation: [vik lə fɛsk]; Occitan: Vic e lo Fesc) is a commune in the Gard department in southern France.

== Geography ==
=== Climate ===
Vic-le-Fesq has a hot-summer Mediterranean climate (Köppen climate classification Csa). The average annual temperature in Vic-le-Fesq is 14.2 °C (57.6 °F). The average annual rainfall is 844.7 mm (33.26 in) with September as the wettest month. The temperatures are highest on average in July, at around 23.4 °C (74.1 °F), and lowest in January, at around 6.2 °C (43.2 °F). The highest temperature ever recorded in Vic-le-Fesq was 43.3 °C (109.9 °F) on 28 June 2019; the coldest temperature ever recorded was −16.0 °C (3.2 °F) on 15 January 1985.

Climate data for Vic-le-Fesq (1991−2020 normals, extremes 1966−present)
Month	Jan	Feb	Mar	Apr	May	Jun	Jul	Aug	Sep	Oct	Nov	Dec	Year
Record high °C (°F)	22.2 (72.0)	24.4 (75.9)	28.5 (83.3)	31.7 (89.1)	34.3 (93.7)	43.3 (109.9)	39.9 (103.8)	40.8 (105.4)	36.1 (97.0)	32.7 (90.9)	26.4 (79.5)	21.0 (69.8)	43.3 (109.9)
Mean daily maximum °C (°F)	11.8 (53.2)	13.3 (55.9)	17.0 (62.6)	19.6 (67.3)	23.8 (74.8)	28.5 (83.3)	31.5 (88.7)	31.1 (88.0)	26.2 (79.2)	20.9 (69.6)	15.5 (59.9)	12.2 (54.0)	20.9 (69.6)
Daily mean °C (°F)	6.2 (43.2)	6.8 (44.2)	10.0 (50.0)	12.8 (55.0)	16.7 (62.1)	20.8 (69.4)	23.4 (74.1)	23.2 (73.8)	18.9 (66.0)	15.0 (59.0)	10.1 (50.2)	6.8 (44.2)	14.2 (57.6)
Mean daily minimum °C (°F)	0.5 (32.9)	0.3 (32.5)	3.0 (37.4)	5.9 (42.6)	9.6 (49.3)	13.1 (55.6)	15.3 (59.5)	15.2 (59.4)	11.6 (52.9)	9.2 (48.6)	4.6 (40.3)	1.3 (34.3)	7.5 (45.5)
Record low °C (°F)	−16.0 (3.2)	−12.1 (10.2)	−12.1 (10.2)	−4.9 (23.2)	−2.0 (28.4)	2.5 (36.5)	5.5 (41.9)	4.4 (39.9)	0.0 (32.0)	−4.2 (24.4)	−9.3 (15.3)	−10.4 (13.3)	−16.0 (3.2)
Average precipitation mm (inches)	67.5 (2.66)	47.1 (1.85)	52.7 (2.07)	71.5 (2.81)	61.7 (2.43)	48.3 (1.90)	27.1 (1.07)	46.6 (1.83)	126.6 (4.98)	116.5 (4.59)	108.9 (4.29)	70.2 (2.76)	844.7 (33.26)
Average precipitation days (≥ 1.0 mm)	6.6	4.9	5.1	6.8	6.4	5.0	3.2	4.6	5.5	7.2	7.8	6.3	69.5
Source: Météo-France

== Population ==
Historical population
Year	Pop.	±% p.a.
1968	199	—
1975	231	+2.15%
1982	209	−1.42%
1990	250	+2.26%
1999	295	+1.86%
2007	351	+2.20%
2012	426	+3.95%
2017	522	+4.15%
2023	592	+2.12%
Source: INSEE

== See also ==
- Communes of the Gard department
