= Canton of Quissac =

Coordinates: 43.91°N 4.00°E

The canton of Quissac is an administrative division of the Gard department, southern France. Its borders were modified at the French canton reorganisation which came into effect in March 2015. Its seat is in Quissac.

It consists of the following communes:

- Aigremont
- Boucoiran-et-Nozières
- Bragassargues
- Brignon
- Brouzet-lès-Quissac
- Canaules-et-Argentières
- Cardet
- Carnas
- Cassagnoles
- Colognac
- Corconne
- Cros
- Cruviers-Lascours
- Domessargues
- Durfort-et-Saint-Martin-de-Sossenac
- Fressac
- Gailhan
- Lédignan
- Lézan
- Liouc
- Logrian-Florian
- Maruéjols-lès-Gardon
- Massanes
- Massillargues-Attuech
- Mauressargues
- Monoblet
- Montagnac
- Moulézan
- Moussac
- Ners
- Orthoux-Sérignac-Quilhan
- Puechredon
- Quissac
- Saint-Bénézet
- Saint-Félix-de-Pallières
- Saint-Jean-de-Crieulon
- Saint-Jean-de-Serres
- Saint-Nazaire-des-Gardies
- Saint-Théodorit
- Sardan
- Sauve
- Savignargues
- Tornac
- Vic-le-Fesq
