= Orthoux-Sérignac-Quilhan =

- Commune
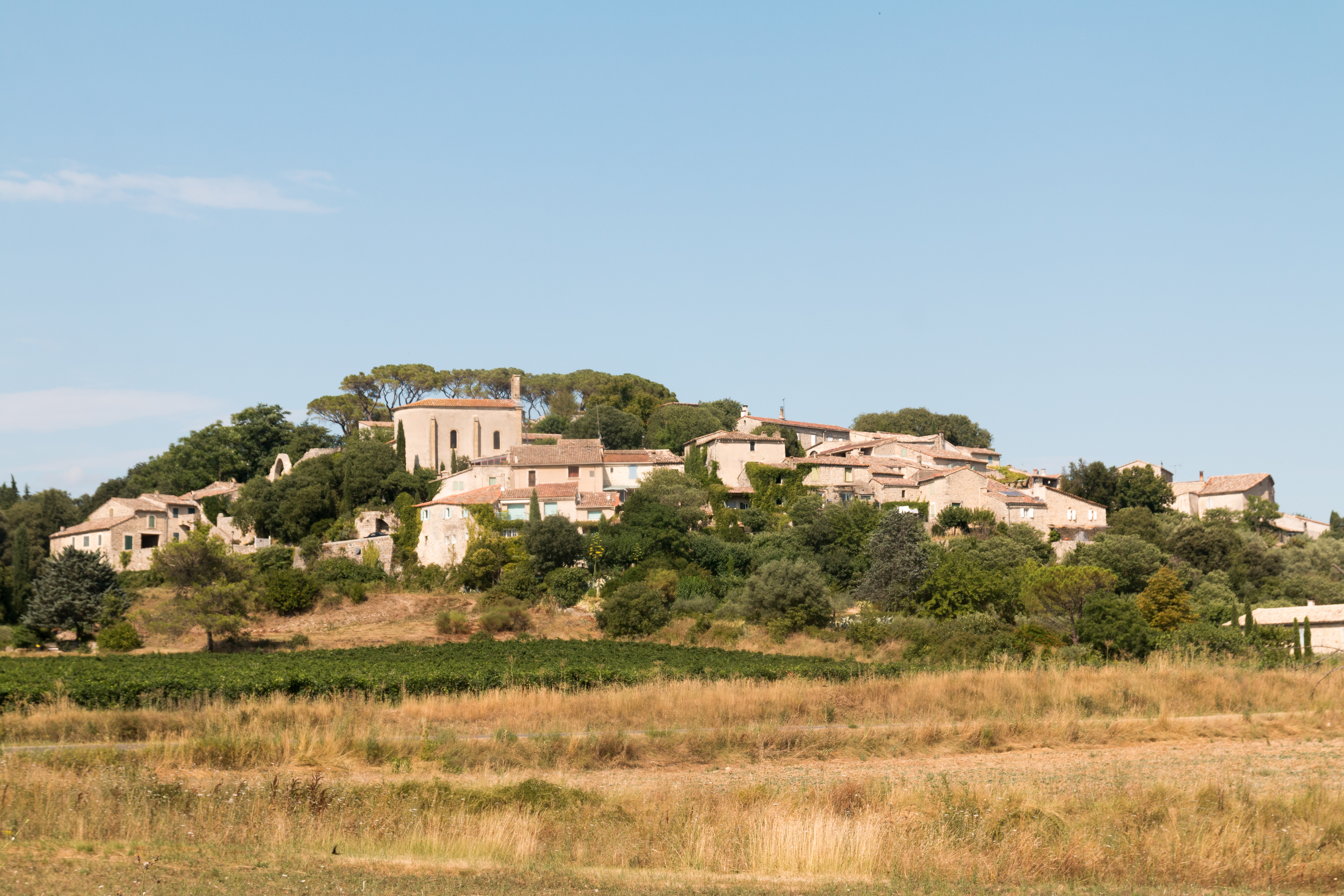
- A general view of Sérignac

- Coat of arms
- Location of Orthoux-Sérignac-Quilhan
- Location within France Location within Occitanie
- Coordinates: 43°53′34″N 4°03′27″E
- Country: France
- Region: Occitania
- Department: Gard
- Arrondissement: Le Vigan
- Canton: Quissac
- Intercommunality: Piémont Cévenol

Government
  - Mayor (2020–2026): Jean-Michel Roque
- Area^{1}: 13.98 km^{2} (5.40 sq mi)
- Elevation: 125 m (410 ft)
- Highest elevation: 206 m (676 ft)
- Lowest elevation: 44 m (144 ft)
- Population (2023): 440
  - Density: 31/km^{2} (82/sq mi)
- Time zone: UTC+01:00 (CET)
  - Summer (DST): UTC+02:00 (CEST)
- INSEE/Postal code: 30192 /30260
- ^{1} French Land Register data, which excludes lakes, ponds, glaciers > 1 km^{2} (0.386 sq mi or 247 acres) and river estuaries.

Orthoux-Sérignac-Quilhan (French pronunciation: [ɔʁtu seʁiɲak kijɑ̃]; Occitan: Ortons, Serinhan e Quilhan) is a commune in the Gard department in southern France.

== Population ==
Historical population
Year	Pop.	±% p.a.
1968	171	—
1975	179	+0.66%
1982	165	−1.16%
1990	272	+6.45%
1999	290	+0.71%
2007	384	+3.57%
2012	404	+1.02%
2017	416	+0.59%
2023	440	+0.94%
Source: INSEE

== See also ==
- Communes of the Gard department
