= Sardan =

- Commune
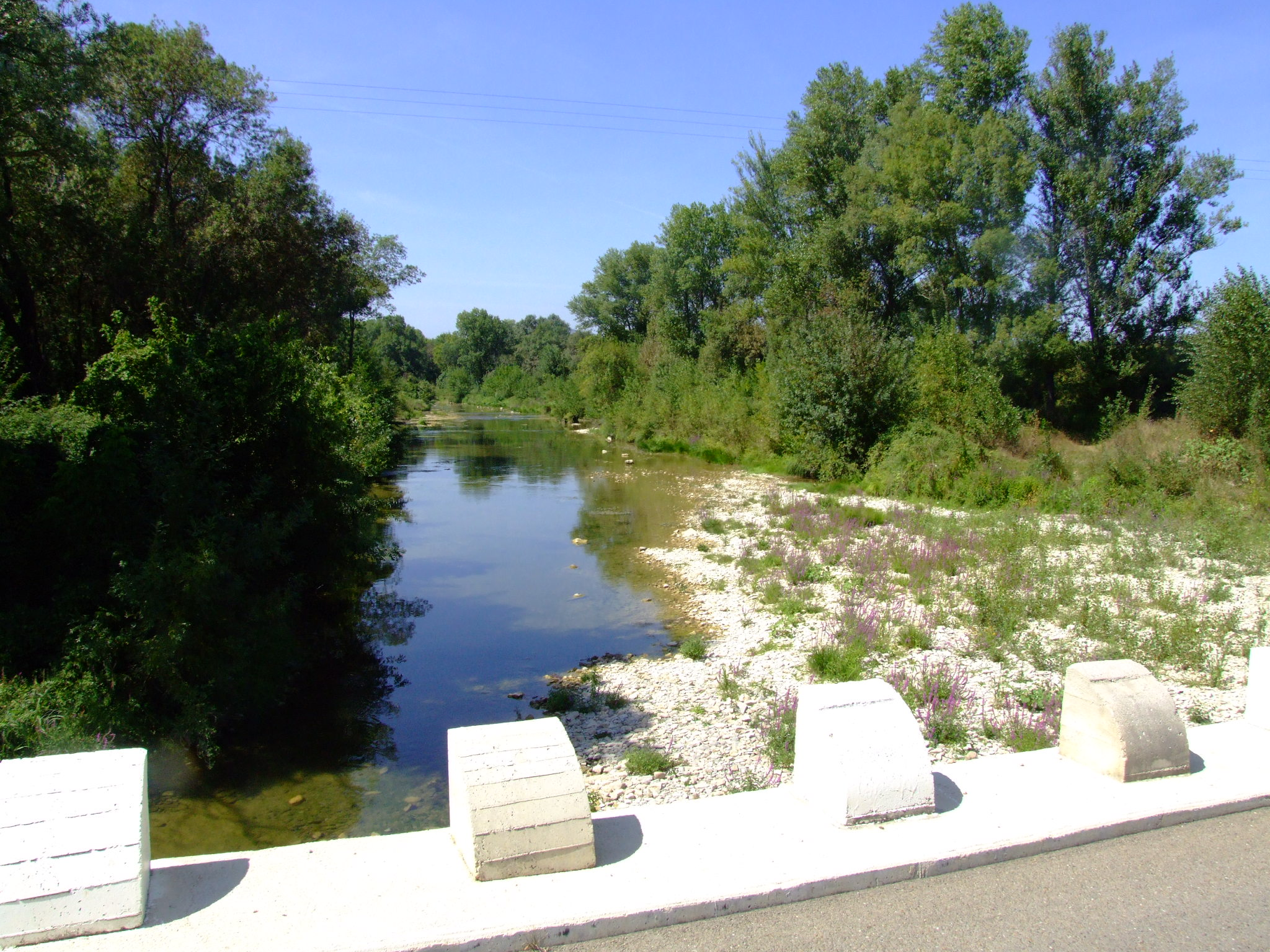
- The Vidourle river in Sardan

- Coat of arms
- Location of Sardan
- Location within France Location within Occitanie
- Coordinates: 43°52′27″N 4°02′31″E
- Country: France
- Region: Occitania
- Department: Gard
- Arrondissement: Le Vigan
- Canton: Quissac

Government
  - Mayor (2020–2026): Gabrielle Tarnowski
- Area^{1}: 6.24 km^{2} (2.41 sq mi)
- Elevation: 70 m (230 ft)
- Highest elevation: 210 m (690 ft)
- Lowest elevation: 48 m (157 ft)
- Population (2023): 347
  - Density: 55.6/km^{2} (144/sq mi)
- Time zone: UTC+01:00 (CET)
  - Summer (DST): UTC+02:00 (CEST)
- INSEE/Postal code: 30309 /30260
- ^{1} French Land Register data, which excludes lakes, ponds, glaciers > 1 km^{2} (0.386 sq mi or 247 acres) and river estuaries.

Sardan (French pronunciation: [saʁdɑ̃]) is a commune in the Gard department in southern France.

== Population ==
Historical population
Year	Pop.	±% p.a.
1968	112	—
1975	99	−1.75%
1982	135	+4.53%
1990	175	+3.30%
1999	239	+3.52%
2007	260	+1.06%
2012	280	+1.49%
2017	300	+1.39%
2023	347	+2.46%
Source: INSEE

== See also ==
- Communes of the Gard department
