= Lézan =

- Commune
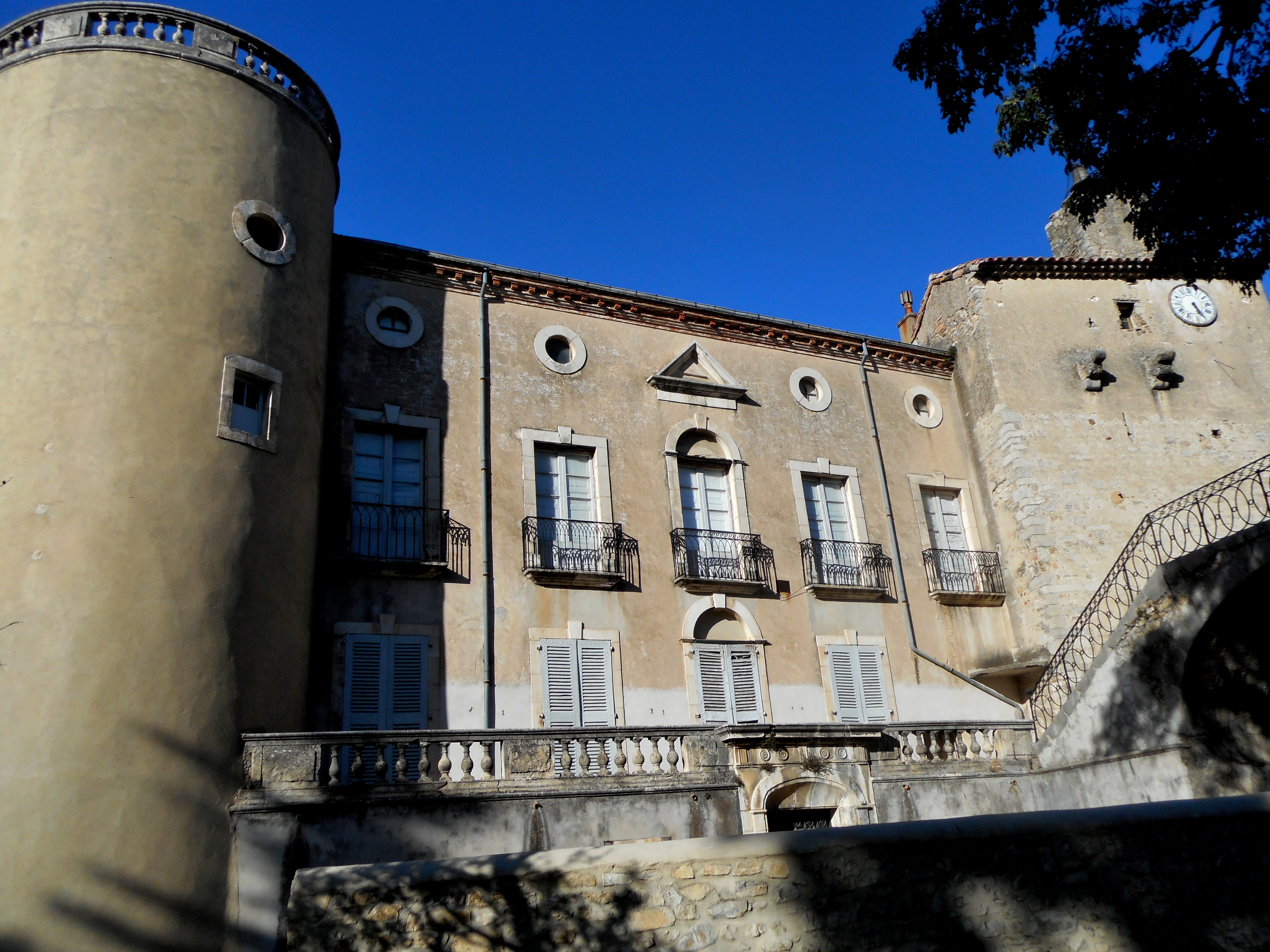
- The Château of Lézan

- Coat of arms
- Location of Lézan
- Location within France Location within Occitanie
- Coordinates: 44°00′50″N 4°03′05″E
- Country: France
- Region: Occitania
- Department: Gard
- Arrondissement: Alès
- Canton: Quissac
- Intercommunality: Alès Agglomération

Government
  - Mayor (2020–2026): Eric Torreilles
- Area^{1}: 9.54 km^{2} (3.68 sq mi)
- Elevation: 120 m (390 ft)
- Highest elevation: 180 m (590 ft)
- Lowest elevation: 104 m (341 ft)
- Population (2023): 1,561
  - Density: 164/km^{2} (424/sq mi)
- Time zone: UTC+01:00 (CET)
  - Summer (DST): UTC+02:00 (CEST)
- INSEE/Postal code: 30147 /30350
- ^{1} French Land Register data, which excludes lakes, ponds, glaciers > 1 km^{2} (0.386 sq mi or 247 acres) and river estuaries.

Lézan (French pronunciation: [lezɑ̃]; Occitan: Lesan) is a commune in the Gard department in southern France.

== Population ==
Historical population
Year	Pop.	±% p.a.
1968	665	—
1975	685	+0.42%
1982	734	+0.99%
1990	870	+2.15%
1999	980	+1.33%
2007	1,245	+3.04%
2012	1,579	+4.87%
2017	1,537	−0.54%
2023	1,561	+0.26%
Source: INSEE

== See also ==
- Communes of the Gard department
