= Bragassargues =

Commune in Occitanie, France

- Commune
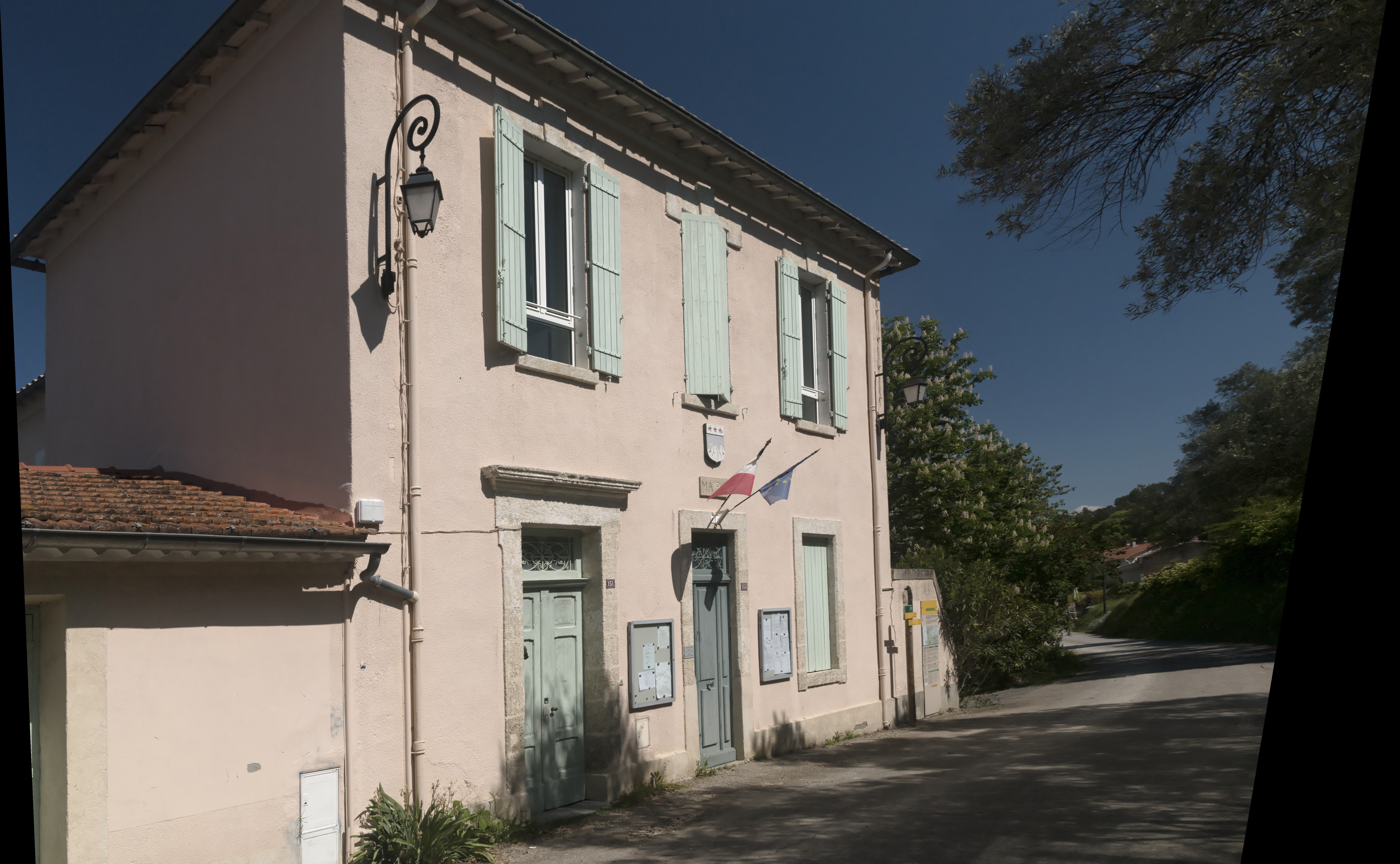
- Town hall

- Coat of arms
- Location of Bragassargues
- Location within France Location within Occitanie
- Coordinates: 43°55′04″N 4°03′06″E
- Country: France
- Region: Occitania
- Department: Gard
- Arrondissement: Le Vigan
- Canton: Quissac

Government
  - Mayor (2020–2026): Jean-Pierre Zucconi
- Area^{1}: 7.49 km^{2} (2.89 sq mi)
- Elevation: 70 m (230 ft)
- Highest elevation: 243 m (797 ft)
- Lowest elevation: 69 m (226 ft)
- Population (2023): 169
  - Density: 22.6/km^{2} (58.4/sq mi)
- Time zone: UTC+01:00 (CET)
  - Summer (DST): UTC+02:00 (CEST)
- INSEE/Postal code: 30050 /30260
- ^{1} French Land Register data, which excludes lakes, ponds, glaciers > 1 km^{2} (0.386 sq mi or 247 acres) and river estuaries.

Bragassargues (French pronunciation: [bʁaɡasaʁɡ]；Occitan: Bragaçargues) is a commune in the Gard department in southern France.

== Population ==
Historical population
Year	Pop.	±% p.a.
1968	76	—
1975	54	−4.76%
1982	68	+3.35%
1990	94	+4.13%
1999	94	+0.00%
2007	129	+4.04%
2012	143	+2.08%
2017	175	+4.12%
2023	169	−0.58%
Source: INSEE

== See also ==
- Communes of the Gard department
