= Boucoiran-et-Nozières =

Commune in Occitanie, France

- Commune
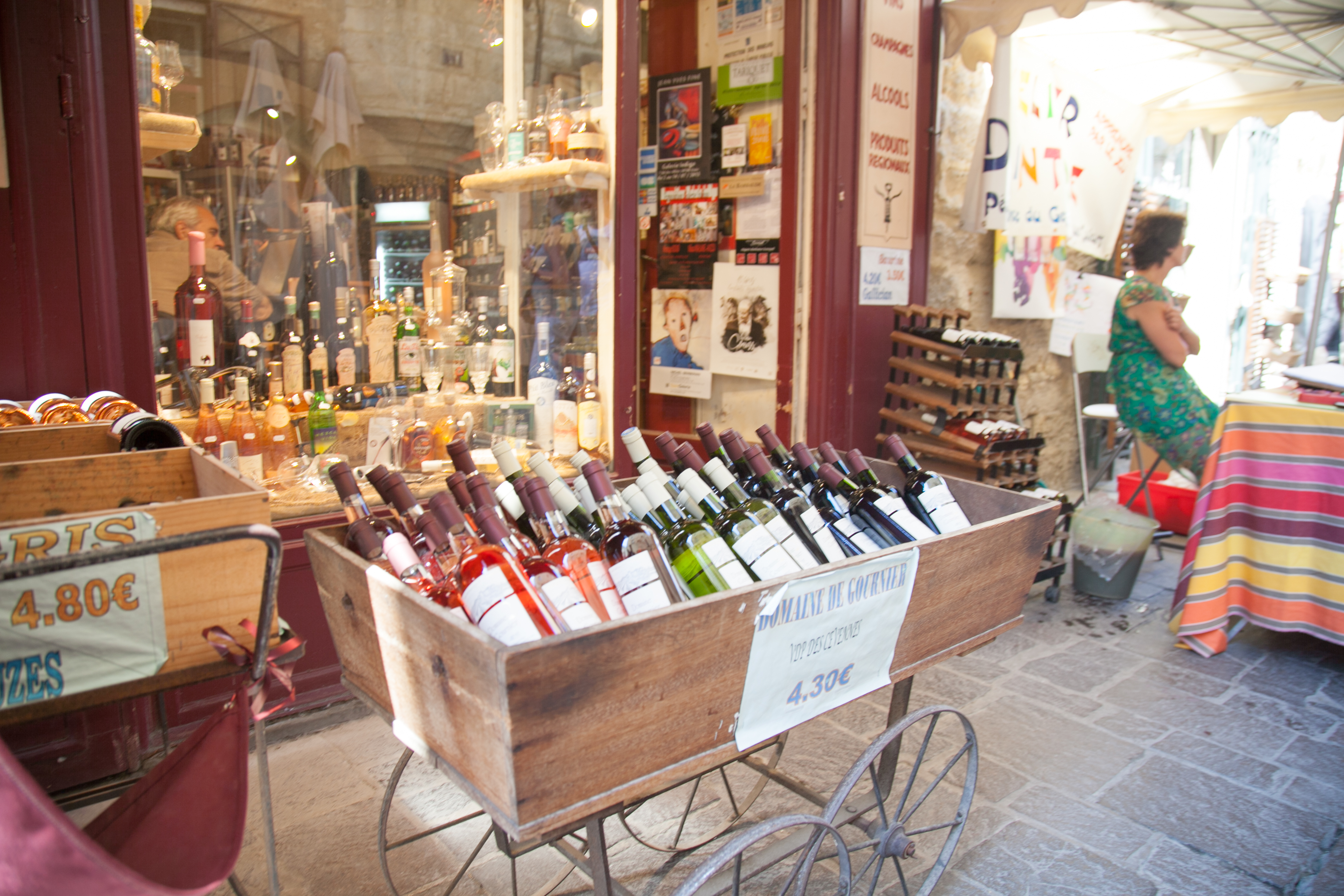
- A wine shop in Boucoiran-et-Nozières

- Coat of arms
- Location of Boucoiran-et-Nozières
- Location within France Location within Occitanie
- Coordinates: 43°59′46″N 4°11′10″E
- Country: France
- Region: Occitania
- Department: Gard
- Arrondissement: Alès
- Canton: Quissac
- Intercommunality: Alès Agglomération

Government
  - Mayor (2020–2026): Jean-Jacques Vidal
- Area^{1}: 14.52 km^{2} (5.61 sq mi)
- Elevation: 81 m (266 ft)
- Highest elevation: 242 m (794 ft)
- Lowest elevation: 76 m (249 ft)
- Population (2023): 991
  - Density: 68.3/km^{2} (177/sq mi)
- Time zone: UTC+01:00 (CET)
  - Summer (DST): UTC+02:00 (CEST)
- INSEE/Postal code: 30046 /30190
- ^{1} French Land Register data, which excludes lakes, ponds, glaciers > 1 km^{2} (0.386 sq mi or 247 acres) and river estuaries.

Boucoiran-et-Nozières (French pronunciation: [bukwaʁɑ̃ e nɔzjɛʁ]; Occitan: Bocoiran e Nosièira) is a commune in the Gard department in southern France.

== Population ==
Historical population
Year	Pop.	±% p.a.
1968	599	—
1975	584	−0.36%
1982	576	−0.20%
1990	609	+0.70%
1999	621	+0.22%
2007	707	+1.63%
2012	809	+2.73%
2017	947	+3.20%
2023	991	+0.76%
Source: INSEE

== See also ==
- Communes of the Gard department
