= Puechredon =

- Commune
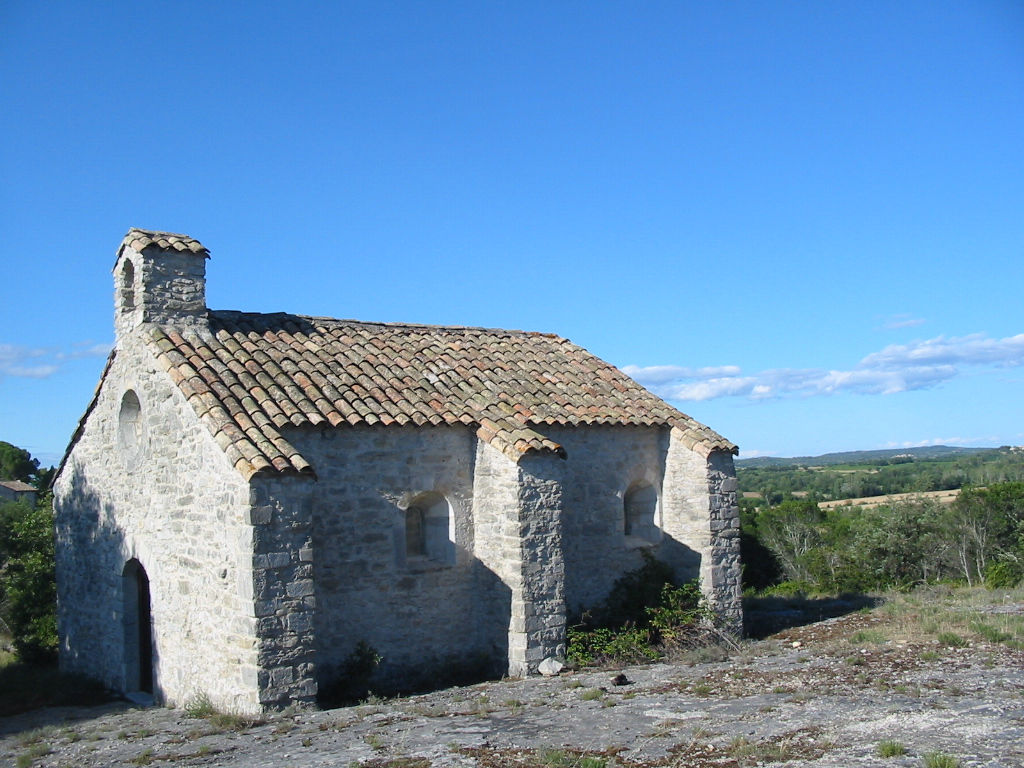
- The church of Puechredon

- Coat of arms
- Location of Puechredon
- Location within France Location within Occitanie
- Coordinates: 43°57′28″N 4°02′53″E
- Country: France
- Region: Occitania
- Department: Gard
- Arrondissement: Le Vigan
- Canton: Quissac

Government
  - Mayor (2020–2026): Guillaume Gras
- Area^{1}: 8.08 km^{2} (3.12 sq mi)
- Elevation: 130 m (430 ft)
- Highest elevation: 242 m (794 ft)
- Lowest elevation: 93 m (305 ft)
- Population (2023): 49
  - Density: 6.1/km^{2} (16/sq mi)
- Time zone: UTC+01:00 (CET)
  - Summer (DST): UTC+02:00 (CEST)
- INSEE/Postal code: 30208 /30610
- ^{1} French Land Register data, which excludes lakes, ponds, glaciers > 1 km^{2} (0.386 sq mi or 247 acres) and river estuaries.

Puechredon is a commune in the Gard department in southern France.

== Population ==
Historical population
Year	Pop.	±% p.a.
1968	38	—
1975	20	−8.76%
1982	30	+5.96%
1990	35	+1.95%
1999	36	+0.31%
2007	37	+0.34%
2012	36	−0.55%
2017	40	+2.13%
2023	49	+3.44%
Source: INSEE

== See also ==
- Communes of the Gard department
