= Saint-Jean-de-Serres =

- Commune
- Location of Saint-Jean-de-Serres
- Location within France Location within Occitanie
- Coordinates: 43°59′39″N 4°04′14″E
- Country: France
- Region: Occitania
- Department: Gard
- Arrondissement: Alès
- Canton: Quissac
- Intercommunality: Alès Agglomération

Government
  - Mayor (2020–2026): Andrée Roux
- Area^{1}: 8.26 km^{2} (3.19 sq mi)
- Elevation: 125 m (410 ft)
- Highest elevation: 169 m (554 ft)
- Lowest elevation: 94 m (308 ft)
- Population (2023): 542
  - Density: 65.6/km^{2} (170/sq mi)
- Time zone: UTC+01:00 (CET)
  - Summer (DST): UTC+02:00 (CEST)
- INSEE/Postal code: 30267 /30350
- ^{1} French Land Register data, which excludes lakes, ponds, glaciers > 1 km^{2} (0.386 sq mi or 247 acres) and river estuaries.

Saint-Jean-de-Serres (French pronunciation: [sɛ̃ ʒɑ̃ də sɛʁ]; Occitan: Sent Joan de Sèrres) is a commune in the Gard department in southern France.

== Population ==
Historical population
| Year | Pop. | ±% p.a. |
|---|---|---|
| 1968 | 297 | — |
| 1975 | 305 | +0.38% |
| 1982 | 306 | +0.05% |
| 1990 | 382 | +2.81% |
| 1999 | 444 | +1.69% |
| 2007 | 507 | +1.67% |
| 2012 | 518 | +0.43% |
| 2017 | 521 | +0.12% |
| 2023 | 542 | +0.66% |
Source: INSEE

== See also ==
- Communes of the Gard department
