= Corconne =

- Commune
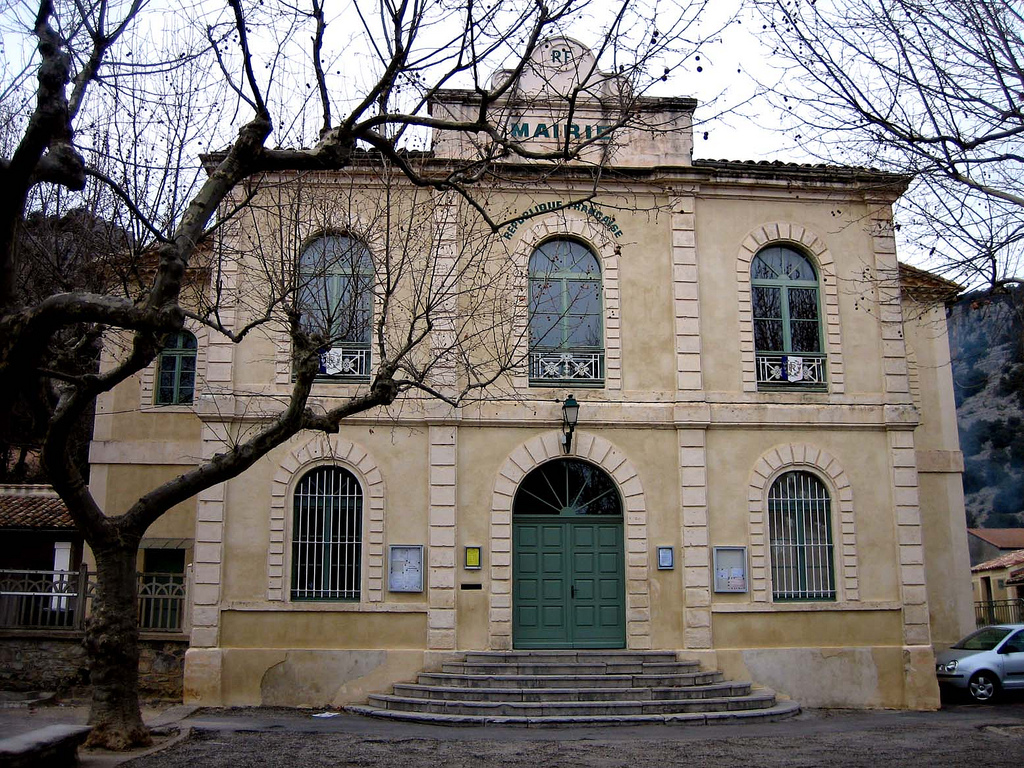
- Town hall

- Coat of arms
- Location of Corconne
- Location within France Location within Occitanie
- Coordinates: 43°52′22″N 3°56′25″E
- Country: France
- Region: Occitania
- Department: Gard
- Arrondissement: Le Vigan
- Canton: Quissac

Government
  - Mayor (2020–2026): Lionel Jean
- Area^{1}: 12.98 km^{2} (5.01 sq mi)
- Elevation: 165 m (541 ft)
- Highest elevation: 380 m (1,250 ft)
- Lowest elevation: 96 m (315 ft)
- Population (2023): 620
  - Density: 48/km^{2} (120/sq mi)
- Time zone: UTC+01:00 (CET)
  - Summer (DST): UTC+02:00 (CEST)
- INSEE/Postal code: 30095 /30260
- ^{1} French Land Register data, which excludes lakes, ponds, glaciers > 1 km^{2} (0.386 sq mi or 247 acres) and river estuaries.

Corconne (French pronunciation: [kɔʁkɔn]; Occitan: Corcòna) is a commune in the Gard department in southern France.

== Population ==
Historical population
Year	Pop.	±% p.a.
1968	263	—
1975	239	−1.36%
1982	307	+3.64%
1990	386	+2.90%
1999	482	+2.50%
2007	565	+2.01%
2012	547	−0.65%
2017	542	−0.18%
2023	620	+2.27%
Source: INSEE

== See also ==
- Communes of the Gard department
