= Savignargues =

- Commune
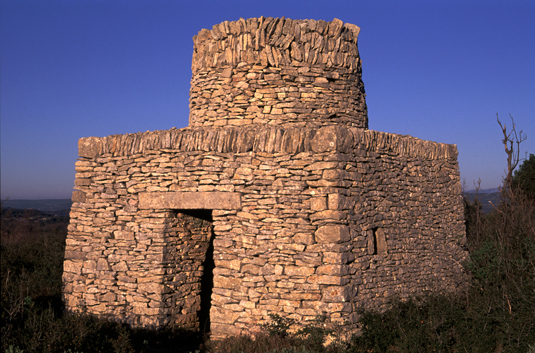
- Dry stone cabin

- Coat of arms
- Location of Savignargues
- Location within France Location within Occitanie
- Coordinates: 43°57′47″N 4°05′02″E
- Country: France
- Region: Occitania
- Department: Gard
- Arrondissement: Le Vigan
- Canton: Quissac

Government
  - Mayor (2020–2026): Stéphanie Laurent
- Area^{1}: 2.77 km^{2} (1.07 sq mi)
- Elevation: 84 m (276 ft)
- Highest elevation: 142 m (466 ft)
- Lowest elevation: 97 m (318 ft)
- Population (2023): 238
  - Density: 85.9/km^{2} (223/sq mi)
- Time zone: UTC+01:00 (CET)
  - Summer (DST): UTC+02:00 (CEST)
- INSEE/Postal code: 30314 /30350
- ^{1} French Land Register data, which excludes lakes, ponds, glaciers > 1 km^{2} (0.386 sq mi or 247 acres) and river estuaries.

Savignargues (French pronunciation: [saviɲaʁg]; Occitan: Savinhargues) is a commune in the Gard department in southern France.

== Population ==
Historical population
Year	Pop.	±% p.a.
1968	114	—
1975	121	+0.85%
1982	123	+0.23%
1990	144	+1.99%
1999	142	−0.16%
2007	199	+4.31%
2012	228	+2.76%
2017	239	+0.95%
2023	238	−0.07%
Source: INSEE

== See also ==
- Communes of the Gard department
