= Saint-Félix-de-Pallières =

- Commune
- Coat of arms
- Location of Saint-Félix-de-Pallières
- Location within France Location within Occitanie
- Coordinates: 44°01′27″N 3°55′59″E
- Country: France
- Region: Occitania
- Department: Gard
- Arrondissement: Le Vigan
- Canton: Quissac

Government
  - Mayor (2024–2026): Michel Sala
- Area^{1}: 18.87 km^{2} (7.29 sq mi)
- Elevation: 250 m (820 ft)
- Highest elevation: 482 m (1,581 ft)
- Lowest elevation: 180 m (590 ft)
- Population (2023): 194
  - Density: 10.3/km^{2} (26.6/sq mi)
- Time zone: UTC+01:00 (CET)
  - Summer (DST): UTC+02:00 (CEST)
- INSEE/Postal code: 30252 /30140
- ^{1} French Land Register data, which excludes lakes, ponds, glaciers > 1 km^{2} (0.386 sq mi or 247 acres) and river estuaries.

Saint-Félix-de-Pallières (French pronunciation: [sɛ̃ feliks də paljɛʁ]; Occitan: Sent Feliç de Palhièira) is a commune in the Gard department in southern France.

== Population ==
Historical population
Year	Pop.	±% p.a.
1968	201	—
1975	148	−4.28%
1982	151	+0.29%
1990	167	+1.27%
1999	203	+2.19%
2007	233	+1.74%
2012	219	−1.23%
2017	252	+2.85%
2023	194	−4.27%
Source: INSEE

== See also ==
- Communes of the Gard department
