= Logrian-Florian =

- Commune
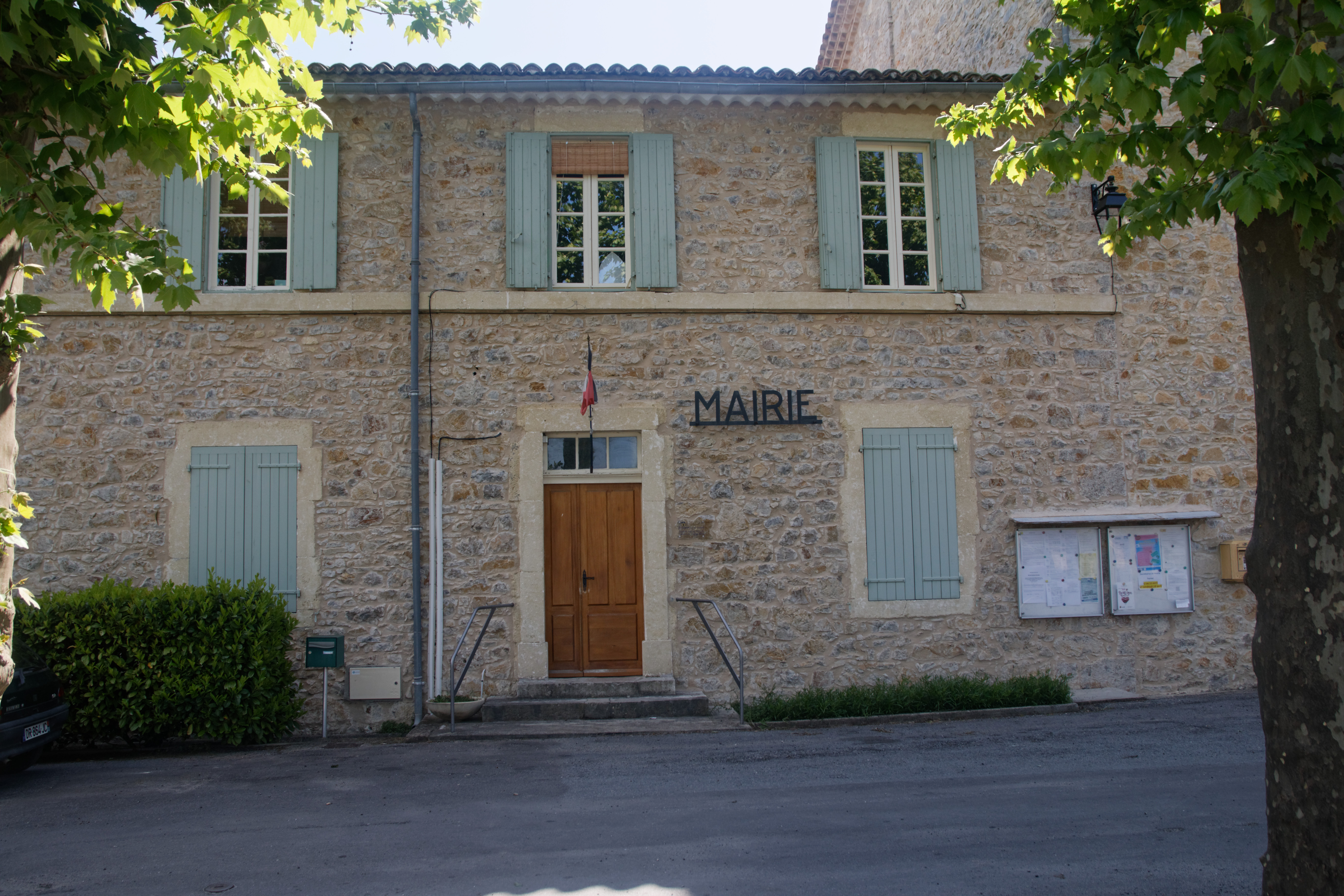
- The Town Hall of Logrian-Florian

- Coat of arms
- Location of Logrian-Florian
- Location within France Location within Occitanie
- Coordinates: 43°57′24″N 4°01′47″E
- Country: France
- Region: Occitania
- Department: Gard
- Arrondissement: Le Vigan
- Canton: Quissac
- Intercommunality: Piémont Cévenol

Government
  - Mayor (2020–2026): Jean-Marie Castellvi
- Area^{1}: 8.58 km^{2} (3.31 sq mi)
- Elevation: 118 m (387 ft)
- Highest elevation: 186 m (610 ft)
- Lowest elevation: 74 m (243 ft)
- Population (2023): 270
  - Density: 31/km^{2} (82/sq mi)
- Time zone: UTC+01:00 (CET)
  - Summer (DST): UTC+02:00 (CEST)
- INSEE/Postal code: 30150 /30610
- ^{1} French Land Register data, which excludes lakes, ponds, glaciers > 1 km^{2} (0.386 sq mi or 247 acres) and river estuaries.

Logrian-Florian (French pronunciation: [lɔɡʁijɑ̃ flɔʁjɑ̃]) is a commune in the Gard department in southern France.

== Population ==
Historical population
Year	Pop.	±% p.a.
1968	177	—
1975	154	−1.97%
1982	152	−0.19%
1990	170	+1.41%
1999	227	+3.26%
2007	256	+1.51%
2012	267	+0.84%
2017	264	−0.23%
2023	270	+0.38%
Source: INSEE

== See also ==
- Communes of the Gard department
