= Massillargues-Attuech =

Massillargues-Atuech
- Commune
- Coat of arms
- Location of Massillargues-Atuech
- Location within France Location within Occitanie
- Coordinates: 44°00′57″N 4°01′30″E
- Country: France
- Region: Occitania
- Department: Gard
- Arrondissement: Alès
- Canton: Quissac
- Intercommunality: Alès Agglomération

Government
  - Mayor (2020–2026): Aurélie Genolher
- Area^{1}: 6.27 km^{2} (2.42 sq mi)
- Elevation: 122 m (400 ft)
- Highest elevation: 179 m (587 ft)
- Lowest elevation: 112 m (367 ft)
- Population (2023): 672
  - Density: 107/km^{2} (278/sq mi)
- Time zone: UTC+01:00 (CET)
  - Summer (DST): UTC+02:00 (CEST)
- INSEE/Postal code: 30162 /30140
- ^{1} French Land Register data, which excludes lakes, ponds, glaciers > 1 km^{2} (0.386 sq mi or 247 acres) and river estuaries.

Massillargues-Attuech (French pronunciation: [masijaʁɡ atɥɛʃ]) is a commune in the Gard department in southern France.

== Population ==
Historical population
Year	Pop.	±% p.a.
1968	335	—
1975	318	−0.74%
1982	331	+0.57%
1990	419	+2.99%
1999	522	+2.47%
2007	696	+3.66%
2012	680	−0.46%
2017	662	−0.54%
2023	672	+0.25%
Source: INSEE

== See also ==
- Communes of the Gard department
