= Cruviers-Lascours =

- Commune
- Coat of arms
- Location of Cruviers-Lascours
- Location within France Location within Occitanie
- Coordinates: 44°00′17″N 4°12′19″E
- Country: France
- Region: Occitania
- Department: Gard
- Arrondissement: Alès
- Canton: Quissac
- Intercommunality: Alès Agglomération

Government
  - Mayor (2020–2026): Fabien Fiard
- Area^{1}: 5.52 km^{2} (2.13 sq mi)
- Elevation: 82 m (269 ft)
- Highest elevation: 171 m (561 ft)
- Lowest elevation: 74 m (243 ft)
- Population (2023): 707
  - Density: 128/km^{2} (332/sq mi)
- Time zone: UTC+01:00 (CET)
  - Summer (DST): UTC+02:00 (CEST)
- INSEE/Postal code: 30100 /30360
- ^{1} French Land Register data, which excludes lakes, ponds, glaciers > 1 km^{2} (0.386 sq mi or 247 acres) and river estuaries.

Cruviers-Lascours (French pronunciation: [kʁyvje laskuʁ]; Occitan: Cruvièrs e las Corts) is a commune in the Gard department in southern France.

== Population ==
Historical population
Year	Pop.	±% p.a.
1968	276	—
1975	296	+1.00%
1982	348	+2.34%
1990	437	+2.89%
1999	438	+0.03%
2007	585	+3.68%
2012	668	+2.69%
2017	702	+1.00%
2023	707	+0.12%
Source: INSEE

== See also ==
- Official website
- Communes of the Gard department
