= Saint-Jean-de-Crieulon =

- Commune
- Location of Saint-Jean-de-Crieulon
- Location within France Location within Occitanie
- Coordinates: 43°58′22″N 3°59′34″E
- Country: France
- Region: Occitania
- Department: Gard
- Arrondissement: Le Vigan
- Canton: Quissac

Government
  - Mayor (2020–2026): Jean-Louïs Cuenot
- Area^{1}: 5.57 km^{2} (2.15 sq mi)
- Elevation: 120 m (390 ft)
- Highest elevation: 175 m (574 ft)
- Lowest elevation: 80 m (260 ft)
- Population (2023): 264
  - Density: 47.4/km^{2} (123/sq mi)
- Time zone: UTC+01:00 (CET)
  - Summer (DST): UTC+02:00 (CEST)
- INSEE/Postal code: 30265 /30610
- ^{1} French Land Register data, which excludes lakes, ponds, glaciers > 1 km^{2} (0.386 sq mi or 247 acres) and river estuaries.

Saint-Jean-de-Crieulon (French pronunciation: [sɛ̃ ʒɑ̃ də kʁijœlɔ̃]; Occitan: Vilaseca) is a commune in the Gard department in southern France.

== Population ==
Historical population
| Year | Pop. | ±% p.a. |
|---|---|---|
| 1968 | 106 | — |
| 1975 | 112 | +0.79% |
| 1982 | 121 | +1.11% |
| 1990 | 151 | +2.81% |
| 1999 | 146 | −0.37% |
| 2007 | 204 | +4.27% |
| 2012 | 235 | +2.87% |
| 2017 | 246 | +0.92% |
| 2023 | 264 | +1.18% |
Source: INSEE

== See also ==
- Communes of the Gard department
