= Carnas =

Commune in Occitanie, France

- Commune
- Coat of arms
- Location of Carnas
- Location within France Location within Occitanie
- Coordinates: 43°49′55″N 3°59′19″E
- Country: France
- Region: Occitania
- Department: Gard
- Arrondissement: Le Vigan
- Canton: Quissac

Government
  - Mayor (2020–2026): Joël Roudil
- Area^{1}: 15.49 km^{2} (5.98 sq mi)
- Elevation: 80 m (260 ft)
- Highest elevation: 223 m (732 ft)
- Lowest elevation: 66 m (217 ft)
- Population (2023): 537
  - Density: 34.7/km^{2} (89.8/sq mi)
- Time zone: UTC+01:00 (CET)
  - Summer (DST): UTC+02:00 (CEST)
- INSEE/Postal code: 30069 /30260
- ^{1} French Land Register data, which excludes lakes, ponds, glaciers > 1 km^{2} (0.386 sq mi or 247 acres) and river estuaries.

Carnas (French pronunciation: [kaʁnas]; Occitan: Carnaç) is a commune in the Gard department in southern France.

== Population ==
Historical population
Year	Pop.	±% p.a.
1968	259	—
1975	218	−2.43%
1982	220	+0.13%
1990	266	+2.40%
1999	317	+1.97%
2007	384	+2.43%
2012	441	+2.81%
2017	479	+1.67%
2023	537	+1.92%
Source: INSEE

== See also ==
- Communes of the Gard department
