= Brignon =

Commune in Occitanie, France

- Commune
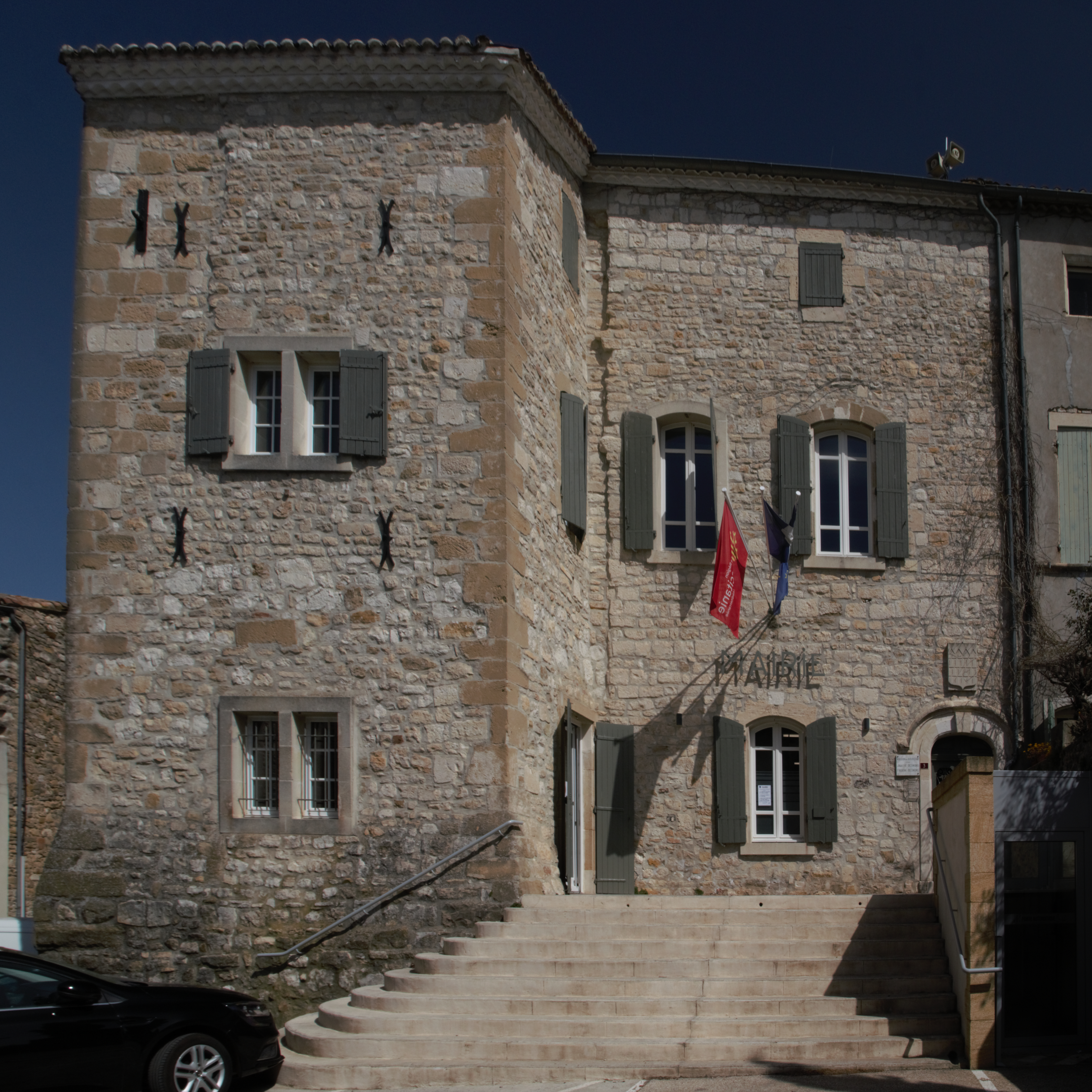
- Town hall

- Coat of arms
- Location of Brignon
- Location within France Location within Occitanie
- Coordinates: 43°59′23″N 4°12′52″E
- Country: France
- Region: Occitania
- Department: Gard
- Arrondissement: Alès
- Canton: Quissac
- Intercommunality: Alès Agglomération

Government
  - Mayor (2020–2026): Rémy Bouet
- Area^{1}: 6.67 km^{2} (2.58 sq mi)
- Elevation: 78 m (256 ft)
- Highest elevation: 141 m (463 ft)
- Lowest elevation: 72 m (236 ft)
- Population (2023): 701
  - Density: 105/km^{2} (272/sq mi)
- Time zone: UTC+01:00 (CET)
  - Summer (DST): UTC+02:00 (CEST)
- INSEE/Postal code: 30053 /30190
- ^{1} French Land Register data, which excludes lakes, ponds, glaciers > 1 km^{2} (0.386 sq mi or 247 acres) and river estuaries.

Brignon (French pronunciation: [bʁiɲɔ̃]; Occitan: Brinhon) is a commune in the Gard department in southern France.

== Population ==
Historical population
Year	Pop.	±% p.a.
1968	600	—
1975	564	−0.88%
1982	648	+2.00%
1990	616	−0.63%
1999	658	+0.74%
2007	785	+2.23%
2012	801	+0.40%
2017	771	−0.76%
2023	701	−1.57%
Source: INSEE

== See also ==
- Communes of the Gard department
