= Colognac =

Commune in Occitanie, France

- Commune
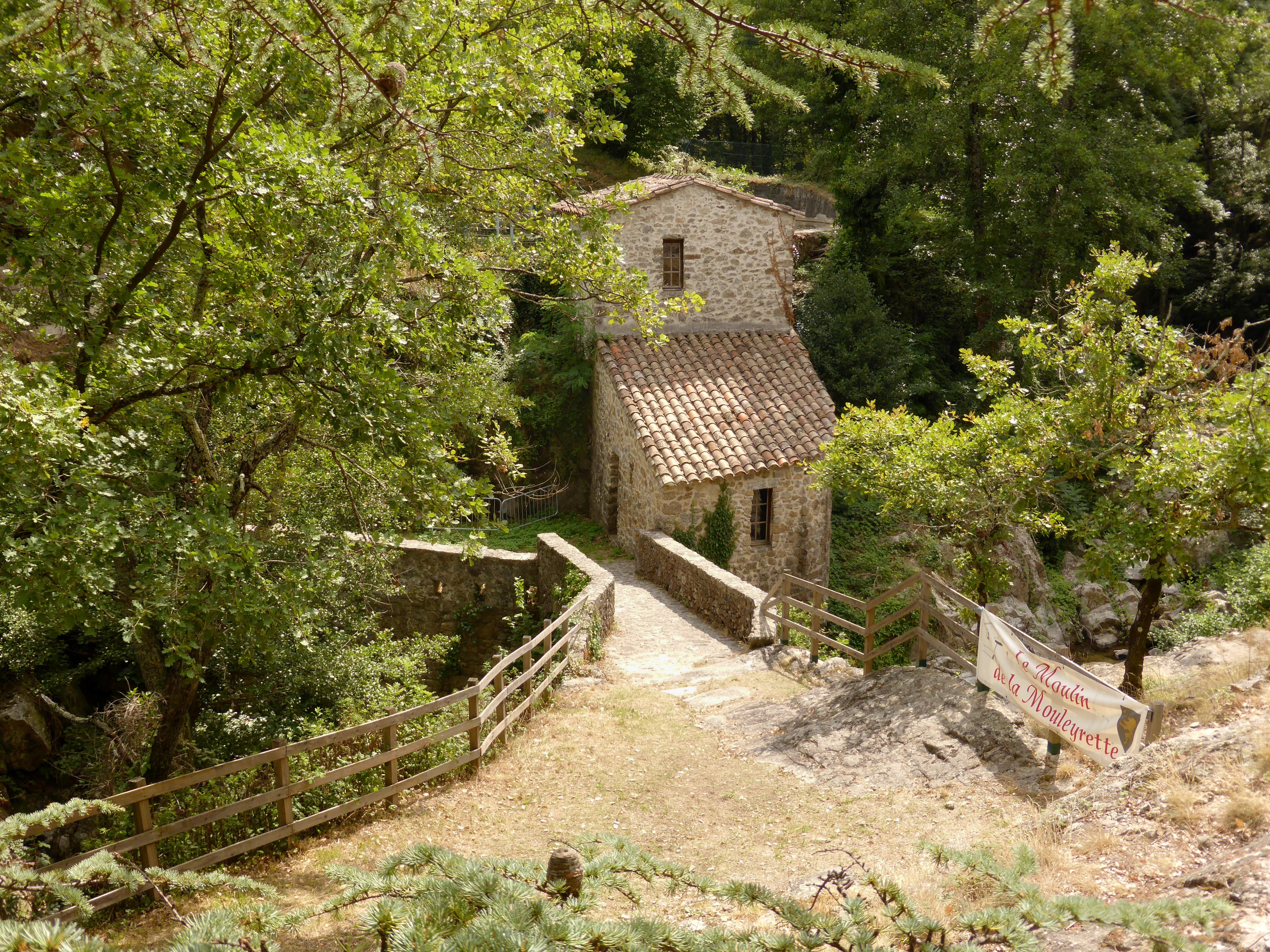
- The Mouleyrette mill

- Coat of arms
- Location of Colognac
- Location within France Location within Occitanie
- Coordinates: 44°01′46″N 3°49′22″E
- Country: France
- Region: Occitania
- Department: Gard
- Arrondissement: Le Vigan
- Canton: Quissac

Government
  - Mayor (2020–2026): Cyrille Bresset
- Area^{1}: 12.3 km^{2} (4.7 sq mi)
- Elevation: 569 m (1,867 ft)
- Highest elevation: 997 m (3,271 ft)
- Lowest elevation: 318 m (1,043 ft)
- Population (2023): 190
  - Density: 15/km^{2} (40/sq mi)
- Time zone: UTC+01:00 (CET)
  - Summer (DST): UTC+02:00 (CEST)
- INSEE/Postal code: 30087 /30460
- ^{1} French Land Register data, which excludes lakes, ponds, glaciers > 1 km^{2} (0.386 sq mi or 247 acres) and river estuaries.

Colognac (French pronunciation: [kɔlɔɲak]; Occitan: Colonhac) is a commune in the Gard department in southern France.

== Geography ==
=== Climate ===
Colognac has a warm-summer Mediterranean climate (Köppen climate classification Csb). The average annual temperature in Colognac is 12.3 °C (54.1 °F). The average annual rainfall is 1,502.4 mm (59.15 in) with November as the wettest month. The temperatures are highest on average in August, at around 21.1 °C (70.0 °F), and lowest in January, at around 4.9 °C (40.8 °F). The highest temperature ever recorded in Colognac was 40.9 °C (105.6 °F) on 21 August 2012; the coldest temperature ever recorded was −13.0 °C (8.6 °F) on 27 February 2018.

Climate data for Colognac (1991−2020 normals, extremes 1992−present)
| Month | Jan | Feb | Mar | Apr | May | Jun | Jul | Aug | Sep | Oct | Nov | Dec | Year |
|---|---|---|---|---|---|---|---|---|---|---|---|---|---|
| Record high °C (°F) | 20.1 (68.2) | 22.8 (73.0) | 29.1 (84.4) | 29.3 (84.7) | 34.0 (93.2) | 38.7 (101.7) | 36.3 (97.3) | 40.9 (105.6) | 32.1 (89.8) | 33.4 (92.1) | 22.5 (72.5) | 18.7 (65.7) | 40.9 (105.6) |
| Mean daily maximum °C (°F) | 8.8 (47.8) | 10.1 (50.2) | 13.6 (56.5) | 16.0 (60.8) | 20.2 (68.4) | 24.7 (76.5) | 27.7 (81.9) | 27.9 (82.2) | 22.3 (72.1) | 17.1 (62.8) | 12.2 (54.0) | 9.4 (48.9) | 17.5 (63.5) |
| Daily mean °C (°F) | 4.9 (40.8) | 5.6 (42.1) | 8.5 (47.3) | 10.9 (51.6) | 14.5 (58.1) | 18.5 (65.3) | 21.1 (70.0) | 21.1 (70.0) | 16.6 (61.9) | 12.7 (54.9) | 8.2 (46.8) | 5.6 (42.1) | 12.3 (54.1) |
| Mean daily minimum °C (°F) | 1.0 (33.8) | 1.1 (34.0) | 3.5 (38.3) | 5.7 (42.3) | 8.9 (48.0) | 12.3 (54.1) | 14.4 (57.9) | 14.3 (57.7) | 10.9 (51.6) | 8.2 (46.8) | 4.3 (39.7) | 1.8 (35.2) | 7.2 (45.0) |
| Record low °C (°F) | −10.5 (13.1) | −13.0 (8.6) | −9.4 (15.1) | −4.7 (23.5) | −0.8 (30.6) | 3.2 (37.8) | 5.6 (42.1) | 6.1 (43.0) | 2.2 (36.0) | −5.1 (22.8) | −7.5 (18.5) | −9.9 (14.2) | −13.0 (8.6) |
| Average precipitation mm (inches) | 123.4 (4.86) | 86.3 (3.40) | 103.0 (4.06) | 132.6 (5.22) | 124.1 (4.89) | 65.9 (2.59) | 43.6 (1.72) | 59.8 (2.35) | 165.7 (6.52) | 217.3 (8.56) | 221.7 (8.73) | 159.0 (6.26) | 1,502.4 (59.15) |
| Average precipitation days (≥ 1.0 mm) | 9.0 | 6.6 | 6.2 | 8.4 | 8.7 | 6.3 | 4.6 | 4.9 | 6.0 | 9.9 | 10.3 | 8.9 | 89.8 |
Source: Météo-France

== Population ==
Historical population
| Year | Pop. | ±% p.a. |
|---|---|---|
| 1968 | 142 | — |
| 1975 | 154 | +1.17% |
| 1982 | 164 | +0.90% |
| 1990 | 167 | +0.23% |
| 1999 | 169 | +0.13% |
| 2007 | 201 | +2.19% |
| 2012 | 189 | −1.22% |
| 2017 | 221 | +3.18% |
| 2023 | 190 | −2.49% |
Source: INSEE

== See also ==
- Communes of the Gard department
