= Massanes, Gard =

Massanes
- Commune
- Coat of arms
- Location of Massanes
- Location within France Location within Occitanie
- Coordinates: 44°01′22″N 4°06′49″E
- Country: France
- Region: Occitania
- Department: Gard
- Arrondissement: Alès
- Canton: Quissac
- Intercommunality: Alès Agglomération

Government
  - Mayor (2020–2026): Laurent Chapellier
- Area^{1}: 1.64 km^{2} (0.63 sq mi)
- Elevation: 107 m (351 ft)
- Highest elevation: 162 m (531 ft)
- Lowest elevation: 92 m (302 ft)
- Population (2023): 184
  - Density: 112/km^{2} (291/sq mi)
- Time zone: UTC+01:00 (CET)
  - Summer (DST): UTC+02:00 (CEST)
- INSEE/Postal code: 30161 /30350
- ^{1} French Land Register data, which excludes lakes, ponds, glaciers > 1 km^{2} (0.386 sq mi or 247 acres) and river estuaries.

Massanes (French pronunciation: [masan]; Occitan: Maçanas) is a commune in the Gard department in southern France.

== Population ==
Historical population
Year	Pop.	±% p.a.
1968	142	—
1975	118	−2.61%
1982	128	+1.17%
1990	171	+3.69%
1999	137	−2.43%
2007	173	+2.96%
2012	193	+2.21%
2017	194	+0.10%
2023	184	−0.88%
Source: INSEE

== See also ==
- Communes of the Gard department
