= Durfort-et-Saint-Martin-de-Sossenac =

- Commune
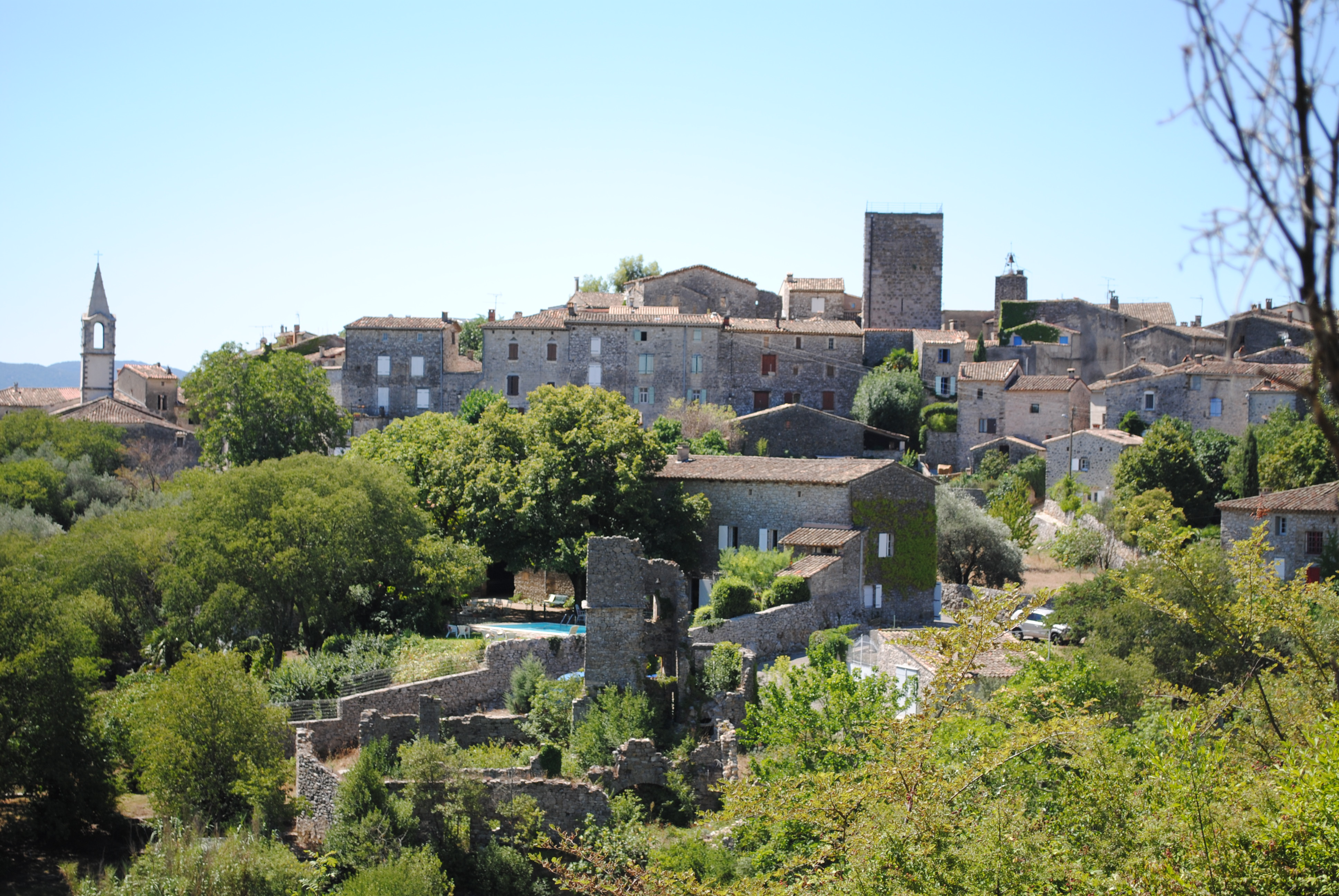
- A general view of Durfort

- Coat of arms
- Location of Durfort-et-Saint-Martin-de-Sossenac
- Location within France Location within Occitanie
- Coordinates: 43°59′29″N 3°57′22″E
- Country: France
- Region: Occitania
- Department: Gard
- Arrondissement: Le Vigan
- Canton: Quissac

Government
  - Mayor (2020–2026): Robert Condomines
- Area^{1}: 16.28 km^{2} (6.29 sq mi)
- Elevation: 80 m (260 ft)
- Highest elevation: 324 m (1,063 ft)
- Lowest elevation: 120 m (390 ft)
- Population (2023): 756
  - Density: 46.4/km^{2} (120/sq mi)
- Time zone: UTC+01:00 (CET)
  - Summer (DST): UTC+02:00 (CEST)
- INSEE/Postal code: 30106 /30170
- ^{1} French Land Register data, which excludes lakes, ponds, glaciers > 1 km^{2} (0.386 sq mi or 247 acres) and river estuaries.

Durfort-et-Saint-Martin-de-Sossenac (French pronunciation: [dyʁfɔʁ e sɛ̃ maʁtɛ̃ də sɔsnak]; Occitan: Durfòrt e Sent Martin de Sossenac) is a commune in the Gard department in southern France.

== Population ==
Historical population
Year	Pop.	±% p.a.
1968	454	—
1975	410	−1.45%
1982	388	−0.78%
1990	492	+3.01%
1999	595	+2.13%
2007	649	+1.09%
2012	744	+2.77%
2017	685	−1.64%
2023	756	+1.66%
Source: INSEE

== See also ==
- Communes of the Gard department
