= Quissac, Gard =

Quissac
- Commune
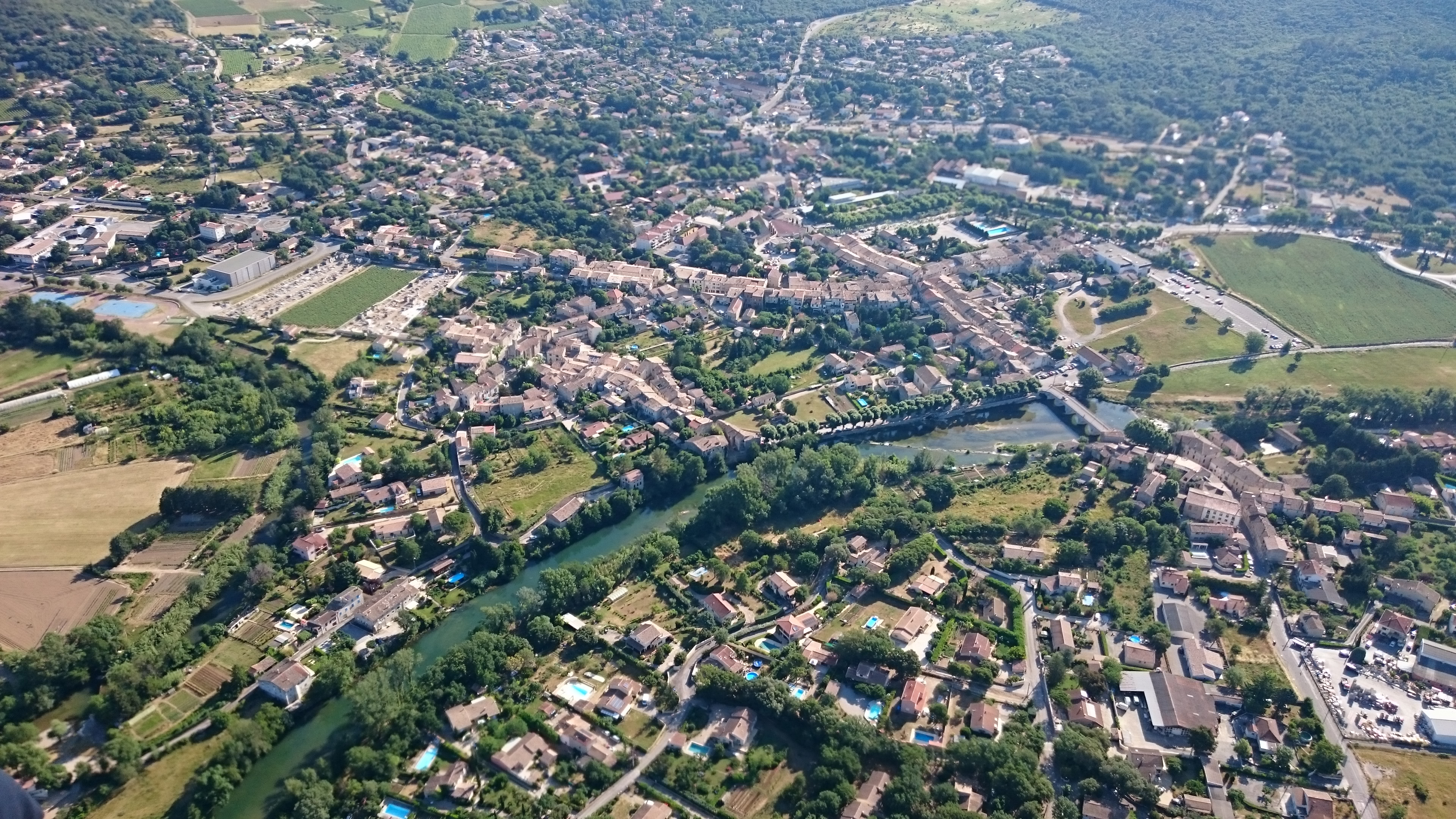
- Aerial view

- Coat of arms
- Location of Quissac
- Location within France Location within Occitanie
- Coordinates: 43°54′37″N 4°00′03″E
- Country: France
- Region: Occitania
- Department: Gard
- Arrondissement: Le Vigan
- Canton: Quissac
- Intercommunality: Piémont Cévenol

Government
  - Mayor (2020–2026): Serge Cathala
- Area^{1}: 23.32 km^{2} (9.00 sq mi)
- Elevation: 78 m (256 ft)
- Highest elevation: 472 m (1,549 ft)
- Lowest elevation: 60 m (200 ft)
- Population (2023): 3,528
  - Density: 151.3/km^{2} (391.8/sq mi)
- Time zone: UTC+01:00 (CET)
  - Summer (DST): UTC+02:00 (CEST)
- INSEE/Postal code: 30210 /30260
- ^{1} French Land Register data, which excludes lakes, ponds, glaciers > 1 km^{2} (0.386 sq mi or 247 acres) and river estuaries.

Quissac (French pronunciation: [kisak]; Occitan: Quiçac) is a commune in the department of Gard, Occitania, southern France.

== Population ==
Historical population
Year	Pop.	±% p.a.
1968	1,716	—
1975	1,953	+1.87%
1982	1,923	−0.22%
1990	2,052	+0.81%
1999	2,272	+1.14%
2007	2,609	+1.74%
2012	2,988	+2.75%
2017	3,216	+1.48%
2023	3,528	+1.56%
Source: INSEE

== See also ==
- Communes of the Gard department
