= Lédignan =

- Commune
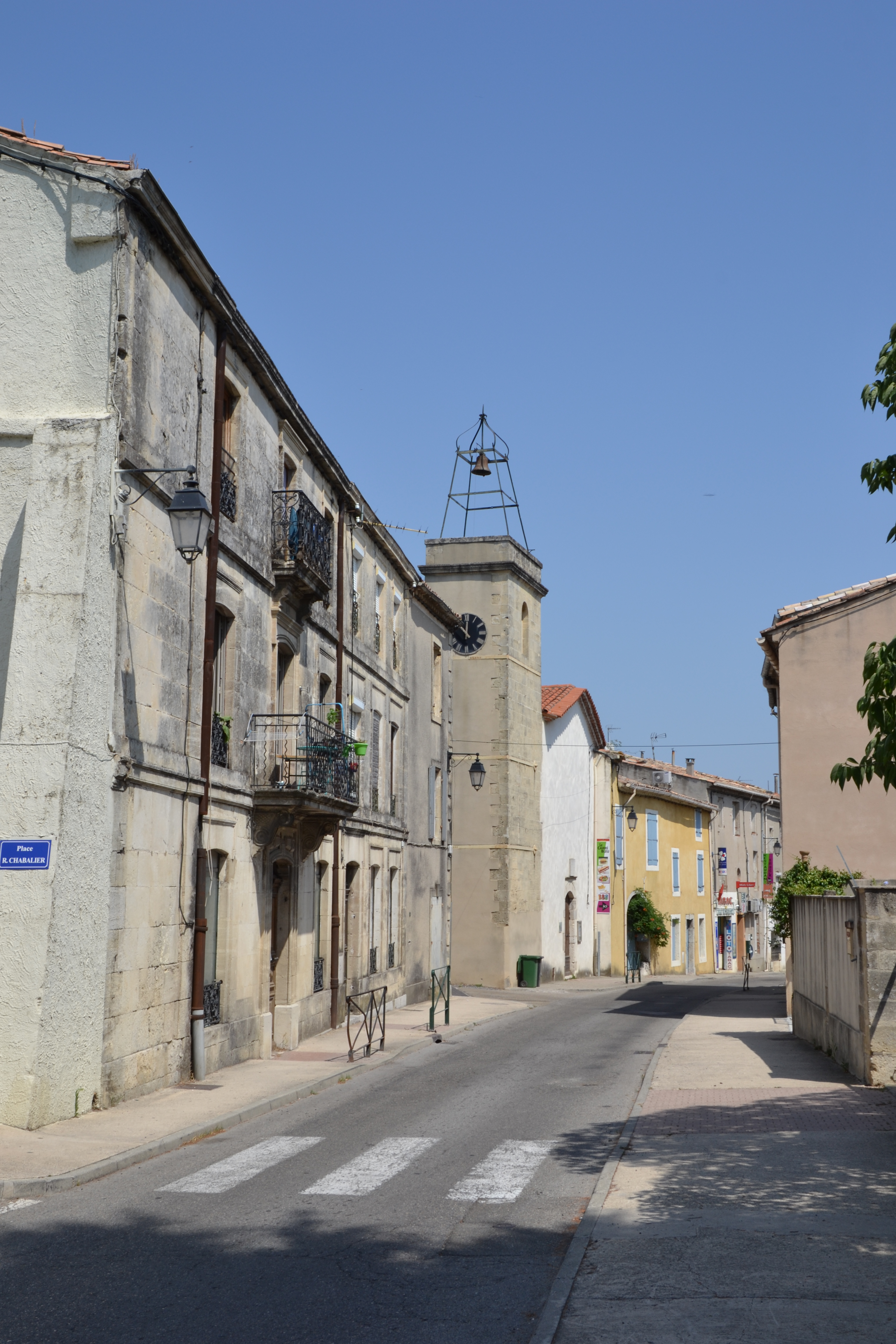
- View of the main street of Lédignan with the protestant temple in the center

- Coat of arms
- Location of Lédignan
- Location within France Location within Occitanie
- Coordinates: 43°59′22″N 4°06′26″E
- Country: France
- Region: Occitania
- Department: Gard
- Arrondissement: Le Vigan
- Canton: Quissac
- Intercommunality: Piémont Cévenol

Government
  - Mayor (2020–2026): Bernard Cauvin
- Area^{1}: 6.93 km^{2} (2.68 sq mi)
- Elevation: 141 m (463 ft)
- Highest elevation: 167 m (548 ft)
- Lowest elevation: 102 m (335 ft)
- Population (2023): 1,516
  - Density: 219/km^{2} (567/sq mi)
- Time zone: UTC+01:00 (CET)
  - Summer (DST): UTC+02:00 (CEST)
- INSEE/Postal code: 30146 /30350
- ^{1} French Land Register data, which excludes lakes, ponds, glaciers > 1 km^{2} (0.386 sq mi or 247 acres) and river estuaries.

Lédignan (French pronunciation: [lediɲɑ̃]; Provençal: Ledinhan) is a commune in the Gard department in southern France.

== Population ==
Historical population
Year	Pop.	±% p.a.
1968	752	—
1975	812	+1.10%
1982	815	+0.05%
1990	850	+0.53%
1999	995	+1.77%
2007	1,262	+3.02%
2012	1,432	+2.56%
2017	1,462	+0.42%
2023	1,516	+0.61%
Source: INSEE

== See also ==
- Communes of the Gard department
