= Cassagnoles, Gard =

Commune in Occitanie, France

Cassagnoles
- Commune
- Coat of arms
- Location of Cassagnoles
- Location within France Location within Occitanie
- Coordinates: 44°01′25″N 4°07′53″E
- Country: France
- Region: Occitania
- Department: Gard
- Arrondissement: Le Vigan
- Canton: Quissac

Government
  - Mayor (2020–2026): David Furestier
- Area^{1}: 5.19 km^{2} (2.00 sq mi)
- Elevation: 139 m (456 ft)
- Highest elevation: 183 m (600 ft)
- Lowest elevation: 84 m (276 ft)
- Population (2023): 457
  - Density: 88.1/km^{2} (228/sq mi)
- Time zone: UTC+01:00 (CET)
  - Summer (DST): UTC+02:00 (CEST)
- INSEE/Postal code: 30071 /30350
- ^{1} French Land Register data, which excludes lakes, ponds, glaciers > 1 km^{2} (0.386 sq mi or 247 acres) and river estuaries.

Cassagnoles (French pronunciation: [kasaɲɔl]; Occitan: Cassinhòlas) is a commune in the Gard department in southern France.

== Population ==
Historical population
Year	Pop.	±% p.a.
1968	206	—
1975	162	−3.37%
1982	166	+0.35%
1990	219	+3.52%
1999	244	+1.21%
2007	410	+6.70%
2012	428	+0.86%
2017	403	−1.20%
2023	457	+2.12%
Source: INSEE

== See also ==
- Communes of the Gard department
