= Saint-Nazaire-des-Gardies =

- Commune
- Coat of arms
- Location of Saint-Nazaire-des-Gardies
- Location within France Location within Occitanie
- Coordinates: 43°58′50″N 4°01′06″E
- Country: France
- Region: Occitania
- Department: Gard
- Arrondissement: Le Vigan
- Canton: Quissac

Government
  - Mayor (2020–2026): Pierre Mazauric
- Area^{1}: 11.29 km^{2} (4.36 sq mi)
- Elevation: 107 m (351 ft)
- Highest elevation: 194 m (636 ft)
- Lowest elevation: 83 m (272 ft)
- Population (2023): 80
  - Density: 7.1/km^{2} (18/sq mi)
- Time zone: UTC+01:00 (CET)
  - Summer (DST): UTC+02:00 (CEST)
- INSEE/Postal code: 30289 /30610
- ^{1} French Land Register data, which excludes lakes, ponds, glaciers > 1 km^{2} (0.386 sq mi or 247 acres) and river estuaries.

Saint-Nazaire-des-Gardies is a commune in the Gard department in southern France.

== Population ==
Historical population
Year	Pop.	±% p.a.
1968	100	—
1975	71	−4.77%
1982	77	+1.17%
1990	64	−2.29%
1999	80	+2.51%
2007	79	−0.16%
2012	80	+0.25%
2017	83	+0.74%
2023	80	−0.61%
Source: INSEE

== See also ==
- Communes of the Gard department
