= Moussac, Gard =

Moussac
- Commune
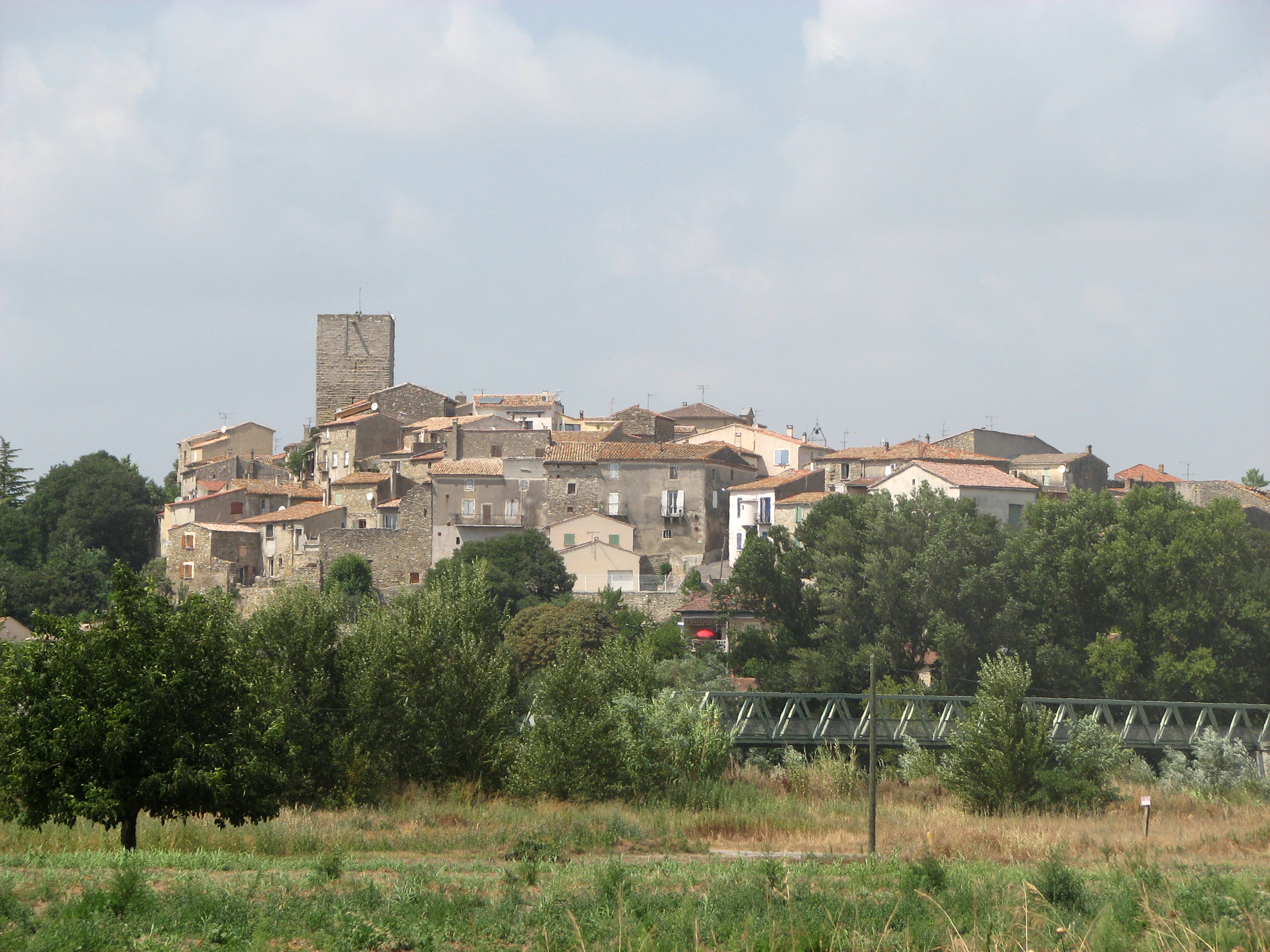
- A general view of Moussac

- Coat of arms
- Location of Moussac
- Location within France Location within Occitanie
- Coordinates: 43°58′55″N 4°13′48″E
- Country: France
- Region: Occitania
- Department: Gard
- Arrondissement: Nîmes
- Canton: Quissac

Government
  - Mayor (2020–2026): Frédéric Salle-Lagarde
- Area^{1}: 7.4 km^{2} (2.9 sq mi)
- Elevation: 78 m (256 ft)
- Highest elevation: 151 m (495 ft)
- Lowest elevation: 64 m (210 ft)
- Population (2023): 1,564
  - Density: 210/km^{2} (550/sq mi)
- Time zone: UTC+01:00 (CET)
  - Summer (DST): UTC+02:00 (CEST)
- INSEE/Postal code: 30184 /30190
- ^{1} French Land Register data, which excludes lakes, ponds, glaciers > 1 km^{2} (0.386 sq mi or 247 acres) and river estuaries.

Moussac (French pronunciation: [musak]; Occitan: Moçac) is a commune in the Gard department in southern France.

== Population ==
Historical population
Year	Pop.	±% p.a.
1968	816	—
1975	864	+0.82%
1982	953	+1.41%
1990	966	+0.17%
1999	1,020	+0.61%
2007	1,165	+1.68%
2012	1,306	+2.31%
2017	1,485	+2.60%
2023	1,564	+0.87%
Source: INSEE

== See also ==
- Communes of the Gard department
