= Aigremont, Gard =

Commune in Occitanie, France

Aigremont
- Commune
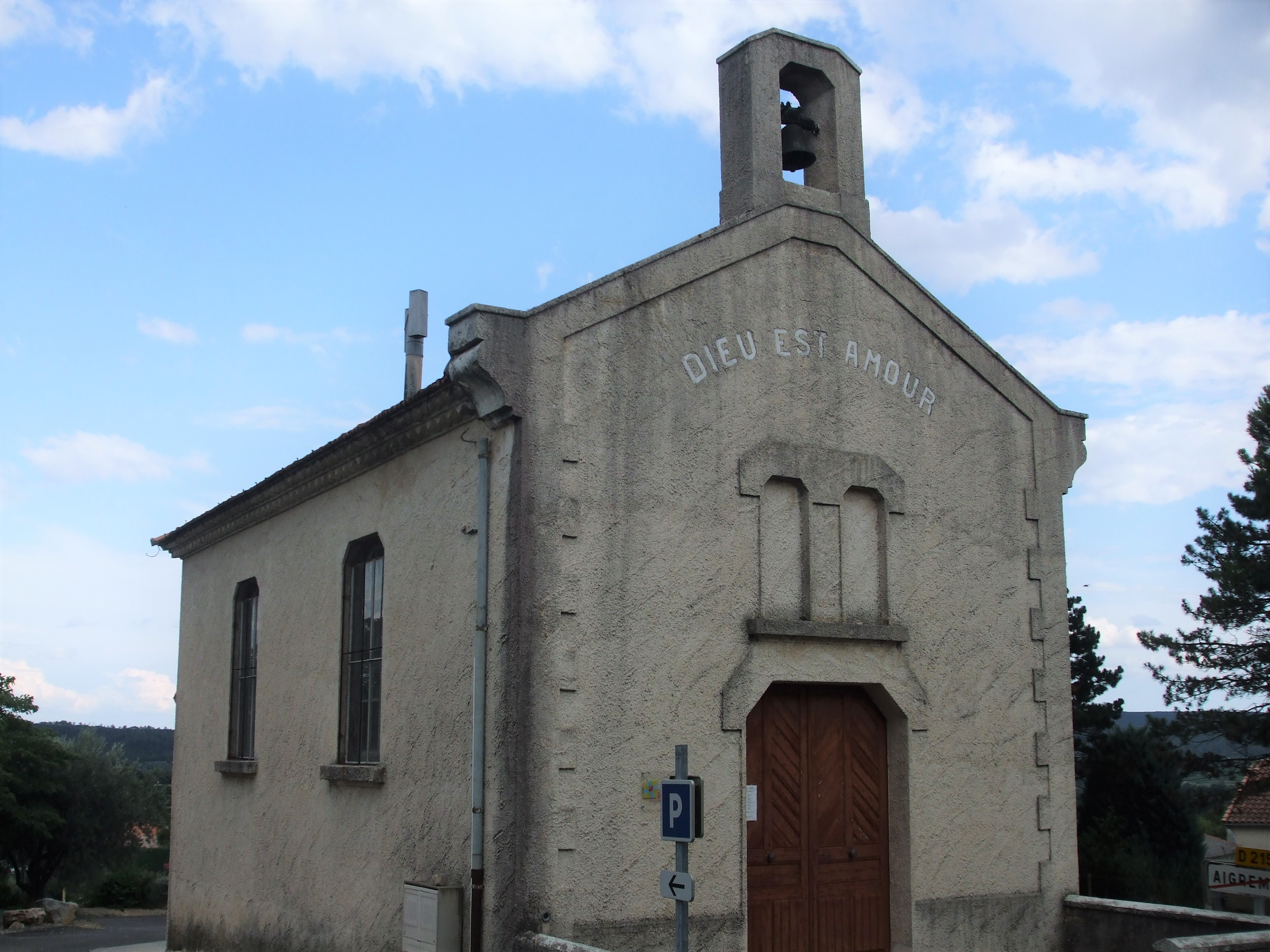
- Protestant temple of Aigremont

- Coat of arms
- Location of Aigremont
- Location within France Location within Occitanie
- Coordinates: 43°58′01″N 4°07′24″E
- Country: France
- Region: Occitania
- Department: Gard
- Arrondissement: Le Vigan
- Canton: Quissac
- Intercommunality: Piémont Cévenol

Government
  - Mayor (2020–2026): Gilles Trinquier
- Area^{1}: 12.55 km^{2} (4.85 sq mi)
- Elevation: 140 m (460 ft)
- Highest elevation: 160 m (520 ft)
- Lowest elevation: 78 m (256 ft)
- Population (2023): 782
  - Density: 62.3/km^{2} (161/sq mi)
- Time zone: UTC+01:00 (CET)
  - Summer (DST): UTC+02:00 (CEST)
- INSEE/Postal code: 30002 /30350
- ^{1} French Land Register data, which excludes lakes, ponds, glaciers > 1 km^{2} (0.386 sq mi or 247 acres) and river estuaries.

Aigremont (French pronunciation: [ɛɡʁəmɔ̃]) is a commune in the Gard department in southern France.

== Population ==
Historical population
Year	Pop.	±% p.a.
1968	256	—
1975	241	−0.86%
1982	243	+0.12%
1990	313	+3.21%
1999	449	+4.09%
2007	668	+5.09%
2012	672	+0.12%
2017	791	+3.31%
2023	782	−0.19%
Source: INSEE

== See also ==
- Communes of the Gard department
