= Saint-Bénézet =

- Commune
- Coat of arms
- Location of Saint-Bénézet
- Location within France Location within Occitanie
- Coordinates: 43°59′39″N 4°08′12″E
- Country: France
- Region: Occitania
- Department: Gard
- Arrondissement: Le Vigan
- Canton: Quissac

Government
  - Mayor (2020–2026): Jérôme Baron
- Area^{1}: 6.3 km^{2} (2.4 sq mi)
- Elevation: 98 m (322 ft)
- Highest elevation: 221 m (725 ft)
- Lowest elevation: 109 m (358 ft)
- Population (2023): 290
  - Density: 46/km^{2} (120/sq mi)
- Time zone: UTC+01:00 (CET)
  - Summer (DST): UTC+02:00 (CEST)
- INSEE/Postal code: 30234 /30350
- ^{1} French Land Register data, which excludes lakes, ponds, glaciers > 1 km^{2} (0.386 sq mi or 247 acres) and river estuaries.

Saint-Bénézet (French pronunciation: [sɛ̃ benezɛ]; Provençal: Sent Beneset) is a commune in the Gard department in southern France.

== Population ==
Historical population
Year	Pop.	±% p.a.
1968	95	—
1975	94	−0.15%
1982	124	+4.04%
1990	175	+4.40%
1999	222	+2.68%
2007	265	+2.24%
2012	281	+1.18%
2017	274	−0.50%
2023	290	+0.95%
Source: INSEE

== See also ==
- Communes of the Gard department
