= Junas =

Junas may refer to:

== People ==
- Daniel Junas (born 1962), Slovak actor
- Junas Naciri (born 1973), Dutch football player
- Martin Junas (born 1996), Slovak football player
- Peter Junas, Slovak ice hockey player

== Places ==
- Junas, Gard, France
