= Montpezat =

Montpezat is the name or part of the name of several communes in France:

- Monpezat, commune in the Pyrénées-Atlantiques département
- Montpezat, Gard, in the Gard département
- Montpezat, Gers, Montpézat, in the Gers département
- Montpezat, Lot-et-Garonne, in the Lot-et-Garonne département
- Montpezat, former commune of the Alpes-de-Haute-Provence which merged with Montagnac to form Montagnac-Montpezat in January 1974
- Montpezat, former commune of the Gironde département, now part of Mourens
- Montpezat-de-Quercy, in the Tarn-et-Garonne département
- Montpezat-sous-Bauzon, in the Ardèche département
