= Jean-Charles Canetti =

Italian-born French footballer (1945–2025)

Personal information
- Date of birth: 15 June 1945
- Place of birth: Udine, Italy
- Date of death: 7 February 2025 (aged 79)
- Place of death: Parignargues, France
- Height: 1.72 m (5 ft 8 in)
- Position: Defender

Senior career*
Years	Team	Apps	(Gls)
1963–1972	Nîmes	193	(13)
1972–1974	Arles	74	(9)
1976–1981	Olympique Alès	99	(8)
- * Club domestic league appearances and goals

Jean-Charles Canetti (15 June 1945 – 7 February 2025) was an Italian footballer who played as a defender.

Canetti played for three clubs throughout his career: Nîmes, Arles, and Olympique Alès. He died in Parignargues on 7 February 2025, at the age of 79.
