= Sauzet =

Sauzet is the name of several communes in France:

- Sauzet, in the Drôme department
- Sauzet, in the Gard department
- Sauzet, in the Lot department
