= Communauté d'agglomération Nîmes Métropole =

Coordinates: 43.84°N 4.36°E

Nîmes Métropole
- Communauté d'agglomération
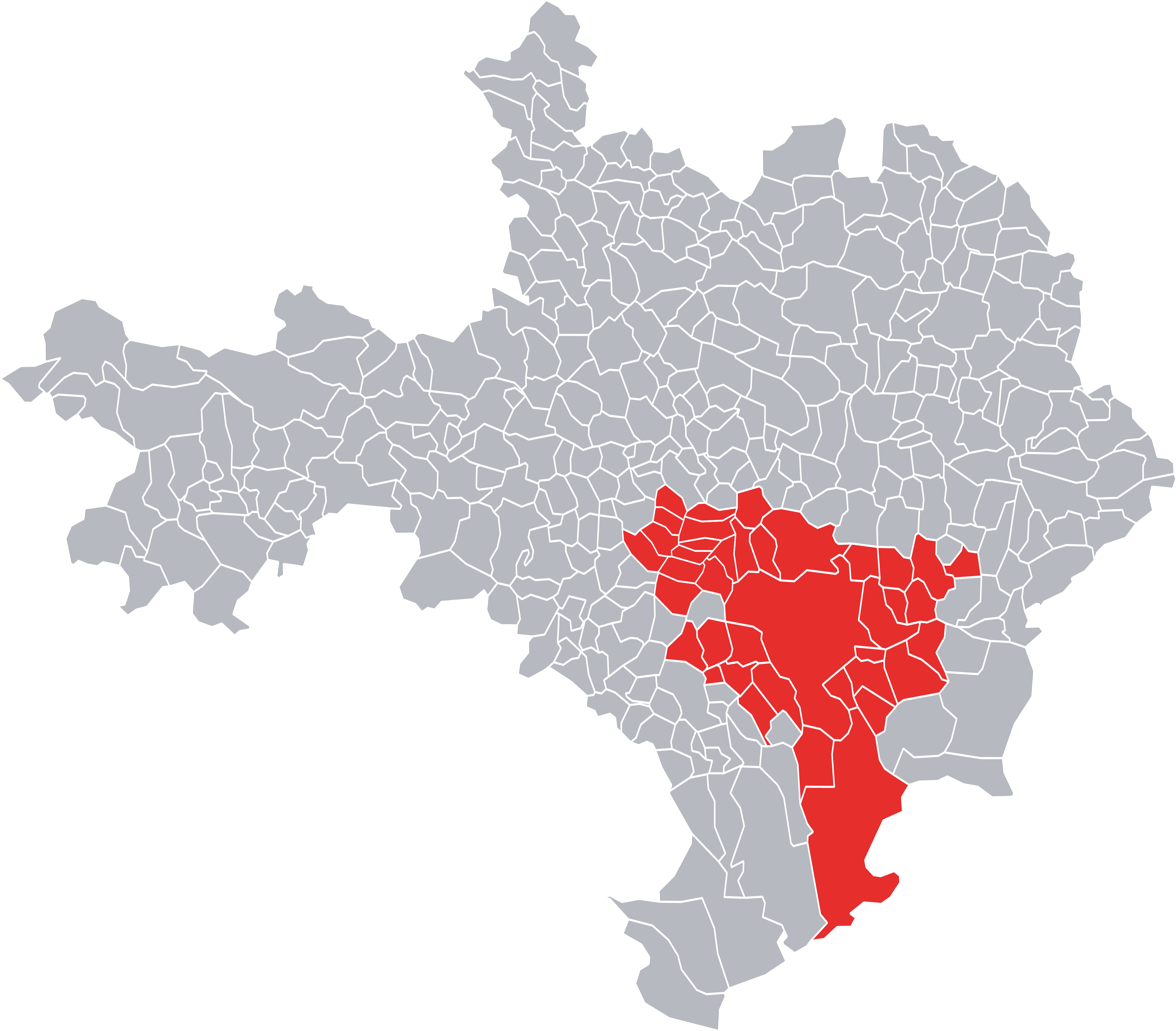
- Location in the Gard.
- Country: France
- Region: Occitania
- Department: Gard
- No. of communes: {{{nbcomm}}}
- Established: 2002
- Area: 790.9 km^{2} (305.4 sq mi)
- Population (2018): 257,987
  - Density: 326.2/km^{2} (844.8/sq mi)
- Website: www.nimes-metropole.fr

Communauté d'agglomération Nîmes Métropole is the communauté d'agglomération, an intercommunal structure, centred on the city of Nîmes. It is located in the Gard department, in the Occitanie region, southern France. It was created in January 2002. Its area is 790.9 km^{2}. Its population was 257,987 in 2014, of which 149,633 in Nîmes proper.

== Composition ==
The communauté d'agglomération consists of the following 39 communes:

1. Bernis
2. Bezouce
3. Bouillargues
4. Cabrières
5. Caissargues
6. La Calmette
7. Caveirac
8. Clarensac
9. Dions
10. Domessargues
11. Fons
12. Gajan
13. Garons
14. Générac
15. Langlade
16. Lédenon
17. Manduel
18. Marguerittes
19. Mauressargues
20. Milhaud
21. Montagnac
22. Montignargues
23. Moulézan
24. Nîmes
25. Poulx
26. Redessan
27. Rodilhan
28. La Rouvière
29. Saint-Bauzély
30. Saint-Chaptes
31. Saint-Côme-et-Maruéjols
32. Saint-Dionisy
33. Sainte-Anastasie
34. Saint-Geniès-de-Malgoirès
35. Saint-Gervasy
36. Saint-Gilles
37. Saint-Mamert-du-Gard
38. Sauzet
39. Sernhac
