= Canton of Calvisson =

Canton of France

Coordinates: 43.79°N 4.19°E

The canton of Calvisson is an administrative division of the Gard department, southern France. It was created at the French canton reorganisation which came into effect in March 2015. Its seat is in Calvisson.

It consists of the following communes:

1. Aspères
2. Aujargues
3. Boissières
4. Calvisson
5. Cannes-et-Clairan
6. Combas
7. Congénies
8. Crespian
9. Fons
10. Fontanès
11. Gajan
12. Junas
13. Lecques
14. Montignargues
15. Montmirat
16. Montpezat
17. Nages-et-Solorgues
18. Parignargues
19. La Rouvière
20. Saint-Bauzély
21. Saint-Clément
22. Saint-Geniès-de-Malgoirès
23. Saint-Mamert-du-Gard
24. Salinelles
25. Sauzet
26. Sommières
27. Souvignargues
28. Villevieille
