= Combas =

- Commune
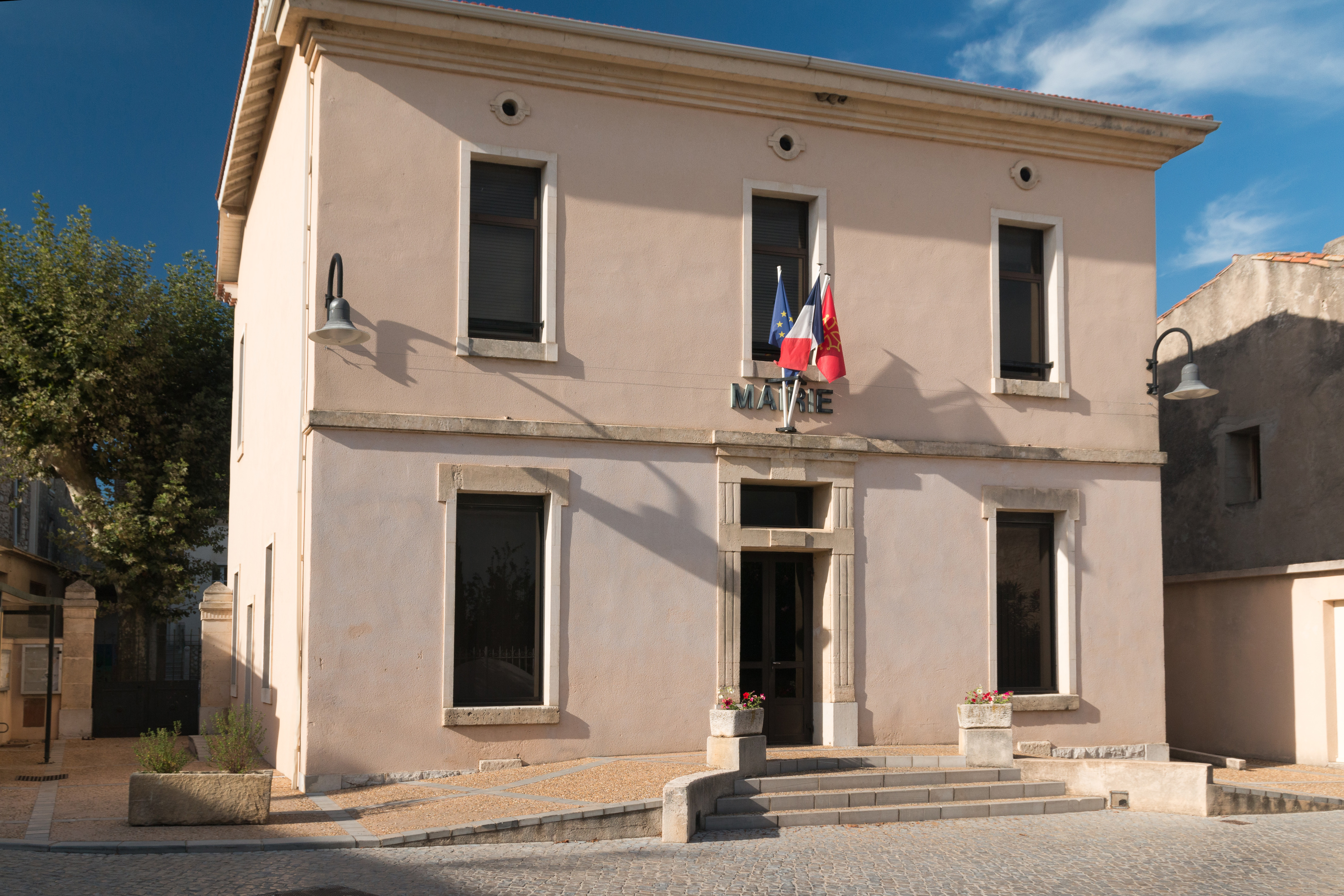
- The town hall of Combas

- Coat of arms
- Location of Combas
- Location within France Location within Occitanie
- Coordinates: 43°51′00″N 4°06′50″E
- Country: France
- Region: Occitania
- Department: Gard
- Arrondissement: Nîmes
- Canton: Calvisson
- Intercommunality: Pays de Sommières

Government
  - Mayor (2020–2026): Michel Debouverie
- Area^{1}: 16.04 km^{2} (6.19 sq mi)
- Elevation: 103 m (338 ft)
- Highest elevation: 274 m (899 ft)
- Lowest elevation: 55 m (180 ft)
- Population (2023): 780
  - Density: 49/km^{2} (130/sq mi)
- Time zone: UTC+01:00 (CET)
  - Summer (DST): UTC+02:00 (CEST)
- INSEE/Postal code: 30088 /30250
- ^{1} French Land Register data, which excludes lakes, ponds, glaciers > 1 km^{2} (0.386 sq mi or 247 acres) and river estuaries.

Combas is a commune in the Gard department in southern France.

== Population ==
Historical population
Year	Pop.	±% p.a.
1968	287	—
1975	313	+1.25%
1982	357	+1.90%
1990	381	+0.82%
1999	433	+1.43%
2007	538	+2.75%
2012	590	+1.86%
2017	628	+1.26%
2023	780	+3.68%
Source: INSEE

== See also ==
- Communes of the Gard department
