= Saint-Mamert-du-Gard =

- Commune
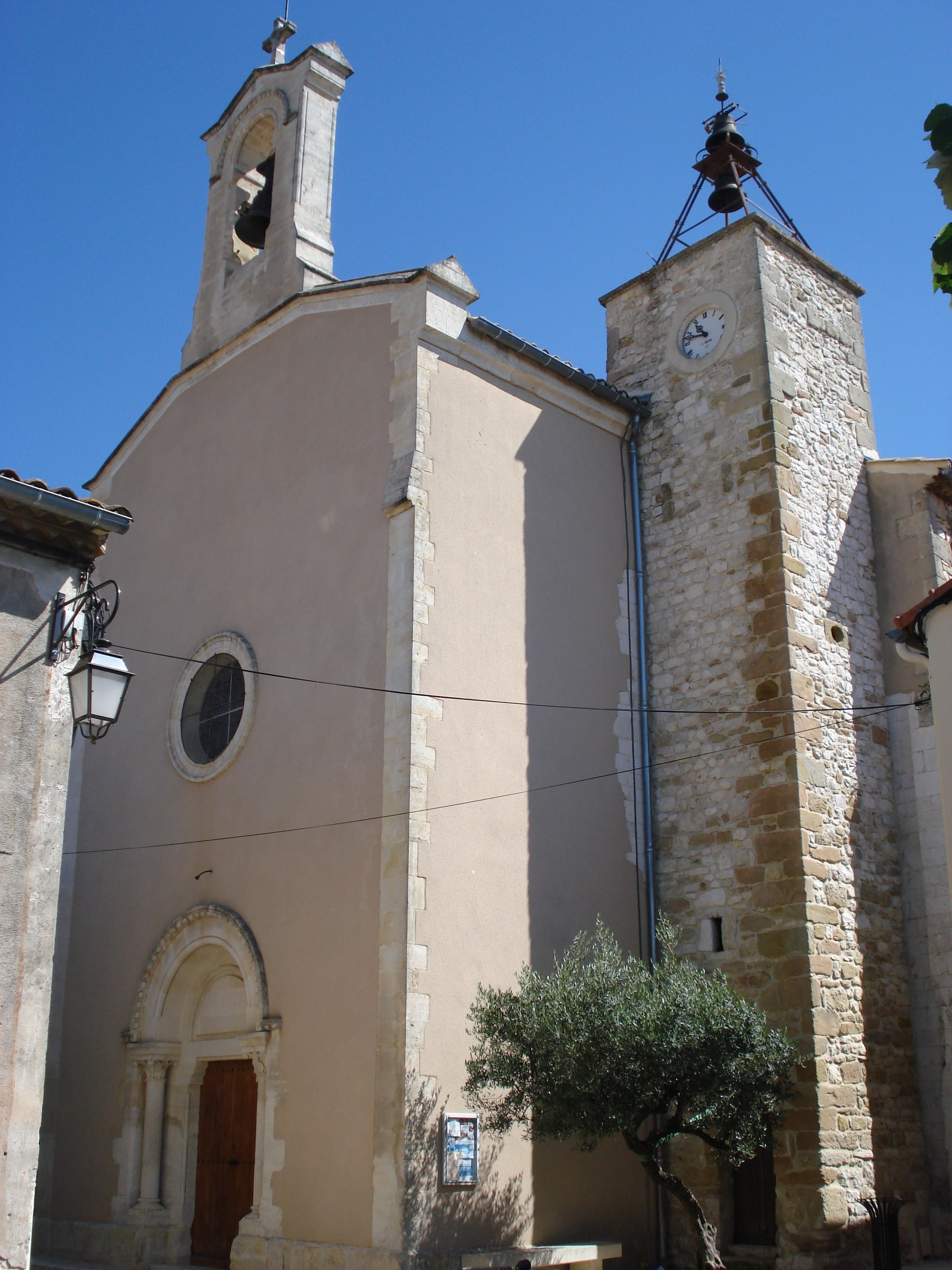
- The church of Saint-Mamert-du-Gard

- Coat of arms
- Location of Saint-Mamert-du-Gard
- Location within France Location within Occitanie
- Coordinates: 43°53′17″N 4°11′21″E
- Country: France
- Region: Occitania
- Department: Gard
- Arrondissement: Nîmes
- Canton: Calvisson
- Intercommunality: CA Nîmes Métropole

Government
  - Mayor (2020–2026): Catherine Bergogne
- Area^{1}: 14.35 km^{2} (5.54 sq mi)
- Elevation: 100 m (330 ft)
- Highest elevation: 214 m (702 ft)
- Lowest elevation: 98 m (322 ft)
- Population (2023): 1,604
  - Density: 111.8/km^{2} (289.5/sq mi)
- Time zone: UTC+01:00 (CET)
  - Summer (DST): UTC+02:00 (CEST)
- INSEE/Postal code: 30281 /30730
- ^{1} French Land Register data, which excludes lakes, ponds, glaciers > 1 km^{2} (0.386 sq mi or 247 acres) and river estuaries.

Saint-Mamert-du-Gard (French pronunciation: [sɛ̃ mamɛʁ dy ɡaʁ]; Occitan: Sant Mamert del Jardin) is a commune in the Gard department, region of Occitania, southern France.

== Population ==
Historical population
Year	Pop.	±% p.a.
1968	413	—
1975	385	−1.00%
1982	655	+7.89%
1990	887	+3.86%
1999	1,100	+2.42%
2007	1,284	+1.95%
2012	1,566	+4.05%
2017	1,634	+0.85%
2023	1,604	−0.31%
Source: INSEE

== See also ==
- Communes of the Gard department
