= Aspères =

Commune in Occitanie, France

Aspères en Languedoc
- Commune
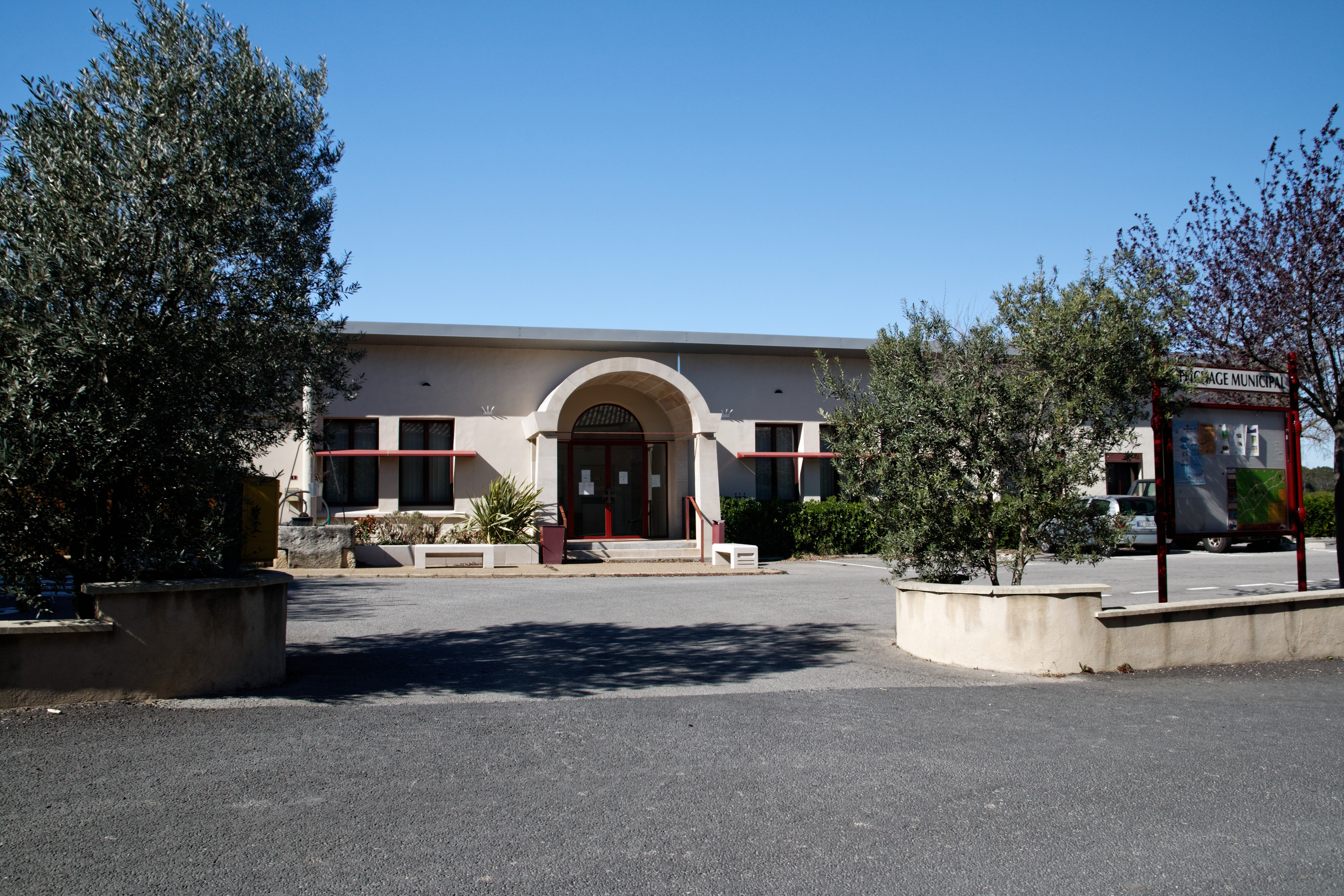
- Town hall
- Location of Aspères en Languedoc
- Location within France Location within Occitanie
- Coordinates: 43°48′33″N 4°02′25″E
- Country: France
- Region: Occitania
- Department: Gard
- Arrondissement: Nîmes
- Canton: Calvisson
- Intercommunality: CC Pays de Sommières

Government
  - Mayor (2020–2026): Jean-Michel Teulade
- Area^{1}: 10.06 km^{2} (3.88 sq mi)
- Elevation: 74 m (243 ft)
- Highest elevation: 243 m (797 ft)
- Lowest elevation: 32 m (105 ft)
- Population (2023): 563
  - Density: 56.0/km^{2} (145/sq mi)
- Time zone: UTC+01:00 (CET)
  - Summer (DST): UTC+02:00 (CEST)
- INSEE/Postal code: 30018 /30250
- ^{1} French Land Register data, which excludes lakes, ponds, glaciers > 1 km^{2} (0.386 sq mi or 247 acres) and river estuaries.

Aspères (French pronunciation: [aspɛʁ]; Occitan: Aspèras) is a commune in the Gard department in southern France.

== Population ==
Historical population
Year	Pop.	±% p.a.
1968	246	—
1975	231	−0.89%
1982	249	+1.08%
1990	289	+1.88%
1999	347	+2.05%
2007	451	+3.33%
2012	518	+2.81%
2017	512	−0.23%
2023	563	+1.60%
Source: INSEE

== See also ==
- Communes of the Gard department
