= Monpezat =

- Commune
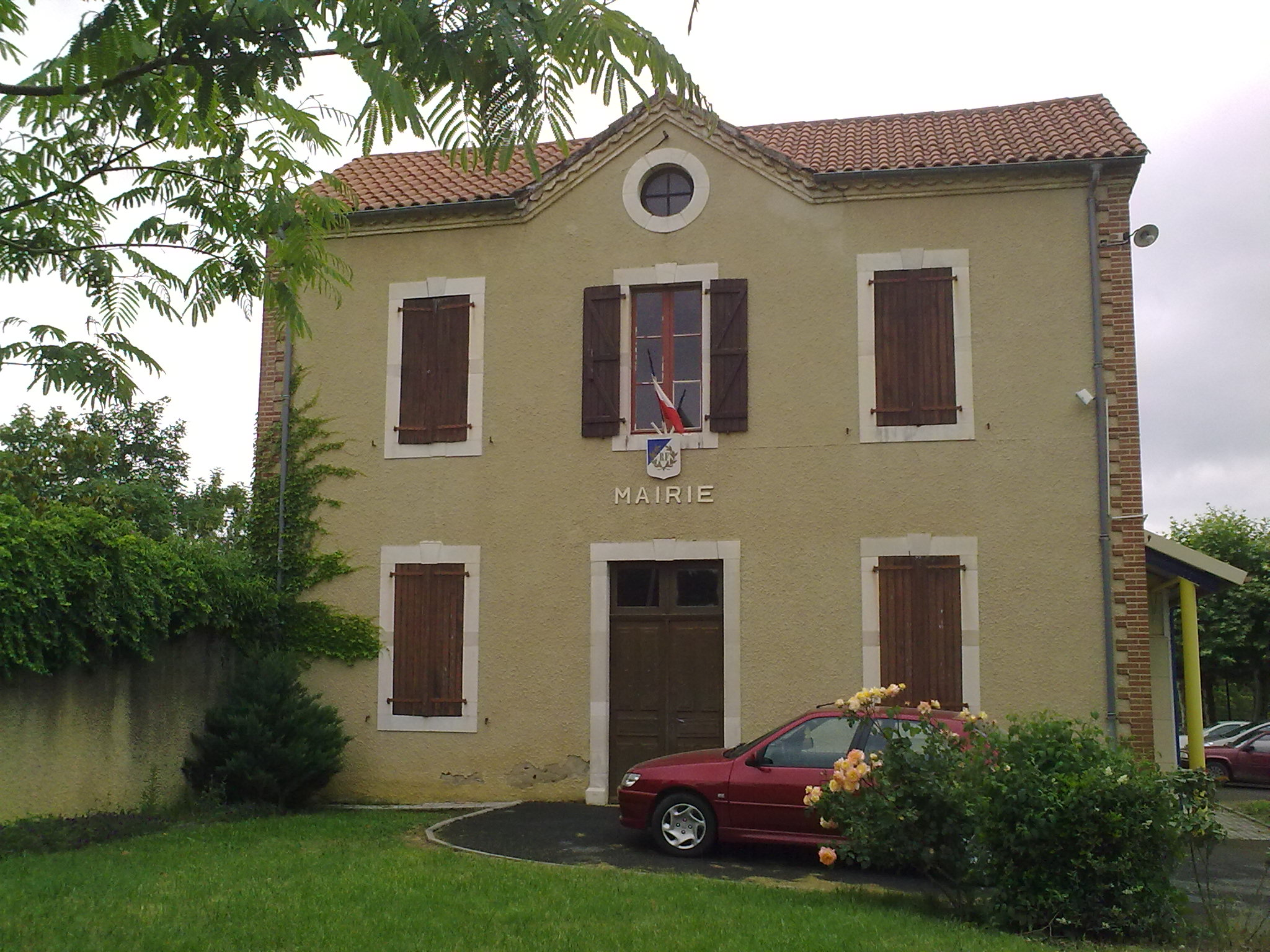
- The town hall of Monpezat
- Location of Monpezat
- Location within France Location within Nouvelle-Aquitaine
- Coordinates: 43°30′11″N 0°03′59″W
- Country: France
- Region: Nouvelle-Aquitaine
- Department: Pyrénées-Atlantiques
- Arrondissement: Pau
- Canton: Terres des Luys et Coteaux du Vic-Bilh

Government
  - Mayor (2020–2026): Annick Carpentier Champroux
- Area^{1}: 3 km^{2} (1.2 sq mi)
- Elevation: 225 m (738 ft)
- Highest elevation: 262 m (860 ft)
- Lowest elevation: 168 m (551 ft)
- Population (2023): 80
  - Density: 27/km^{2} (69/sq mi)
- Time zone: UTC+01:00 (CET)
  - Summer (DST): UTC+02:00 (CEST)
- INSEE/Postal code: 64394 /64350
- ^{1} French Land Register data, which excludes lakes, ponds, glaciers > 1 km^{2} (0.386 sq mi or 247 acres) and river estuaries.

Monpezat (French pronunciation: [mɔ̃pəza]; Occitan: Montpesat) is a commune in the Pyrénées-Atlantiques department in south-western France.

The Labésiau brook crosses the commune, on its way to the river Gabas.

== See also ==
- Communes of the Pyrénées-Atlantiques department
- Montpezat
- de Laborde de Monpezat family
