= Clarensac =

Commune in Occitanie, France

- Commune
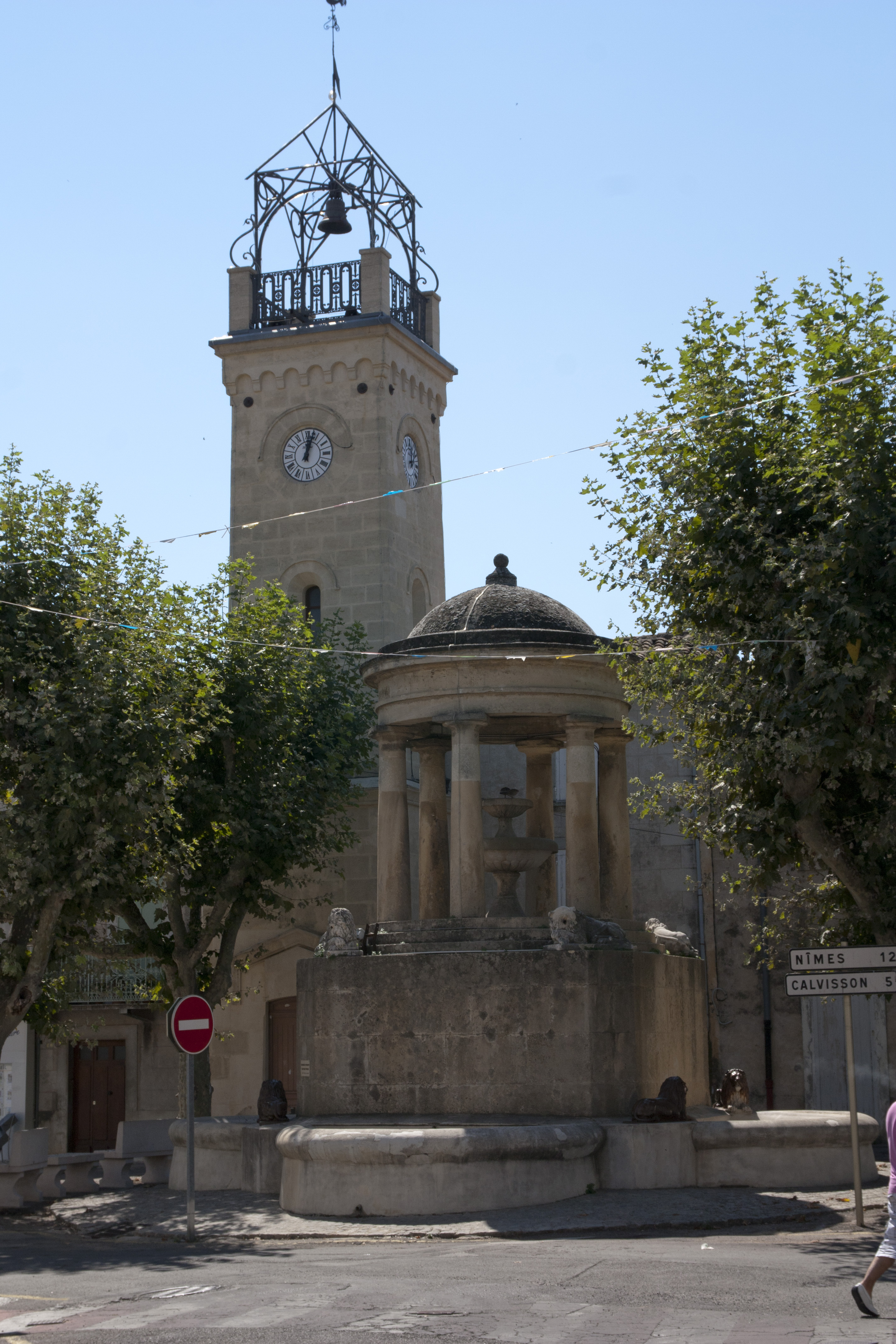
- The clock tower in Clarensac

- Coat of arms
- Location of Clarensac
- Location within France Location within Occitanie
- Coordinates: 43°49′40″N 4°13′08″E
- Country: France
- Region: Occitania
- Department: Gard
- Arrondissement: Nîmes
- Canton: Saint-Gilles
- Intercommunality: CA Nîmes Métropole

Government
  - Mayor (2020–2026): Patrick Gervais
- Area^{1}: 14.49 km^{2} (5.59 sq mi)
- Elevation: 72 m (236 ft)
- Highest elevation: 212 m (696 ft)
- Lowest elevation: 42 m (138 ft)
- Population (2023): 4,386
  - Density: 302.7/km^{2} (784.0/sq mi)
- Time zone: UTC+01:00 (CET)
  - Summer (DST): UTC+02:00 (CEST)
- INSEE/Postal code: 30082 /30870
- ^{1} French Land Register data, which excludes lakes, ponds, glaciers > 1 km^{2} (0.386 sq mi or 247 acres) and river estuaries.

Clarensac (French pronunciation: [klaʁɑ̃sak]; Occitan: Clarençac) is a commune in the Gard department in southern France.

== Population ==
Historical population
Year	Pop.	±% p.a.
1968	532	—
1975	727	+4.56%
1982	1,597	+11.90%
1990	2,208	+4.13%
1999	2,654	+2.07%
2007	3,504	+3.53%
2012	4,037	+2.87%
2017	4,263	+1.10%
2023	4,386	+0.48%
Source: INSEE

== See also ==
- Communes of the Gard department
