= Saint-Geniès-de-Malgoirès =

Saint-Géniès-de-Malgoirès
- Commune
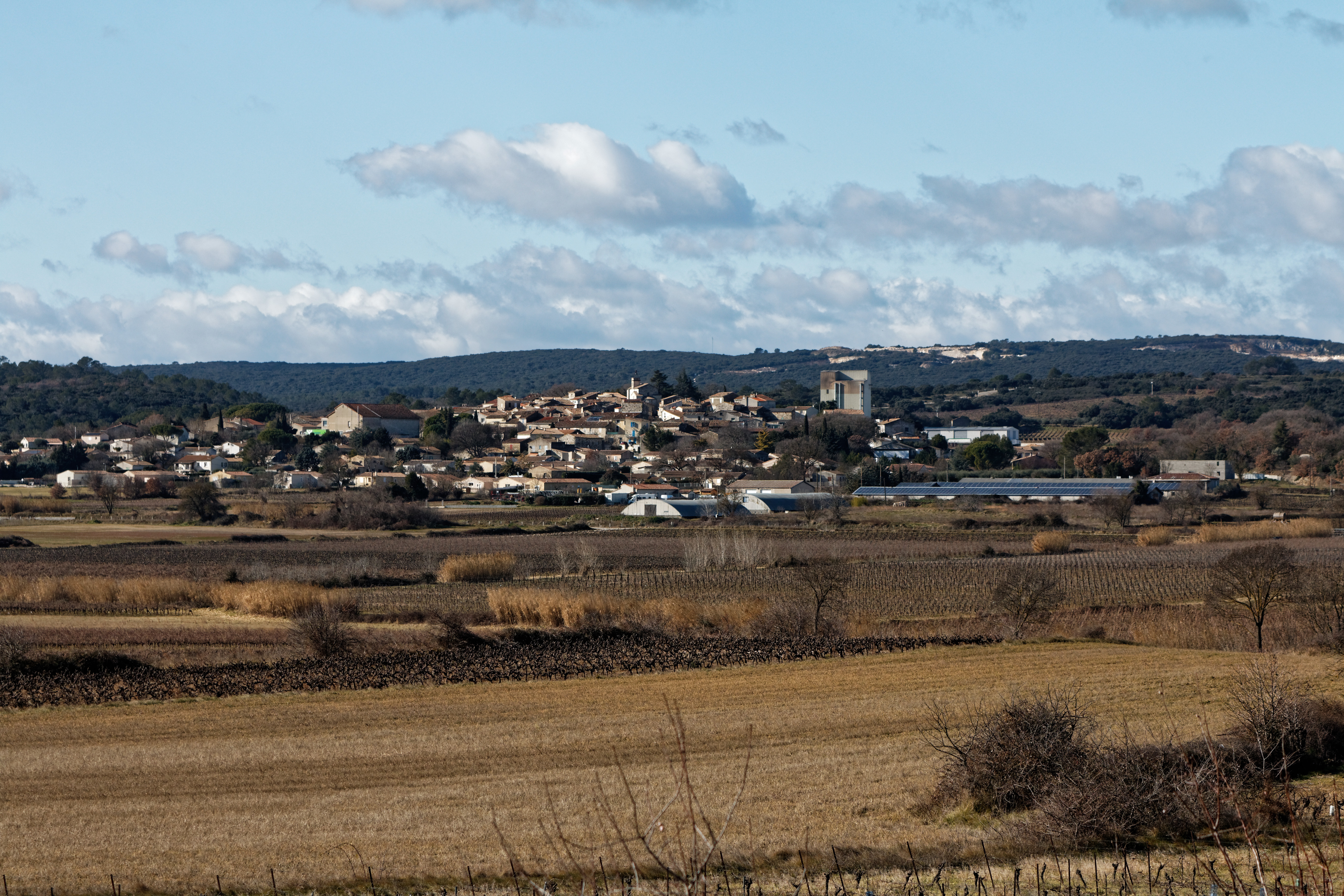

- Coat of arms
- Location of Saint-Géniès-de-Malgoirès
- Location within France Location within Occitanie
- Coordinates: 43°56′47″N 4°13′02″E
- Country: France
- Region: Occitania
- Department: Gard
- Arrondissement: Nîmes
- Canton: Calvisson
- Intercommunality: CA Nîmes Métropole

Government
  - Mayor (2020–2026): Jean-François Durand-Coutelle
- Area^{1}: 11.54 km^{2} (4.46 sq mi)
- Elevation: 88 m (289 ft)
- Highest elevation: 223 m (732 ft)
- Lowest elevation: 64 m (210 ft)
- Population (2023): 3,225
  - Density: 279.5/km^{2} (723.8/sq mi)
- Time zone: UTC+01:00 (CET)
  - Summer (DST): UTC+02:00 (CEST)
- INSEE/Postal code: 30255 /30190
- ^{1} French Land Register data, which excludes lakes, ponds, glaciers > 1 km^{2} (0.386 sq mi or 247 acres) and river estuaries.

Saint-Geniès-de-Malgoirès (French pronunciation: [sɛ̃ ʒənjɛs də malɡwaʁɛs]; Occitan: Sent Ginièis de Malgoiriés) is a commune in the Gard department in southern France.

== Population ==
Historical population
Year	Pop.	±% p.a.
1968	1,084	—
1975	1,155	+0.91%
1982	1,252	+1.16%
1990	1,696	+3.87%
1999	1,853	+0.99%
2007	2,546	+4.05%
2012	2,932	+2.86%
2017	3,007	+0.51%
2023	3,225	+1.17%
Source: INSEE

== See also ==
- Communes of the Gard department
