= Montignargues =

- Commune
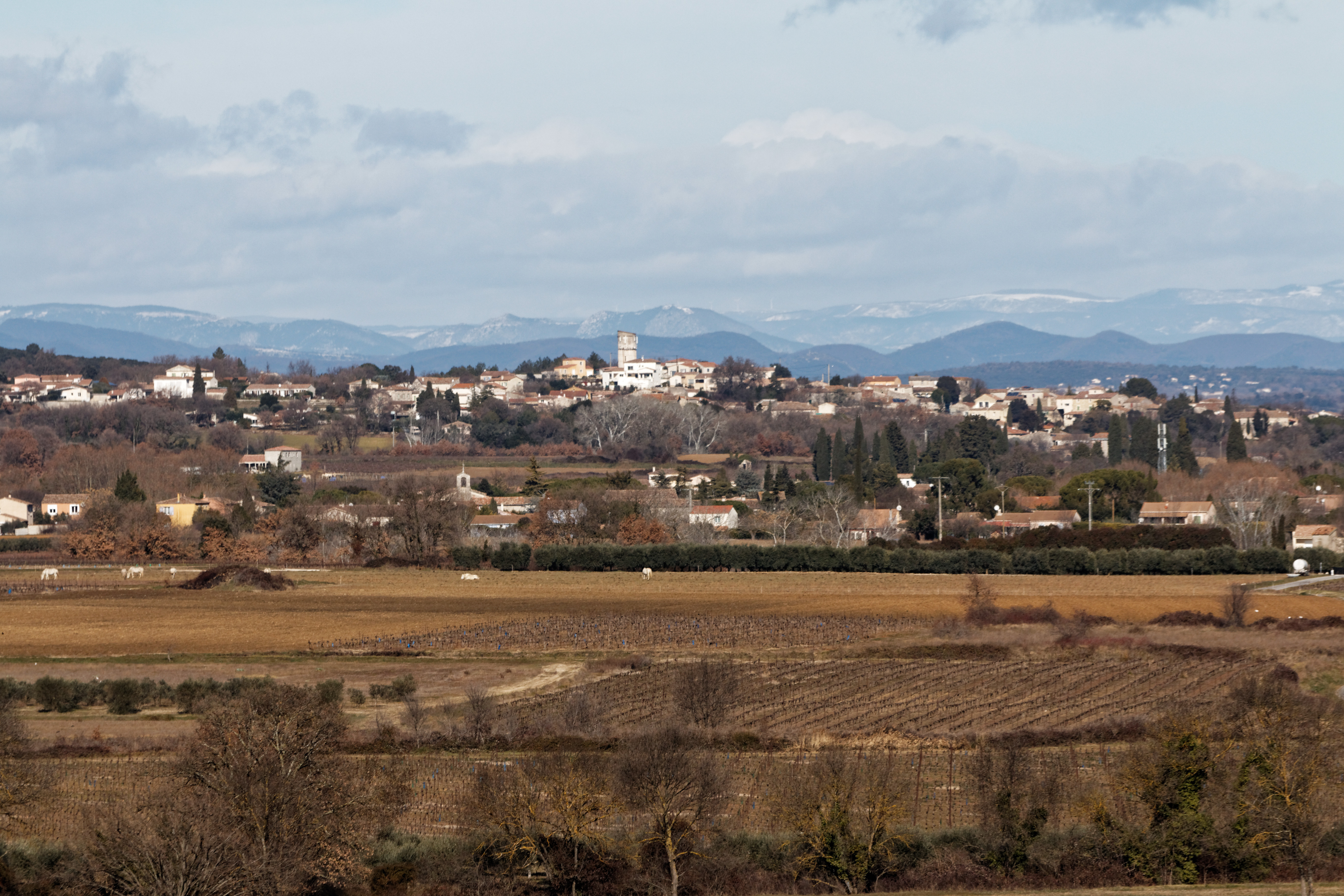
- Location of Montignargues
- Location within France Location within Occitanie
- Coordinates: 43°55′55″N 4°11′57″E
- Country: France
- Region: Occitania
- Department: Gard
- Arrondissement: Nîmes
- Canton: Calvisson
- Intercommunality: CA Nîmes Métropole

Government
  - Mayor (2020–2026): Véronique Poignet-Senger
- Area^{1}: 4.46 km^{2} (1.72 sq mi)
- Elevation: 145 m (476 ft)
- Highest elevation: 202 m (663 ft)
- Lowest elevation: 79 m (259 ft)
- Population (2023): 556
  - Density: 125/km^{2} (323/sq mi)
- Time zone: UTC+01:00 (CET)
  - Summer (DST): UTC+02:00 (CEST)
- INSEE/Postal code: 30180 /30190
- ^{1} French Land Register data, which excludes lakes, ponds, glaciers > 1 km^{2} (0.386 sq mi or 247 acres) and river estuaries.

Montignargues (French pronunciation: [mɔ̃tiɲaʁɡ]; Occitan: Montinhargues) is a commune in the Gard department in southern France.

== Population ==
Historical population
Year	Pop.	±% p.a.
1968	91	—
1975	98	+1.06%
1982	180	+9.07%
1990	205	+1.64%
1999	348	+6.06%
2007	584	+6.69%
2012	630	+1.53%
2017	597	−1.07%
2023	556	−1.18%
Source: INSEE

== See also ==
- Communes of the Gard department
