= Saint-Clément, Gard =

Saint-Clément
- Commune
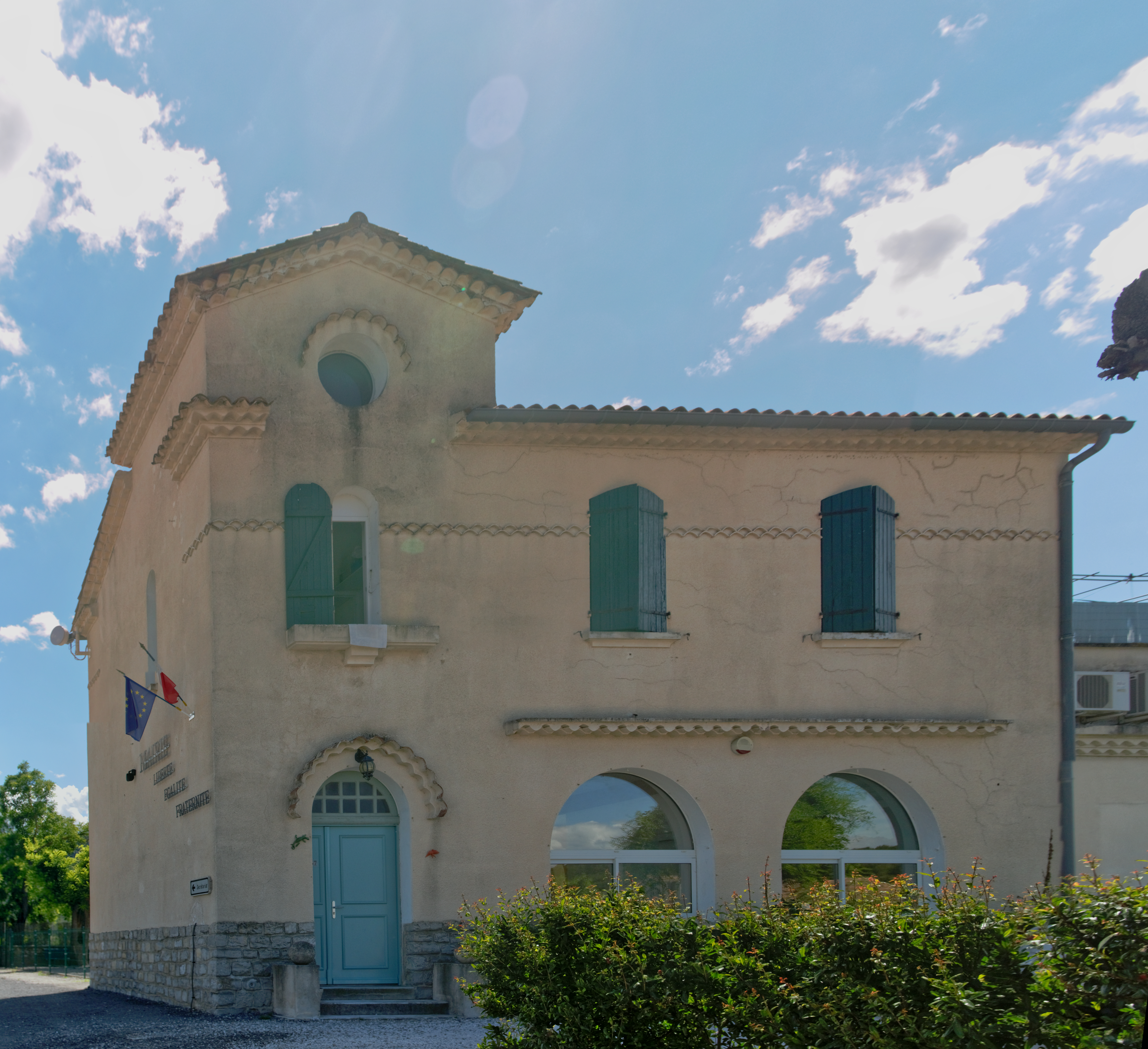
- Town hall

- Coat of arms
- Location of Saint-Clément
- Location within France Location within Occitanie
- Coordinates: 43°49′53″N 4°01′40″E
- Country: France
- Region: Occitania
- Department: Gard
- Arrondissement: Nîmes
- Canton: Calvisson
- Intercommunality: Pays de Sommières

Government
  - Mayor (2020–2026): Sylvain Renner
- Area^{1}: 5.04 km^{2} (1.95 sq mi)
- Elevation: 51 m (167 ft)
- Highest elevation: 238 m (781 ft)
- Lowest elevation: 40 m (130 ft)
- Population (2023): 364
  - Density: 72.2/km^{2} (187/sq mi)
- Time zone: UTC+01:00 (CET)
  - Summer (DST): UTC+02:00 (CEST)
- INSEE/Postal code: 30244 /30260
- ^{1} French Land Register data, which excludes lakes, ponds, glaciers > 1 km^{2} (0.386 sq mi or 247 acres) and river estuaries.

Saint-Clément (French pronunciation: [sɛ̃ klemɑ̃]; Occitan: Sent Clement) is a commune in the Gard department in southern France.

== Population ==
Historical population
Year	Pop.	±% p.a.
1968	150	—
1975	126	−2.46%
1982	113	−1.54%
1990	122	+0.96%
1999	140	+1.54%
2007	253	+7.68%
2012	341	+6.15%
2017	379	+2.14%
2023	364	−0.67%
Source: INSEE

== See also ==
- Communes of the Gard department
