= Salinelles =

- Commune
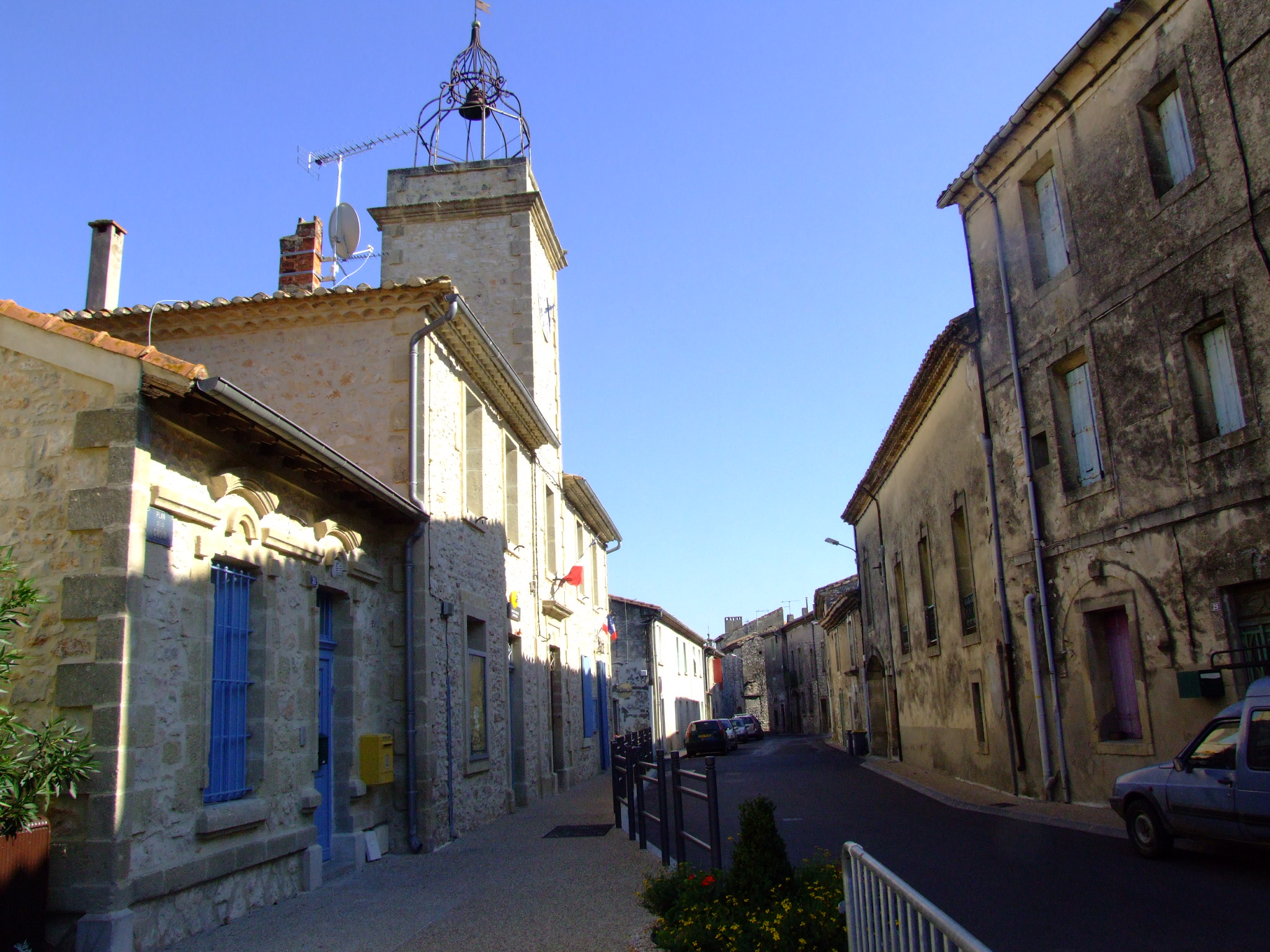
- A view of Salinelles
- Location of Salinelles
- Location within France Location within Occitanie
- Coordinates: 43°48′39″N 4°04′07″E
- Country: France
- Region: Occitania
- Department: Gard
- Arrondissement: Nîmes
- Canton: Calvisson
- Intercommunality: Pays de Sommières

Government
  - Mayor (2020–2026): Marc Larroque
- Area^{1}: 8.84 km^{2} (3.41 sq mi)
- Elevation: 40 m (130 ft)
- Highest elevation: 115 m (377 ft)
- Lowest elevation: 24 m (79 ft)
- Population (2023): 585
  - Density: 66.2/km^{2} (171/sq mi)
- Time zone: UTC+01:00 (CET)
  - Summer (DST): UTC+02:00 (CEST)
- INSEE/Postal code: 30306 /30250
- ^{1} French Land Register data, which excludes lakes, ponds, glaciers > 1 km^{2} (0.386 sq mi or 247 acres) and river estuaries.

Salinelles (French pronunciation: [salinɛl]; Occitan: Salinèla) is a commune in the Gard department in southern France.

== Population ==
Historical population
Year	Pop.	±% p.a.
1968	261	—
1975	232	−1.67%
1982	276	+2.51%
1990	355	+3.20%
1999	418	+1.83%
2007	465	+1.34%
2012	528	+2.57%
2017	573	+1.65%
2023	585	+0.35%
Source: INSEE

== See also ==
- Communes of the Gard department
