= Cannes-et-Clairan =

Commune in Occitanie, France

- Commune
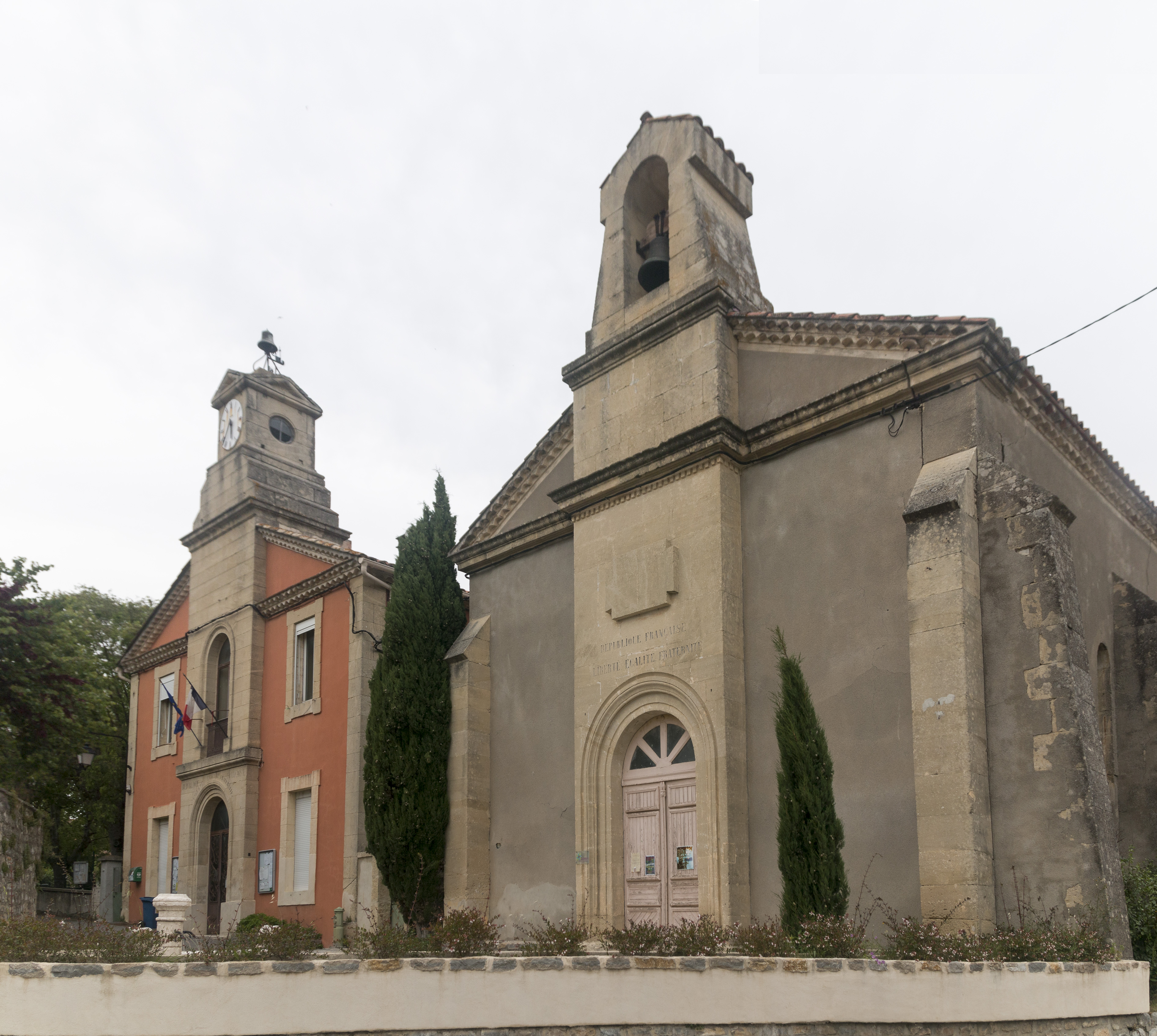
- The town hall of Cannes-et-Clairan

- Coat of arms
- Location of Cannes-et-Clairan
- Location within France Location within Occitanie
- Coordinates: 43°54′05″N 4°05′06″E
- Country: France
- Region: Occitania
- Department: Gard
- Arrondissement: Nîmes
- Canton: Calvisson

Government
  - Mayor (2023–2026): Sandrine Serret
- Area^{1}: 12.13 km^{2} (4.68 sq mi)
- Elevation: 60 m (200 ft)
- Highest elevation: 219 m (719 ft)
- Lowest elevation: 48 m (157 ft)
- Population (2023): 617
  - Density: 50.9/km^{2} (132/sq mi)
- Time zone: UTC+01:00 (CET)
  - Summer (DST): UTC+02:00 (CEST)
- INSEE/Postal code: 30066 /30260
- ^{1} French Land Register data, which excludes lakes, ponds, glaciers > 1 km^{2} (0.386 sq mi or 247 acres) and river estuaries.

Cannes-et-Clairan (French pronunciation: [kan e klɛʁɑ̃]; Occitan: Canas e Clairan) is a commune in the Gard department in southern France.

== Population ==
Historical population
Year	Pop.	±% p.a.
1968	203	—
1975	174	−2.18%
1982	171	−0.25%
1990	210	+2.60%
1999	309	+4.38%
2007	372	+2.35%
2012	553	+8.25%
2017	540	−0.47%
2023	617	+2.25%
Source: INSEE

== See also ==
- Communes of the Gard department
