= Aujargues =

Commune in Occitanie, France

- Commune
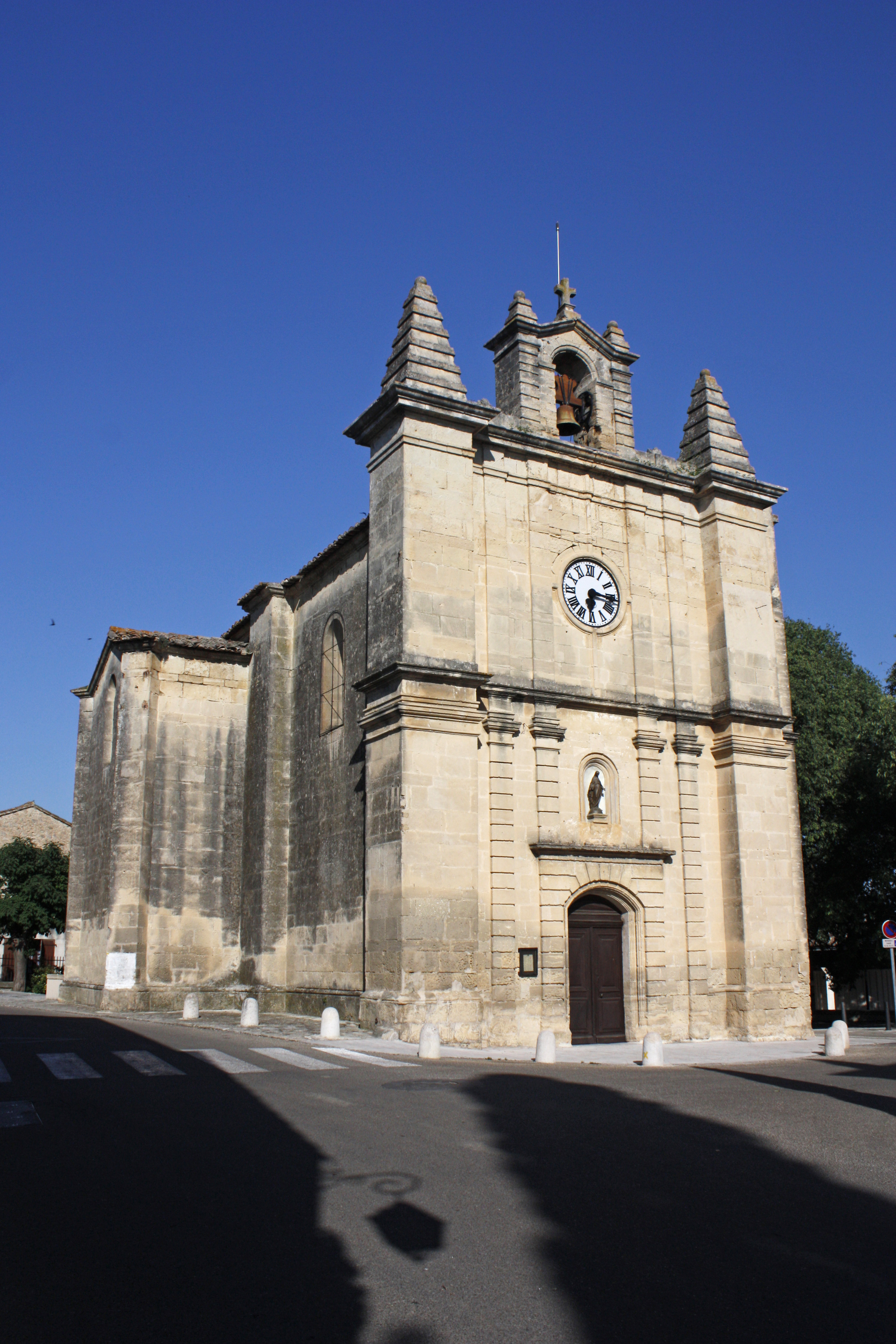
- The church in Aujargues

- Coat of arms
- Location of Aujargues
- Location within France Location within Occitanie
- Coordinates: 43°47′26″N 4°07′25″E
- Country: France
- Region: Occitania
- Department: Gard
- Arrondissement: Nîmes
- Canton: Calvisson
- Intercommunality: CC Pays de Sommières

Government
  - Mayor (2020–2026): Bernard Chluda
- Area^{1}: 6.85 km^{2} (2.64 sq mi)
- Elevation: 70 m (230 ft)
- Highest elevation: 143 m (469 ft)
- Lowest elevation: 50 m (160 ft)
- Population (2023): 815
  - Density: 119/km^{2} (308/sq mi)
- Time zone: UTC+01:00 (CET)
  - Summer (DST): UTC+02:00 (CEST)
- INSEE/Postal code: 30023 /30250
- ^{1} French Land Register data, which excludes lakes, ponds, glaciers > 1 km^{2} (0.386 sq mi or 247 acres) and river estuaries.

Aujargues (French pronunciation: [oʒaʁɡ]; Occitan: Oiargues) is a commune in the Gard department in southern France.

== Population ==
Historical population
Year	Pop.	±% p.a.
1968	232	—
1975	295	+3.49%
1982	366	+3.13%
1990	469	+3.15%
1999	673	+4.09%
2007	800	+2.18%
2012	853	+1.29%
2017	846	−0.16%
2023	815	−0.62%
Source: INSEE

== See also ==
- Communes of the Gard department
