= Sainte-Anastasie, Gard =

Sainte-Anastasie
- Commune
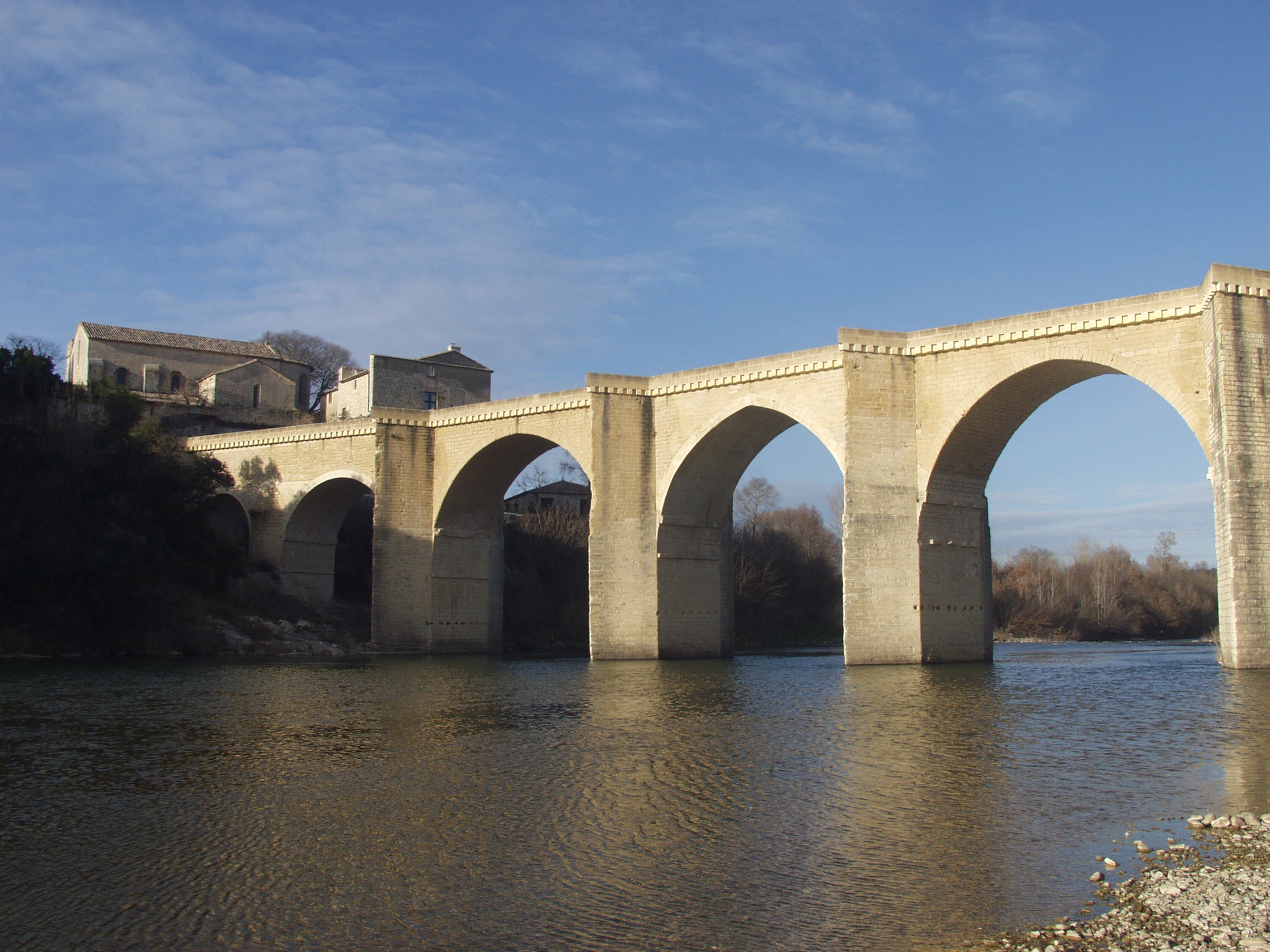
- Saint-Nicolas-de-Campagnac bridge over the Gardon

- Coat of arms
- Location of Sainte-Anastasie
- Location within France Location within Occitanie
- Coordinates: 43°56′10″N 4°19′21″E
- Country: France
- Region: Occitania
- Department: Gard
- Arrondissement: Nîmes
- Canton: Uzès
- Intercommunality: CA Nîmes Métropole

Government
  - Mayor (2020–2026): Gilles Tixador
- Area^{1}: 43.64 km^{2} (16.85 sq mi)
- Elevation: 70 m (230 ft)
- Highest elevation: 207 m (679 ft)
- Lowest elevation: 33 m (108 ft)
- Population (2023): 1,738
  - Density: 39.83/km^{2} (103.1/sq mi)
- Time zone: UTC+01:00 (CET)
  - Summer (DST): UTC+02:00 (CEST)
- INSEE/Postal code: 30228 /30190
- ^{1} French Land Register data, which excludes lakes, ponds, glaciers > 1 km^{2} (0.386 sq mi or 247 acres) and river estuaries.

Sainte-Anastasie (French pronunciation: [sɛ̃t anastazi]; Provençal: Senta Anastasiá) is a commune in the Gard department in southern France.

== Population ==
Historical population
Year	Pop.	±% p.a.
1968	708	—
1975	732	+0.48%
1982	870	+2.50%
1990	1,028	+2.11%
1999	1,270	+2.38%
2007	1,592	+2.86%
2012	1,675	+1.02%
2017	1,686	+0.13%
2023	1,738	+0.51%
Source: INSEE

== Sights ==
- Arboretum Sainte-Anastasie
- Saint-Nicolas-de-Campagnac Bridge

== See also ==
- Communes of the Gard department
