= Gajan, Gard =

Gajan
- Commune
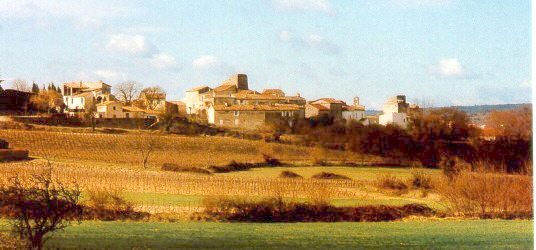
- A general view of Gajan

- Coat of arms
- Location of Gajan
- Location within France Location within Occitanie
- Coordinates: 43°53′52″N 4°12′56″E
- Country: France
- Region: Occitania
- Department: Gard
- Arrondissement: Nîmes
- Canton: Calvisson
- Intercommunality: CA Nîmes Métropole

Government
  - Mayor (2020–2026): Jean-Louis Poudevigne
- Area^{1}: 10.91 km^{2} (4.21 sq mi)
- Elevation: 98 m (322 ft)
- Highest elevation: 165 m (541 ft)
- Lowest elevation: 79 m (259 ft)
- Population (2023): 789
  - Density: 72.3/km^{2} (187/sq mi)
- Time zone: UTC+01:00 (CET)
  - Summer (DST): UTC+02:00 (CEST)
- INSEE/Postal code: 30122 /30730
- ^{1} French Land Register data, which excludes lakes, ponds, glaciers > 1 km^{2} (0.386 sq mi or 247 acres) and river estuaries.

Gajan (French pronunciation: [ɡaʒɑ̃]) is a commune in the Gard department in southern France.

== Population ==
Historical population
Year	Pop.	±% p.a.
1968	247	—
1975	247	+0.00%
1982	314	+3.49%
1990	459	+4.86%
1999	633	+3.64%
2007	685	+0.99%
2012	727	+1.20%
2017	668	−1.68%
2023	789	+2.81%
Source: INSEE

== See also ==
- Communes of the Gard department
