= Montmirat =

- Commune
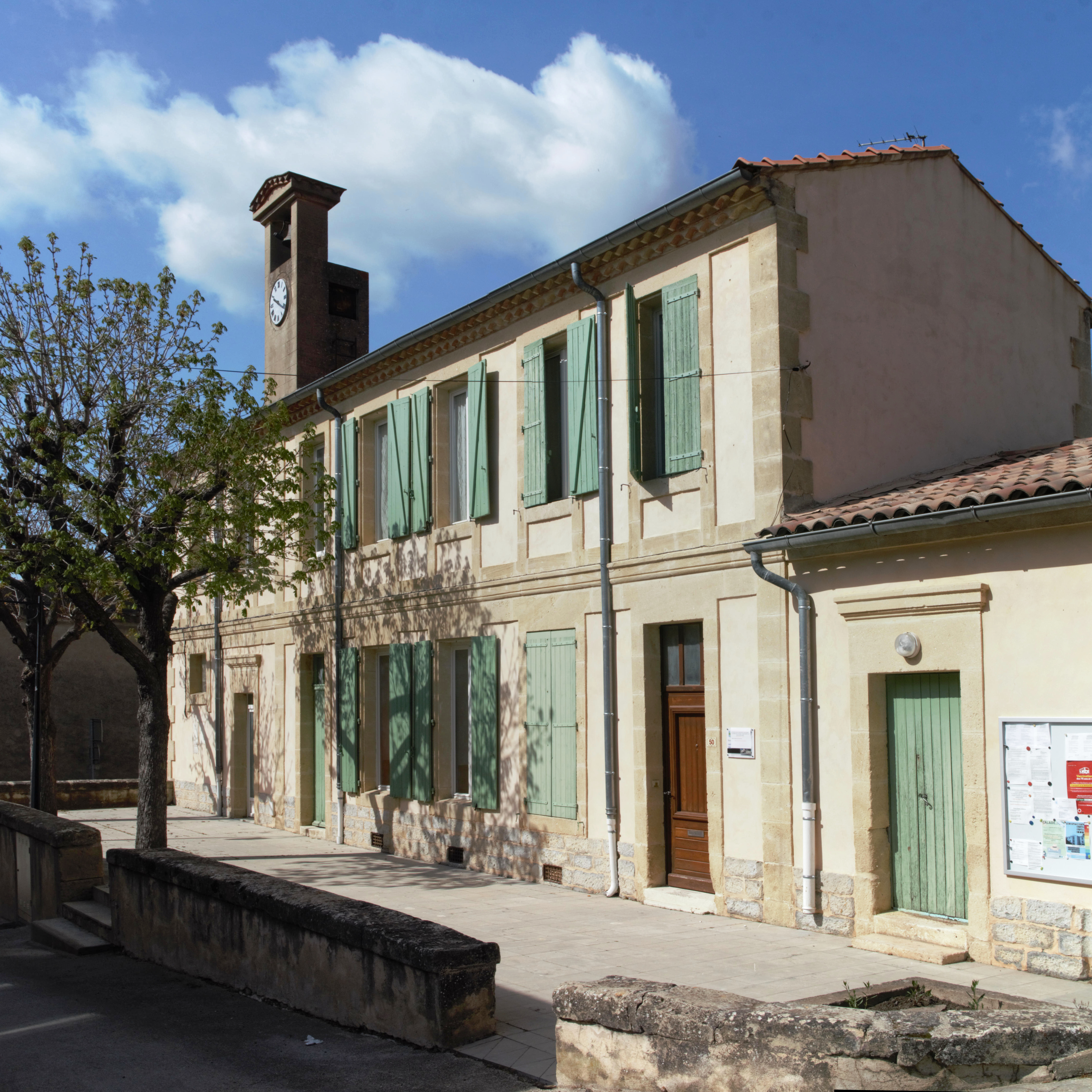
- Town hall

- Coat of arms
- Location of Montmirat
- Location within France Location within Occitanie
- Coordinates: 43°54′06″N 4°06′15″E
- Country: France
- Region: Occitania
- Department: Gard
- Arrondissement: Nîmes
- Canton: Calvisson
- Intercommunality: Pays de Sommières

Government
  - Mayor (2020–2026): François Granier
- Area^{1}: 9.52 km^{2} (3.68 sq mi)
- Elevation: 88 m (289 ft)
- Highest elevation: 270 m (890 ft)
- Lowest elevation: 58 m (190 ft)
- Population (2023): 469
  - Density: 49.3/km^{2} (128/sq mi)
- Time zone: UTC+01:00 (CET)
  - Summer (DST): UTC+02:00 (CEST)
- INSEE/Postal code: 30181 /30260
- ^{1} French Land Register data, which excludes lakes, ponds, glaciers > 1 km^{2} (0.386 sq mi or 247 acres) and river estuaries.

Montmirat (French pronunciation: [mɔ̃miʁa]) is a commune in the Gard department in southern France.

== Population ==
Historical population
Year	Pop.	±% p.a.
1968	161	—
1975	146	−1.39%
1982	135	−1.11%
1990	142	+0.63%
1999	167	+1.82%
2007	276	+6.48%
2012	371	+6.09%
2017	433	+3.14%
2023	469	+1.34%
Source: INSEE

== See also ==
- Communes of the Gard department
