= Montagnac, Gard =

Montagnac
- Commune
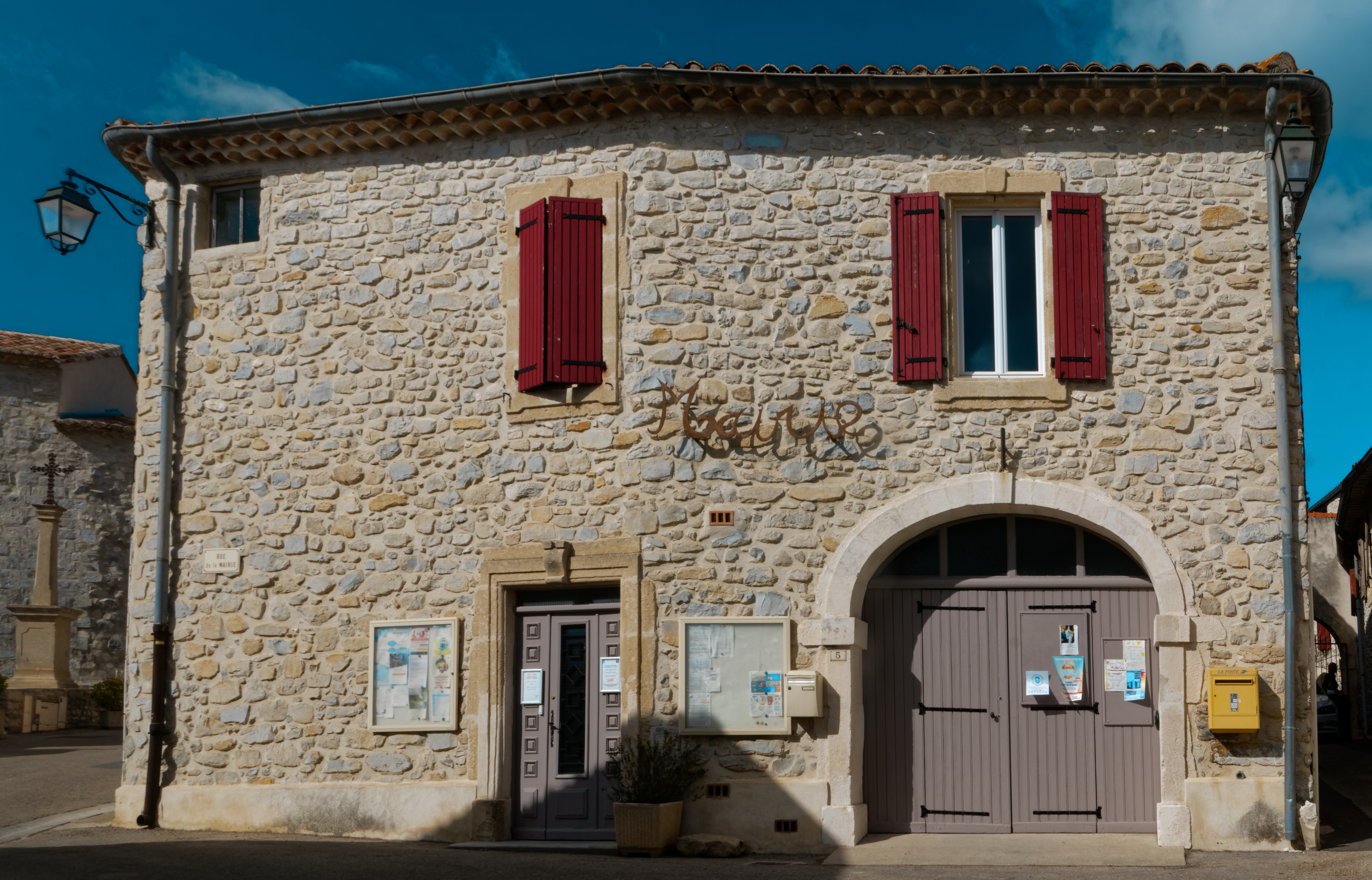
- Town hall

- Coat of arms
- Location of Montagnac
- Location within France Location within Occitanie
- Coordinates: 43°56′17″N 4°08′55″E
- Country: France
- Region: Occitania
- Department: Gard
- Arrondissement: Nîmes
- Canton: Quissac
- Intercommunality: CA Nîmes Métropole

Government
  - Mayor (2020–2026): Daniel Marquet
- Area^{1}: 8.68 km^{2} (3.35 sq mi)
- Elevation: 170 m (560 ft)
- Highest elevation: 282 m (925 ft)
- Lowest elevation: 85 m (279 ft)
- Population (2023): 249
  - Density: 28.7/km^{2} (74.3/sq mi)
- Time zone: UTC+01:00 (CET)
  - Summer (DST): UTC+02:00 (CEST)
- INSEE/Postal code: 30354 /30350
- ^{1} French Land Register data, which excludes lakes, ponds, glaciers > 1 km^{2} (0.386 sq mi or 247 acres) and river estuaries.

Montagnac (French pronunciation: [mɔ̃taɲak]; Occitan: Montanhac) is a commune in the Gard department in southern France.

== Population ==
Historical population
Year	Pop.	±% p.a.
1968	72	—
1975	76	+0.78%
1982	89	+2.28%
1990	99	+1.34%
1999	136	+3.59%
2007	148	+1.06%
2012	222	+8.45%
2017	208	−1.29%
2023	249	+3.04%
Source: INSEE

== See also ==
- Communes of the Gard department
