= La Rouvière =

- Commune
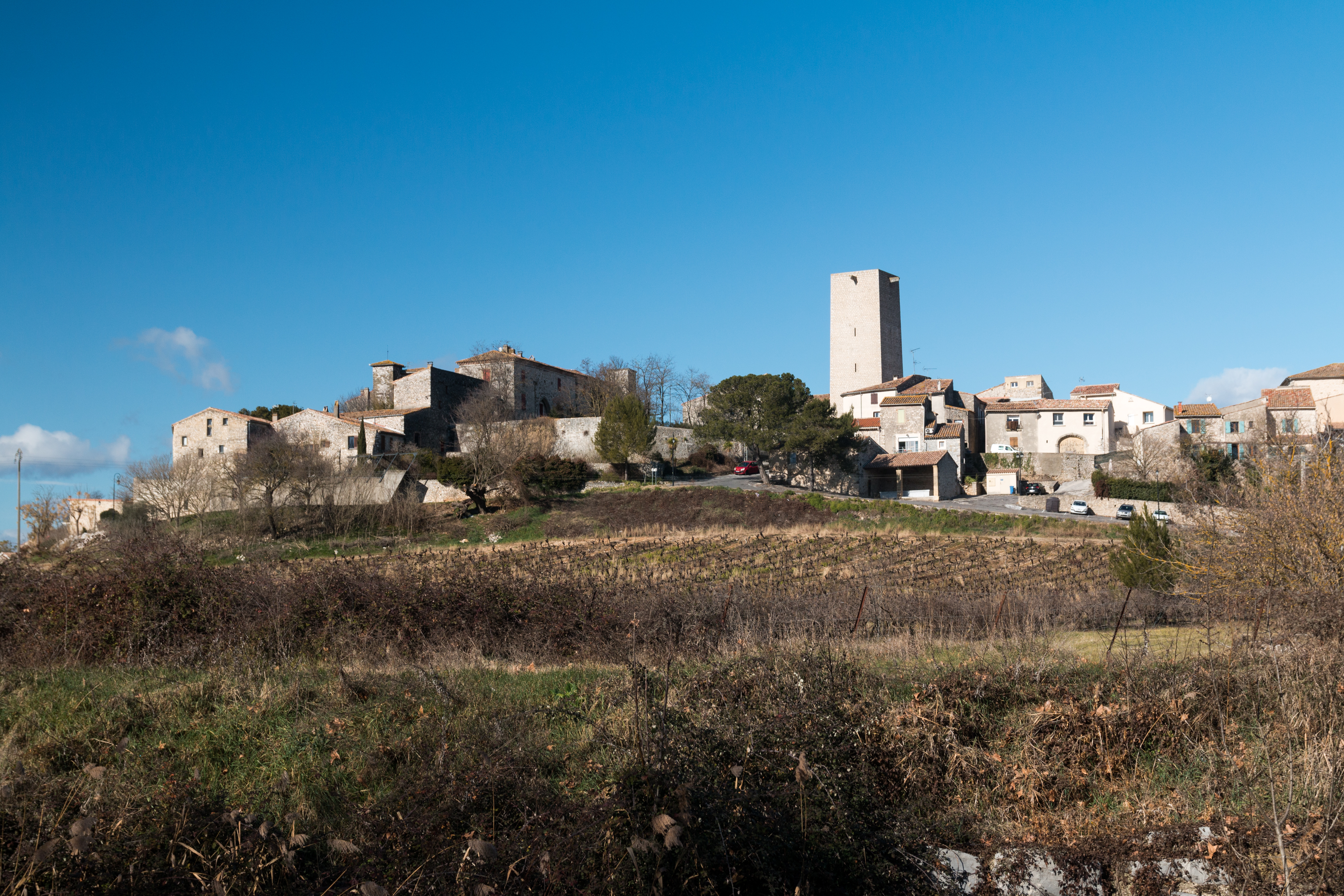

- Coat of arms
- Location of La Rouvière
- Location within France Location within Occitanie
- Coordinates: 43°55′56″N 4°14′10″E
- Country: France
- Region: Occitania
- Department: Gard
- Arrondissement: Nîmes
- Canton: Calvisson
- Intercommunality: CA Nîmes Métropole

Government
  - Mayor (2020–2026): Patrick de Gonzaga
- Area^{1}: 7.9 km^{2} (3.1 sq mi)
- Elevation: 98 m (322 ft)
- Highest elevation: 155 m (509 ft)
- Lowest elevation: 69 m (226 ft)
- Population (2023): 693
  - Density: 88/km^{2} (230/sq mi)
- Time zone: UTC+01:00 (CET)
  - Summer (DST): UTC+02:00 (CEST)
- INSEE/Postal code: 30224 /30190
- ^{1} French Land Register data, which excludes lakes, ponds, glaciers > 1 km^{2} (0.386 sq mi or 247 acres) and river estuaries.

La Rouvière (French pronunciation: [la ʁuvjɛʁ]; Occitan: La Rovièira) is a commune in the Gard department in southern France.

== Geography ==
=== Climate ===
La Rouvière has a hot-summer Mediterranean climate (Köppen climate classification Csa). The average annual temperature in La Rouvière is 14.5 °C (58.1 °F). The average annual rainfall is 914.4 mm (36.00 in) with September as the wettest month. The temperatures are highest on average in July, at around 23.8 °C (74.8 °F), and lowest in January, at around 6.4 °C (43.5 °F). The highest temperature ever recorded in La Rouvière was 43.9 °C (111.0 °F) on 28 June 2019; the coldest temperature ever recorded was −11.4 °C (11.5 °F) on 2 March 2005.

Climate data for La Rouvière (1991−2020 normals, extremes 1986−present)
Month	Jan	Feb	Mar	Apr	May	Jun	Jul	Aug	Sep	Oct	Nov	Dec	Year
Record high °C (°F)	22.3 (72.1)	25.7 (78.3)	27.9 (82.2)	31.2 (88.2)	35.8 (96.4)	43.9 (111.0)	40.7 (105.3)	43.0 (109.4)	36.6 (97.9)	31.5 (88.7)	24.7 (76.5)	21.0 (69.8)	43.9 (111.0)
Mean daily maximum °C (°F)	11.3 (52.3)	13.0 (55.4)	16.9 (62.4)	19.6 (67.3)	23.5 (74.3)	28.1 (82.6)	31.2 (88.2)	31.1 (88.0)	26.1 (79.0)	20.7 (69.3)	15.0 (59.0)	11.7 (53.1)	20.7 (69.3)
Daily mean °C (°F)	6.4 (43.5)	7.2 (45.0)	10.5 (50.9)	13.2 (55.8)	16.9 (62.4)	21.0 (69.8)	23.8 (74.8)	23.6 (74.5)	19.2 (66.6)	15.2 (59.4)	10.1 (50.2)	6.9 (44.4)	14.5 (58.1)
Mean daily minimum °C (°F)	1.4 (34.5)	1.4 (34.5)	4.0 (39.2)	6.8 (44.2)	10.4 (50.7)	13.9 (57.0)	16.3 (61.3)	16.0 (60.8)	12.4 (54.3)	9.7 (49.5)	5.2 (41.4)	2.0 (35.6)	8.3 (46.9)
Record low °C (°F)	−11.0 (12.2)	−9.2 (15.4)	−11.4 (11.5)	−3.9 (25.0)	0.2 (32.4)	4.0 (39.2)	8.2 (46.8)	6.0 (42.8)	3.0 (37.4)	−3.5 (25.7)	−8.0 (17.6)	−10.6 (12.9)	−11.4 (11.5)
Average precipitation mm (inches)	77.9 (3.07)	47.3 (1.86)	58.5 (2.30)	79.4 (3.13)	63.7 (2.51)	48.9 (1.93)	31.3 (1.23)	48.9 (1.93)	141.0 (5.55)	126.4 (4.98)	120.8 (4.76)	70.3 (2.77)	914.4 (36.00)
Average precipitation days (≥ 1.0 mm)	6.6	4.8	5.1	6.8	6.5	4.7	3.1	3.9	5.5	7.1	8.0	6.3	68.5
Source: Météo-France

== Population ==
Historical population
Year	Pop.	±% p.a.
1968	205	—
1975	201	−0.28%
1982	268	+4.20%
1990	353	+3.50%
1999	495	+3.83%
2007	567	+1.71%
2012	578	+0.39%
2017	598	+0.68%
2023	693	+2.49%
Source: INSEE

== See also ==
- Communes of the Gard department
