= Fons, Gard =

Fons
- Commune
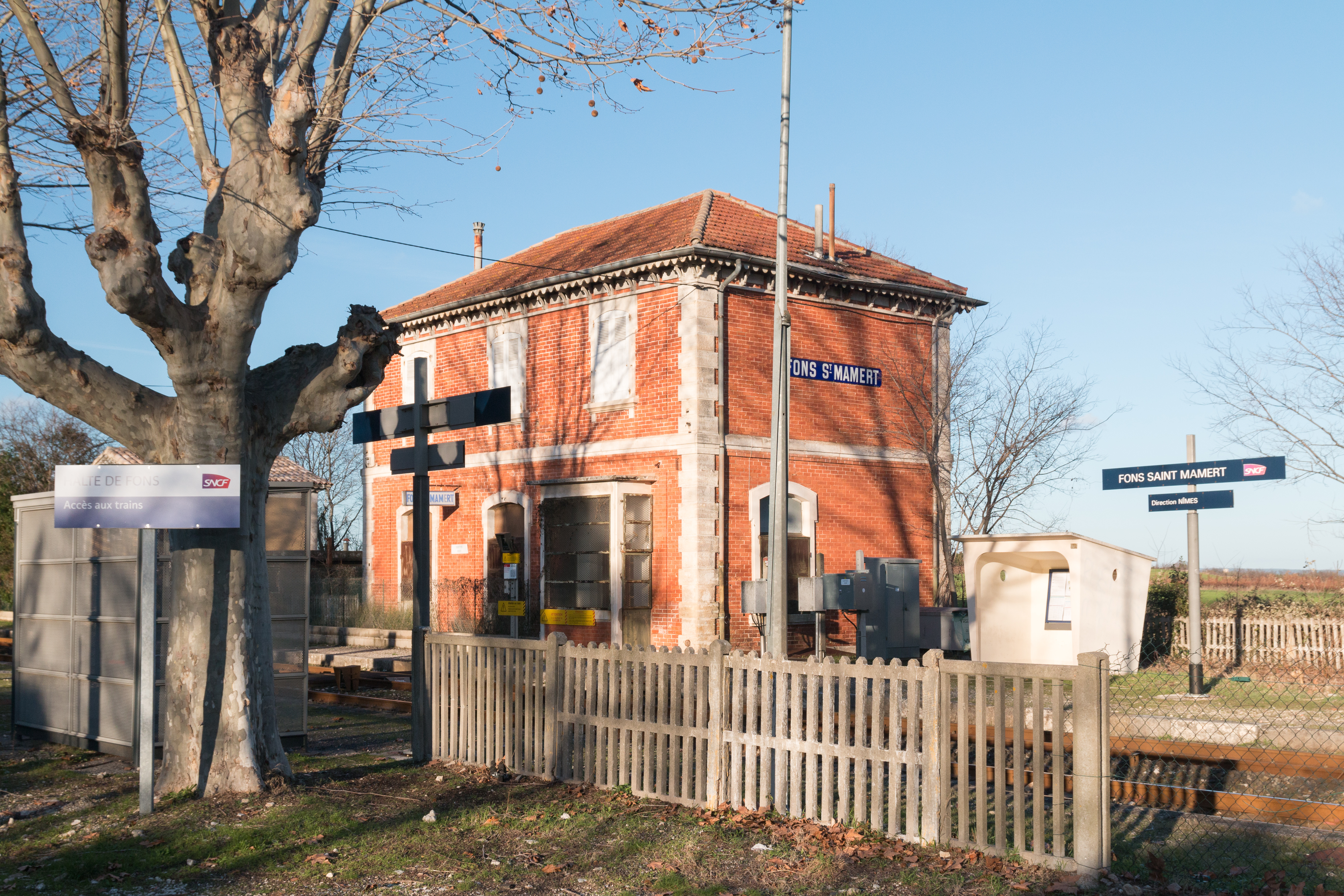
- Train station

- Coat of arms
- Location of Fons
- Location within France Location within Occitanie
- Coordinates: 43°54′30″N 4°11′43″E
- Country: France
- Region: Occitania
- Department: Gard
- Arrondissement: Nîmes
- Canton: Calvisson
- Intercommunality: CA Nîmes Métropole

Government
  - Mayor (2020–2026): Maryse Giannaccini
- Area^{1}: 9.28 km^{2} (3.58 sq mi)
- Elevation: 112 m (367 ft)
- Highest elevation: 224 m (735 ft)
- Lowest elevation: 95 m (312 ft)
- Population (2023): 1,735
  - Density: 187/km^{2} (484/sq mi)
- Time zone: UTC+01:00 (CET)
  - Summer (DST): UTC+02:00 (CEST)
- INSEE/Postal code: 30112 /30730
- ^{1} French Land Register data, which excludes lakes, ponds, glaciers > 1 km^{2} (0.386 sq mi or 247 acres) and river estuaries.

Fons (French pronunciation: [fɔ̃s]; Occitan: Fònts) is a commune in the Gard department in southern France.

== Population ==
Historical population
Year	Pop.	±% p.a.
1968	404	—
1975	404	+0.00%
1982	524	+3.79%
1990	591	+1.52%
1999	741	+2.55%
2007	1,067	+4.66%
2012	1,264	+3.45%
2017	1,506	+3.57%
2023	1,735	+2.39%
Source: INSEE

== See also ==
- Communes of the Gard department
