= Saint-Bauzély =

- Commune
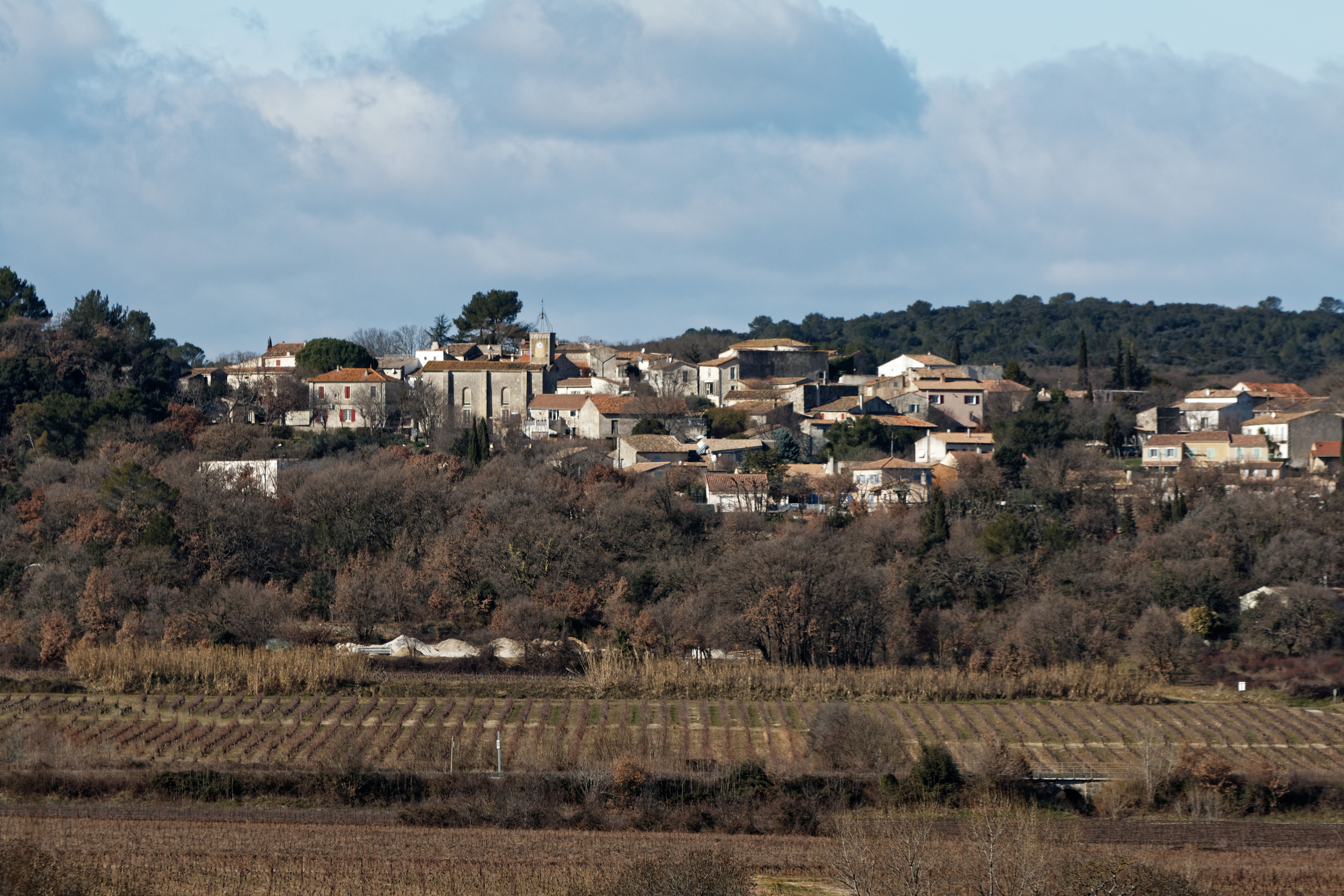

- Coat of arms
- Location of Saint-Bauzély
- Location within France Location within Occitanie
- Coordinates: 43°55′14″N 4°11′52″E
- Country: France
- Region: Occitania
- Department: Gard
- Arrondissement: Nîmes
- Canton: Calvisson
- Intercommunality: CA Nîmes Métropole

Government
  - Mayor (2020–2026): Jacques Durand
- Area^{1}: 5 km^{2} (1.9 sq mi)
- Elevation: 100 m (330 ft)
- Highest elevation: 215 m (705 ft)
- Lowest elevation: 92 m (302 ft)
- Population (2023): 678
  - Density: 140/km^{2} (350/sq mi)
- Time zone: UTC+01:00 (CET)
  - Summer (DST): UTC+02:00 (CEST)
- INSEE/Postal code: 30233 /30730
- ^{1} French Land Register data, which excludes lakes, ponds, glaciers > 1 km^{2} (0.386 sq mi or 247 acres) and river estuaries.

Saint-Bauzély (French pronunciation: [sɛ̃ bozeli]; Occitan: Sent Bausèli) is a commune in the Gard department in southern France.

== Population ==
Historical population
Year	Pop.	±% p.a.
1968	181	—
1975	221	+2.89%
1982	295	+4.21%
1990	331	+1.45%
1999	387	+1.75%
2007	475	+2.59%
2012	565	+3.53%
2017	649	+2.81%
2023	678	+0.73%
Source: INSEE

== See also ==
- Communes of the Gard department
