= Saint-Dionisy =

- Commune
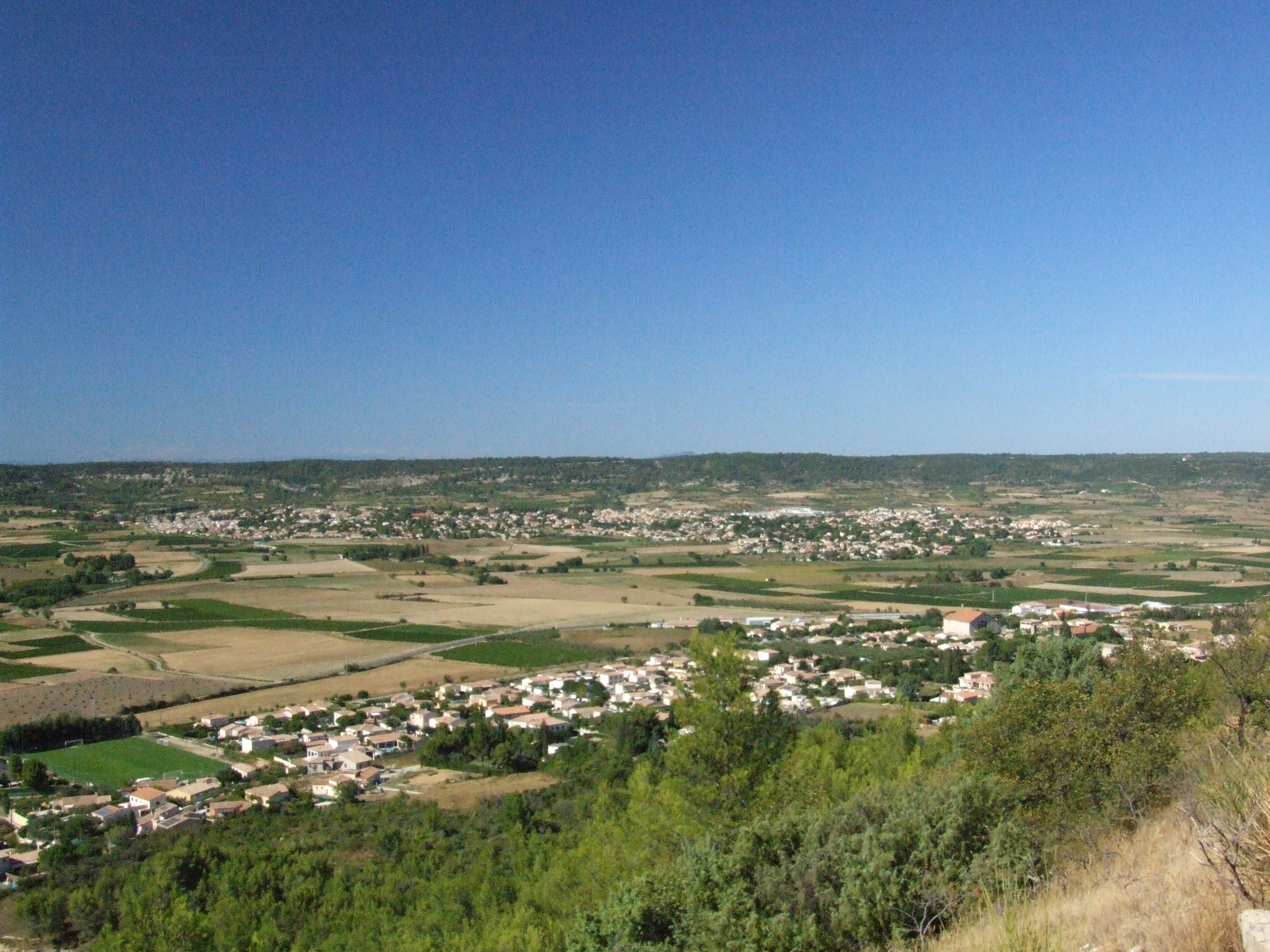
- A general view of Saint-Dionisy

- Coat of arms
- Location of Saint-Dionisy
- Location within France Location within Occitanie
- Coordinates: 43°48′20″N 4°13′46″E
- Country: France
- Region: Occitania
- Department: Gard
- Arrondissement: Nîmes
- Canton: Saint-Gilles
- Intercommunality: CA Nîmes Métropole

Government
  - Mayor (2020–2026): Jean-Christophe Gregoire
- Area^{1}: 3.42 km^{2} (1.32 sq mi)
- Elevation: 70 m (230 ft)
- Highest elevation: 181 m (594 ft)
- Lowest elevation: 36 m (118 ft)
- Population (2023): 1,058
  - Density: 309/km^{2} (801/sq mi)
- Time zone: UTC+01:00 (CET)
  - Summer (DST): UTC+02:00 (CEST)
- INSEE/Postal code: 30249 /30980
- ^{1} French Land Register data, which excludes lakes, ponds, glaciers > 1 km^{2} (0.386 sq mi or 247 acres) and river estuaries.

Saint-Dionisy (French pronunciation: [sɛ̃ djɔnizi], formerly spelled Saint-Dionizy; Occitan: Sent Dionisi) is a commune in the Gard department in southern France.

== Population ==
Historical population
Year	Pop.	±% p.a.
1968	160	—
1975	216	+4.38%
1982	370	+7.99%
1990	401	+1.01%
1999	633	+5.20%
2007	844	+3.66%
2012	951	+2.42%
2017	1,039	+1.79%
2023	1,058	+0.30%
Source: INSEE

== See also ==
- Communes of the Gard department
