= Souvignargues =

- Commune
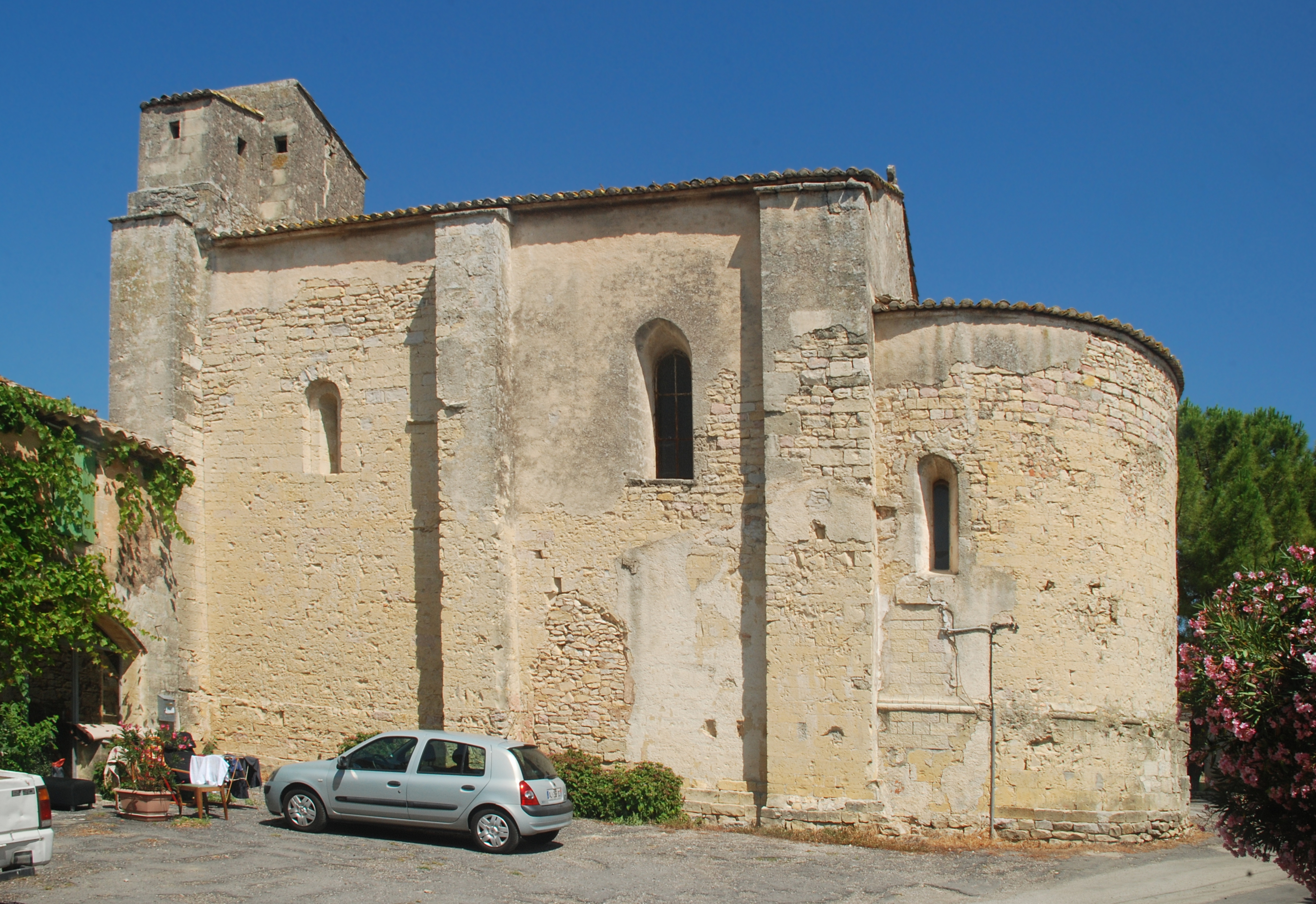
- Church of St. Stephen

- Coat of arms
- Location of Souvignargues
- Location within France Location within Occitanie
- Coordinates: 43°48′53″N 4°07′23″E
- Country: France
- Region: Occitania
- Department: Gard
- Arrondissement: Nîmes
- Canton: Calvisson
- Intercommunality: Pays de Sommières

Government
  - Mayor (2020–2026): Catherine Lecerf
- Area^{1}: 11.09 km^{2} (4.28 sq mi)
- Elevation: 100 m (330 ft)
- Highest elevation: 173 m (568 ft)
- Lowest elevation: 42 m (138 ft)
- Population (2023): 957
  - Density: 86.3/km^{2} (224/sq mi)
- Time zone: UTC+01:00 (CET)
  - Summer (DST): UTC+02:00 (CEST)
- INSEE/Postal code: 30324 /30250
- ^{1} French Land Register data, which excludes lakes, ponds, glaciers > 1 km^{2} (0.386 sq mi or 247 acres) and river estuaries.

Souvignargues (French pronunciation: [suviɲaʁɡ]; Occitan: Sauvinhargues) is a commune in the Gard department in southern France.

== Population ==
Historical population
Year	Pop.	±% p.a.
1968	406	—
1975	370	−1.32%
1982	460	+3.16%
1990	545	+2.14%
1999	589	+0.87%
2007	696	+2.11%
2012	815	+3.21%
2017	871	+1.34%
2023	957	+1.58%
Source: INSEE

== Sights ==
- Remains of the feudal castle (13th-14th centuries)
- Church of St. Stephen (Saint-Étienne d'Escattes), at Escattes, dating to the 12th century.
- Ruined Romanesque church of St. Andrew (12th century)
- Grotto of Bézal, inhabited from the mid-Palaeolithic Age

== See also ==
- Communes of the Gard department
