= Arboretum Sainte-Anastasie =

Arboretum in Languedoc-Roussillon, France

The Arboretum Sainte-Anastasie is an arboretum located on the grounds of the École primaire publique de Sainte-Anastasie at 333, avenue du Général De Gaulle, Sainte-Anastasie, Gard, Languedoc-Roussillon, France. The arboretum was planted from 1993–1996, and contains about 120 labeled specimens of local trees including cherry, cedar, oak, and pine. It is open daily without charge.

== See also ==
- List of botanical gardens in France
