= Crespian =

- Commune
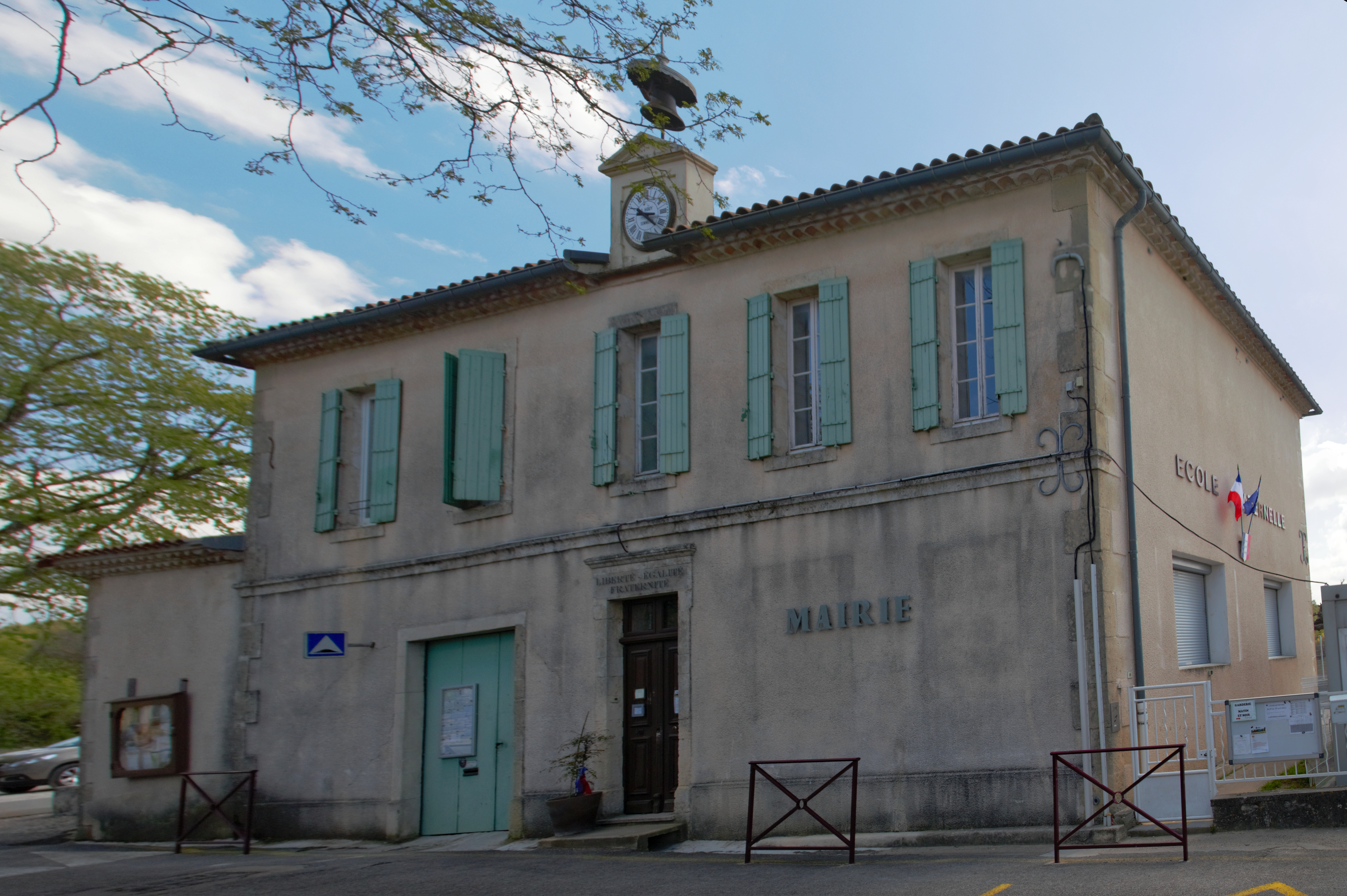
- Town hall

- Coat of arms
- Location of Crespian
- Location within France Location within Occitanie
- Coordinates: 43°52′59″N 4°05′49″E
- Country: France
- Region: Occitania
- Department: Gard
- Arrondissement: Nîmes
- Canton: Calvisson
- Intercommunality: Pays de Sommières

Government
  - Mayor (2020–2026): Pascale Cavalier
- Area^{1}: 7.91 km^{2} (3.05 sq mi)
- Elevation: 80 m (260 ft)
- Highest elevation: 279 m (915 ft)
- Lowest elevation: 48 m (157 ft)
- Population (2023): 522
  - Density: 66.0/km^{2} (171/sq mi)
- Time zone: UTC+01:00 (CET)
  - Summer (DST): UTC+02:00 (CEST)
- INSEE/Postal code: 30098 /30260
- ^{1} French Land Register data, which excludes lakes, ponds, glaciers > 1 km^{2} (0.386 sq mi or 247 acres) and river estuaries.

Crespian (French pronunciation: [kʁɛspjɑ̃]) is a commune in the Gard department in southern France.

== Population ==
Historical population
Year	Pop.	±% p.a.
1968	126	—
1975	120	−0.69%
1982	115	−0.61%
1990	159	+4.13%
1999	206	+2.92%
2007	289	+4.32%
2012	352	+4.02%
2017	423	+3.74%
2023	522	+3.57%
Source: INSEE

== See also ==
- Communes of the Gard department
