= Fontanès, Gard =

Fontanès
- Commune
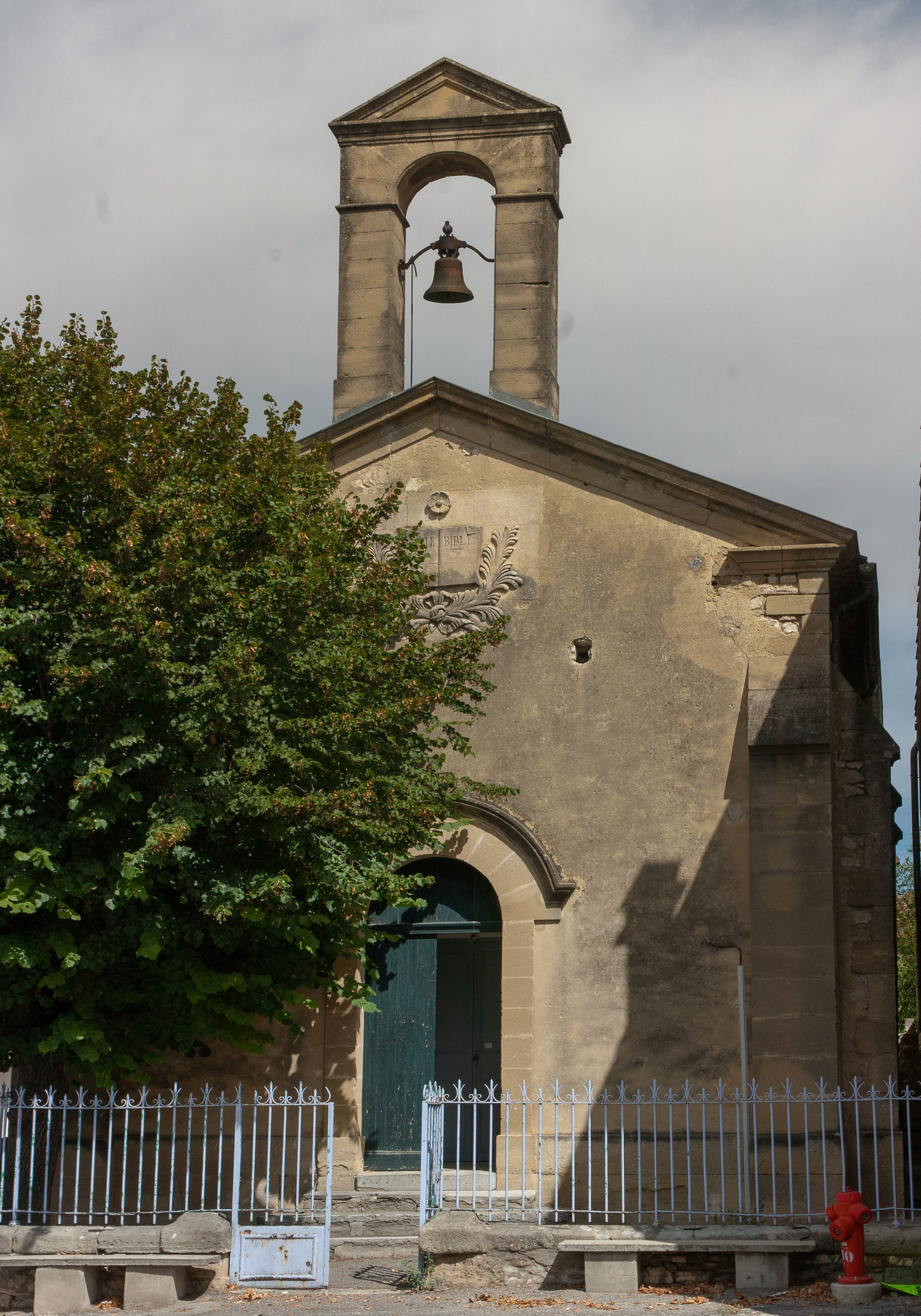
- The Protestant church of Fontanès

- Coat of arms
- Location of Fontanès
- Location within France Location within Occitanie
- Coordinates: 43°49′50″N 4°05′17″E
- Country: France
- Region: Occitania
- Department: Gard
- Arrondissement: Nîmes
- Canton: Calvisson
- Intercommunality: Pays de Sommières

Government
  - Mayor (2020–2026): Alain Therond
- Area^{1}: 14.44 km^{2} (5.58 sq mi)
- Elevation: 60 m (200 ft)
- Highest elevation: 163 m (535 ft)
- Lowest elevation: 24 m (79 ft)
- Population (2023): 700
  - Density: 48/km^{2} (130/sq mi)
- Time zone: UTC+01:00 (CET)
  - Summer (DST): UTC+02:00 (CEST)
- INSEE/Postal code: 30114 /30250
- ^{1} French Land Register data, which excludes lakes, ponds, glaciers > 1 km^{2} (0.386 sq mi or 247 acres) and river estuaries.

Fontanès (French pronunciation: [fɔ̃tanɛs]; Occitan: Fontanés) is a commune in the Gard department in southern France.

== Population ==
Historical population
Year	Pop.	±% p.a.
1968	334	—
1975	326	−0.35%
1982	390	+2.59%
1990	436	+1.40%
1999	492	+1.35%
2007	609	+2.70%
2012	647	+1.22%
2017	690	+1.30%
2023	700	+0.24%
Source: INSEE

== See also ==
- Communes of the Gard department
