= Sauzet, Gard =

Sauzet
- Commune
- Coat of arms
- Location of Sauzet
- Location within France Location within Occitanie
- Coordinates: 43°57′44″N 4°12′41″E
- Country: France
- Region: Occitania
- Department: Gard
- Arrondissement: Nîmes
- Canton: Calvisson
- Intercommunality: CA Nîmes Métropole

Government
  - Mayor (2020–2026): Joseph Artal
- Area^{1}: 6.7 km^{2} (2.6 sq mi)
- Elevation: 60 m (200 ft)
- Highest elevation: 212 m (696 ft)
- Lowest elevation: 63 m (207 ft)
- Population (2023): 853
  - Density: 130/km^{2} (330/sq mi)
- Time zone: UTC+01:00 (CET)
  - Summer (DST): UTC+02:00 (CEST)
- INSEE/Postal code: 30313 /30190
- ^{1} French Land Register data, which excludes lakes, ponds, glaciers > 1 km^{2} (0.386 sq mi or 247 acres) and river estuaries.

Sauzet (French pronunciation: [sozɛ]; Occitan: Sauset) is a commune in the Gard department in southern France.

== Population ==
Historical population
Year	Pop.	±% p.a.
1968	340	—
1975	385	+1.79%
1982	416	+1.11%
1990	482	+1.86%
1999	551	+1.50%
2007	688	+2.81%
2012	703	+0.43%
2017	747	+1.22%
2023	853	+2.24%
Source: INSEE

== See also ==
- Communes of the Gard department
