= Junas, Gard =

Junas
- Commune
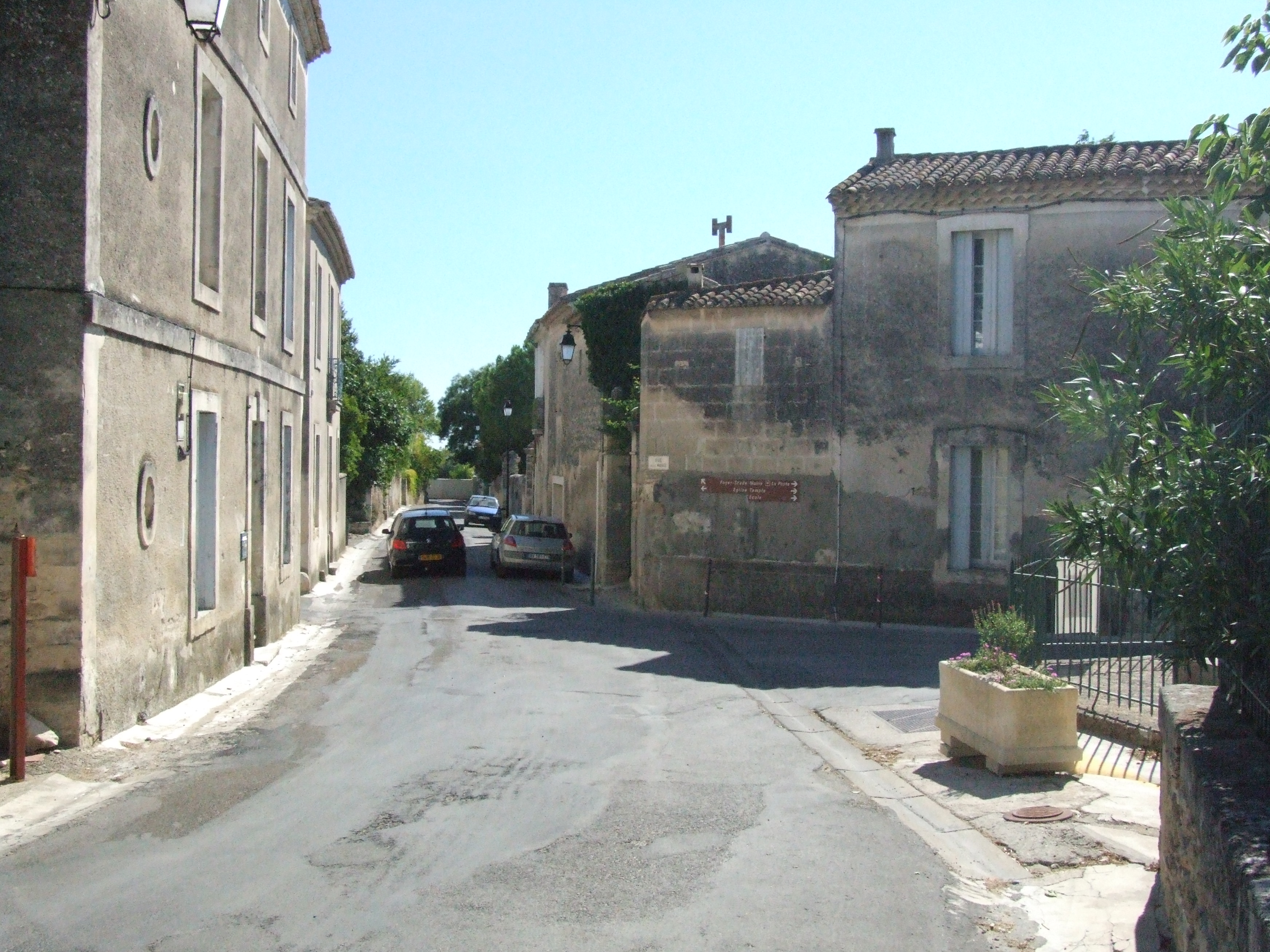
- A view of Junas
- Location of Junas
- Location within France Location within Occitanie
- Coordinates: 43°46′15″N 4°07′24″E
- Country: France
- Region: Occitania
- Department: Gard
- Arrondissement: Nîmes
- Canton: Calvisson
- Intercommunality: Pays de Sommières

Government
  - Mayor (2020–2026): Marie-José Pellet
- Area^{1}: 7.75 km^{2} (2.99 sq mi)
- Elevation: 67 m (220 ft)
- Highest elevation: 96 m (315 ft)
- Lowest elevation: 14 m (46 ft)
- Population (2023): 1,343
  - Density: 173/km^{2} (449/sq mi)
- Time zone: UTC+01:00 (CET)
  - Summer (DST): UTC+02:00 (CEST)
- INSEE/Postal code: 30136 /30250
- ^{1} French Land Register data, which excludes lakes, ponds, glaciers > 1 km^{2} (0.386 sq mi or 247 acres) and river estuaries.

Junas (French pronunciation: [ʒynas]; Occitan: Junaç) is a commune in the Gard department in southern France.

== Population ==
Historical population
Year	Pop.	±% p.a.
1968	321	—
1975	363	+1.77%
1982	518	+5.21%
1990	648	+2.84%
1999	721	+1.19%
2007	1,003	+4.21%
2012	1,082	+1.53%
2017	1,107	+0.46%
2023	1,343	+3.27%
Source: INSEE

== See also ==
- Communes of the Gard department
