= Montpezat, Gard =

Montpezat
- Commune
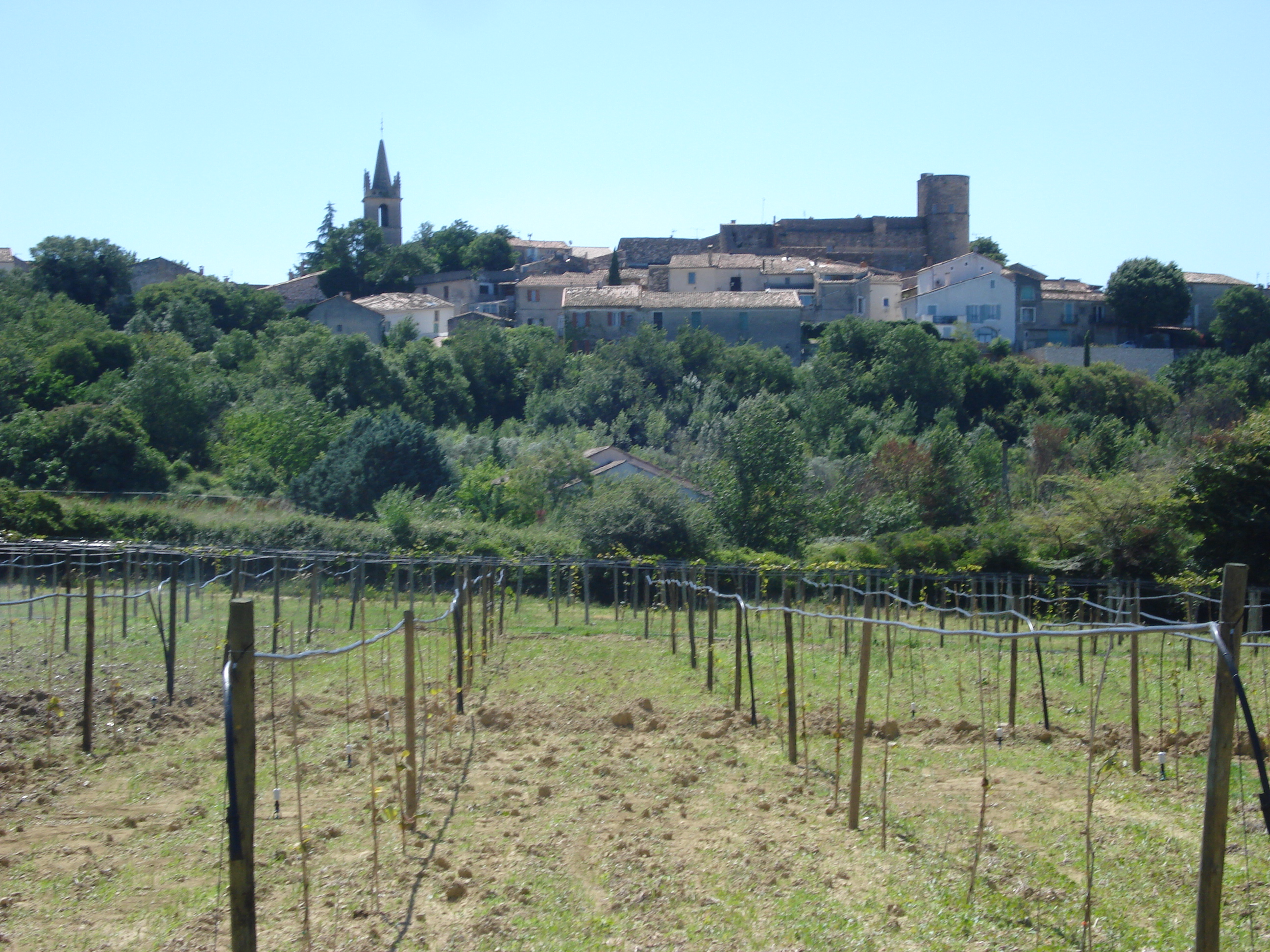
- A general view of Montpezat

- Coat of arms
- Location of Montpezat
- Location within France Location within Occitanie
- Coordinates: 43°51′09″N 4°09′29″E
- Country: France
- Region: Occitania
- Department: Gard
- Arrondissement: Nîmes
- Canton: Calvisson
- Intercommunality: Pays de Sommières

Government
  - Mayor (2020–2026): Jean-Michel Andriuzzi
- Area^{1}: 11.98 km^{2} (4.63 sq mi)
- Elevation: 170 m (560 ft)
- Highest elevation: 193 m (633 ft)
- Lowest elevation: 78 m (256 ft)
- Population (2023): 1,402
  - Density: 117.0/km^{2} (303.1/sq mi)
- Time zone: UTC+01:00 (CET)
  - Summer (DST): UTC+02:00 (CEST)
- INSEE/Postal code: 30182 /30730
- ^{1} French Land Register data, which excludes lakes, ponds, glaciers > 1 km^{2} (0.386 sq mi or 247 acres) and river estuaries.

Montpezat (French pronunciation: [mɔ̃pəza]; Occitan: Montpesat) is a commune in the Gard department in southern France.

== Population ==
Historical population
Year	Pop.	±% p.a.
1968	465	—
1975	473	+0.24%
1982	589	+3.18%
1990	671	+1.64%
1999	923	+3.61%
2007	1,049	+1.61%
2012	1,060	+0.21%
2017	1,234	+3.09%
2023	1,402	+2.15%
Source: INSEE

== See also ==
- Communes of the Gard department
