= Parignargues =

- Commune
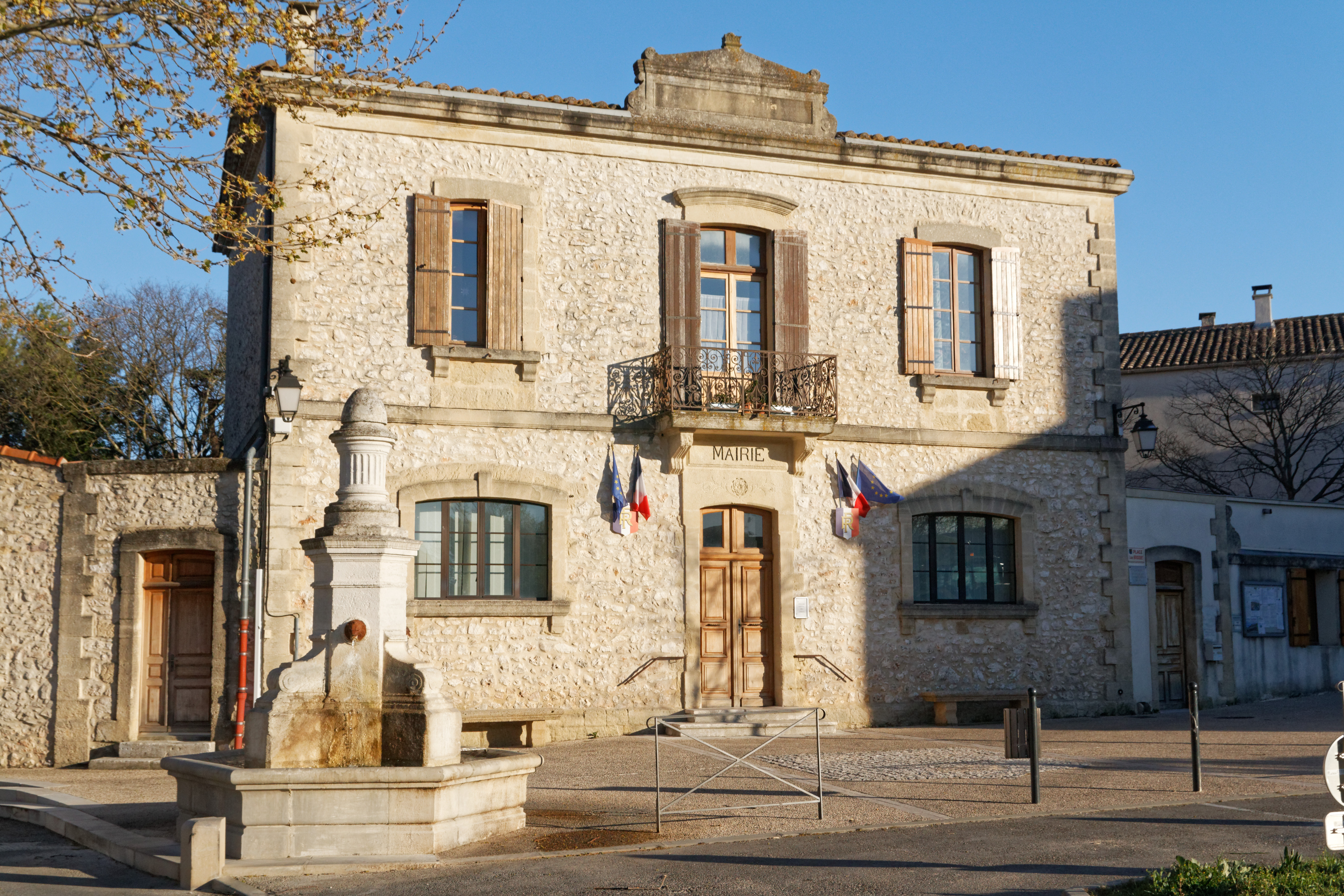
- Town hall

- Coat of arms
- Location of Parignargues
- Location within France Location within Occitanie
- Coordinates: 43°52′27″N 4°12′31″E
- Country: France
- Region: Occitania
- Department: Gard
- Arrondissement: Nîmes
- Canton: Calvisson

Government
  - Mayor (2020–2026): Ivan Couderc
- Area^{1}: 11.01 km^{2} (4.25 sq mi)
- Elevation: 131 m (430 ft)
- Highest elevation: 186 m (610 ft)
- Lowest elevation: 104 m (341 ft)
- Population (2023): 629
  - Density: 57.1/km^{2} (148/sq mi)
- Time zone: UTC+01:00 (CET)
  - Summer (DST): UTC+02:00 (CEST)
- INSEE/Postal code: 30193 /30730
- ^{1} French Land Register data, which excludes lakes, ponds, glaciers > 1 km^{2} (0.386 sq mi or 247 acres) and river estuaries.

Parignargues is a commune in the Gard department in southern France.

== Population ==
Historical population
Year	Pop.	±% p.a.
1968	235	—
1975	328	+4.88%
1982	438	+4.22%
1990	482	+1.20%
1999	567	+1.82%
2007	581	+0.31%
2012	534	−1.67%
2017	678	+4.89%
2023	629	−1.24%
Source: INSEE

== See also ==
- Communes of the Gard department
