= Lussan =

Lussan is the name or part of the name of several communes in France:

- Lussan, in the Gard department
- Lussan, former commune of the Haute-Garonne department, now part of Lussan-Adeilhac
- Lussan, in the Gers department
- Lussan-Adeilhac, in the Haute-Garonne department
- Fons-sur-Lussan, in the Gard department

== See also ==
- Lussant, in the Charente-Maritime department
- Marguerite de Lussan (1682–1758), French historic novelist
