= József Szabó (disambiguation) =

József Szabó (born 1969) is a Hungarian Olympic swimmer.

József Szabó or Joseph Szabo may also refer to:

- József Szabó (footballer, born 1896) (1896–1973), Hungarian football player
- József Szabó (footballer, born 1956) (born 1956), Hungarian football player
- Yozhef Sabo (born 1940), Soviet football player of Hungarian descent
- József Szabó de Szentmiklós (1822–1894), Hungarian geologist
- Joseph Szabo (photographer) (born 1944), American photographer
- Joseph Szabo (painter) (1925–2010), Hungarian painter
- Joseph C. Szabo (born 1957), American railroad administrator
