= Battle of Győr (1577) =

- Part of Ottoman–Habsburg wars
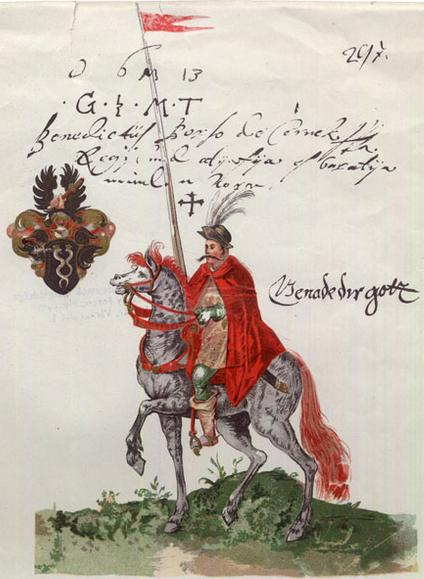
- Hungarian Hussar
Date	4 August 1577
Location	Győr, Hungary
Result	Ottoman victory

Belligerents
(Holy Roman Empire) Habsburg Empire: Kingdom of Hungary	Ottoman Empire

Commanders and leaders
Péter Izdenczy (Holy Roman Empire) Károly Czelting	Kara Ali

Strength
>324 men	500–600 cavalry

Casualties and losses
236 or 316 killed and captured	Unknown

The Battle of Győr was fought between the Ottomans and the Habsburgs on August 4, 1577, during a truce period. The Ottomans defeated the Habsburgs.

== Background ==
1577 during the harvest period, the Hungarians laid an ambush and captured three Ottomans from the castle of Székesfehérvár. Hearing this, the Ottoman governor of Székesfehérvár, Kara Ali, dispatched 110 cavalry to chase the Hungarians and on the next day, rode out with 500 cavalry. The Ottomans arrived at the village of Nyúl near Győr. Kara Ali surrounded the village without being noticed. On August 4, a peasant saw them and alerted the town of their arrival. The vice-captain of Győr, Gregoróczy Vince, dispatched a force of 60 hussars to meet the Ottomans under Vajda Kristóf and Rácz Péter. He warned both not to chase the Ottomans too far. The small force was surrounded by the Ottomans but managed to break off the encirclement.

== Battle ==
Meanwhile, a force of 300 Hadjuks under Péter Izdenczy, captain of the Hungarian infantry. The Hadjuk force had also two dozen German musketmen led by Károly Czelting. The retreating Hussars joined with the main force. The Hungarians formed two wings with the Hussars in the middle. An Ottoman cavalry force of 500-600 were rushing towards them. The infantry tried to establish a fortification of wagons with German muskets on them. The hussars were successful in diverting the Ottoman cavalry's focus away from them. The hussars were suddenly told to retreat by Czelting, leaving the infantry to face the Ottomans alone. In a few minutes, the Ottomans overran them and caused a great slaughter among them. Péter Izdenczy escaped leaving his troops in the battle. The battle ended disastrously with a loss of 236 killed or captured, while other sources state 316 killed or captured.

== Aftermath ==
The news of the defeat of the Győrs quickly spread both at home and abroad. In August, a committee went to Győr to find out the reason for the defeat. The commission inspected the battlefield, interrogated the Hungarian officers, and determined that the retreat was unnecessary and a mistake. According to the commission's opinion, the reason for the defeat was the general of Győr: Károly Czelting, because he ordered the hussars back. Gregoróczy was also warned to fill up the numbers of the garrison and make the provisions better.

== Sources ==
- Szántai Gábor (2018), 1577, a Christian defeat at Győr castle.
- Takáts Sándor (1979), Fighting Hungarians: images from the Turkish world : [essays] (Magyar).
- Lajos Gecsényi (1994), Tactics of the battles at Végvár (Turkish raid under Győr in 1577) (Magyar).
