= Joseph Szabo (painter) =

French painter

- Born: Szabó József; 1925; Nyúl, Hungary
- Died: 2010 (aged 84–85); Fons-sur-Lussan, France
- Known for: Painting Sculpture

Joseph Szabo (born József Szabó; 1925–2010) was a Hungarian-born French painter and sculptor. He studied at Hungarian University of Fine Arts in Budapest between 1947 and 1953. His teachers were István Szőnyi, László Bencze (painter), Gyula Pap (painter) and Jenő Barcsay. He immigrated to France in 1956. He continued his education in the field of fine arts in Paris, then in Nice. Initially, he painted surrealistic and dark pictures full of sombre colours that recall paintings of Grünewald and Bosch.

By the late eighties, he came quite near to the limits of abstraction, and turned toward a more liberated, more colourful and less figurative art. Later, he painted expressive pictures with mosaic effect. In addition to paintings, he made sculptures as well; one of his monumental creations stands in front of the building of Médiathèque François Mitterrand in Sète, France. His paintings were exhibited in several art galleries, inter alia in Zürich, Chicago, New York, Montreal, Paris, Lyon, Nîmes, Madrid, Milan and Geneva.

== Life ==
Szabo was born in 1925, in Nyúl, Hungary. He was of a peasant family, and spent his childhood living in poverty together with his seven brothers and sisters. When he was only nine years old, his teacher was amazed by his exceptional drawing talent, but he could only move at the age of twenty-two to Budapest, in 1947, due to dire financial situation of his family, to commence his studies at Hungarian University of Fine Arts. Here, he met groups of intellectuals of Budapest, attended theatre performances, discovered music, and proved to be quite gifted at it as well, but ceased his musical studies soon thereafter to bestow all his energy on painting.

In 1953, after graduating from the University, he was granted a significant scholarship; he acquired a studio, and his financial situation allowed him to lead a lifestyle that was hungered after by many of his contemporaries. But he felt like a prisoner and experienced feelings of vulnerability because of obligations imposed by the politics of the Communist state. In 1956, borders were open toward the West, and he decided to make his boyhood dream happen, so he left Hungary moving to France. He was admitted to the Paris Academy of Art with a scholarship. Despite his successes (he won the first prize of the foreign artists' exhibition), he suffered from isolation, and felt lost in Paris without encouragements. He realized that mediocre paltriness was extolled without limits, and second- and even third-rate artists were successful thanks to practices that were always rejected and despised by him out of honesty.

He continued his studies in Nice, where he was provided with a studio. His name had an excellent reputation in France, and he received a substantial financial assistance, in the form of an interest-free loan, with the help of the Minister of Culture, thanks to a prize awarded to him. With this money, he began to restore a ruined house, doing all work with his own hand. But his paintings did not sell very well, so he left Paris and moved to Fons-sur-Lussan in the South of France. He restored another house there, but it did not satisfy him either; he again sold the restored house and rebuilt a building abandoned for a hundred years. Meanwhile, his canvases were exhibited in Madrid under the best possible conditions; reporters, the radio and television reported of this event with great enthusiasm. His house had been completed in France, and he turned the top floor into a workshop.

He was invited to the United States in 1967, where he could see again several of his artworks in the greatest galleries of Chicago, and at exhibitions of the highest quality works. He could sell his paintings made in France at a high price, but he took no delight in works he created there and could barely sell them at half-price. He returned to France after three months. On an occasion of an exhibition in Paris, television showed some of his artworks and commented them as the powerful expression of the artist's feelings and misery saturated with Hungarian temperament.

== Works ==
Joseph Szabó only worked with thin paint brushes, with completely clear strokes like those who paint Porcelains with gold. He was able to display figures on his canvases with this subtle technique, point by point, as if each brush stroke could add a new living cell to the figures.

The lifework of Szabó can be divided into periods. Between two extremely productive periods that, at the same time, marked the beginning and end of his lifework – the first period established his reputation as a fantastic, dreamlike and surrealist artist, and the last period remained unfinished in a sense -, there are several phases in which Szabó devoted himself to an artistic technique, a topic in a collected and virtuosic way. For example, his disproportionate anatomic studies made with black drawing ink that look like they were woven from a single string, or the series with pastose colour compositions in acrylic, which were classified as sculptures by Szabó rather than paintings.

Joseph Szabó was known to be a loner. There are combinations of figures in his compositions: they might be poor in spirit of the Bible, embittered souls of Dostoyevsky, and Hungarian peasant figures. These figures evoke the pictures to Flemish and Dutch painting of 16th and 17th centuries. Scenes include peasant weddings and fairs, tricksters, admirers of natural phenomena, an audience gathered for the sermon of John the Baptist, or groups envisioning legendary monsters. Such scenes are similar to the compositions of Brueghel, Bosch and their contemporaries.

Monsters or rather gremlins, birds and bird men. Simple, quite uniform faces, smile plastered on their faces, a bit dumb, but not antipathetic, grin of waiting, mingled with uncertainty. There is a book or a primitive magnifying glass, a piece of glass, maybe a mirror in the hand of some, a trickster is balancing a ball on the tip of his nose, another one is blowing a horn, perhaps he is making music. There are little ones, big ones and bigger ones, in a continuous dimensional shift, people, sometimes among them busts, sculptures, but sometimes only faces, reflectors of feelings and states of mind, are left of the bodies. In many cases, the figures are on platforms and theatrical spaces proportioned with perspective lines lead to desert and rocky landscapes of backgrounds behind them, like on the artworks of Dalí and Tanguy. Joseph Szabó set his stage in a strange moonscape for his figures of visual parables, which look anything but paradise on earth. It rather is ruins of civilization, as he said once paraphrasing Brecht speaking about cities: "We went in, but gained nothing, we’ll disappear quickly, and cities will disappear slowly as well."

Early paintings of Szabó, as well as some of his artworks from connecting periods, have already been exhibited, individually or in groups, in France and several other countries. Fundamentally, paintings of the last period did not leave the artistic home of Szabó, and neither did he. They all bear the design signature of Szabó, but, with few exceptions, are not signed by him. The painter explained it in 2010, the year of his death, this way: "... technically, they are nearly completed, two or three corrections are missing, and they would be 50% better with a coating".

== Solo exhibitions ==
- 1967 Chicago, Los Angeles, Montreal
- 1973 Manzini Galérie d’Arte – Milan
- 1976 La Galérie Bernard Letu – Geneva
- 1976 Galerie Plexus – CHEXBRES – Switzerland
- 1977 Galérie Chiron – Paris
- 1978 Musée Fabre – Montpellier
- 1978 Madrid
- 1980 Musée Paul Valéry – Sète
- 1981 Musée Colombier – Alès
- 1981 Galérie Malaval – Lyon
- 1982 Musée d'Évreux Ancien Évéché – Évreux
- 1982 Musée de Berry – Bourges
- 1990 Vichy Galere D'Art Contemporain – France
- 1991 Nîmes Espace Gard – France
- 2012 Bakonyi Ház – Sopron
- 2014 Makláry Fine Arts – Budapest
- 2016 Hal Köz Gallery – Debrecen
- ???? Nîmes Galérie Intermezzo

== Prizes ==
- Exposition des Peintres Hongrois aux Beaux-Arts – 1st prize, (1958)
- International Paintings, 1st prize of the Graphics And Art Festival in Saint-Germain-Des-Près (1975)
- Humanitarian Grand Prix of France (with a Vermeil medallion)

== Sources ==
- Cserba Júlia (2006). Magyar képzőművészek Franciaországban 1903–2005. Budapest. ISBN 9789639552739.
- Catalogs:
- Galérie Chiron 1977. – Paris
- Montpellier 1978. Musée Fabre
- Musée de Berry – Bourges 1982.
- Sète 1980, 1988.
- Nîmes Éspace Gard 1991.
