= Saint-Just-et-Vacquières =

- Commune
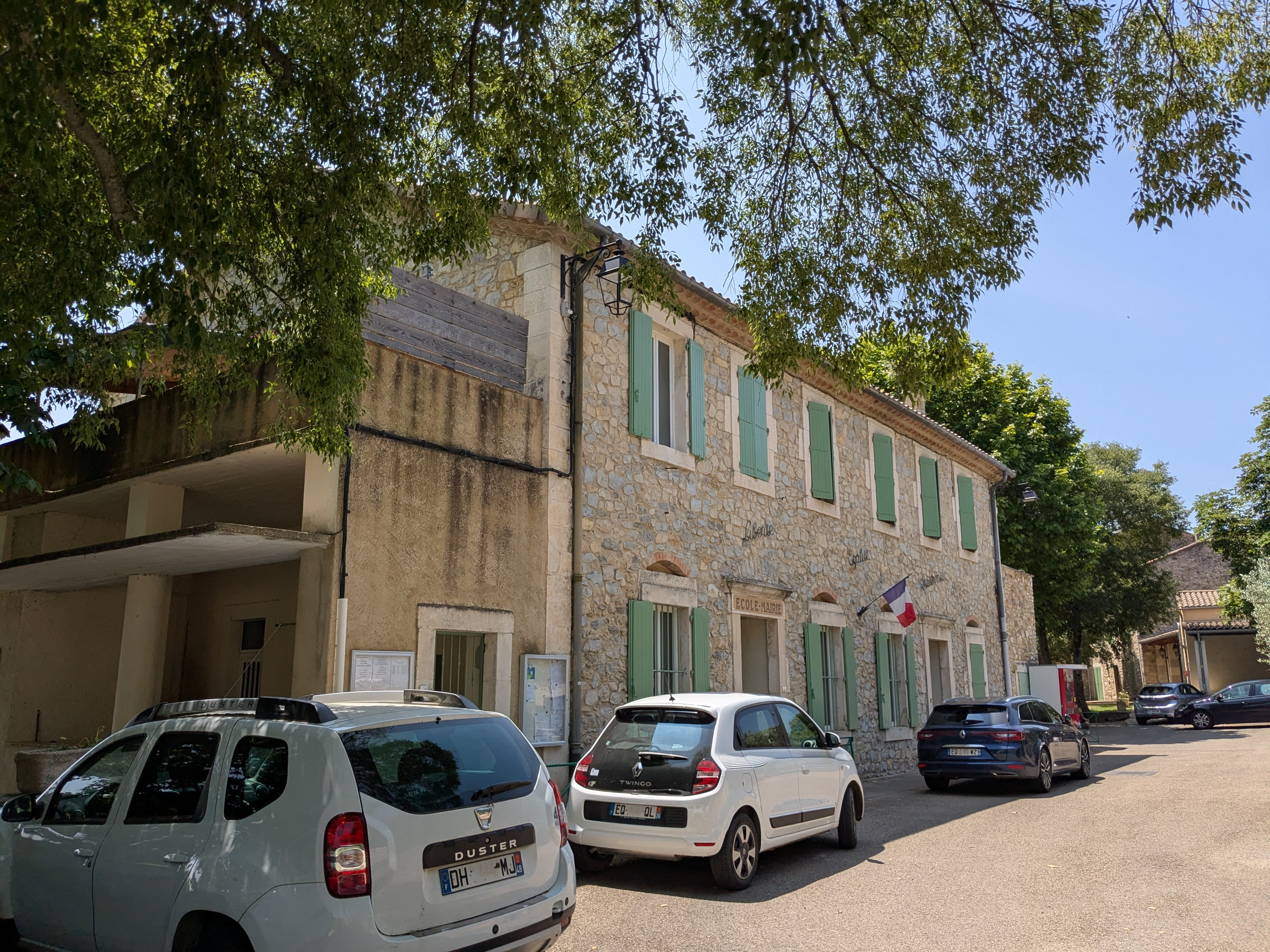
- Saint-Just-et-Vacquières Town hall

- Coat of arms
- Location of Saint-Just-et-Vacquières
- Location within France Location within Occitanie
- Coordinates: 44°06′43″N 4°13′30″E
- Country: France
- Region: Occitania
- Department: Gard
- Arrondissement: Alès
- Canton: Alès-2
- Intercommunality: Alès Agglomération

Government
  - Mayor (2020–2026): Jean Michel Burel
- Area^{1}: 23.52 km^{2} (9.08 sq mi)
- Elevation: 189 m (620 ft)
- Highest elevation: 309 m (1,014 ft)
- Lowest elevation: 128 m (420 ft)
- Population (2023): 325
  - Density: 13.8/km^{2} (35.8/sq mi)
- Time zone: UTC+01:00 (CET)
  - Summer (DST): UTC+02:00 (CEST)
- INSEE/Postal code: 30275 /30580
- ^{1} French Land Register data, which excludes lakes, ponds, glaciers > 1 km^{2} (0.386 sq mi or 247 acres) and river estuaries.

Saint-Just-et-Vacquières (French pronunciation: [sɛ̃ ʒy(st) e vakjɛʁ]; Occitan: Sent Just e Vaquièiras) is a commune in the Gard department in southern France.

== Population ==
Historical population
Year	Pop.	±% p.a.
1968	136	—
1975	141	+0.52%
1982	190	+4.35%
1990	231	+2.47%
1999	259	+1.28%
2007	266	+0.33%
2012	291	+1.81%
2017	302	+0.74%
2023	325	+1.23%
Source: INSEE

== See also ==
- Communes of the Gard department
