= Belvézet =

Commune in Occitanie, France

- Commune
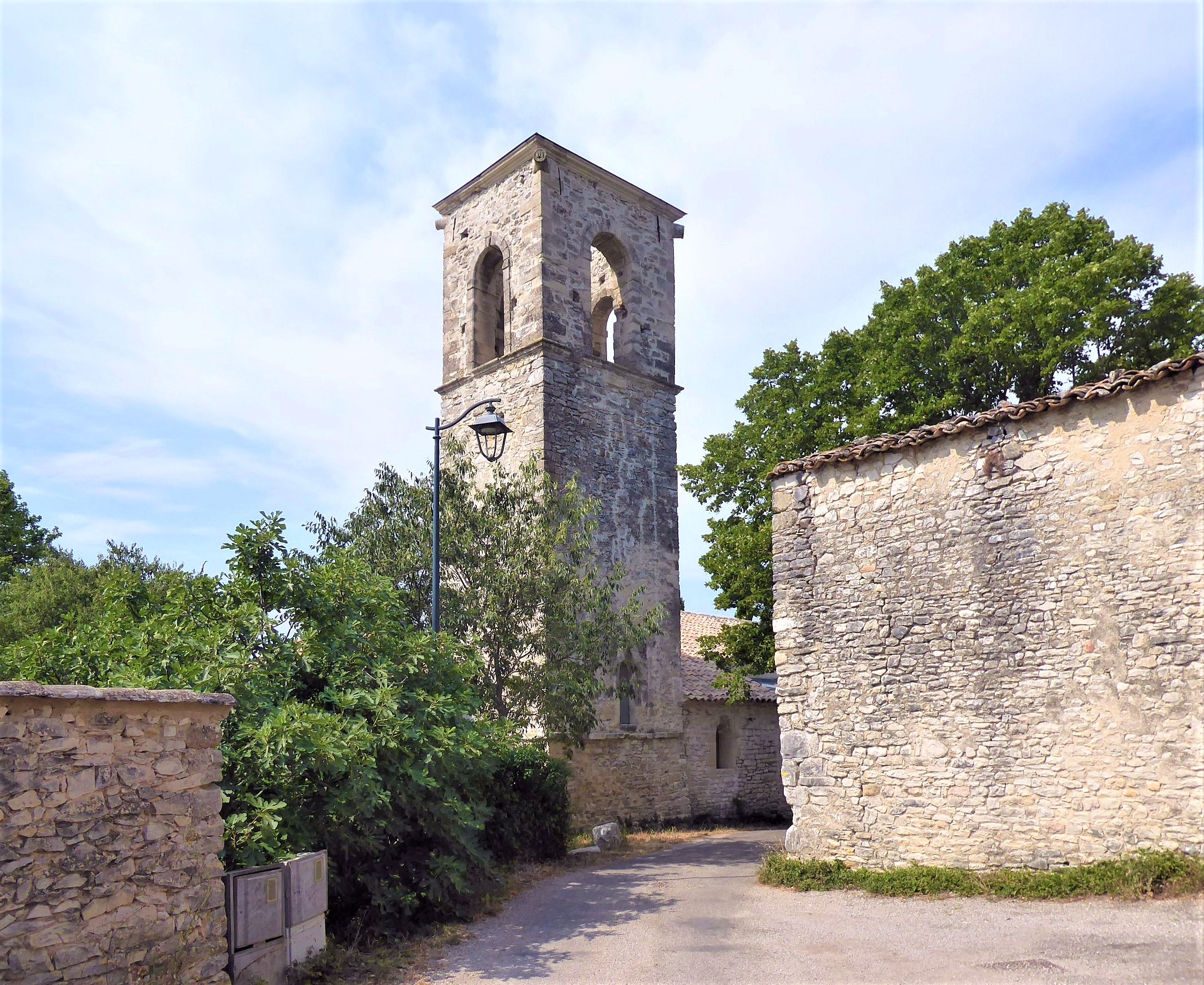
- Old church of Saint-André

- Coat of arms
- Location of Belvézet
- Location within France Location within Occitanie
- Coordinates: 44°05′08″N 4°21′57″E
- Country: France
- Region: Occitania
- Department: Gard
- Arrondissement: Nîmes
- Canton: Alès-2

Government
  - Mayor (2020–2026): Michel Lafont
- Area^{1}: 22.86 km^{2} (8.83 sq mi)
- Elevation: 220 m (720 ft)
- Highest elevation: 329 m (1,079 ft)
- Lowest elevation: 150 m (490 ft)
- Population (2023): 250
  - Density: 11/km^{2} (28/sq mi)
- Time zone: UTC+01:00 (CET)
  - Summer (DST): UTC+02:00 (CEST)
- INSEE/Postal code: 30035 /30580
- ^{1} French Land Register data, which excludes lakes, ponds, glaciers > 1 km^{2} (0.386 sq mi or 247 acres) and river estuaries.

Belvézet (French pronunciation: [bɛlvezɛ]; Occitan: Bèuveser) is a commune in the Gard department in southern France.

== Population ==
Historical population
Year	Pop.	±% p.a.
1968	109	—
1975	127	+2.21%
1982	159	+3.26%
1990	149	−0.81%
1999	210	+3.89%
2007	228	+1.03%
2012	253	+2.10%
2017	245	−0.64%
2023	250	+0.34%
Source: INSEE

== See also ==
- Communes of the Gard department
