= Seynes =

- Commune
- Coat of arms
- Location of Seynes
- Location within France Location within Occitanie
- Coordinates: 44°07′02″N 4°17′03″E
- Country: France
- Region: Occitania
- Department: Gard
- Arrondissement: Alès
- Canton: Alès-2
- Intercommunality: Alès Agglomération

Government
  - Mayor (2020–2026): Thierry Jonquet
- Area^{1}: 14.33 km^{2} (5.53 sq mi)
- Elevation: 267 m (876 ft)
- Highest elevation: 623 m (2,044 ft)
- Lowest elevation: 200 m (660 ft)
- Population (2023): 180
  - Density: 13/km^{2} (33/sq mi)
- Time zone: UTC+01:00 (CET)
  - Summer (DST): UTC+02:00 (CEST)
- INSEE/Postal code: 30320 /30580
- ^{1} French Land Register data, which excludes lakes, ponds, glaciers > 1 km^{2} (0.386 sq mi or 247 acres) and river estuaries.

Seynes (French pronunciation: [sɛn]; Occitan: Sèina) is a commune in the Gard department in southern France.

== Population ==
Historical population
Year	Pop.	±% p.a.
1968	117	—
1975	108	−1.14%
1982	111	+0.39%
1990	116	+0.55%
1999	133	+1.53%
2007	141	+0.73%
2012	159	+2.43%
2017	161	+0.25%
2023	180	+1.88%
Source: INSEE

== Sport ==
Sport climbing cliff made famous by the continuous limestone tufa formations.

== See also ==
- Communes of the Gard department
