= Bouquet, Gard =

Commune in Occitanie, France

Bouquet
- Commune
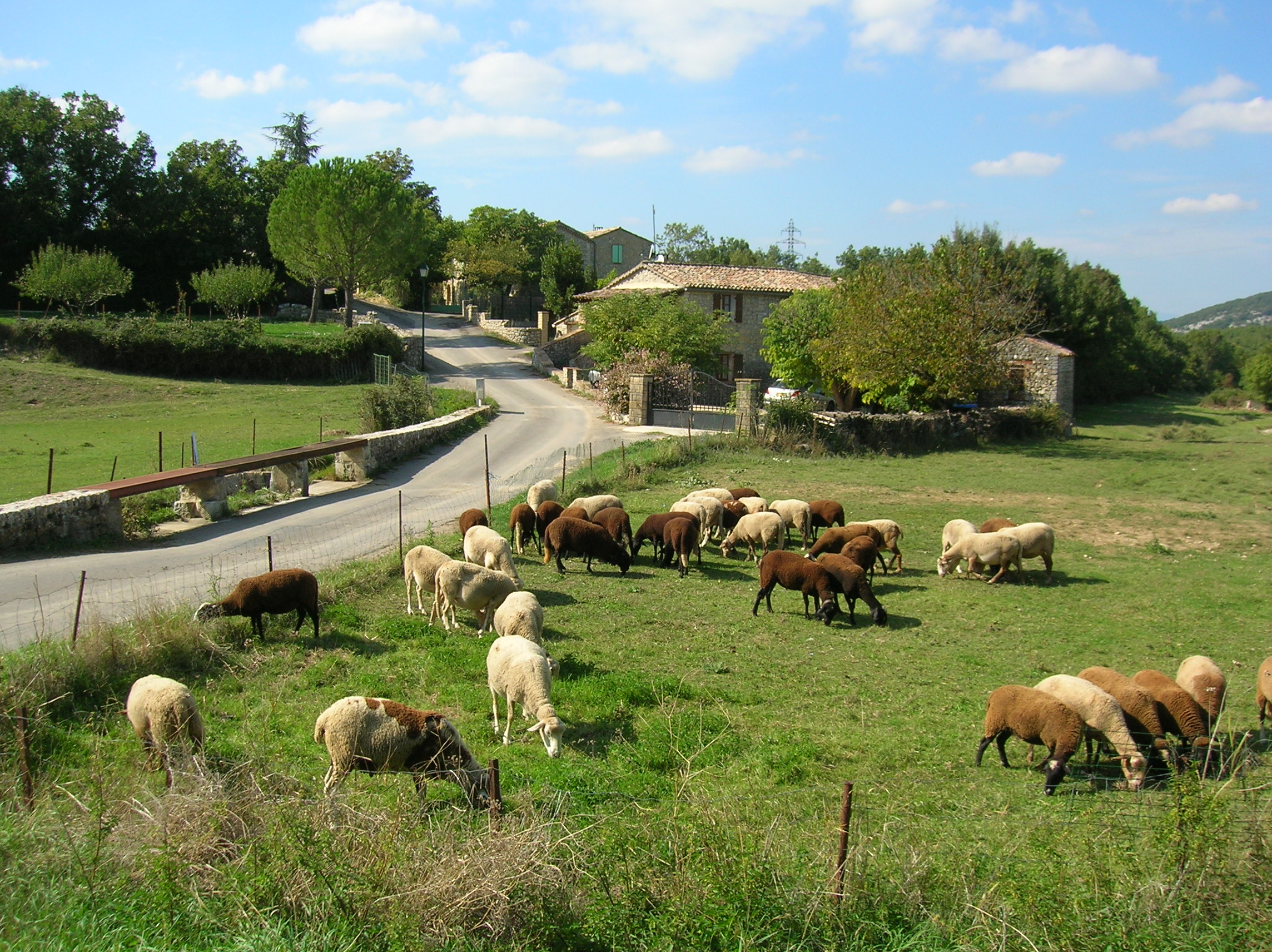
- A general view of Bouquet

- Coat of arms
- Location of Bouquet
- Location within France Location within Occitanie
- Coordinates: 44°09′36″N 4°17′27″E
- Country: France
- Region: Occitania
- Department: Gard
- Arrondissement: Nimes
- Canton: Alès-2
- Intercommunality: Pays d'Uzès

Government
  - Mayor (2020–2026): Catherine Ferrière
- Area^{1}: 30.26 km^{2} (11.68 sq mi)
- Elevation: 631 m (2,070 ft)
- Highest elevation: 600 m (2,000 ft)
- Lowest elevation: 159 m (522 ft)
- Population (2023): 198
  - Density: 6.54/km^{2} (16.9/sq mi)
- Time zone: UTC+01:00 (CET)
  - Summer (DST): UTC+02:00 (CEST)
- INSEE/Postal code: 30048 /30580
- ^{1} French Land Register data, which excludes lakes, ponds, glaciers > 1 km^{2} (0.386 sq mi or 247 acres) and river estuaries.

Bouquet (French pronunciation: [bukɛ]; Occitan: Boquet) is a commune in the Gard department in southern France.

== Population ==
Historical population
| Year | Pop. | ±% p.a. |
|---|---|---|
| 1968 | 73 | — |
| 1975 | 85 | +2.20% |
| 1982 | 114 | +4.28% |
| 1990 | 103 | −1.26% |
| 1999 | 143 | +3.71% |
| 2007 | 187 | +3.41% |
| 2012 | 175 | −1.32% |
| 2017 | 176 | +0.11% |
| 2023 | 198 | +1.98% |
Source: INSEE

== See also ==
- Communes of the Gard department
