= Saint-Martin-de-Valgalgues =

- Commune
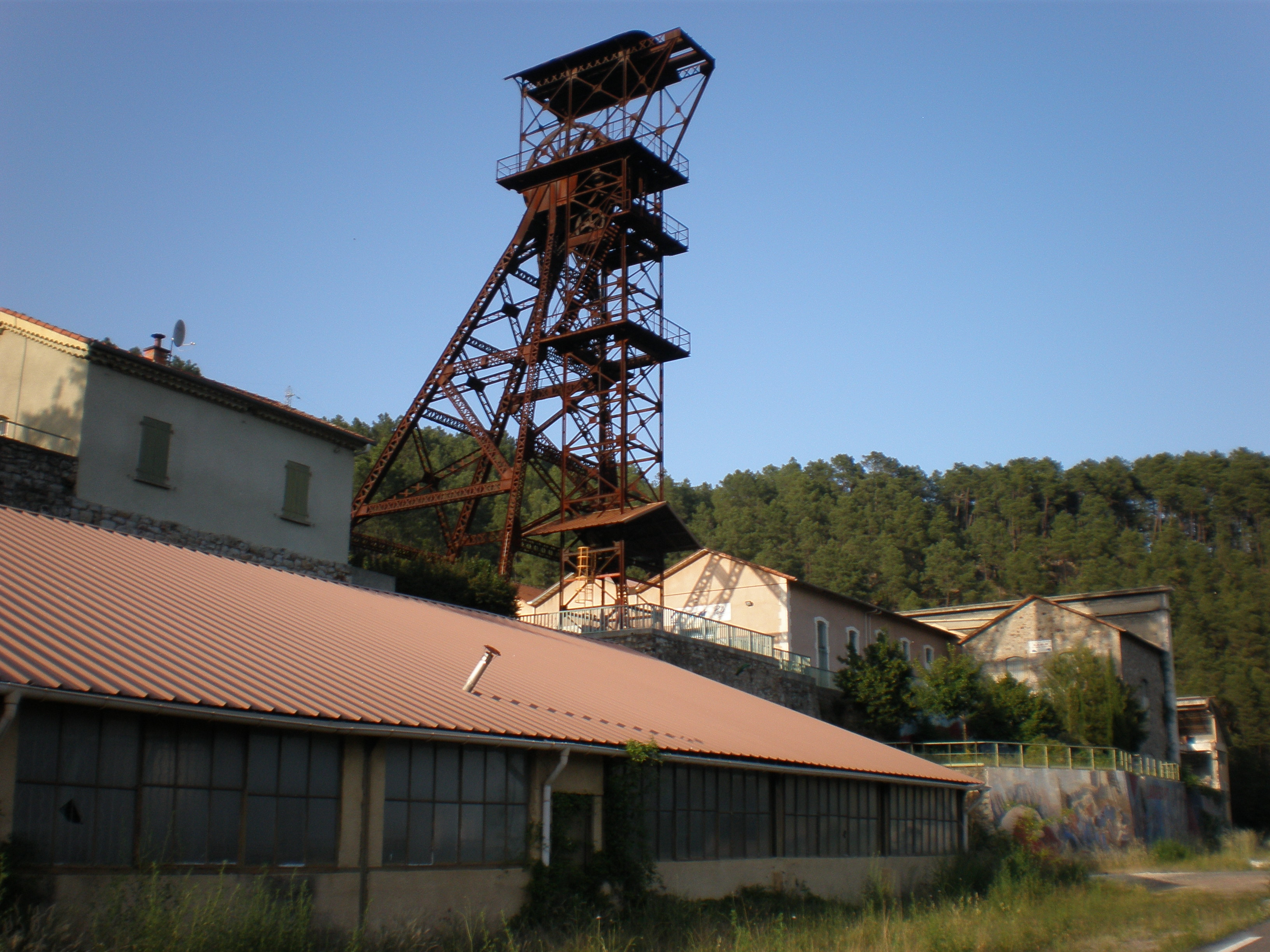
- The pithead of the former Alès mine

- Coat of arms
- Location of Saint-Martin-de-Valgalgues
- Location within France Location within Occitanie
- Coordinates: 44°09′50″N 4°04′58″E
- Country: France
- Region: Occitania
- Department: Gard
- Arrondissement: Alès
- Canton: Alès-2
- Intercommunality: Alès Agglomération

Government
  - Mayor (2020–2026): Claude Cerpedes
- Area^{1}: 13.11 km^{2} (5.06 sq mi)
- Elevation: 149 m (489 ft)
- Highest elevation: 365 m (1,198 ft)
- Lowest elevation: 130 m (430 ft)
- Population (2023): 4,840
  - Density: 369/km^{2} (956/sq mi)
- Time zone: UTC+01:00 (CET)
  - Summer (DST): UTC+02:00 (CEST)
- INSEE/Postal code: 30284 /30520
- ^{1} French Land Register data, which excludes lakes, ponds, glaciers > 1 km^{2} (0.386 sq mi or 247 acres) and river estuaries.

Saint-Martin-de-Valgalgues (French pronunciation: [sɛ̃ maʁtɛ̃ də valɡalɡ]; Occitan: Sent Martin de Valgalga) is a commune in the Gard department in southern France.

== Population ==
Historical population

Year	Pop.	±% p.a.
1793	369	—
1821	710	+2.36%
1846	1,389	+2.72%
1872	1,503	+0.30%
1901	1,810	+0.64%
1926	2,694	+1.60%
1946	2,680	−0.03%
1962	3,713	+2.06%
1968	3,404	−1.44%

Year	Pop.	±% p.a.
1975	3,364	−0.17%
1982	4,209	+3.25%
1990	4,487	+0.80%
1999	4,283	−0.52%
2007	4,150	−0.39%
2012	4,244	+0.45%
2017	4,419	+0.81%
2023	4,840	+1.53%

Source: EHESS and INSEE (1968-2023)

== See also ==
- Communes of the Gard department
