= Saint-Privat-des-Vieux =

- Commune
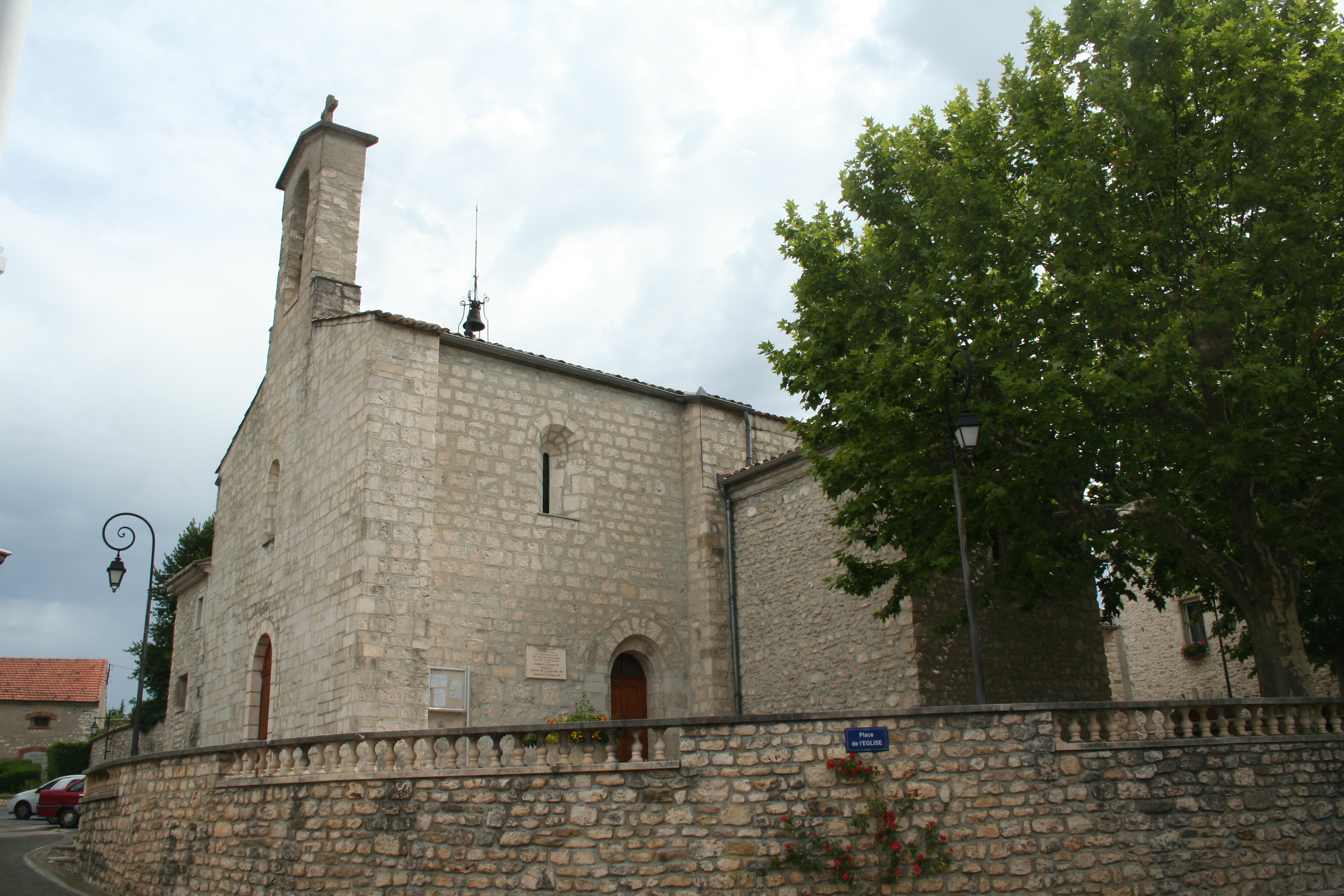
- The church of Saint-Privat-des-Vieux

- Coat of arms
- Location of Saint-Privat-des-Vieux
- Location within France Location within Occitanie
- Coordinates: 44°08′42″N 4°07′48″E
- Country: France
- Region: Occitania
- Department: Gard
- Arrondissement: Alès
- Canton: Alès-2
- Intercommunality: Alès Agglomération

Government
  - Mayor (2020–2026): Philippe Ribot
- Area^{1}: 15.8 km^{2} (6.1 sq mi)
- Elevation: 204 m (669 ft)
- Highest elevation: 285 m (935 ft)
- Lowest elevation: 129 m (423 ft)
- Population (2023): 5,703
  - Density: 361/km^{2} (935/sq mi)
- Time zone: UTC+01:00 (CET)
  - Summer (DST): UTC+02:00 (CEST)
- INSEE/Postal code: 30294 /30340
- ^{1} French Land Register data, which excludes lakes, ponds, glaciers > 1 km^{2} (0.386 sq mi or 247 acres) and river estuaries.

Saint-Privat-des-Vieux (French pronunciation: [sɛ̃ pʁiva de vjø]; Occitan: Sent Privat dels Vièlhs) is a commune in the Gard department in southern France.

== Population ==
Historical population

Year	Pop.	±% p.a.
1793	650	—
1800	313	−9.91%
1806	301	−0.65%
1821	508	+3.55%
1831	678	+2.93%
1836	699	+0.61%
1841	712	+0.37%
1846	769	+1.55%
1851	846	+1.93%
1856	883	+0.86%
1861	900	+0.38%
1866	903	+0.07%
1872	906	+0.06%
1876	927	+0.57%
1881	973	+0.97%
1886	1,025	+1.05%
1891	1,003	−0.43%
1896	1,063	+1.17%
1901	1,048	−0.28%

Year	Pop.	±% p.a.
1906	1,095	+0.88%
1911	1,144	+0.88%
1921	1,244	+0.84%
1926	1,348	+1.62%
1931	1,353	+0.07%
1936	1,268	−1.29%
1946	1,332	+0.49%
1954	1,432	+0.91%
1962	1,651	+1.79%
1968	2,020	+3.42%
1975	2,608	+3.72%
1982	3,345	+3.62%
1990	3,892	+1.91%
1999	4,064	+0.48%
2007	4,349	+0.85%
2012	4,890	+2.37%
2017	5,182	+1.17%
2023	5,703	+1.61%

Source: EHESS and INSEE (1968-2023)

== See also ==
- Communes of the Gard department
