= Servas, Gard =

Servas
- Commune
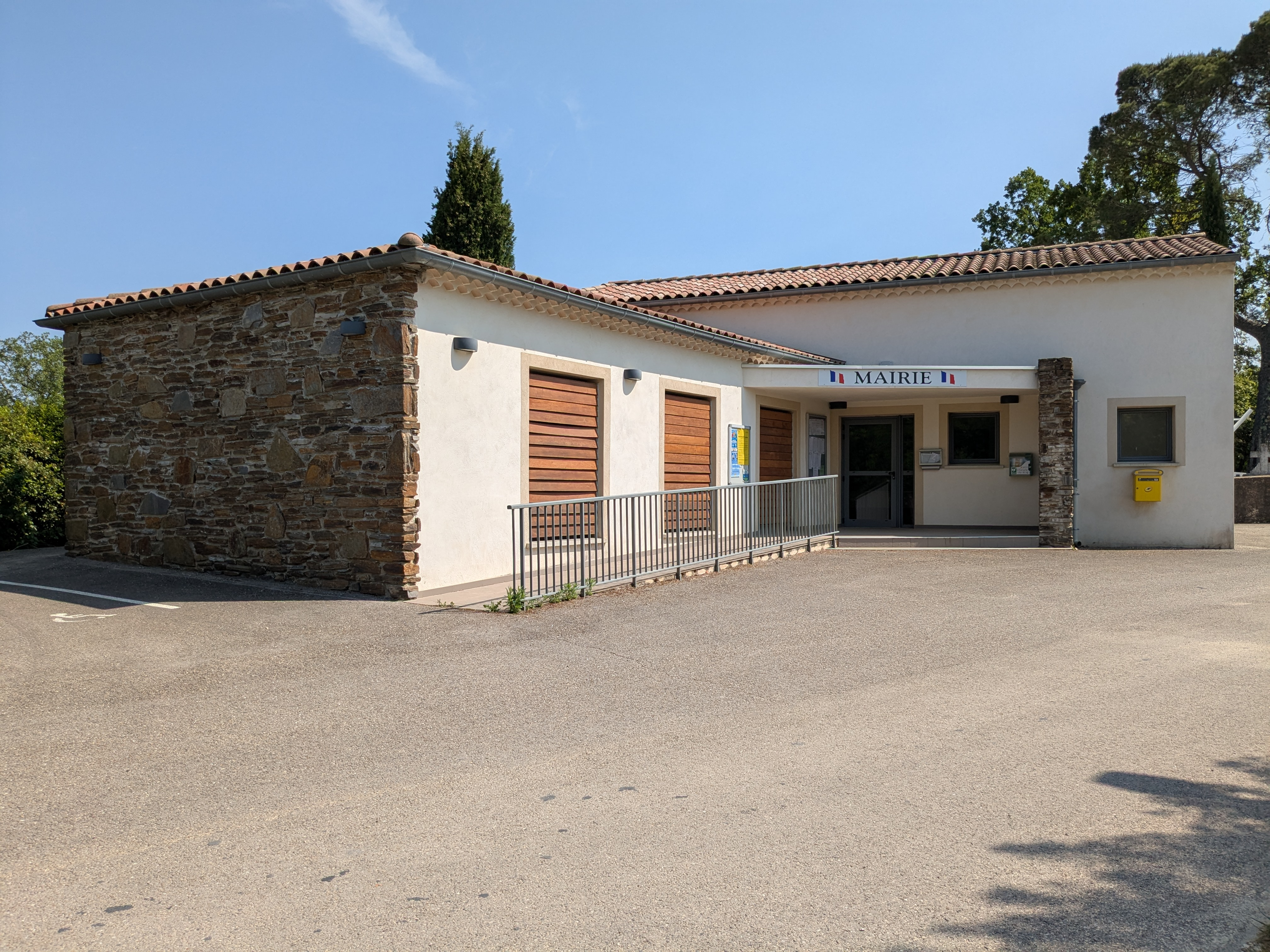
- Servas Town hall

- Coat of arms
- Location of Servas
- Location within France Location within Occitanie
- Coordinates: 44°09′30″N 4°11′48″E
- Country: France
- Region: Occitania
- Department: Gard
- Arrondissement: Alès
- Canton: Alès-2
- Intercommunality: Alès Agglomération

Government
  - Mayor (2020–2026): Roch Varin d'Ainvelle
- Area^{1}: 10.76 km^{2} (4.15 sq mi)
- Elevation: 202 m (663 ft)
- Highest elevation: 243 m (797 ft)
- Lowest elevation: 143 m (469 ft)
- Population (2023): 219
  - Density: 20.4/km^{2} (52.7/sq mi)
- Time zone: UTC+01:00 (CET)
  - Summer (DST): UTC+02:00 (CEST)
- INSEE/Postal code: 30318 /30340
- ^{1} French Land Register data, which excludes lakes, ponds, glaciers > 1 km^{2} (0.386 sq mi or 247 acres) and river estuaries.

Servas is a commune in the Gard department in Occitania, France.

== Population ==
Historical population
Year	Pop.	±% p.a.
1968	115	—
1975	127	+1.43%
1982	125	−0.23%
1990	138	+1.24%
1999	152	+1.08%
2007	198	+3.36%
2012	199	+0.10%
2017	209	+0.99%
2023	219	+0.78%
Source: INSEE

== See also ==
- Communes of the Gard department
