= Canton of Alès-2 =

Coordinates: 44.13°N 4.09°E

The canton of Alès-2 is an administrative division of the Gard department, southern France. It was created at the French canton reorganisation which came into effect in March 2015. Its seat is in Alès.

It consists of the following communes:

1. Alès (partly)
2. Belvézet
3. Bouquet
4. Brouzet-lès-Alès
5. Fons-sur-Lussan
6. Lussan
7. Mons
8. Les Plans
9. Saint-Just-et-Vacquières
10. Saint-Martin-de-Valgalgues
11. Saint-Privat-des-Vieux
12. Salindres
13. Servas
14. Seynes
15. Vallérargues
