= Mons, Gard =

Mons
- Commune
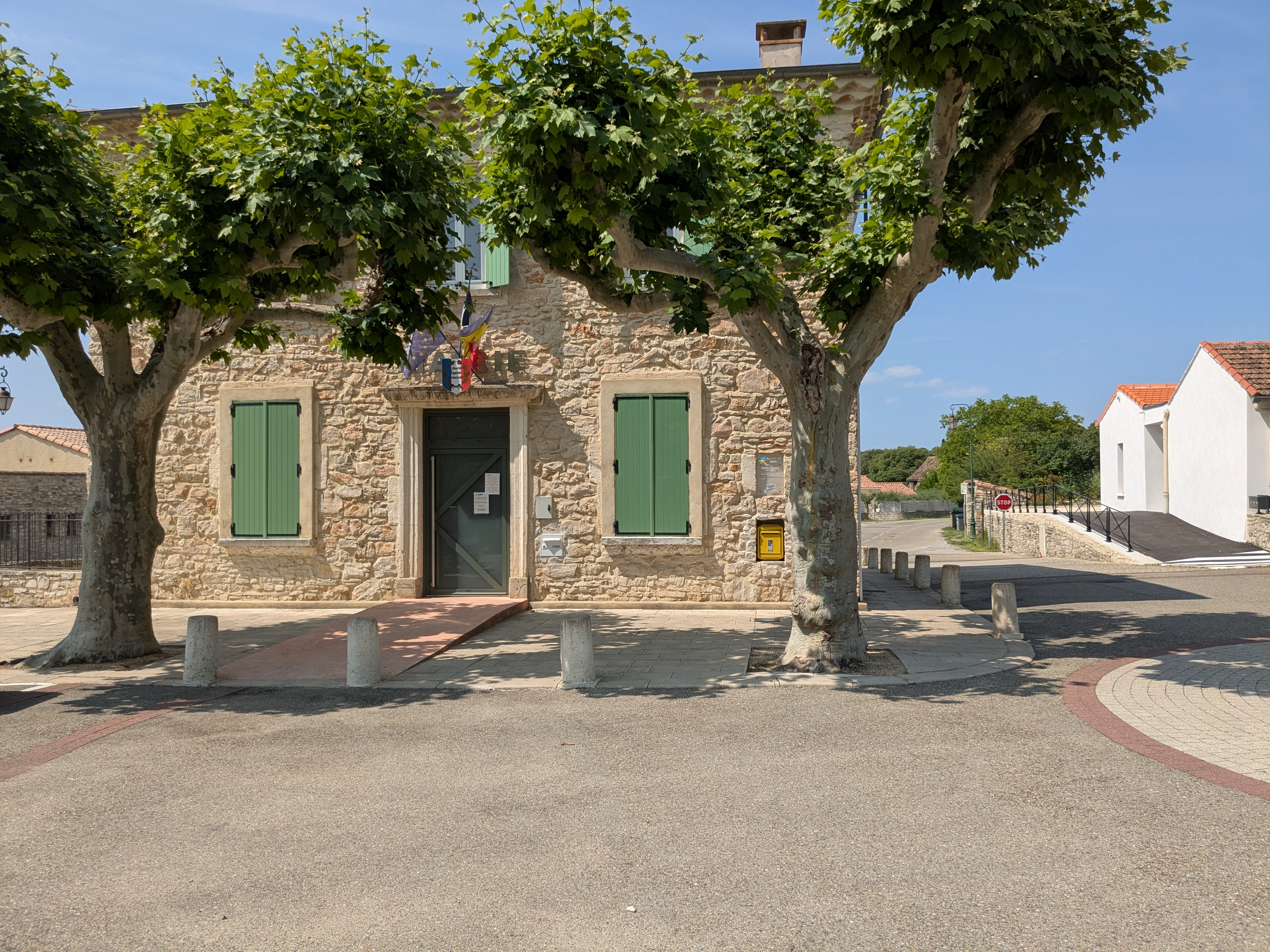
- Mons Town hall

- Coat of arms
- Location of Mons
- Location within France Location within Occitanie
- Coordinates: 44°06′56″N 4°10′30″E
- Country: France
- Region: Occitania
- Department: Gard
- Arrondissement: Alès
- Canton: Alès-2
- Intercommunality: Alès Agglomération

Government
  - Mayor (2020–2026): Gérard Banquet
- Area^{1}: 15.94 km^{2} (6.15 sq mi)
- Elevation: 179 m (587 ft)
- Highest elevation: 281 m (922 ft)
- Lowest elevation: 129 m (423 ft)
- Population (2023): 1,813
  - Density: 113.7/km^{2} (294.6/sq mi)
- Time zone: UTC+01:00 (CET)
  - Summer (DST): UTC+02:00 (CEST)
- INSEE/Postal code: 30173 /30340
- ^{1} French Land Register data, which excludes lakes, ponds, glaciers > 1 km^{2} (0.386 sq mi or 247 acres) and river estuaries.

Mons (French pronunciation: [mɔ̃s]; Occitan: Monts) is a commune in the Gard department in southern France.

== Population ==
Historical population
Year	Pop.	±% p.a.
1968	513	—
1975	644	+3.30%
1982	1,040	+7.09%
1990	1,387	+3.66%
1999	1,349	−0.31%
2007	1,439	+0.81%
2012	1,530	+1.23%
2017	1,677	+1.85%
2023	1,813	+1.31%
Source: INSEE

== See also ==
- Communes of the Gard department
