= Les Plans, Gard =

Les Plans
- Commune
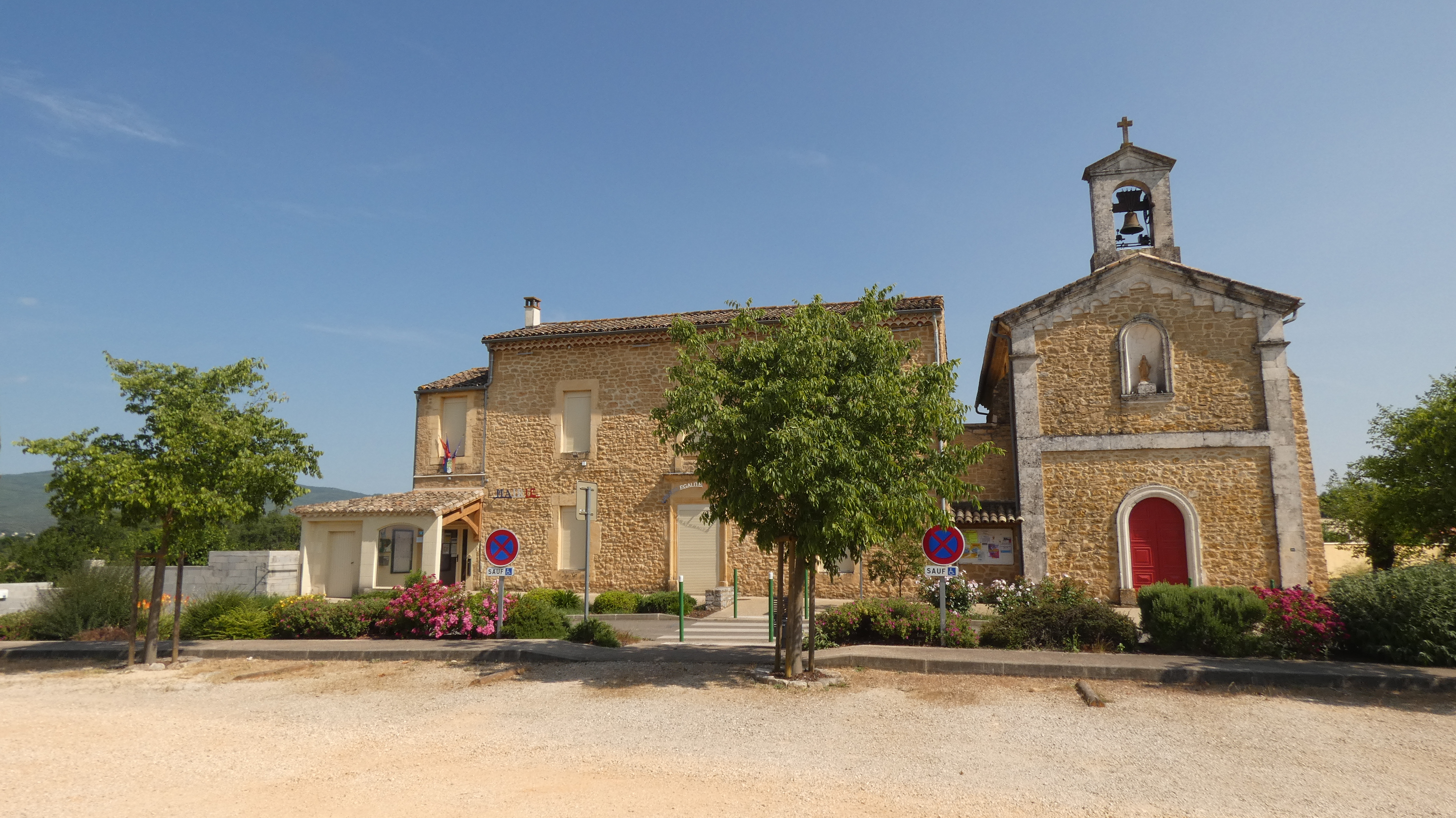
- Les Plans (Gard) Town hall

- Coat of arms
- Location of Les Plans
- Location within France Location within Occitanie
- Coordinates: 44°08′35″N 4°12′42″E
- Country: France
- Region: Occitania
- Department: Gard
- Arrondissement: Alès
- Canton: Alès-2
- Intercommunality: Alès Agglomération

Government
  - Mayor (2020–2026): Gérard Baroni
- Area^{1}: 6.15 km^{2} (2.37 sq mi)
- Elevation: 175 m (574 ft)
- Highest elevation: 263 m (863 ft)
- Lowest elevation: 147 m (482 ft)
- Population (2023): 292
  - Density: 47.5/km^{2} (123/sq mi)
- Time zone: UTC+01:00 (CET)
  - Summer (DST): UTC+02:00 (CEST)
- INSEE/Postal code: 30197 /30340
- ^{1} French Land Register data, which excludes lakes, ponds, glaciers > 1 km^{2} (0.386 sq mi or 247 acres) and river estuaries.

Les Plans (French pronunciation: [le plɑ̃]; Occitan: Los Plans) is a commune in the Gard department in southern France.

== Population ==
Historical population
Year	Pop.	±% p.a.
1968	102	—
1975	91	−1.62%
1982	138	+6.13%
1990	138	+0.00%
1999	140	+0.16%
2007	198	+4.43%
2012	242	+4.10%
2017	252	+0.81%
2023	292	+2.49%
Source: INSEE

== See also ==
- Communes of the Gard department
