= Vallérargues =

- Commune
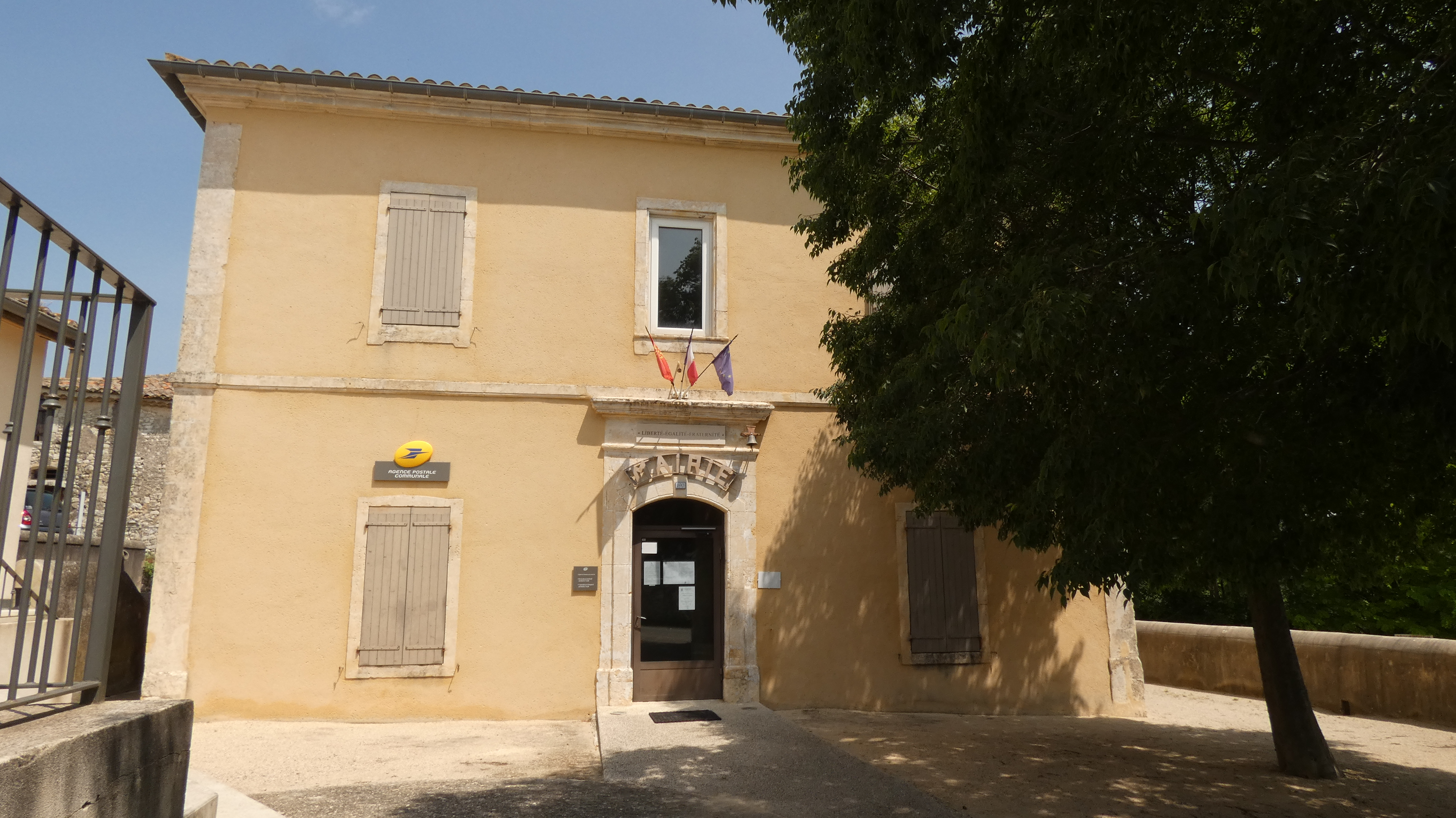
- Town hall

- Coat of arms
- Location of Vallérargues
- Location within France Location within Occitanie
- Coordinates: 44°07′57″N 4°21′08″E
- Country: France
- Region: Occitania
- Department: Gard
- Arrondissement: Nîmes
- Canton: Alès-2

Government
  - Mayor (2020–2026): Dominique Ekel
- Area^{1}: 12.73 km^{2} (4.92 sq mi)
- Elevation: 280 m (920 ft)
- Highest elevation: 330 m (1,080 ft)
- Lowest elevation: 232 m (761 ft)
- Population (2023): 132
  - Density: 10.4/km^{2} (26.9/sq mi)
- Time zone: UTC+01:00 (CET)
  - Summer (DST): UTC+02:00 (CEST)
- INSEE/Postal code: 30338 /30580
- ^{1} French Land Register data, which excludes lakes, ponds, glaciers > 1 km^{2} (0.386 sq mi or 247 acres) and river estuaries.

Vallérargues (French pronunciation: [valeʁaʁɡ]; Occitan: Valerargues) is a commune in the Gard department in southern France.

== Population ==
Historical population
Year	Pop.	±% p.a.
1968	93	—
1975	95	+0.30%
1982	96	+0.15%
1990	108	+1.48%
1999	112	+0.40%
2007	133	+2.17%
2012	141	+1.18%
2017	140	−0.14%
2023	132	−0.98%
Source: INSEE

== See also ==
- Communes of the Gard department
