= Fons-sur-Lussan =

- Commune
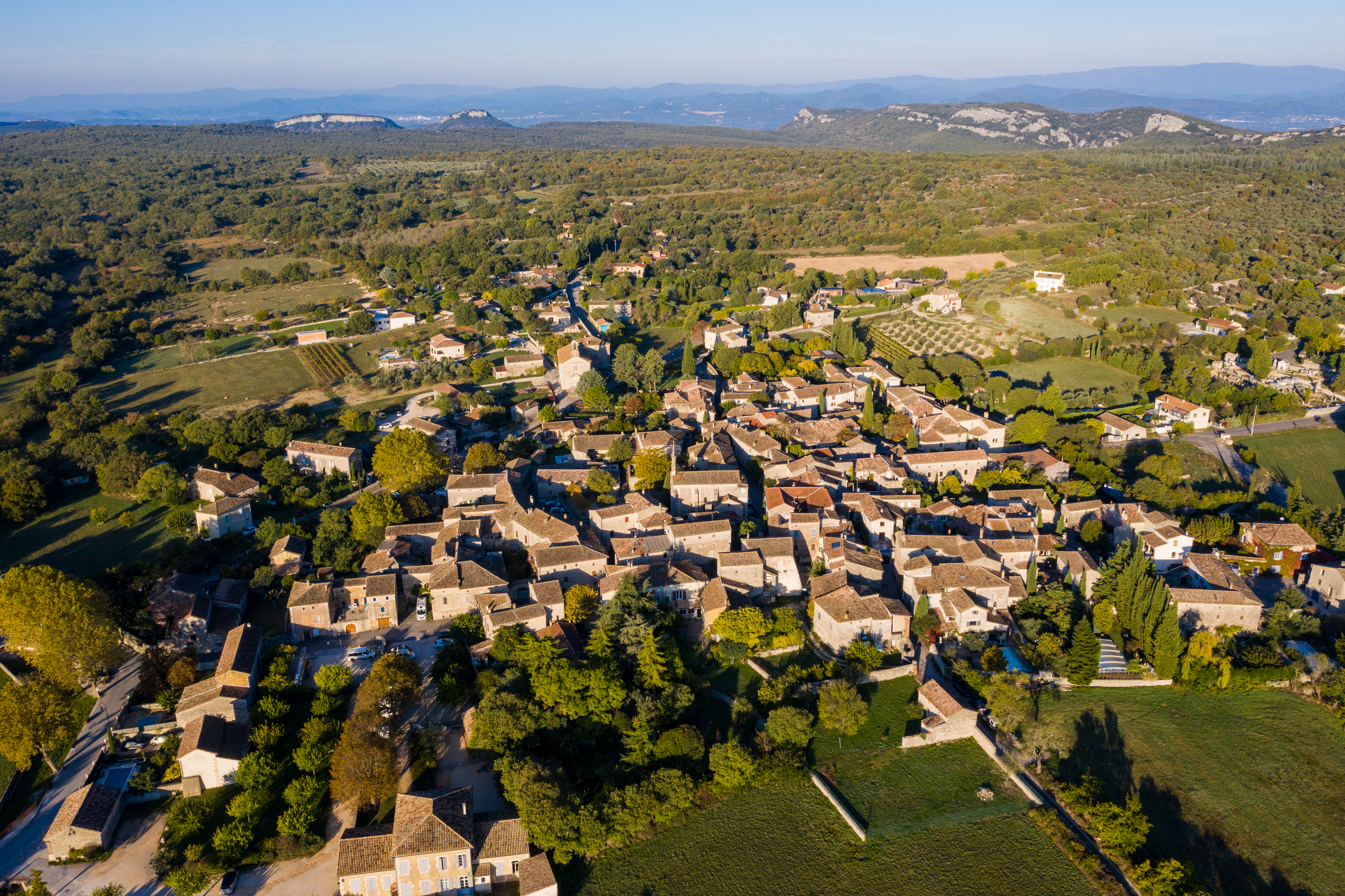

- Coat of arms
- Location of Fons-sur-Lussan
- Location within France Location within Occitanie
- Coordinates: 44°11′11″N 4°19′47″E
- Country: France
- Region: Occitania
- Department: Gard
- Arrondissement: Nîmes
- Canton: Alès-2
- Intercommunality: Pays d'Uzès

Government
  - Mayor (2020–2026): Jean-Bernard Guihermet
- Area^{1}: 10.49 km^{2} (4.05 sq mi)
- Elevation: 290 m (950 ft)
- Highest elevation: 474 m (1,555 ft)
- Lowest elevation: 268 m (879 ft)
- Population (2023): 241
  - Density: 23.0/km^{2} (59.5/sq mi)
- Time zone: UTC+01:00 (CET)
  - Summer (DST): UTC+02:00 (CEST)
- INSEE/Postal code: 30113 /30580
- ^{1} French Land Register data, which excludes lakes, ponds, glaciers > 1 km^{2} (0.386 sq mi or 247 acres) and river estuaries.

Fons-sur-Lussan (French pronunciation: [fɔ̃ syʁ lysɑ̃], literally Fons on Lussan; Occitan: Fonts de Lussan) is a commune in the Gard department in southern France.

== Population ==
Historical population
Year	Pop.	±% p.a.
1968	133	—
1975	123	−1.11%
1982	123	+0.00%
1990	134	+1.08%
1999	171	+2.75%
2007	218	+3.08%
2012	250	+2.78%
2017	237	−1.06%
2023	241	+0.28%
Source: INSEE

== See also ==
- Communes of the Gard department
