= Lussan-Adeilhac =

- Commune
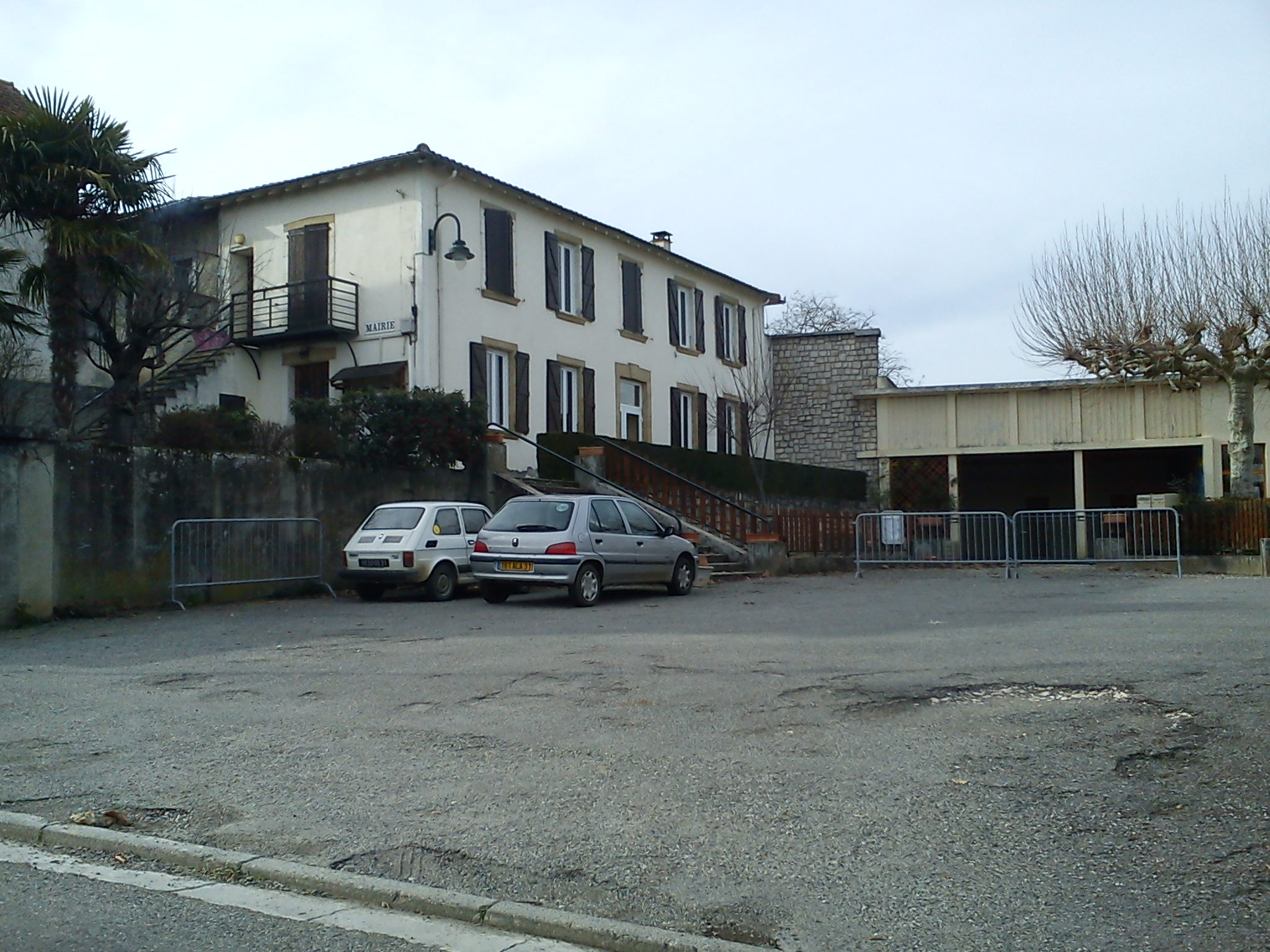
- The town hall in Lussan-Adeilhac
- Location of Lussan-Adeilhac
- Location within France Location within Occitanie
- Coordinates: 43°18′00″N 0°56′29″E
- Country: France
- Region: Occitania
- Department: Haute-Garonne
- Arrondissement: Muret
- Canton: Cazères

Government
  - Mayor (2020–2026): Guy Saint-Blancat
- Area^{1}: 12.62 km^{2} (4.87 sq mi)
- Elevation: 375 m (1,230 ft)
- Highest elevation: 374 m (1,227 ft)
- Lowest elevation: 263 m (863 ft)
- Population (2023): 236
  - Density: 18.7/km^{2} (48.4/sq mi)
- Time zone: UTC+01:00 (CET)
  - Summer (DST): UTC+02:00 (CEST)
- INSEE/Postal code: 31309 /31430
- ^{1} French Land Register data, which excludes lakes, ponds, glaciers > 1 km^{2} (0.386 sq mi or 247 acres) and river estuaries.

Lussan-Adeilhac (French pronunciation: [lysɑ̃ adɛjak]; Occitan: Luçan e Adelhac) is a commune in the Haute-Garonne department in southwestern France.

== Population ==
Historical population
Year	Pop.	±% p.a.
1968	228	—
1975	230	+0.12%
1982	192	−2.55%
1990	185	−0.46%
1999	191	+0.36%
2007	202	+0.70%
2012	232	+2.81%
2017	227	−0.43%
2023	236	+0.65%
Source: INSEE

== See also ==
- Communes of the Haute-Garonne department
