= Joseph Szabo (photographer) =

American photographer

- Born: 1944 (age 81–82); Toledo, Ohio. U.S.
- Education: Pratt Institute (MFA)
- Occupation: Photographer
- Known for: Almost Grown and Teenage, specifically "Priscilla"

Joseph Szabo (born 1944) is an American photographer whose work is about adolescence.

== Life and career ==
Szabo was born in Toledo, Ohio. He studied photography at the Pratt Institute where he received his MFA. He taught photography at Malverne High School in Long Island, New York from 1972 to 1999 and he continues to teach at the International Centre of Photography (ICP). Szabo is the recipient of a National Endowment for the Arts Fellowship and his work resides in the permanent collections of the Metropolitan Museum of Art, Yale University, ICP and the Bibliothèque nationale in Paris.

He is most notable for his photographs of American youth taken during the 1970s and collected in the books Almost Grown and Teenage. His photograph "Priscilla" was featured as the cover of alternative rock band Dinosaur Jr's 1991 album Green Mind. Szabo made a body of work on Rolling Stones fans photographed at a concert in Philadelphia in 1978.

He currently lives in Amityville, New York with his wife Nancy.

== Publications ==
=== Publications by Szabo ===
- Almost Grown. 1978. New York: Harmony. ISBN 0-517-53327-8. Photographs by Szabo and poetry collected by Alan Ziegler. With a foreword by Cornell Capa.
- Teenage. Greybull, 2003. ISBN 978-0972778879.
- Rolling Stones Fans. PAMbook, 2007. ISBN 978-0980369601. Paperback.
  - Rolling Stones Fans. Damiani, 2015. ISBN 978-8862083997. Hardback.
- Jones Beach. Harry N. Abrams, 2010. ISBN 978-0810980167. With a foreword by Bruce Weber and an introduction by Vince Aletti.
- Lifeguard. Damiani, 2018. ISBN 978-8862085427.

=== Publications with contributions by Szabo ===
- Contatti. Provini d'Autore = Choosing the best photo by using the contact sheet. Vol. I. Edited by Giammaria De Gasperis. Rome: Postcart, 2012. ISBN 978-88-86795-87-6.
