= Lussan, Gard =

Lussan
- Commune
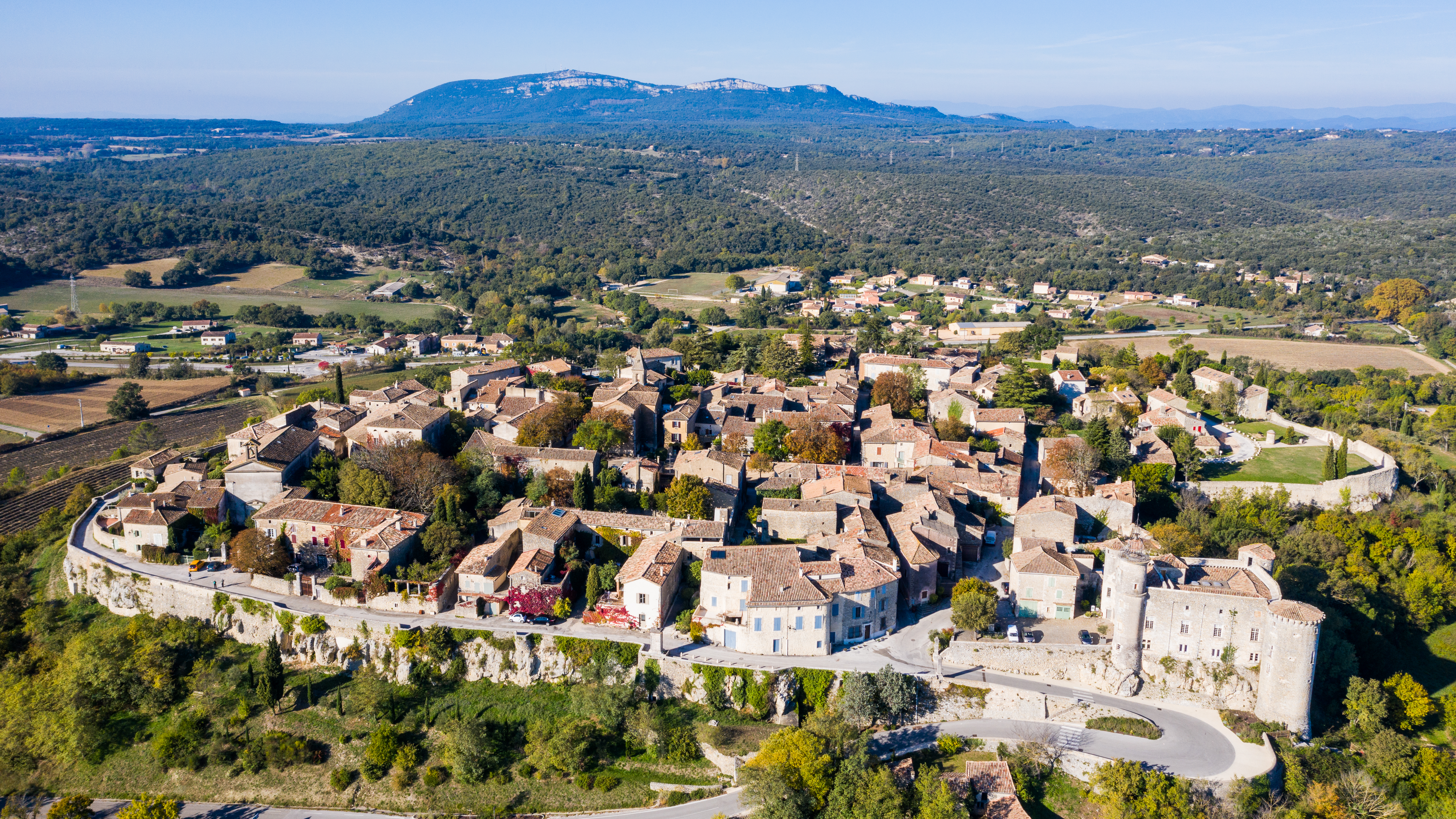
- A general view of Lussan

- Coat of arms
- Location of Lussan
- Location within France Location within Occitanie
- Coordinates: 44°09′14″N 4°22′01″E
- Country: France
- Region: Occitania
- Department: Gard
- Arrondissement: Nîmes
- Canton: Alès-2

Government
  - Mayor (2020–2026): Jean-Marc François
- Area^{1}: 46.92 km^{2} (18.12 sq mi)
- Elevation: 300 m (980 ft)
- Highest elevation: 345 m (1,132 ft)
- Lowest elevation: 110 m (360 ft)
- Population (2023): 545
  - Density: 11.6/km^{2} (30.1/sq mi)
- Time zone: UTC+01:00 (CET)
  - Summer (DST): UTC+02:00 (CEST)
- INSEE/Postal code: 30151 /30580
- ^{1} French Land Register data, which excludes lakes, ponds, glaciers > 1 km^{2} (0.386 sq mi or 247 acres) and river estuaries.

Lussan (French pronunciation: [lysɑ̃]; Occitan: Luçan) is a commune in the Gard department in southern France. It is a member of Les Plus Beaux Villages de France (The Most Beautiful Villages of France) Association.

== Population ==
Historical population
Year	Pop.	±% p.a.
1968	268	—
1975	294	+1.33%
1982	331	+1.71%
1990	357	+0.95%
1999	402	+1.33%
2007	450	+1.42%
2012	503	+2.25%
2017	486	−0.69%
2023	545	+1.93%
Source: INSEE

== See also ==
- Communes of the Gard department
