= Nyúl =

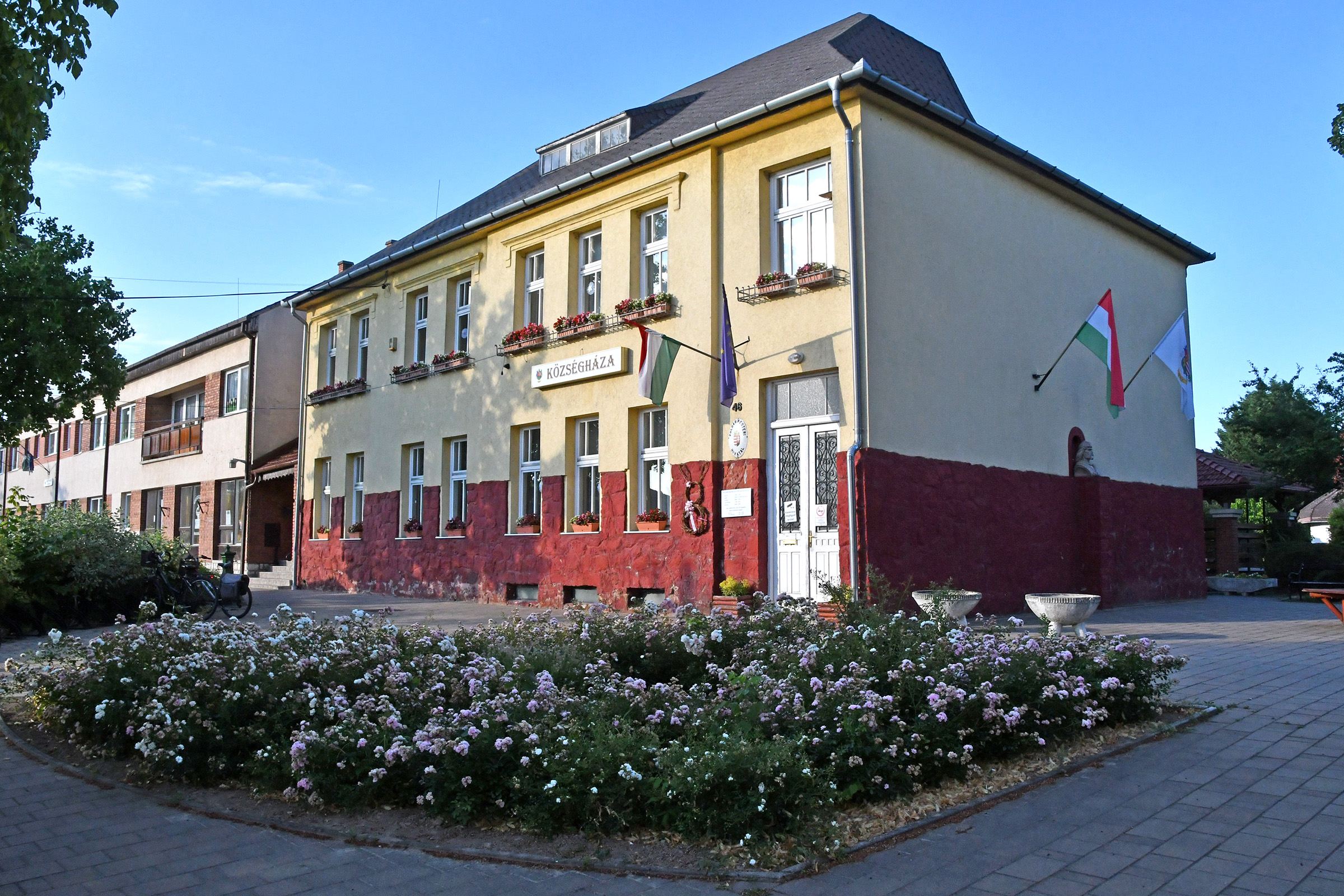
- Village hall

- Flag Coat of arms

- Location of Győr-Moson-Sopron county in Hungary

- Location of Nyúl
- Coordinates: 47.58129°N 17.68066°E
- Country: Hungary
- County: Győr-Moson-Sopron

Area
  - Total: 25.14 km^{2} (9.71 sq mi)

Population (2004)
  - Total: 3,913
  - Density: 155.64/km^{2} (403.1/sq mi)
- Time zone: UTC+1 (CET)
  - Summer (DST): UTC+2 (CEST)
- Postal code: 9082
- Area code: 96

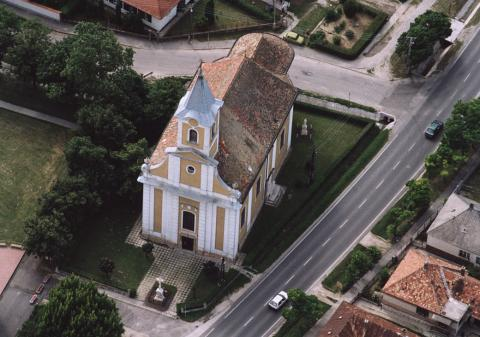
Aerial photograph of Nyúl

Nyúl is a village in Győr-Moson-Sopron county, Hungary. Its name means rabbit or hare in Hungarian.
