= Chaboillez =

Chaboillez is a French-Canadian surname. It may refer to:

== People ==
- Augustin Chaboillez, Canadian priest of Co-Cathedral of Saint-Antoine-de-Padoue (Montreal), 1806–1834
- Charles Chaboillez (1736–1808), French Canadian fur trader
- Louis Chaboillez (1766–1813), notary and politician in Lower Canada
- Marie-Marguerite Chaboillez (born 1775), daughter of Charles Chaboillez and wife of Simon McTavish

== Other uses ==
- Chaboillez River, a river of Quebec
- Chaboillez Square, a town square in Montreal, Canada
