= Château de Florac =

Castle in Occitania, France

Coordinates: 44°19′23″N 3°35′37″E

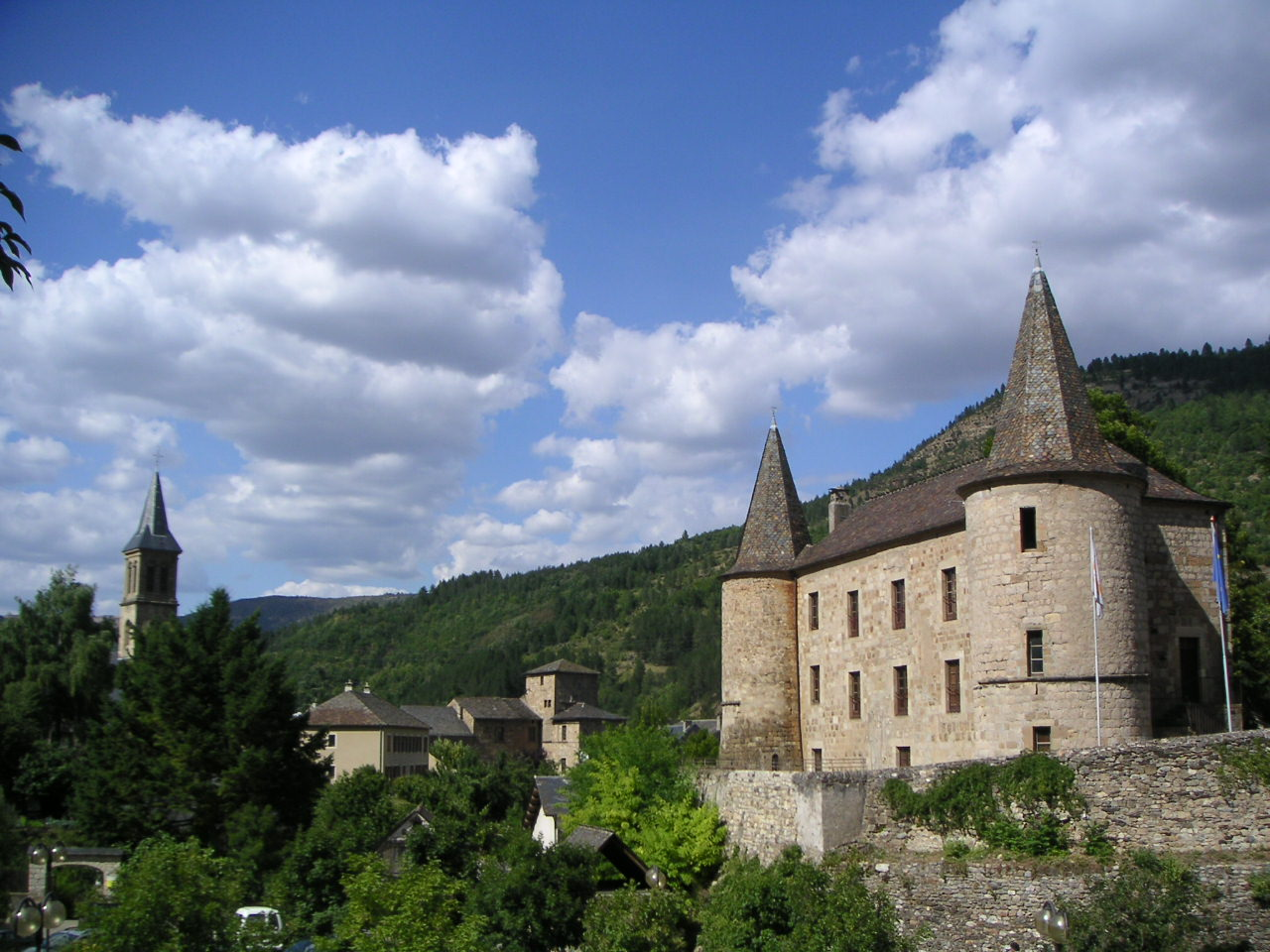
Florac castle

The Château de Florac is a castle, originally built in the 13th century and then rebuilt in the 17th century, located in the French town of Florac, in Lozère, in south-central France.

It originally belonged to the Barony of Anduze and passed through a number of feudal families. The castle was entirely rebuilt in 1652 after the Wars of Religion. During the French Revolution, the castle was turned into a "salt loft" for storing salt. It was then used as a prison in the 19th century.

== Modern use ==
Since 1976, the castle has been the headquarters of the Cévennes National Park, who restored it.

The ground and first floors house an exhibition on the National Park (landscape, flora, fauna and activities connected with the park). The information centre has details of hiking, guided tours, accommodation and écomusées (open-air museums) in the park.

== Gallery ==
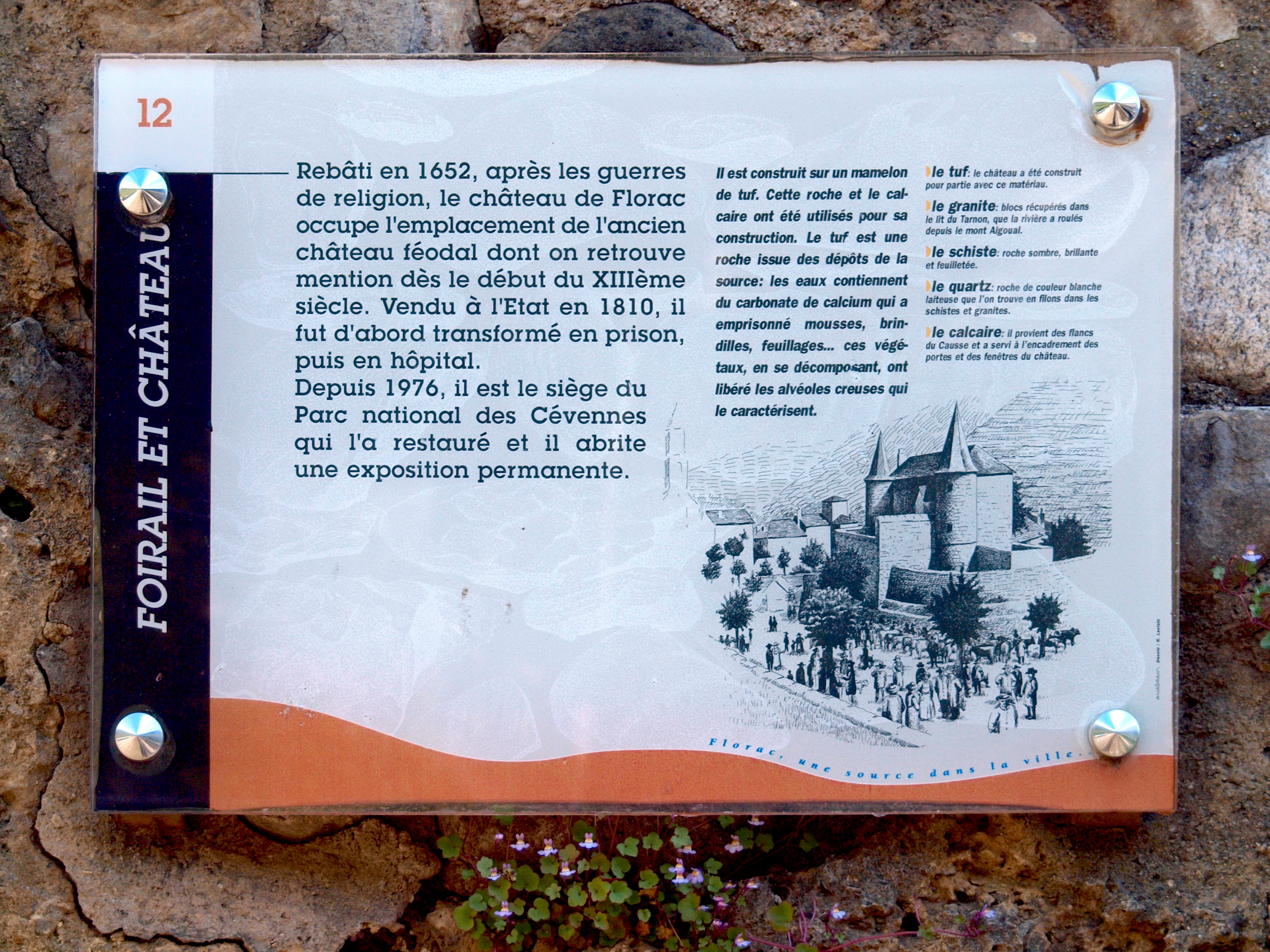
Information panel

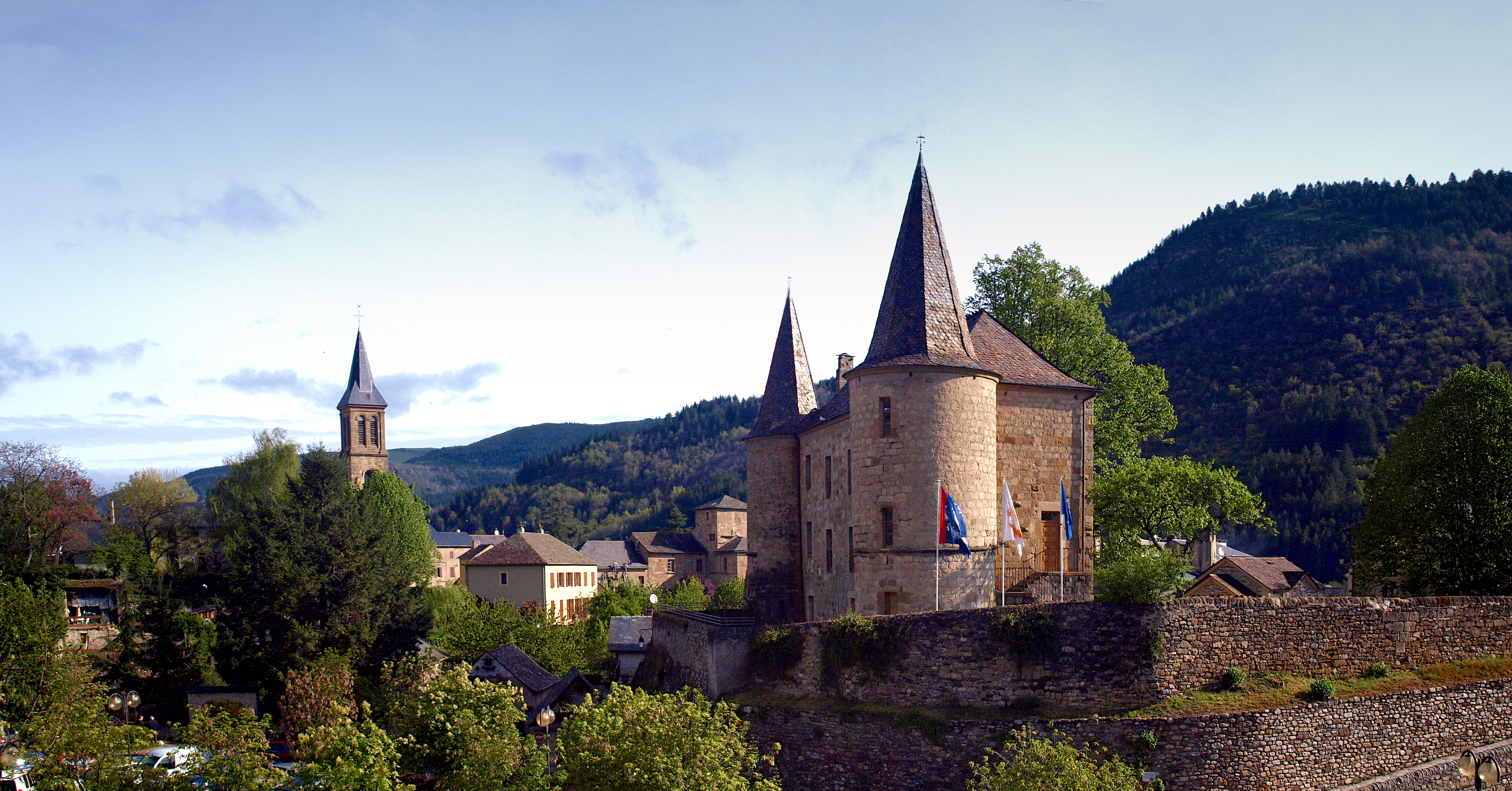
Panorama

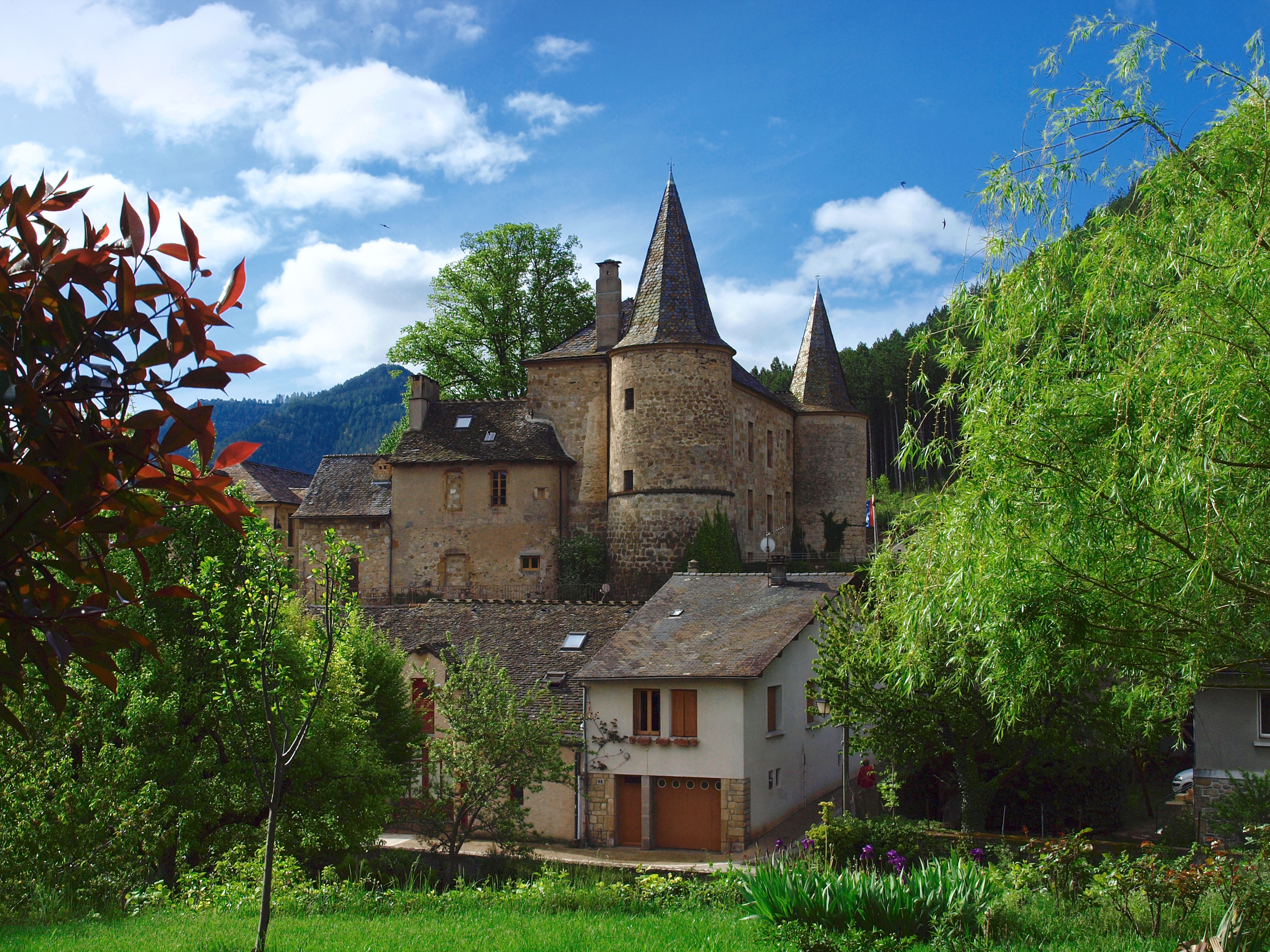
View of the château

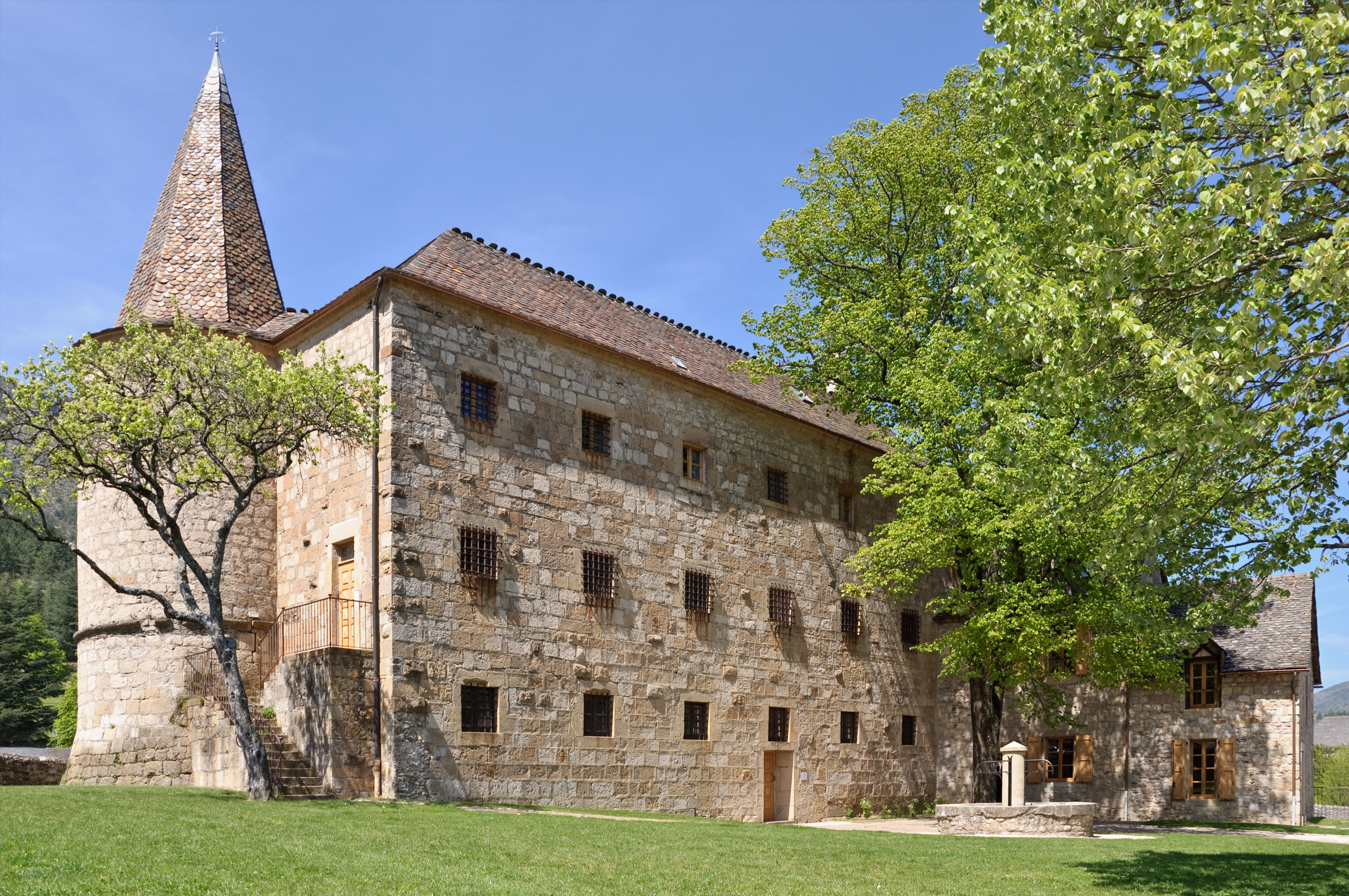
The former prison

== See also ==
- List of castles in France
