= Pierre Gendron =

Pierre Gendron may refer to:

- Pierre Gendron (academic) (1916–1984), Canadian academic
- Pierre Gendron (actor) (1896–1956), American actor and screenwriter
- Pierre Gendron (producer) (born 1952), Canadian film producer
- Pierre-Samuel Gendron (1828–1889), notary and political figure in Quebec, Canada
