= Montreal Planetarium =

Montreal Planetarium may refer to:

- Dow Planetarium, known in later years as the Montreal Planetarium, open from 1966–2011 on Saint Jacques Street, Montreal
- Montreal Planetarium (2013), opened in 2013 at the Space for Life complex, which replaced the Dow Planetarium
