= James Robinson Love =

- Born: 22 June 1836; Fintona, Tyrone, Ireland
- Died: 25 August 1914 (aged 78); Wahroonga
- Occupations: merchant, diplomat
- Title: Mr James Robinson Love
- Parent(s): William Love and Ellinor Robinson

James Robinson Love (1836–1914) was an Australian merchant and founder of J. R. Love & Co Ltd and Kinkara Tea.

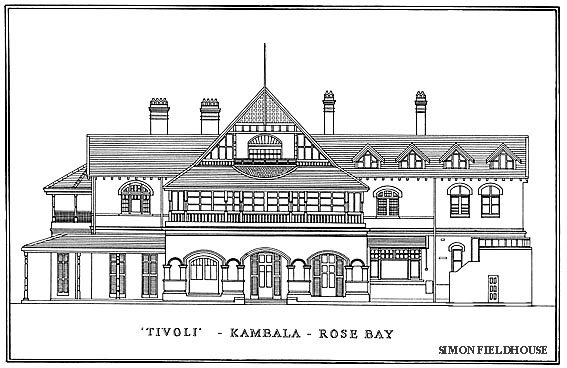
"Tivoli" - Rose Bay

Love was the son of the politician William Love and Ellinor Robinson, both immigrants from Ireland, and brother of magistrate Milton Love. He resided for many years in "Tivoli", the original residence of Captain William Dumaresq on New South Head Road, Rose Bay, which later became Kambala School. From 1903 he acted as Greek consul in Sydney and consul-general for Greece in New South Wales.

He died at Wahroonga on 25 August 1914 (aged 78).
