= Cadran solaire =

1967 sculpture in Montreal, Quebec, Canada

- Artist: Herman J. van der Heide
- Year: 1967
- Medium: Sculpture
- Subject: Sundial
- Location: Montreal, Quebec, Canada; 45°33′39″N 73°32′59″W

The Cadran solaire ("Sun Dial") is an outdoor 1967 steel and aluminum sundial sculpture by Dutch artist Herman J. van der Heide, installed outside Montreal's Rio Tinto Alcan Planetarium, in Quebec, Canada. The sculpture was previously installed outside the Dow Planetarium, in Chaboillez Square, but was relocated in October 2013.
