= Augustine Soubeiran =

Australian headmistress, French patriot (1858–1933)

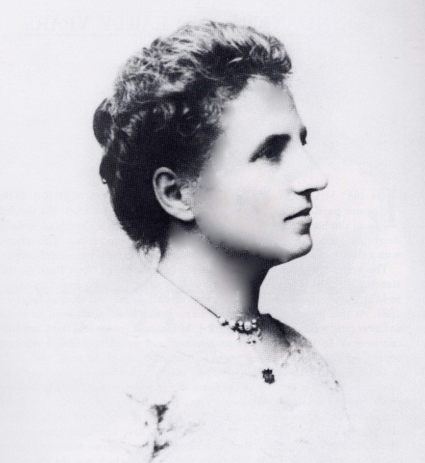
- Born: 30 October 1858; Saint-Jean-du-Gard
- Died: 31 May 1933 (aged 74); Darlinghurst
- Known for: founding a school and an Australian-French society
- Partner: Louisa Gurney

Augustine Soubeiran (30 October 1858 – 31 May 1933) was a French-Australian educator. She was a co-principal of Kambala School in Sydney and she founded an Australian-French society. She was awarded the Légion d'honneur after her death.

== Life ==
Soubeiran was born in Saint-Jean-du-Gard in 1858 in southern France. In 1870 she was in Paris and after school in Lausanne she emigrated to Australia after her parents died.

She returned to France but she was back in Australia in 1886 where she became a teacher at a school named Fernbank in Sydney. The school had been started by Louisa Jane Gurney who was a friend she had previously worked with. Gurney was the daughter of Thomas William Henry Gurney and Theophila, (née Hope) and Sydney University's mathematics Professor Theodore Thomas Gurney was her brother. In 1891 they became co-principals of the school as it moved to Kambala and took the name of its new location. Soubeiran had been to finishing school in Switzerland and the new school aspired to create polite girls who could pass examinations. She taught French at the school and at the Ascham School nearby. At their boarding school she was the housekeeper and she supervised the (French) cookery.

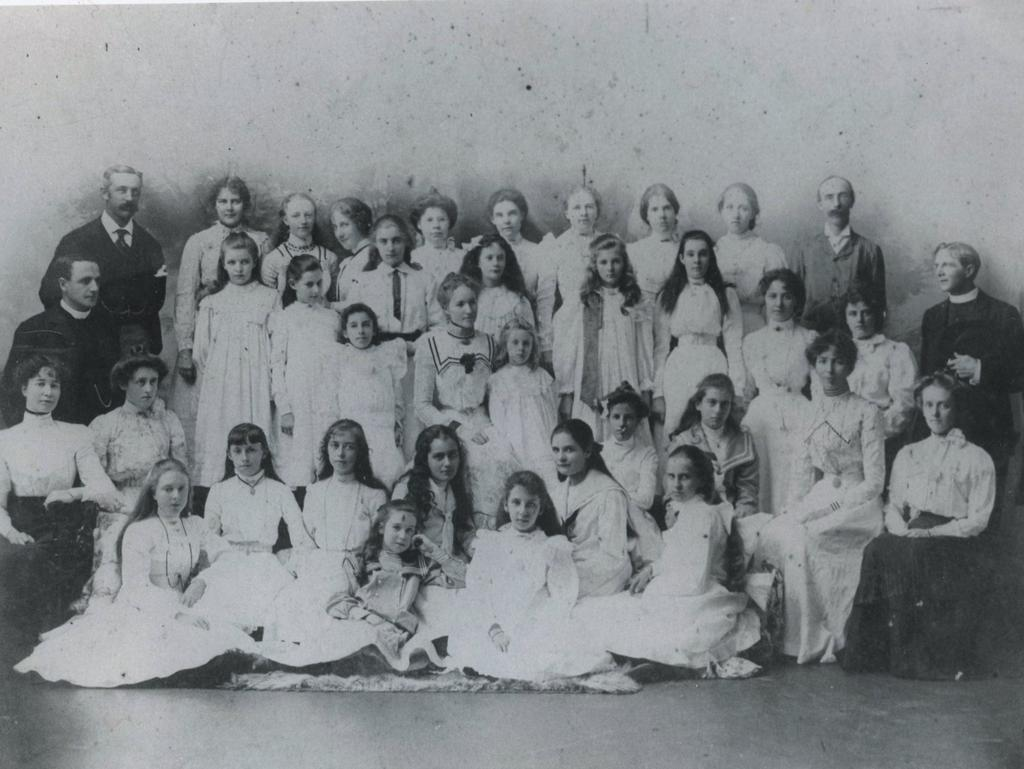
Kambala School circa 1896. Louisa Gurney is in the centre and Soubeiran is 2nd from right in 2nd row

In 1895 she was one of the founders of the Alliance France which awarded prizes for spoken French.

She and Louisa sold the school in 1914 to Clara and Mary Jane Roseby. Together they created the French-Australian League of Help as France and Australia became involved in World War One. Souberain became the Secretary of the League of Help. In 1917 she went to Paris to supervise the distribution of funds and clothes from Australia.

She was twice President of the Alliance France de Sydney.

She and Gurney moved to Bowral where she lived in declining health.

Soubeiran died in Darlinghurst in 1933 and she was awarded the Légion d'honneur later that year. The square where she was born in Saint-Jean-du-Gard was named, Place Augustine Soubeiran, after her. The idea for the naming was the 2021 biography by Nelly Duret. Duret noted that Soubeiran's town had no public space named for a woman.
