= Saint-Jean-du-Gard =

- Commune
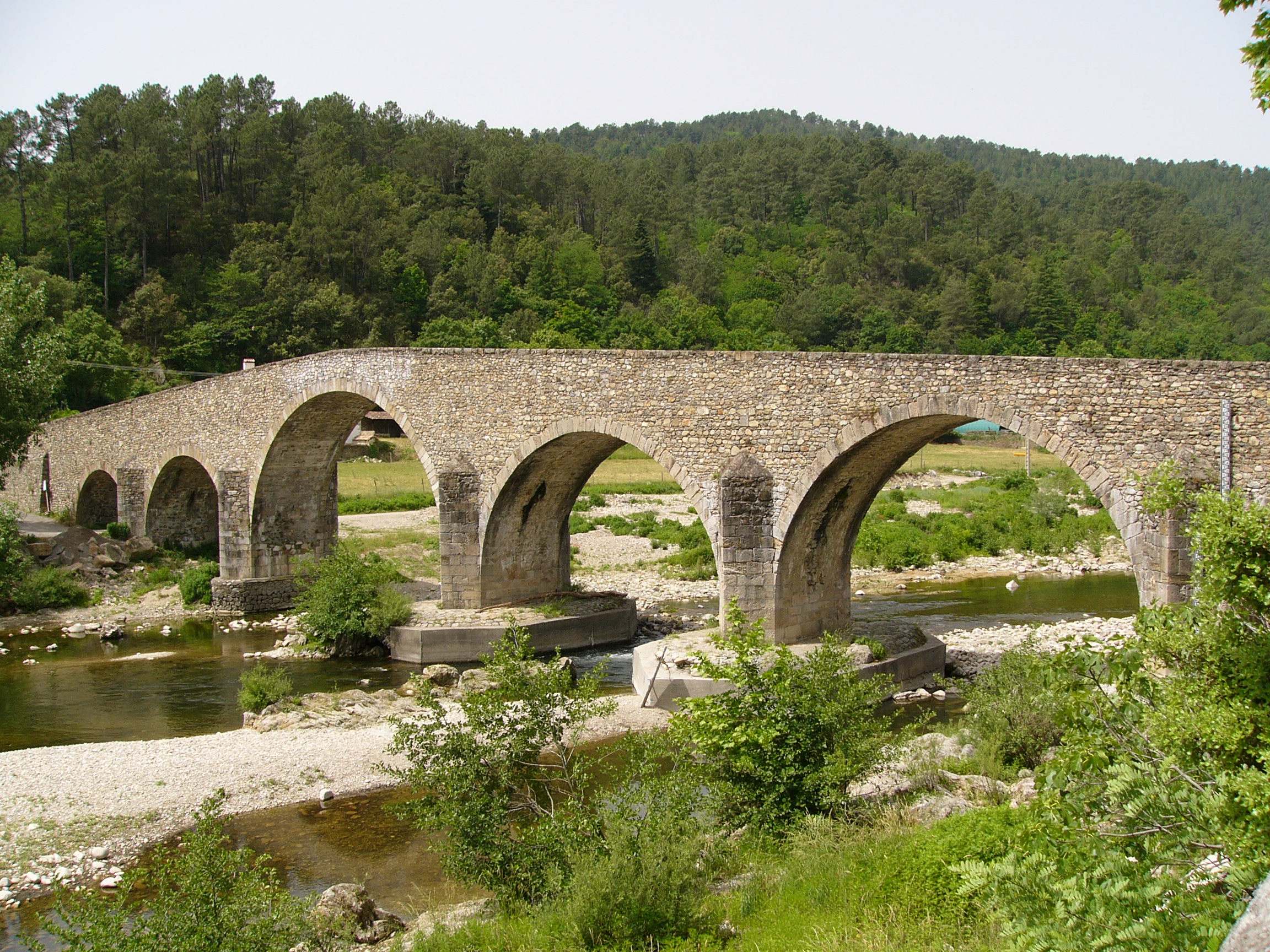
- Bridge over the Gardon

- Coat of arms
- Location of Saint-Jean-du-Gard
- Location within France Location within Occitanie
- Coordinates: 44°06′20″N 3°53′13″E
- Country: France
- Region: Occitania
- Department: Gard
- Arrondissement: Alès
- Canton: La Grand-Combe
- Intercommunality: Alès Agglomération

Government
  - Mayor (2023–2026): Pierre Aiguillon
- Area^{1}: 41.64 km^{2} (16.08 sq mi)
- Elevation: 189 m (620 ft)
- Highest elevation: 817 m (2,680 ft)
- Lowest elevation: 168 m (551 ft)
- Population (2023): 2,586
  - Density: 62.10/km^{2} (160.8/sq mi)
- Time zone: UTC+01:00 (CET)
  - Summer (DST): UTC+02:00 (CEST)
- INSEE/Postal code: 30269 /30270
- ^{1} French Land Register data, which excludes lakes, ponds, glaciers > 1 km^{2} (0.386 sq mi or 247 acres) and river estuaries.

Saint-Jean-du-Gard (Occitan: Sant Joan de Gardonenca) is a commune in the Gard department in southern France.

== History ==
This city of the Cévennes, first mentioned in a 12th-century papal bull (San Johannis de Gardonnenca cum villa), was very much influenced by Protestantism in the 16th century and became the Mecca of the camisards' resistance.

Thanks to the silk industry, the village experienced a period of prosperity that lasted from the 19th century to the 20th century. This city now owes much of its economy to tourism. A heritage railway runs from Saint-Jean-du-Gard to Anduze with a stop at the Bambouseraie de Prafrance, which attracts 150,000 tourists a year.

The Scottish author Robert Louis Stevenson reached the town on 3 October 1878, as recounted in his book Travels with a Donkey in the Cévennes. Here he sold his donkey Modestine, and took a stagecoach to Alès:

It was a long descent upon St. Jean du Gard, and we met no one but a carter, visible afar off by the glint of the moon on his extinguished lantern. Before ten o'clock we had got in and were at supper; fifteen miles and a stiff hill in little beyond six hours! ... On examination, on the morning of October 4th, Modestine was pronounced unfit for travel. She would need at least two days' repose according to the ostler; but I was now eager to reach Alais for my letters; and, being in a civilised country of stagecoaches, I determined to sell my lady-friend and be off by the diligence that afternoon. Our yesterday's march, with the testimony of the driver who had pursued us up the long hill of St. Pierre, spread a favourable notion of my donkey's capabilities. Intending purchasers were aware of an unrivalled opportunity. Before ten I had an offer of twenty-five francs; and before noon, after a desperate engagement, I sold her, saddle and all, for five-and-thirty. The pecuniary gain is not obvious, but I had bought freedom into the bargain.

The Robert Louis Stevenson Trail (GR 70), a popular long-distance path following Stevenson's approximate route, finishes in the town at a fountain built to commemorate Stevenson's arrival.

== Geography ==
=== Climate ===
Saint-Jean-du-Gard has a hot-summer Mediterranean climate (Köppen climate classification Csa). The average annual temperature in Saint-Jean-du-Gard is 13.8 °C (56.8 °F). The average annual rainfall is 1,437.7 mm (56.60 in) with November as the wettest month. The temperatures are highest on average in July, at around 23.1 °C (73.6 °F), and lowest in January, at around 5.8 °C (42.4 °F). The highest temperature ever recorded in Saint-Jean-du-Gard was 43.4 °C (110.1 °F) on 28 June 2019; the coldest temperature ever recorded was −12.4 °C (9.7 °F) on 12 February 2012.

Climate data for Saint-Jean-du-Gard (1991−2020 normals, extremes 1989−present)
Month	Jan	Feb	Mar	Apr	May	Jun	Jul	Aug	Sep	Oct	Nov	Dec	Year
Record high °C (°F)	22.9 (73.2)	24.3 (75.7)	27.5 (81.5)	31.4 (88.5)	35.4 (95.7)	43.4 (110.1)	39.4 (102.9)	41.7 (107.1)	37.6 (99.7)	32.5 (90.5)	23.9 (75.0)	22.0 (71.6)	43.4 (110.1)
Mean daily maximum °C (°F)	10.6 (51.1)	12.3 (54.1)	16.2 (61.2)	18.9 (66.0)	23.0 (73.4)	27.6 (81.7)	30.7 (87.3)	30.5 (86.9)	25.3 (77.5)	19.6 (67.3)	14.3 (57.7)	10.9 (51.6)	20.0 (68.0)
Daily mean °C (°F)	5.8 (42.4)	6.6 (43.9)	9.9 (49.8)	12.5 (54.5)	16.3 (61.3)	20.4 (68.7)	23.1 (73.6)	22.8 (73.0)	18.4 (65.1)	14.3 (57.7)	9.4 (48.9)	6.3 (43.3)	13.8 (56.8)
Mean daily minimum °C (°F)	1.1 (34.0)	0.9 (33.6)	3.5 (38.3)	6.2 (43.2)	9.7 (49.5)	13.1 (55.6)	15.4 (59.7)	15.0 (59.0)	11.6 (52.9)	8.9 (48.0)	4.6 (40.3)	1.7 (35.1)	7.6 (45.7)
Record low °C (°F)	−10.0 (14.0)	−12.4 (9.7)	−11.1 (12.0)	−3.6 (25.5)	0.0 (32.0)	4.9 (40.8)	7.0 (44.6)	6.5 (43.7)	3.8 (38.8)	−3.1 (26.4)	−8.4 (16.9)	−11.5 (11.3)	−12.4 (9.7)
Average precipitation mm (inches)	117.9 (4.64)	79.4 (3.13)	97.4 (3.83)	118.4 (4.66)	113.3 (4.46)	60.1 (2.37)	47.6 (1.87)	64.0 (2.52)	173.3 (6.82)	211.9 (8.34)	213.7 (8.41)	140.7 (5.54)	1,437.7 (56.60)
Average precipitation days (≥ 1.0 mm)	8.4	6.1	5.9	7.7	8.1	5.7	5.0	5.1	6.3	10.2	9.5	8.4	86.4
Source: Météo-France

== Population ==
Historical population

Year	Pop.	±% p.a.
1793	4,134	—
1800	3,105	−4.01%
1806	3,755	+3.22%
1821	3,862	+0.19%
1831	4,128	+0.67%
1836	4,296	+0.80%
1841	4,192	−0.49%
1846	4,193	+0.00%
1851	4,487	+1.36%
1856	4,450	−0.17%
1861	4,240	−0.96%
1866	3,957	−1.37%
1872	3,885	−0.31%
1876	3,978	+0.59%
1881	3,659	−1.66%
1886	3,712	+0.29%
1891	3,586	−0.69%
1896	3,290	−1.71%
1901	3,228	−0.38%

Year	Pop.	±% p.a.
1906	3,582	+2.10%
1911	3,308	−1.58%
1921	2,804	−1.64%
1926	2,757	−0.34%
1931	2,577	−1.34%
1936	2,445	−1.05%
1946	2,437	−0.03%
1954	2,442	+0.03%
1962	2,437	−0.03%
1968	2,427	−0.07%
1975	2,378	−0.29%
1982	2,423	+0.27%
1990	2,441	+0.09%
1999	2,563	+0.54%
2007	2,655	+0.44%
2012	2,696	+0.31%
2017	2,433	−2.03%
2023	2,586	+1.02%

Source: EHESS and INSEE (1968-2023)

== Notable residents ==
Augustine Soubeiran was born here in 1858 and she founded a school and a society in Sydney. Place Augustine Subeiran is named for her.

== See also ==
- Communes of the Gard department
- List of works by Auguste Carli
