= Kambala School =

Kambala

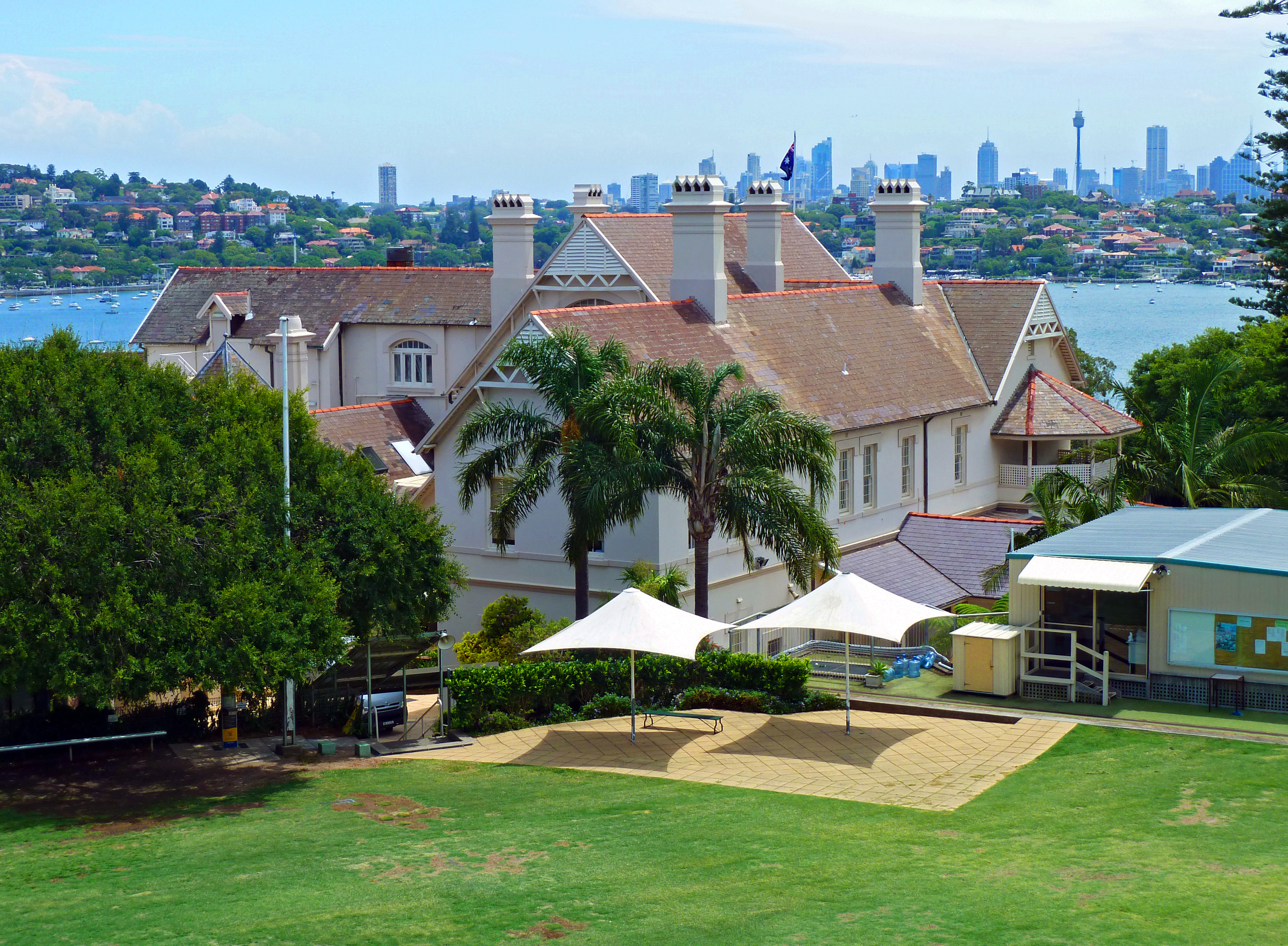
- Kambala pictured in 2011

Location
- 794 New South Head Road, Rose Bay, New South Wales; Australia; 33°51′54″S 151°16′19″E

Information
- Type: private school single-sex early learning, primary, and secondary day and boarding school
- Motto: Latin: Esto Sol Testis (Let the Sun be your Witness)
- Denomination: Anglican
- Established: 1887; 139 years ago
- Founder: Louisa Gurney
- Chairman: Ainslie van Onselen
- Principal: Jane Danvers
- Gender: Girls
- Slogan: A Global Sisterhood
- Affiliations: Alliance of Girls' Schools Australasia; Junior School Heads Association of Australia; Association of Heads of Independent Schools of Australia; Australian Boarding Schools' Association; Association of Heads of Independent Girls' Schools
- Website: www.kambala.nsw.edu.au

Kambala is a private early learning, primary, and secondary day and boarding school for girls, located in Rose Bay, New South Wales, Australia. Established in 1887, Kambala has a non-selective enrolment policy and currently caters for approximately 1,000 students from early learning to Year 12, including approximately 50 boarders from Year 7 to Year 12. Students come to Kambala from the greater metropolitan area, rural New South Wales and overseas.

The school is affiliated with the Alliance of Girls' Schools Australasia (AGSA), the Junior School Heads Association of Australia (JSHAA), the Association of Heads of Independent Schools of Australia (AHISA), the Australian Boarding Schools' Association (ABSA), the Global Citizen Diploma and is a founding member of the Association of Heads of Independent Girls' Schools (AHIGS).

== History ==
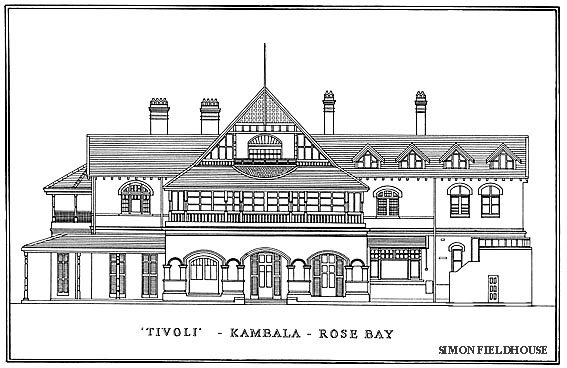
"Tivoli" - Kambala, Rose Bay

Kambala was established in 1887 by Louisa Gurney, the daughter of an English clergyman. Gurney conducted her first classes with twelve girls at a terrace house in Woollahra called 'Fernbank'. In 1891, Augustine Soubeiran, who had assisted in the running of the school and who taught French, became Co-Principal. To accommodate increasing enrolments, the School was moved to a larger property in Bellevue Hill called Kambala, from which the school took its new name.

In 1913, with an enrolment of nearly fifty, the School moved again, to its present site on New South Head Road, Rose Bay. The property was known as "Tivoli", from the original Tivoli Estate, and was previously occupied by Captain William Dumaresq and later by merchant James Robinson Love. The spacious new building was built in 1841, and the notable architect John Horbury Hunt was commissioned to extend it. Today this building houses classrooms and Kambala's boarders in Years 7 to 9.

In 1926, Kambala became a Foundation School controlled by an independent council. During Fifi Hawthorne's tenure as Principal, 1933 to 1966, the school grew from 100 students to more than 660, and buildings and facilities expanded accordingly.

== Principals ==
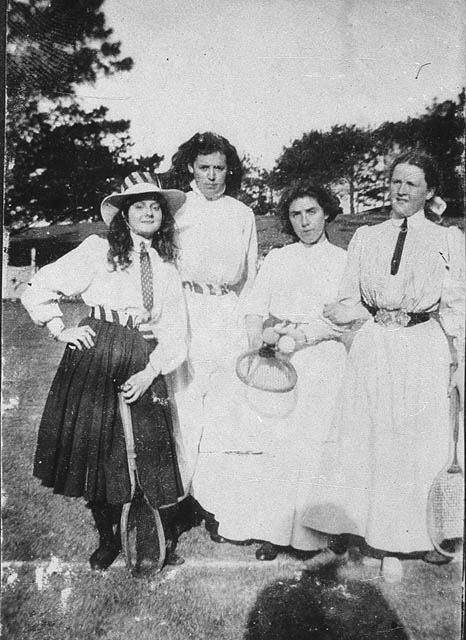
Kambala students, c. 1890s

Period	Details
1891–1914	Augustine Soubeiran
1887–1914	Louise Gurney
1914–1927	Clara Roseby
1914–1926	Minnie Roseby
1927–1932	Flora Stewart
1933–1966	Fifi Hawthorne
1966–1984	Joyce Gibbons
1985–1987	Barbara Monk
1988–1999	Peter Moxham
1999	Roderick West
2000–2013	Margaret White
2014–2017	Debra Kelliher
2017–2021	Shane Hogan
2021	Amanda Bell
2022–present	Jane Danvers

== Campus ==
Kambala is located on a single campus on the rising shore above suburban Rose Bay, overlooking Sydney Harbour. The school is divided into four main areas:

1. Hampshire House – the Early Learning Centre (0–5 years)
2. Massie House for students from Preparation (4 year olds) to Year 2;
3. Junior School for girls in Years 3 to 6; and
4. Senior School for girls in Years 7 to 12.

=== Boarding ===
Boarding students reside in Fernbank Boarding House next to the school grounds, overlooking Sydney Harbour.

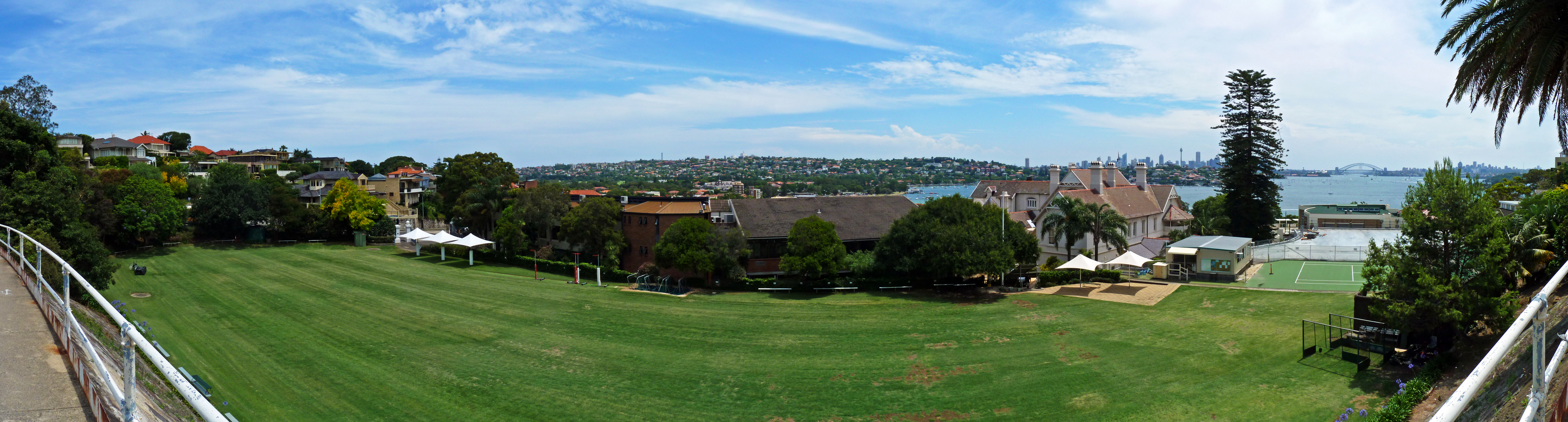
Kambala overlooking Sydney Harbour, as seen from New South Head Road.

== House system ==
The House system was introduced at Kambala in 1928. Each student from Years 3 to 12 is allocated to one of the four houses: Gurney, Hawthorne, Roseby and Wentworth. There are several inter-house competitions throughout the year, in which houses can earn points towards the annual Angus Cup. Each House is led by two house captains. Tutor groups are formed according to houses.

== Notable alumnae ==
Kambala Old Girls' Union Logo

Ex-students of Kambala are known as Old Girls and may elect to join the Kambala Old Girls' Union (KOGU). Notable Kambala Old Girls include:

- Jessie Strahorn Aspinall – first female junior resident medical officer at Royal Prince Alfred Hospital (1906) (also attended Presbyterian Ladies' College, Sydney)
- Claudia Black – actress, best known for her portrayal of Aeryn Sun and Vala Mal Doran in science fiction television series Farscape and Stargate SG-1
- Sheila Chisholm – socialite
- Michelle Guthrie – former managing director of the Australian Broadcasting Corporation
- Judy Playfair – silver medal-winning swimmer at the 1968 Mexico City Olympics
- Claire Messud – writer
- Chanel Contos – founder of Teach Us Consent
- Nicole O'Neil – Emirati-born Swedish socialite

== See also ==
- List of non-government schools in New South Wales
- List of boarding schools in Australia
