= Chanel Contos =

Australian sexual consent advocate

- Born: Australia
- Education: Kambala School; University of New South Wales; University College London
- Occupations: Sexual consent advocate, author
- Known for: Founding Teach Us Consent
- Notable work: Consent Laid Bare (2023)
- Movement: Sexual consent education, Women's rights
- Awards: Young People's Human Rights Medal (2021); BBC 100 Women (2022)
- Website: teachusconsent.com

Chanel Contos is an Australian sexual consent advocate. Contos became known globally in 2021, following an outpouring of responses to her request for young Australian women to report on their sexual assault experiences. She is the founder of the non-profit research and advocacy organisation Teach Us Consent and chair of the Global Institute for Women's Leadership's Youth Committee. Her book Consent Laid Bare was published in Australia in 2023, and in the UK and US in 2025.

== Early life and education ==
Chanel Contos is of Greek Australian descent. She grew up first in Glenorie, a northern rural suburb of Sydney, later moving to Vaucluse, in the eastern suburbs.

She attended Kambala School in Rose Bay, Sydney, before studying at the University of New South Wales for two bachelor's degrees, in commerce and arts. She also taught at UNSW.

She holds a first-class master's degree in Gender, Education and International Development from University College London, based on research into "how elite schooling in Australia upholds power structures that enable sexual assault". She also earned a master's in public policy from at the Blavatnik School of Government at the University of Oxford, after being awarded a Governor Phillip Scholarship.

== Advocacy and career ==
=== Teach Us Consent ===
In February 2021, Contos began an Instagram poll asking for stories from young Australian women who had been sexually assaulted. After an outpouring of responses, she started the website Teach Us Consent, which hosted a separate online petition to ask for sexual consent education in Australian schools. The petition generated a strong response, with over 44,000 signatures within a month of its launch, along with over 5,000 stories of sexual assault.

In March 2021, the sex crimes unit of the New South Wales Police Force collaborated with Contos to ask young women who had filed stories of assault on Contos' site to also make informal reports to the New South Wales Police Force. In April 2021, Contos proposed that an anonymous online tip site be set up to enable young victims of sexual assault to report assaults to Australian police.

In May 2021, the then Australian prime minister Scott Morrison pledged to meet with Contos to discuss sexual consent education. This eventually led to the adoption of compulsory consent education in the Australian National Curriculum.

Contos brought more widespread awareness to the practice of stealthing, and, supported by research of and advocacy by The Australia Institute, helped to initiate consistent criminalisation of this form of sexual assault (non-consensual removal of a condom during sex) in all states and territories of Australia. As of 2023, all states except Western Australia had criminalised stealthing. In July 2022 she convened a forum on the issue hosted by The Australia Institute, with attendees including federal Attorney-General Mark Dreyfus, Attorneys-General advisors, shadow Attorneys-General, Supreme Court judges, and legislative council members. It was widely covered by the media.

Teach Us Consent is now a not-for-profit education and advocacy organisation supported by the Australian Government and various philanthropists. As of 2026 it is running a campaign called "Fix Our Feeds", to combat the influence of social media algorithms on gender-based violence and young people's health. The campaign has wide support from many organisations and individuals involved in the prevention of violence, men's mental health, eating disorders, democracy, and social cohesion.

=== Other roles and activities ===
In 2023, Contos was appointed founding chair of the Global Institute for Women's Leadership's Youth Advisory Committee at the Australian National University, and as of August 2026 remains in this role.

On 1 November 2023, a couple of months after the publication of her book Consent Laid Bare, Contos addressed the National Press Club.

On International Women's Day in 2024, she was on the panel for an UNSW event titled "Consent Laid Bare", along with three other women, to discuss safety for women on university campuses and other places.

On 2 September 2026, Contos again addressed the National Press Club, this time in collaboration with Women in Media, to talk about her the harms of social media algorithms, in a talk entitled "Algorithmic funnels and division: the systematic promotion of outrage, misogyny, and radicalisation online". In her talk, she advocated for an "opt-in" rather than an "opt-out" model on social media, which would require the platforms to revert to their original models, in which people can choose to just see posts from friends and accounts they follow. According to research done by Teach Us Consent, boys aged 16–18 were likely to be fed misogynistic content within 25 minutes after creating an account on social media platforms.

In October 2026, Contos headlined an event held at the South Australian Museum in Adelaide, South Australia, hosted by Katrine Hildyard, Minister for Women in the Malinauskas ministry. The event, titled "More than words", was a forum for young South Australian women to discuss how to deal with the increasing online threats to women. It focused on the "manosphere" and online gender-based violence, and how it may contribute to intimidation and real-world violence.

== Publications ==
Contos' book, Consent Laid Bare: sex, entitlement and the distortion of desire, was published by Macmillan Australia in September 2023, and in the US and UK in 2025.

== Recognition and awards ==
In the 2021 Australian Human Rights Awards, Contos won the Young People's Human Rights Medal. She was also named one of Marie Claire's 2021 Women of the Year; Vogue Australia named her as one of the "21 people who shaped 2021"; and Good Weekend magazine listed her in their list of "the influential of the influential" for 2021.

In July 2022 she received a Diana Award, presented by Princes William and Harry in honour of their mother, Diana, Princess of Wales. She was specifically awarded for her work in "exposing pervasive misogynistic attitudes and behaviours within Australian schools through more than 6,700 testimonies from women and girls who have been sexually assaulted by men and boys". In December 2022, she was honoured as one of BBC's 100 Women.

In 2023 she was named NSW Young Woman of the Year in the NSW Women of the Year Awards. She was also a nominee for NSW Young Australian of the Year in the Australian of the Year awards.
