= Milton Love =

Australian Magistrate in New South Wales

- Born: 18 September 1852; Surry Hills, New South Wales
- Died: 14 November 1924 (aged 72); Neutral Bay, New South Wales
- Education: Newington College
- Occupation: Stipendiary Magistrate
- Title: His Honour Milton Love SM
- Spouse(s): Alice (née Spooner); Matilda (née Wallace)
- Children: 3 sons and 2 daughters
- Parent(s): William Love and Ellinor (née Robinson)

Milton Sydney Love (18 September 1852 – 14 November 1924), invariably referred to as M. S. Love, was an Australian Stipendiary Magistrate in New South Wales and the founding Warden of the Southern Mining District of NSW.

== Birth and education ==
Caricature by David Low

Love was the son of the politician William Love and Ellinor Robinson, both immigrants from Ireland, and brother of merchant James. On 16 July 1863, Love was one of the first 16 boys enrolled on the foundation of Newington College at Newington House on the Parramatta River at Silverwater, New South Wales. At twelve years of age he was student number eleven on the handwritten roll. According to the second Headmaster of the school, Thomas Johnstone, Love was "one of the best conducted, most perseveringly diligent, and most thoroughly amiable pupils that I have ever taught.’" He left Newington in September 1866 "in consequence of business depression". His father and brother had joined in a retail grocery shop at 476 George Street, Sydney, but in October 1866 Love & Son became insolvent.

== Public service career ==
Love joined the Public Service in 1868 as an officer of the Works Department and in 1877 moved to the Justice Department. He was appointed to be the Police Magistrate, Clerk of Petty Sessions and Registrar of the District Court at Cooma by the Governor of New South Wales on 1 June 1887, when he also assumed the duties of Warden at Cooma. Love was also appointed to be a Warden of the Southern Mining District by the Governor of New South Wales on 18 June 1887. He was later appointed to the position of Stipendary Magistrate, a position which he held for 18 1/2 years. He retired in 1919 and died at his home in Thrupp Street, Neutral Bay.

== Public acclaim ==
Love received acclaim after imposing the smallest of fines. In 1898 a man came before the Redfern Police Court after his son had only attended school for 62 days in half a year, out of 112 school days. The boy's attendance was 8 short of the minimum 70 days and Love fined the father one penny, without costs, and if the father did not pay he was to be imprisoned for one minute with hard labour. Different details were published at the time of his death in 1924, where the offender was reported to be a young girl, at the Newtown court, for a breach of railway regulations and the sentence including twelve months in which to pay. The same penalty was in 1913 imposed by Love on a man who had been unable to pay his tramfare in time before arriving at his destination.

His popularity was attested by the public reception given him on the occasion of his transfer from Newcastle to Parramatta.

The cartoonist David Low drew a caricature of him as a kind of Cupid for The Bulletin, reproduced in the album Caricatures by Low 1915.

== Marriages and children ==
On 3 December 1878, Love married Alice Emelie Rosa Spooner in St Andrew's Church, Walcha. They had three children between 1880 and 1887 and two died in infancy. Alice died in 1897 and Love married Matilda Jane Wallace in 1899 at Marrickville. They had two sons. At the time of his death, Love left a widow, two sons, Mr William Arnold Love of Goulburn and Mr Jack Milton Wallace Love of Sydney, and a daughter, Mrs Emily Ellen Magson, of North Sydney. His second wife died in 1943.
