= Nicolaus Copernicus Monument (Montreal) =

Structure in Montreal

- Monument à Nicolas Copernic (French)
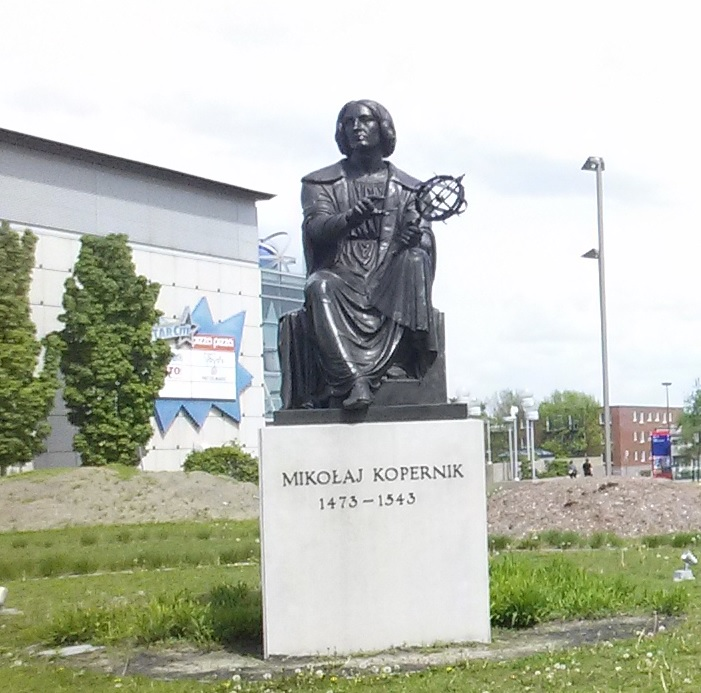
- The monument in 2017
- Location: Montreal, Quebec, Canada; 45°33′38″N 73°32′58″W

The Nicolaus Copernicus Monument (French: Monument à Nicolas Copernic), a 1966 replica of Bertel Thorvaldsen's 1830 monument in Warsaw, is located outside the Rio Tinto Alcan Planetarium in Montreal's Space for Life. It was previously displayed in Chaboillez Square, outside the Dow Planetarium. The statue was originally displayed during Expo 67, and was relocated to its current location in 2013.

- Artist: Bertel Thorvaldsen (1770–1844), Danish sculptor
- Materials
  - Statue: bronze
  - Base: concrete
- Dimensions:
  - Statue: 2.7 m × 1.1 m
  - Base: 1.8 m × 1.5 m
- Manufacturing: Bronze: Lauritz Rasmussen, Denmark, posthumous draw from plaster molds and original made in 1966 under the supervision of Dr. Dyveke Helsted, Thorvaldsen Museum director
- Inaugurated in 1967, Montreal World's Fair
- Acquired by the City of Montreal: 1968.
