= William Dow =

Canadian businessman

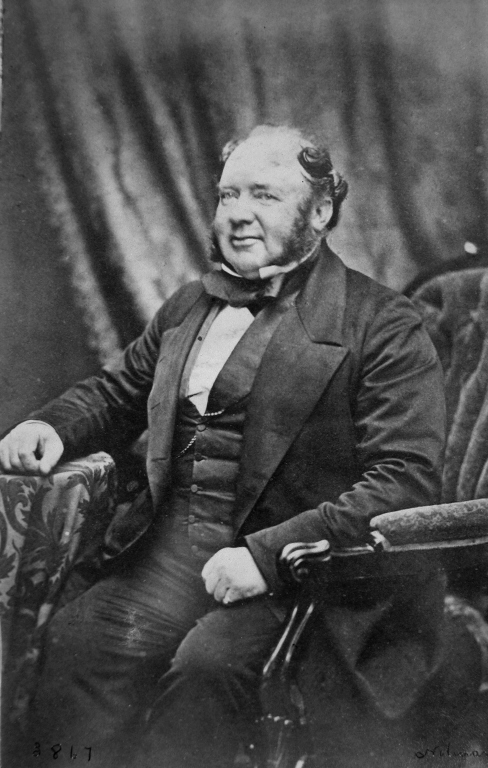
- William Dow circa 1862
- Born: March 27, 1800; Muthill, Perthshire, Scotland
- Died: December 7, 1868 (aged 68); Montreal, Canada

William Dow (March 27, 1800 – December 7, 1868) was a British-born brewer and financier of Montreal, Quebec, Canada.

Born at Muthill, Perthshire, he was the eldest son of Dr William Dow (1765–1844), Brewmaster, and Anne Mason. Since 1652, his family had been brewing in Perthshire. Having gained an extensive experience in brewing under his father, he emigrated from the UK to Montreal, Lower Canada in about 1818. He was employed as foreman of Thomas Dunn's brewery in Montreal and quickly became a partner. His younger brother, Andrew, who had also trained as a brewer, joined him, and on the death of Dunn, the company became known as William Dow and Company, later known as Dow Breweries. It soon was a strong competitor to Molson's, the biggest brewery in the city. Dow was also a financier and in 1860 he built his home, Strathearn House, in Montreal's Golden Square Mile.
