= Dow Breweries =

Canadian brewery

Dow Breweries was a brewery based in the province of Quebec, Canada. The company was founded by William Dow (1800–1868). The Dow Brewery eventually came under the control of National Breweries of Quebec in the 1920s, which itself was bought out in 1952 by Canadian Breweries. After Canadian Breweries became Carling O'Keefe and merged with Molson Breweries, its brands were discontinued in 1997.

== History ==
Dow had started as an apprentice at the Montreal brewery of Thomas Dunn, established in La Prairie in 1790. Dow eventually became a partner in Dunn's brewery and took over the company upon Dunn's death, establishing William Dow & Co., later known as Dow Breweries.

Dow Breweries was purchased in the 1920s by National Breweries of Quebec, which itself was acquired by Canadian Breweries (CBL) in 1952. Under CBL ownership, it took over the Quebec City brewery of the Boswell Brewery (1843–1952). CBL was one of the "Big Three" of Canadian brewing and Dow became a national brand. The Quebec City brewery stopped its activities on March 31, 1966, and production of the Dow brands moved to other plants.

At the urging of board chair and academic Pierre Gendron, Dow Breweries supported the construction of the Dow Planetarium. It was completed in 1966 as one of many projects for the Canadian Centennial.

== Dow Beer deaths ==
In August 1965, a patient presented to a hospital in Quebec City with symptoms suggestive of alcoholic cardiomyopathy. Over the next eight months, 50 more cases with similar findings appeared in the same area with 20 of these being fatal. It was noted that all patients were heavy drinkers who mostly drank beer and preferred the Dow brand, 30 out of those consuming more than 200 imperial fluid ounces (10 imp pt; 5.7 L) of beer per day. Epidemiological studies found that Dow had been adding cobalt sulfate to the beer for foam stability since July 1965 and that the concentration added in the Quebec city brewery was 10 times that of the same beer brewed in Montreal where there were no reported cases.

Although Dow denied any responsibility, the Dow Brewery in Quebec City temporarily shut down and the remaining beer was dumped into the Saint Lawrence River. At the time of the incident, Dow Ale was the number one selling beer in Quebec; however, as a result of the "tainted beer scandal" sales of the brand soon dropped dramatically never to recover.

Canadian Breweries became Carling O'Keefe in 1973, which eventually merged with the Molson Brewery in 1989. The Dow brands were discontinued in the spring of 1997. Brands brewed by Dow included Dow Ale, Kingsbeer Lager and Black Horse Ale. The Molson Black Horse Ale sold today in Newfoundland is a different product.

== See also ==
- William Dow
- List of microbreweries
