= Anduze =

Commune in Occitanie, France

- Commune
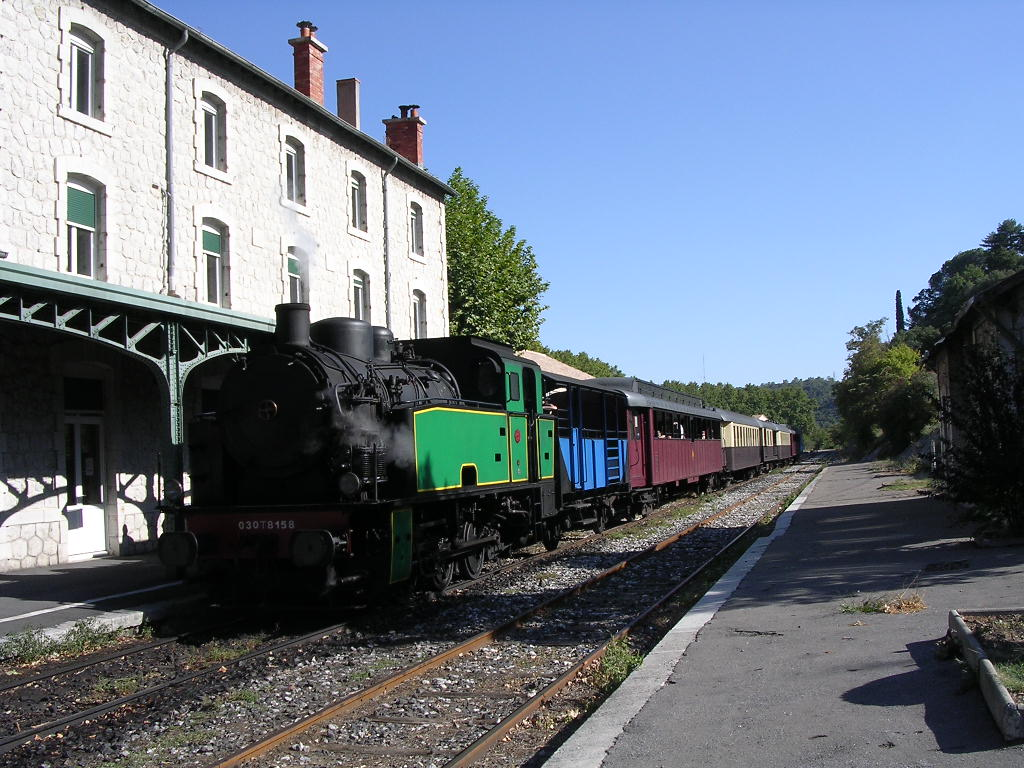
- Heritage railway

- Coat of arms
- Location of Anduze
- Location within France Location within Occitanie
- Coordinates: 44°3′12.51″N 3°59′11.66″E
- Country: France
- Region: Occitania
- Department: Gard
- Arrondissement: Alès
- Canton: Alès-1
- Intercommunality: Alès Agglomération

Government
  - Mayor (2020–2026): Geneviève Blanc
- Area^{1}: 14.6 km^{2} (5.6 sq mi)
- Elevation: 131 m (430 ft)
- Highest elevation: 443 m (1,453 ft)
- Lowest elevation: 117 m (384 ft)
- Population (2023): 3,391
  - Density: 232/km^{2} (602/sq mi)
- Time zone: UTC+01:00 (CET)
  - Summer (DST): UTC+02:00 (CEST)
- INSEE/Postal code: 30010 /30140
- ^{1} French Land Register data, which excludes lakes, ponds, glaciers > 1 km^{2} (0.386 sq mi or 247 acres) and river estuaries.

Anduze (French pronunciation: [ɑ̃dyz]; Occitan: Andusa) is a commune in the Gard department in southern France. The village is at the foot of the Cevennes range, in the limestone plateau of the Languedoc scrublands.

== History ==
The lordship of Anduze which was established in the early 10th century was one of the oldest and most powerful of Languedoc. Coining money, the family Anduze reigned as the supreme house of the Cevennes. The lords of the House Anduze were the titled Marquis of Gothia and Prince of Anduze and were allied to the counts of Toulouse and participated in the crusade against the Albigensians in 1266, it was related to the crown of France. It counted among its branches of the houses of Sauve, Roquefeuil (still existing), Sommieres, and Cayla Thoiras. Anduze was the cradle of French sericulture from late 13th century. The city then became the regional center of trading in silk and wool. It had up to 7,000 people at its peak.

In the 16th and 17th centuries, Anduze was an important centre of Protestantism. The walled city, which had 6000 inhabitants in 1570, became the headquarters of the Protestant forces of the South. In 1573, the city had the birth of what Janine Garrison called the United Provinces of the South, including an attempted independent Huguenot state, based on local autonomy. Anduze was the basis of the resistance of the Duc de Rohan in 1622, and in 1629, the Peace of Alès, saw the dismantling of the city ramparts.

In the 19th century, with the Industrial Revolution, new economic development in silk mills, hosiery, and headgear took place, before being hit by recession. Anduze was also site of the Cevennes Coal Mines, prime contractors of the French coal industry.

The city is known for its zinc smelting, pottery, and castle dating from the 16th century. Currently, tourism plays an important role in the economy of the area; the station is used by the tourist railway steam train of the Cevennes.

== Population ==
Historical population

Year	Pop.	±% p.a.
1266	7,000	—
1570	6,000	−0.05%
1793	5,051	−0.08%
1800	5,019	−0.09%
1806	5,431	+1.32%
1821	5,326	−0.13%
1831	5,554	+0.42%
1836	5,403	−0.55%
1841	5,238	−0.62%
1846	5,306	+0.26%
1851	5,399	+0.35%
1856	5,451	+0.19%
1861	5,203	−0.93%
1866	5,303	+0.38%
1872	5,199	−0.33%
1876	5,110	−0.43%
1881	4,662	−1.82%
1886	4,069	−2.68%
1891	3,906	−0.81%
1896	3,657	−1.31%

Year	Pop.	±% p.a.
1901	3,686	+0.16%
1906	4,404	+3.62%
1911	3,324	−5.47%
1921	2,589	−2.47%
1926	2,621	+0.25%
1931	2,507	−0.89%
1936	2,479	−0.22%
1946	2,190	−1.23%
1954	2,750	+2.89%
1962	3,066	+1.37%
1968	3,027	−0.21%
1975	2,723	−1.50%
1982	2,787	+0.33%
1990	2,913	+0.55%
1999	3,004	+0.34%
2007	3,275	+1.09%
2012	3,323	+0.29%
2017	3,436	+0.67%
2023	3,391	−0.22%

Source: EHESS (1793-1962) and INSEE (1968-2023)

== Sights ==
- Bambouseraie de Prafrance
- The Clock Tower dates from 1320, it has three levels and is reminiscent of the architecture of the tower of Constance Aigues-Mortes. It Became the town clock in 1569, it was spared during the destruction of the ramparts in 1629. The bell at the top of the turret in its campanile, dates from 1701. The total building height is 22 meters.
- The New Castle is a mansion of the sixteenth and seventeenth centuries. On the occasion of its construction, it was built into the walls. It consists of two towers in front.
- Tower Pézène: it is part of Castle Pézène old stately home and residence of the counts of Beaufort fifteenth and sixteenth centuries. The tower dates from the thirteenth and fourteenth centuries.
- The Meridian: installed in the clock of the city in 1569, in 1629 it was spared during the destruction of the ramparts, the Meridian was restored in 1989.
- The Grain market hall built in 1457, called The Orgerie or grain market. It was the place of the market for chestnuts and today at the local produce market (Thursdays).
- The barracks: they were built in 1740 on the Brie plan to house the royal troops, now houses the tourist office, the right part became mayor office.
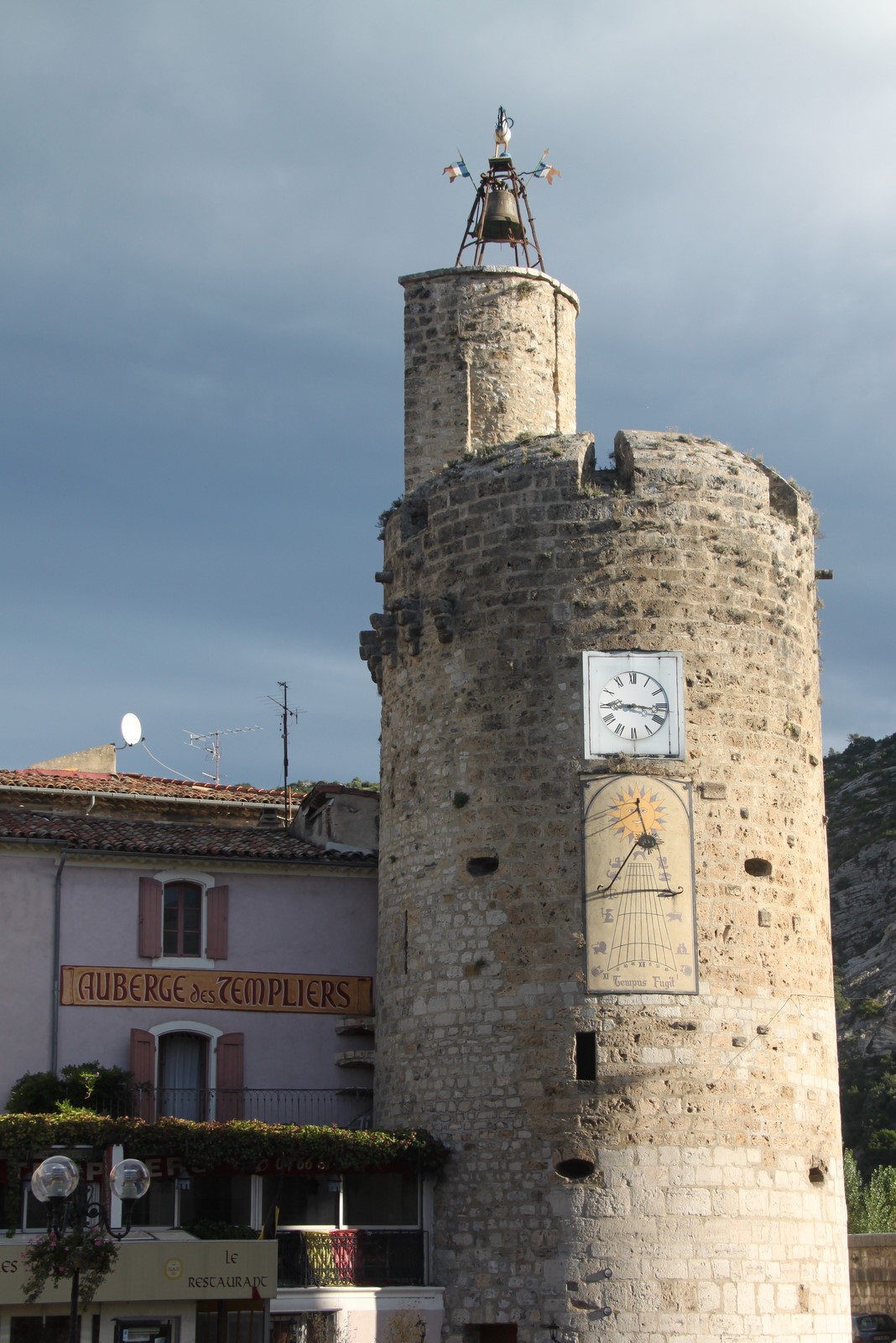
Tour de l'horloge (Clock tower).

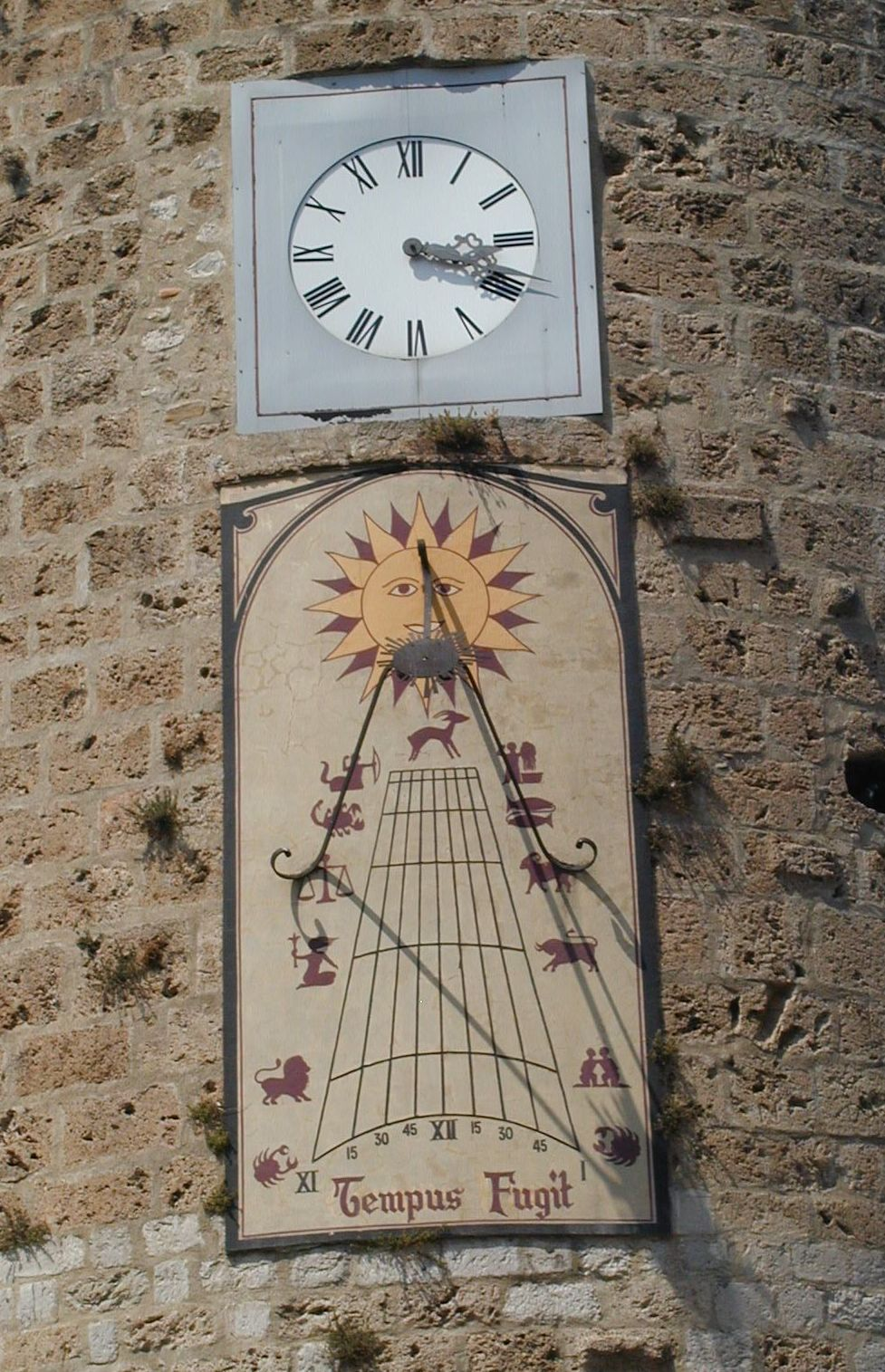
Le cadran solaire.

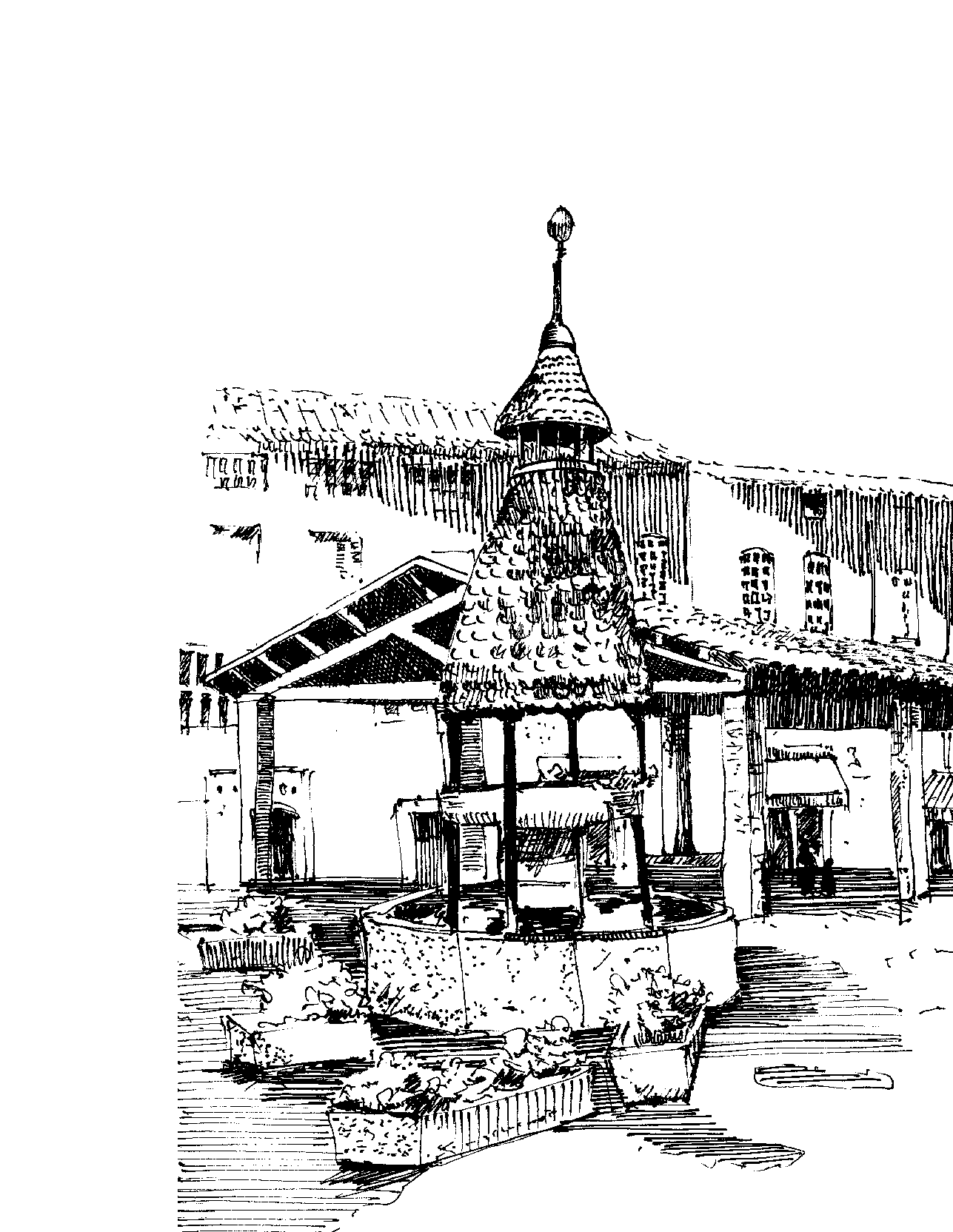
Grain Hall market.

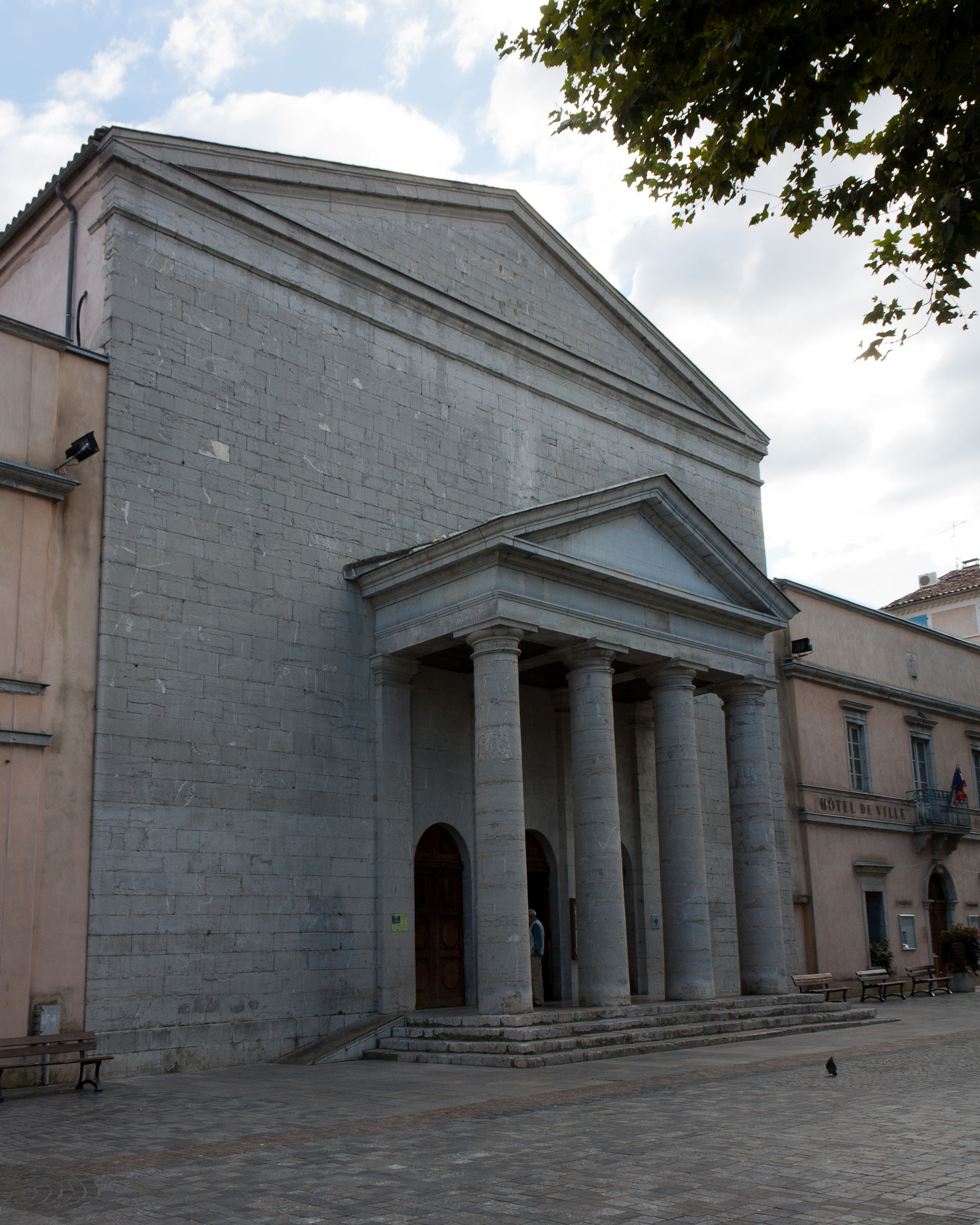
Main Protestant church

=== Fountains ===
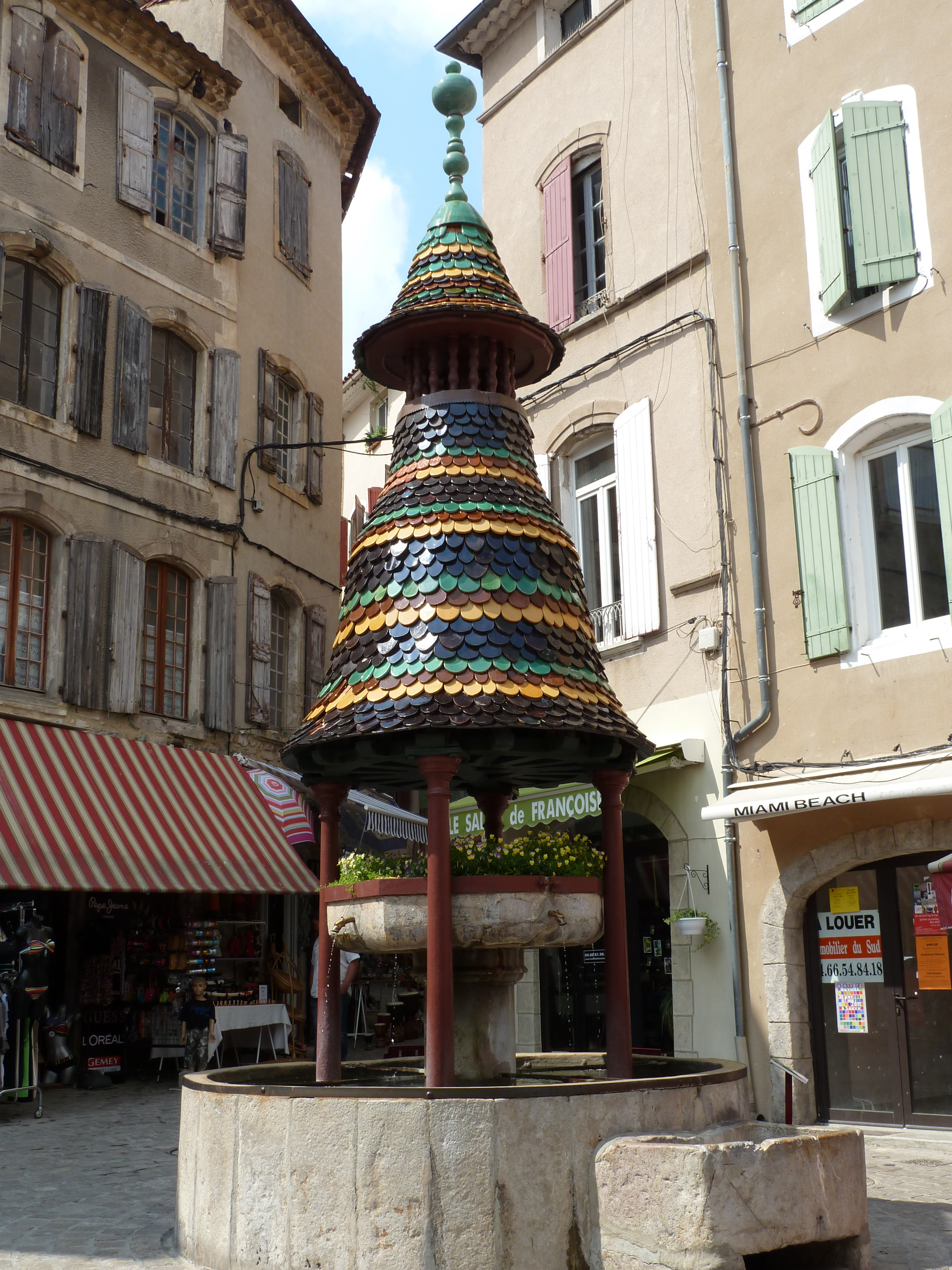
Fontaine Pagode.

The town has many picturesque fountains, the most famous is the so-called Pagoda, near the ancient medieval halls.

- The Fountain of Pradier column associated with the name of his sculptor James Pradier who realized in the 1830s neoclassical style it is topped by a particularly ornate marquee that is not without reminding us of a book of antiquity. ..
- The fountain of the Bicentennial ': conducted in 1989 near the Church by a companion for the commemoration of the bicentenary of the French Revolution. The three columns each illustrate a style: the Doric, the Ionic, Corinthian.
- Pagoda fountain oriental style, it was built in 1648 as indicated in its glazed colored tiles, probably from the drawings (and the money) of an Anduzien who went to look for silkworm eggs from the east.
- The fountain of Potters: located between the street and the Gaussorgues Fusterie street, it covers the base of the ridge of a house on the corner. It owes its name to the fact that many pottery workshops occupied this area there are still a few decades.
- The church Fontaine: dated 1715, it is located on the site of an old cemetery once instead Cemetery. The pyramid or obelisk that overcomes the fountain has a surprising optical effect from a certain angle, this because of the three stone balls that form the base.
- The fountain of Notre Dame in 1715. It owes its name to an ancient chapel now gone.
- The Pradier fountain in classical style, it dates from the early nineteenth century. It consists of a large circular pool at its center, on an ornate pedestal, took a basin, supporting itself a composite style column

=== Churches ===
The town of Anduze has long been a centre for diverse Christian traditions, and this is reflected in the variety of church buildings today

- The Main Protestant church is one of the largest in France, built between 1820 and 1823 neoclassical style with its large portico with columns supporting a large triangular pediment. It was built on the site of the court Barracks. The nave is organized into a semicircle divided into three spans supported on columns that support vast grandstands that run along the 4 walls; this architecture is very similar to that of the church of Saint-Hippolyte-du-Fort, which is larger in area by only a small number of square meters. It has an important organ dating from 1848. Organists, such as Marie Louise Girod, had the privilege to play on this instrument since its complete restoration in 1964. There is a marble pulpit with a very graceful double staircase and the table communion also in marble which is said that the lion heads come from the former base of the statue of Louis XIV that adorned the Place du Peyrou in Montpellier defeated the Revolution ... the tower wall to a bay is not placed on the north main facade, but on the south gable. It houses a bell from 1883 Following the workshops Baudouin de Marseille and weighs 650 kg.
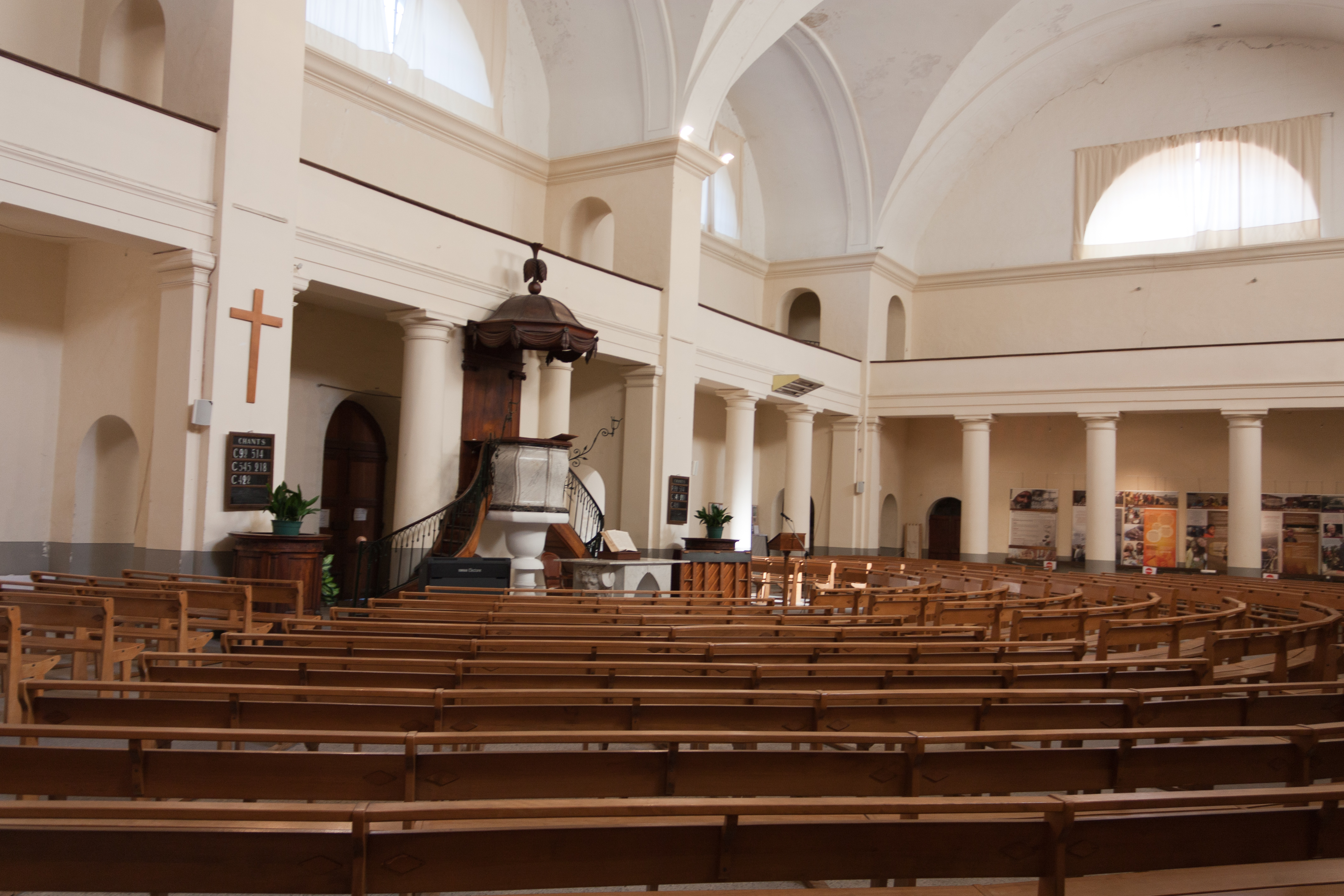
Salle de l'Assemblée.

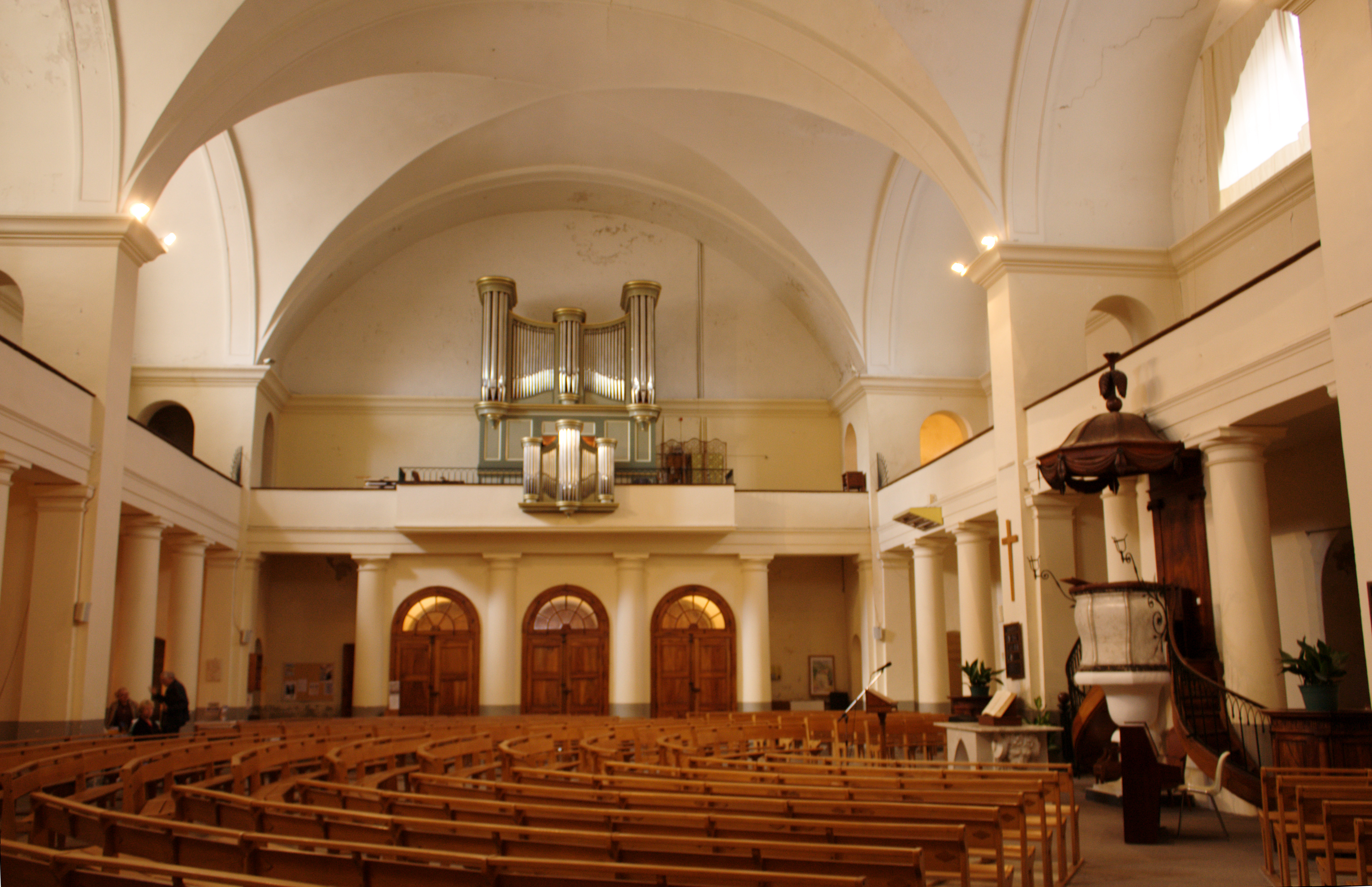
Salle de l'Assemblée.

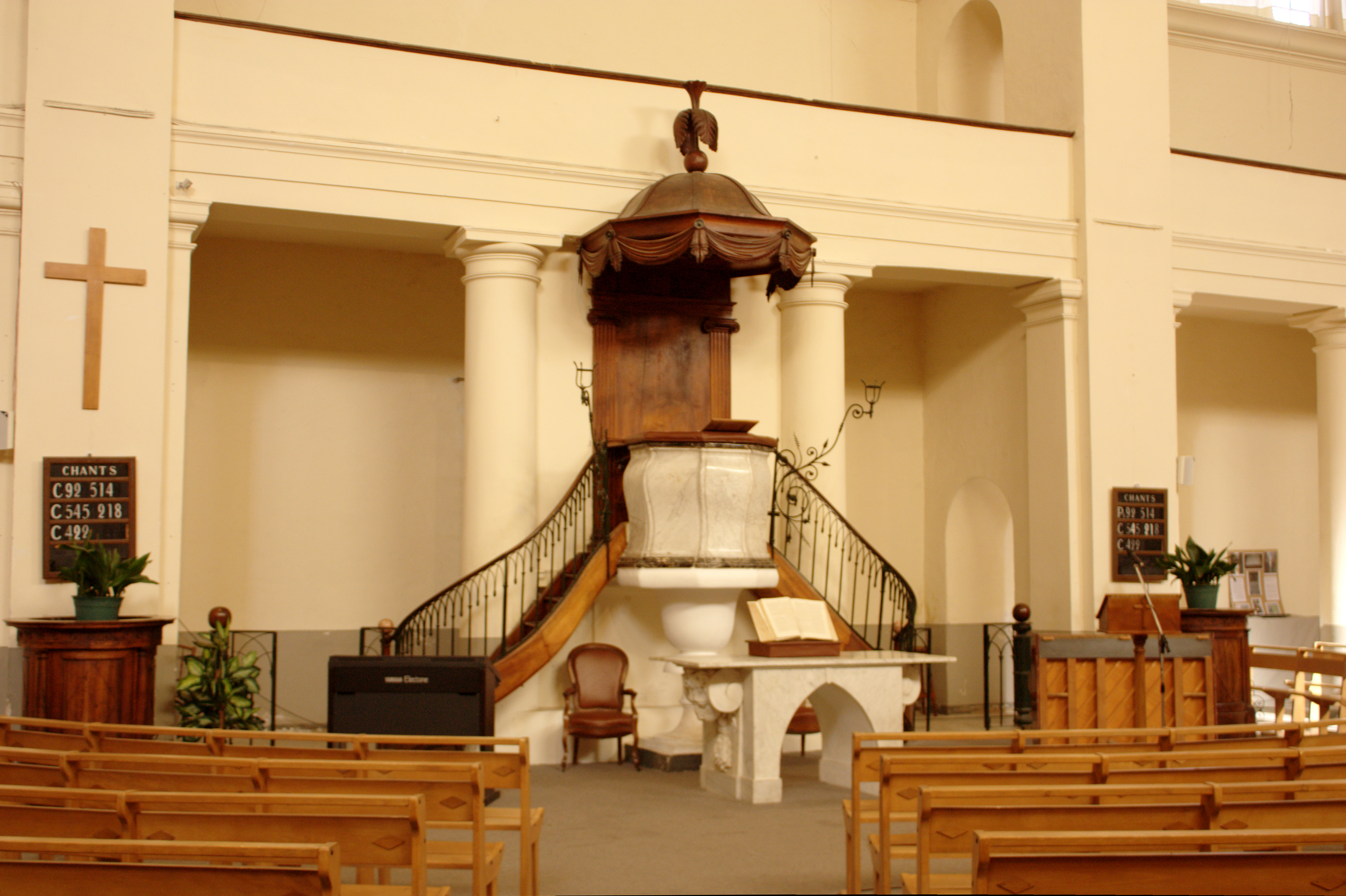
Chaire à prêcher.
- The Hall of Salle Assemblée. Chaire to prêcher.the first Protestant church: In 1567, its premises located at 5 rue Notarized in a street of the old Anduze. Later, in 1590, it was enlarged. Upon revocation of the Edict of Nantes in 1685, Protestants were expelled from 5 Notarized street to get into the mountains and especially the "desert" (now the museum of the same name tells this epic). In addition to being the first Protestant church, the house of the 5 Notarized street is known for being the consular house, one of the first schools, an important place in the history of Anduze.
- The church of Saint-Étienne was built between 1686 and 1688 on the site of the old church building demolished after the revocation of the Edict of Nantes in 1685. The bell tower with its stone dome 4 section Dates from 1588.
- The Methodist chapel, second half of the 19th century.

== Gallery ==
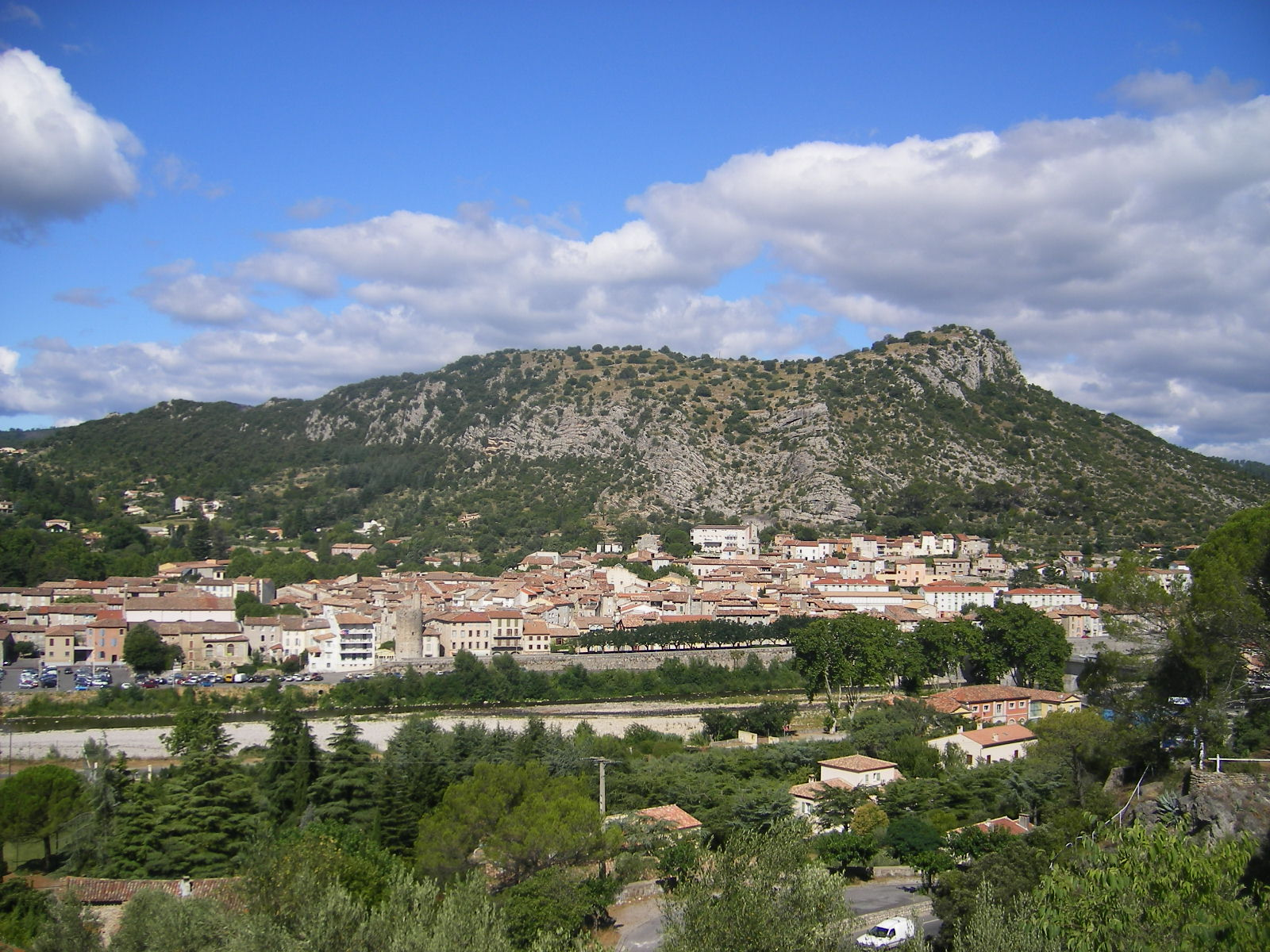
View of the village

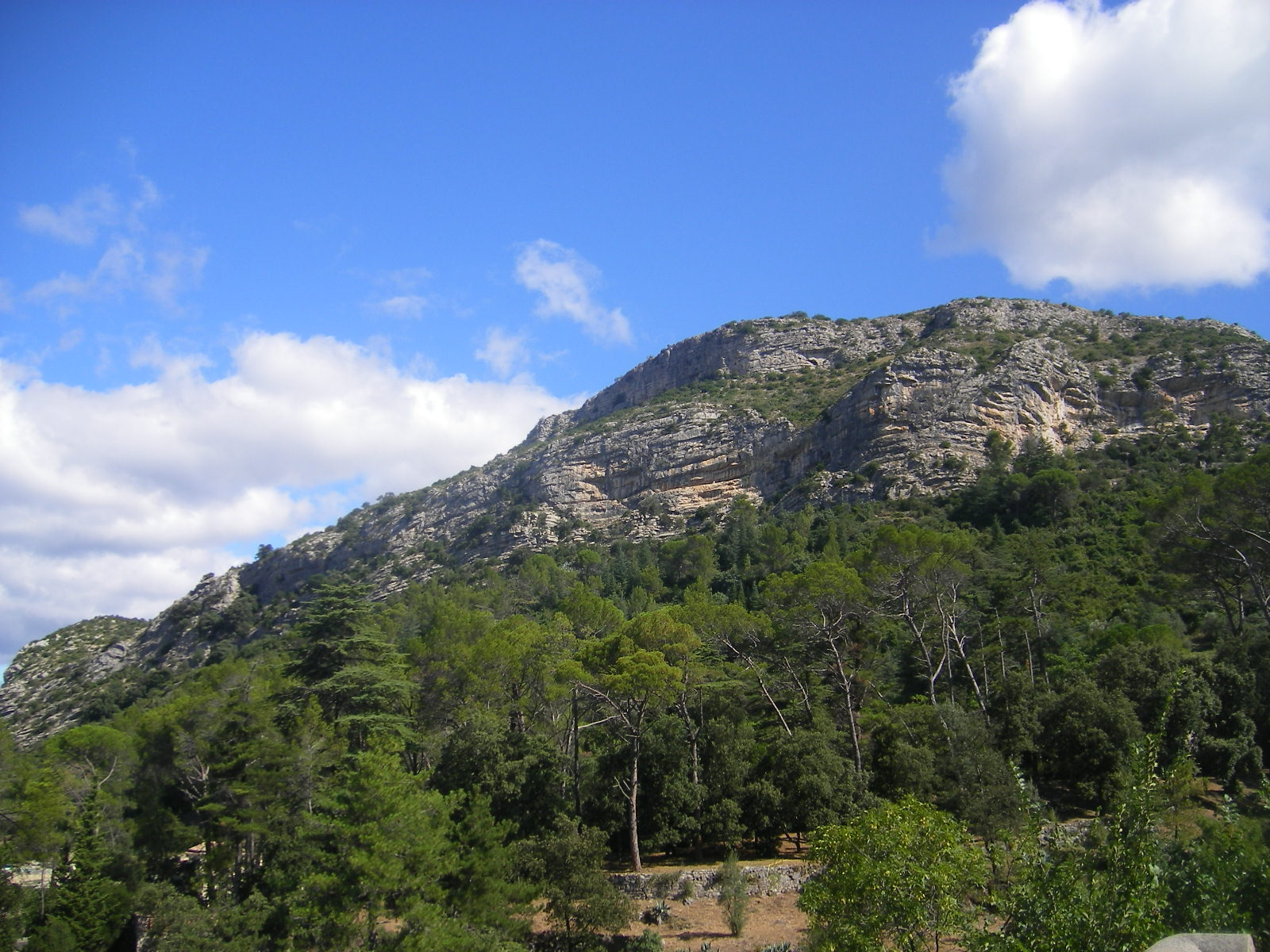
La montagne dominant Anduze.

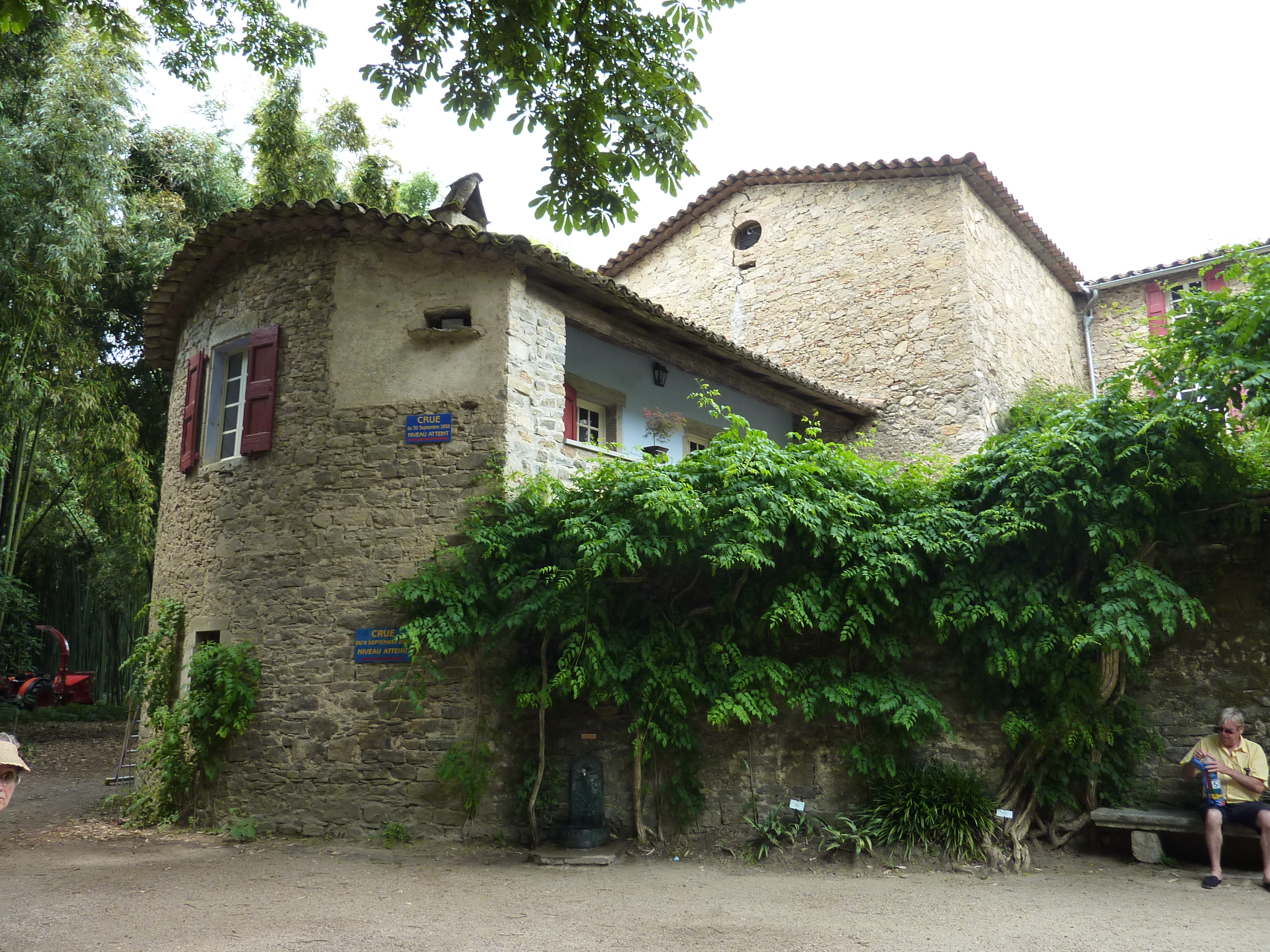
La hauteur des crues du Gardon d'Anduze (à la bambouseraie de Prafrance).

Coat of Arms

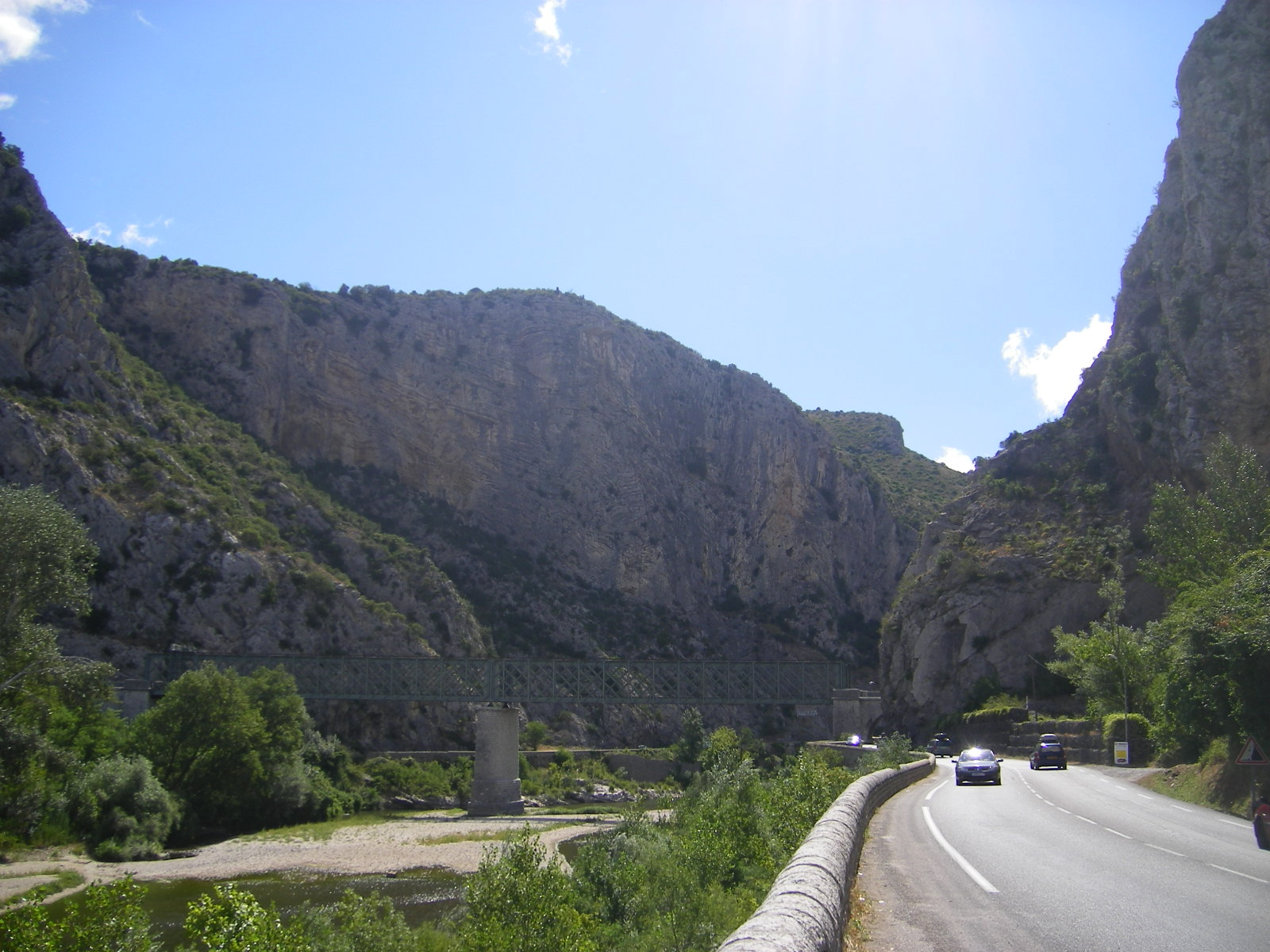
La route en direction de Saint-Jean-du-Gard et le pont ferroviaire sur le Gardon d'Anduze.

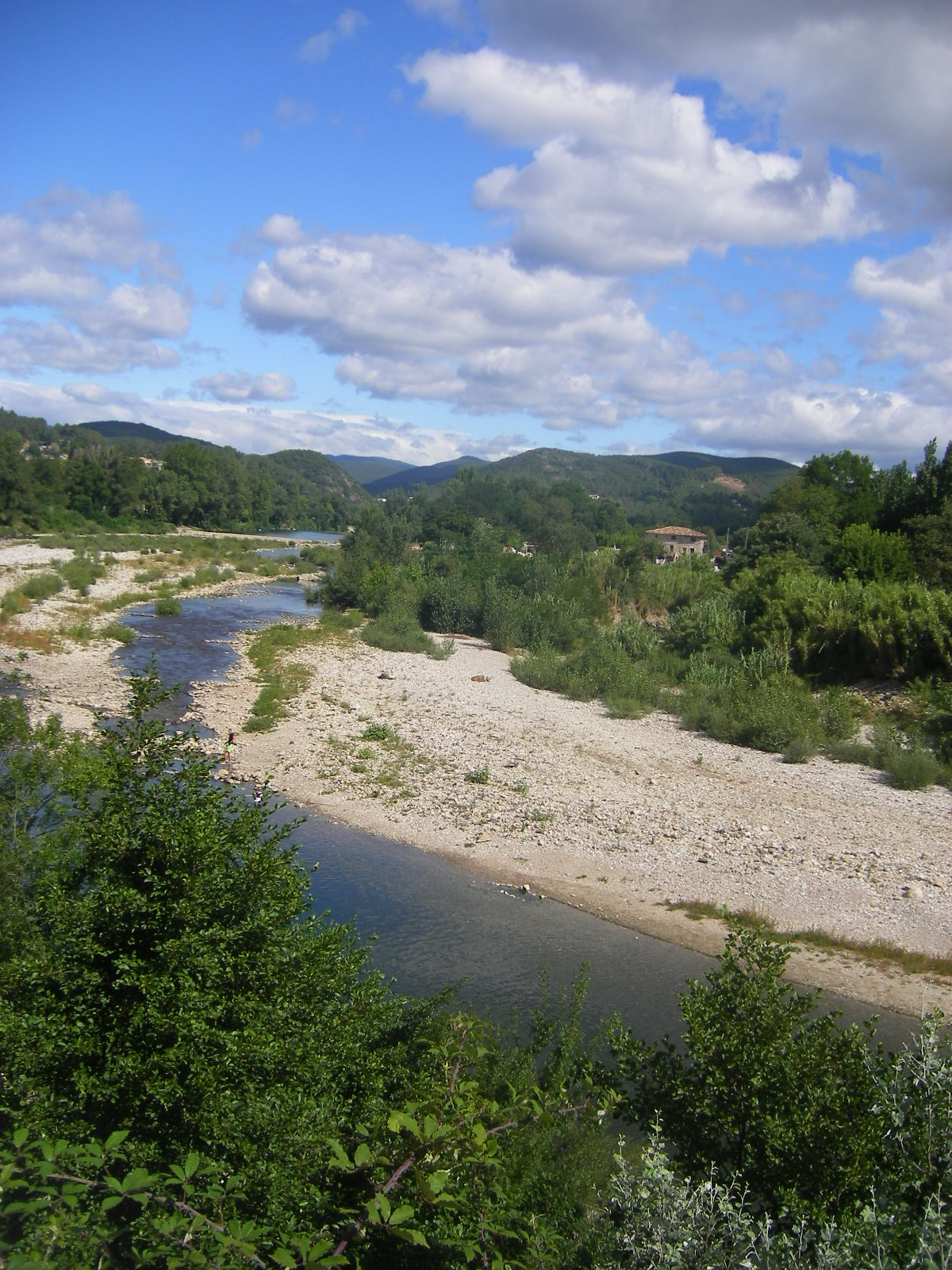
Le « Gardon d'Anduze ».

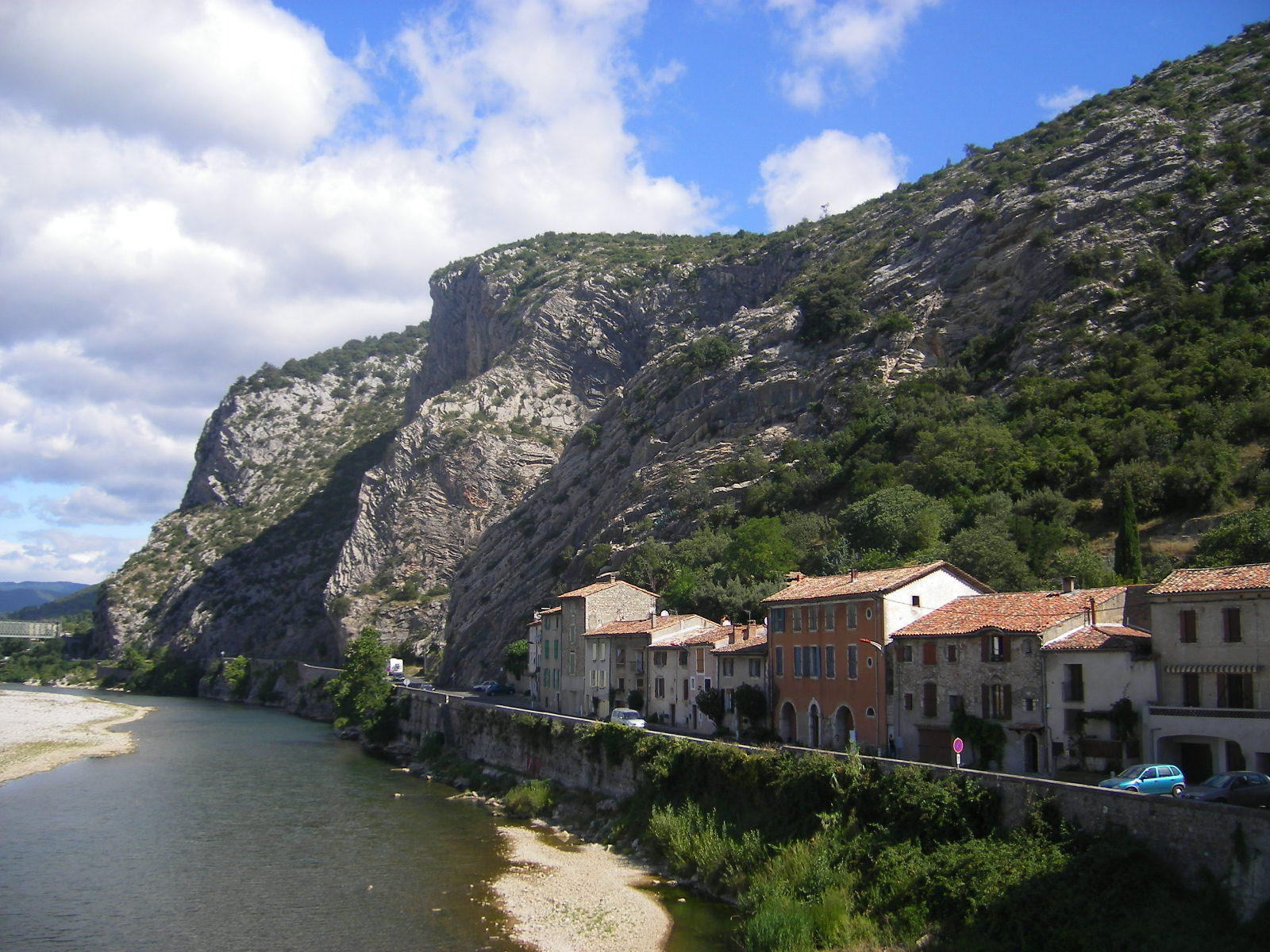
La route le long du « Gardon d'Anduze ».

== See also ==
- Communes of the Gard department
