= Pierre Gendron (academic) =

Canadian academic

Pierre Raoul Gendron
- Born: May 1, 1916; St. Hyacinthe, Quebec
- Died: February 16, 1984 (aged 67)

Pierre Raoul Gendron, CC FRSC (May 1, 1916 – February 16, 1984) was a Canadian academic who was the first dean of the Faculty of Pure and Applied Sciences at the University of Ottawa from 1953 until 1962.

As president of the board of directors of Dow Breweries, Gendron convinced the brewer to fund a planetarium in Montreal, overseeing the creation of the Dow Planetarium.

In 1970, he was made a Companion of the Order of Canada "for his scientific and administrative contribution to industry and his service to his community".
