= Louis Chaboillez =

Canadian politician

Louis Chaboillez (October 14, 1766 – July 19, 1813) was a notary and politician in Lower Canada. He represented Montreal East in the Legislative Assembly of Lower Canada from 1804 to 1808. He owned much real estate in Montreal and Chaboillez Square is named for him.

He was born Joseph-Louis Chaboillez in Montreal, the son of Louis-Joseph Chaboillez and Angélique Baby-Chenneville. He was the nephew of Charles-Jean-Baptiste Chaboillez, who was involved in the fur trade. He qualified to practice as a notary in 1787 and set up practice in Montreal. In 1789, he married Marguerite Conefroy. He served as a captain in the militia and a justice of the peace. After he retired from politics, he returned to practice as a notary. Chaboillez died in Montreal at the age of 46.
