= Chaboillez Square =

Town square in Montreal, Canada

- French: square Chaboillez
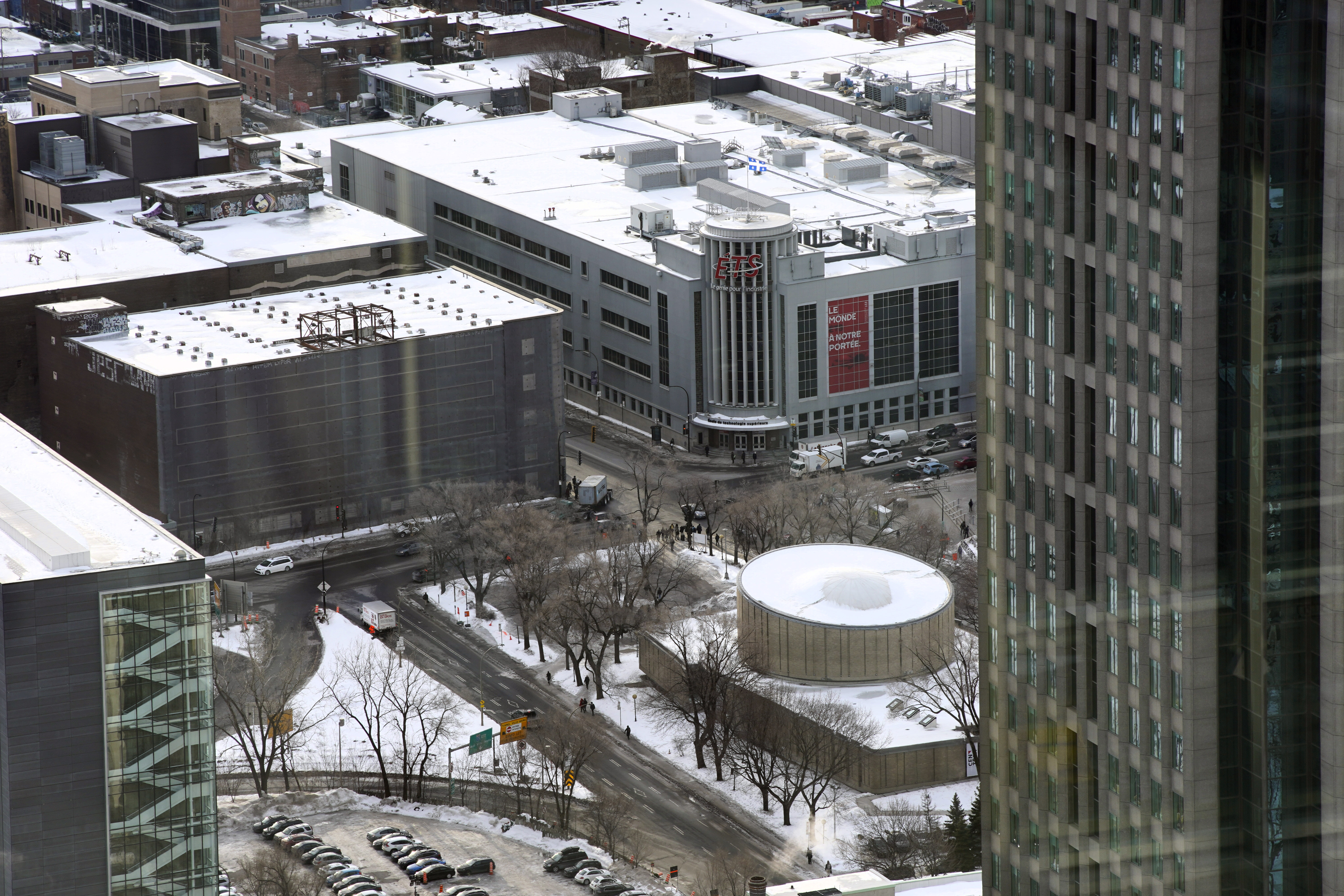
- The square as seen from Place Ville-Marie.

- Location within Montreal
- Interactive map of Chaboillez Square
- Type: Town square
- Location: Downtown Montreal, Ville-Marie Montreal, Quebec, Canada
- Coordinates: 45°29′47″N 73°33′52″W
- Created: 1813
- Operator: City of Montreal
- Status: Open all year

Chaboillez Square (French: square Chaboillez) is a town square located in Montreal, Quebec, Canada. It is located at the intersection of Saint Jacques Street and Peel Street in downtown Montreal. The former Dow Planetarium is located within the square.

== History ==
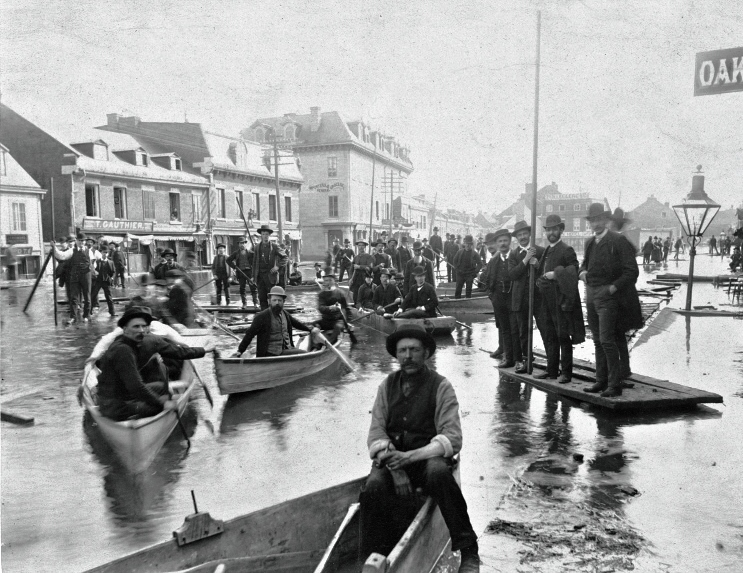
Flooding in 1886.

In 1813, Margaret Godfrey inherited a large tract of land from her husband, Louis Chaboillez. She yielded many plots of land to the City of Montreal including the lot known as Chaboillez Square (which was larger than it is today).

In 1886, flooding deluged the square.

The Square was completely refurbished in 1950 and reopened in 1953. Its size was reduced in the mid-1960s in planning for the coming of the Ville Marie Expressway. The Dow Planetarium (later known as Montreal Planetarium) was constructed in the square in 1966.

== Monuments ==
The square used to display two monuments:

- Nicolaus Copernicus Statue (1967) by Bertel Thorvaldsen
- Sundial (1968), by Herman J. van der Heide

When the Rio Tinto Alcan Planetarium was opened near the Olympic Stadium to replace the Montreal Planetarium, both monuments were moved near the new planetarium.
