= Dow Planetarium =

Decommissioned public planetarium in Montreal, Quebec, Canada

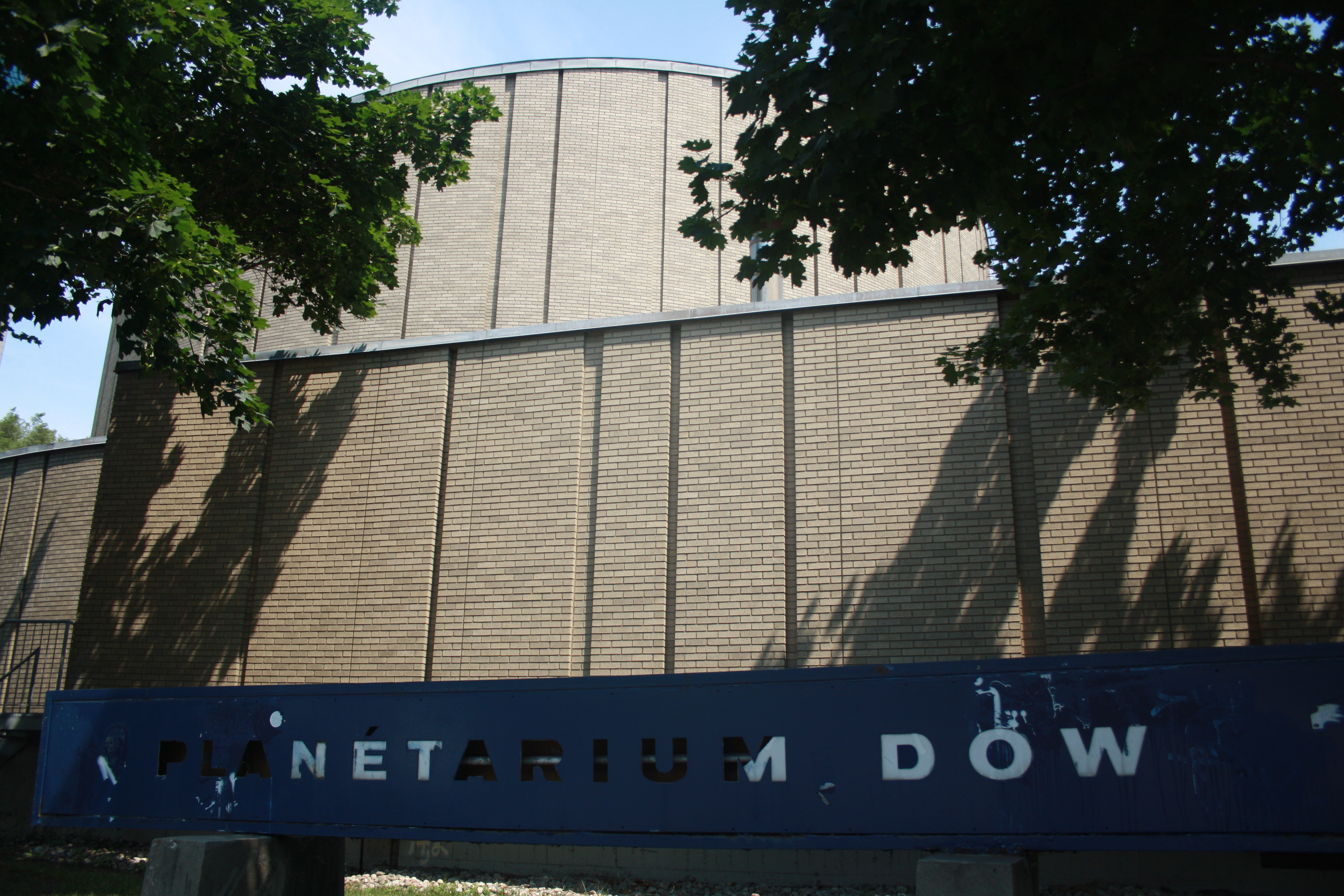

- Location of the Dow Planetarium in Montreal
- Established: 1 April 1966
- Dissolved: 11 October 2011
- Location: 1000 Saint Jacques Street, Montreal, Quebec, Canada
- Coordinates: 45.4961233°N 73.5638563°W
- Type: Planetarium
- Public transit access: Bonaventure
- Website: espacepourlavie.ca/en/planetarium

The Dow Planetarium (later renamed the Montreal Planetarium) is a decommissioned public planetarium located at Chaboillez Square southeast of downtown Montreal, Quebec, Canada. It closed permanently in October 2011. A new facility, the Rio Tinto Alcan Planetarium, near Olympic Stadium in Montreal, opened in April 2013.

== History ==
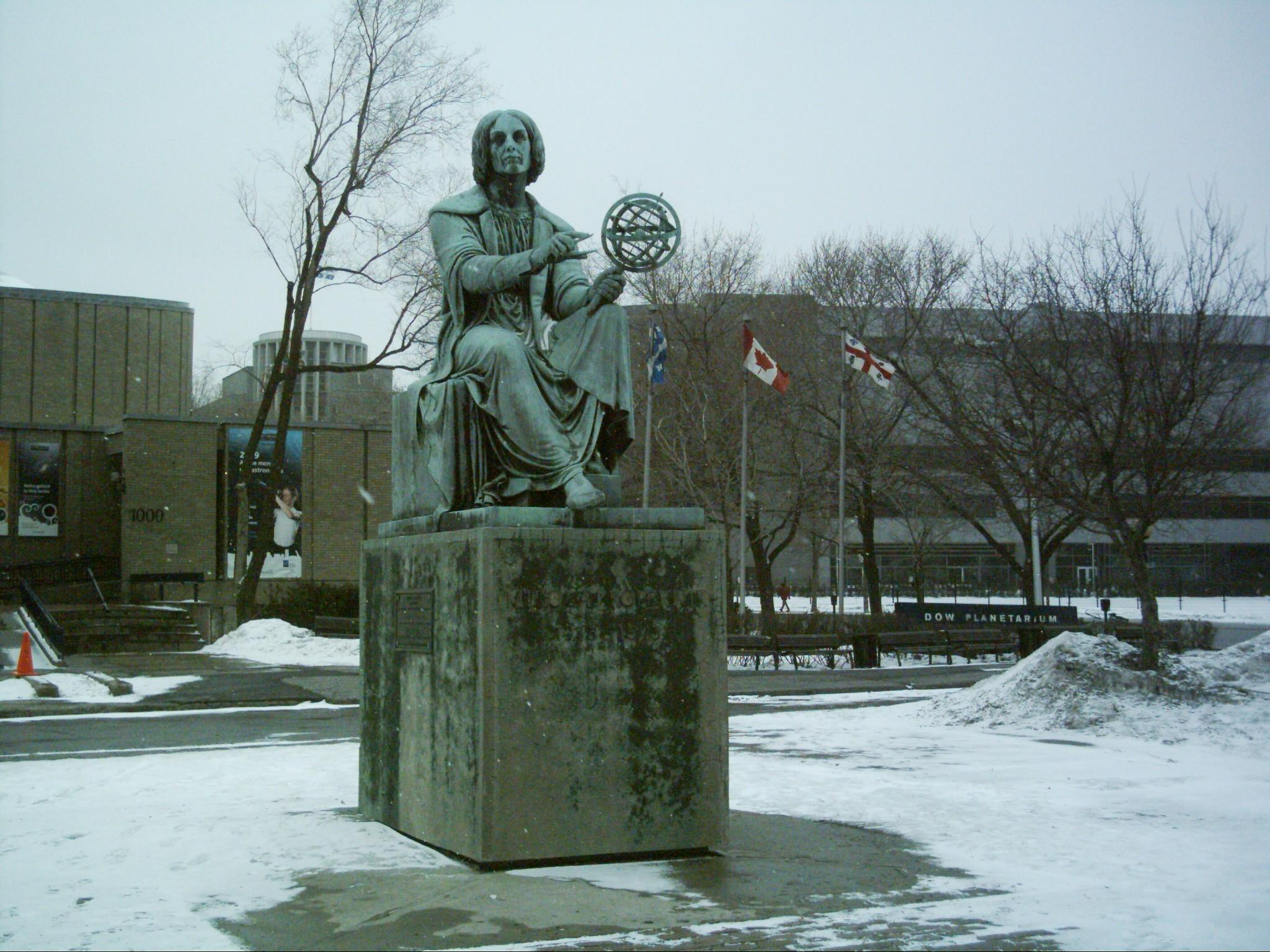
Statue of Nicolaus Copernicus.

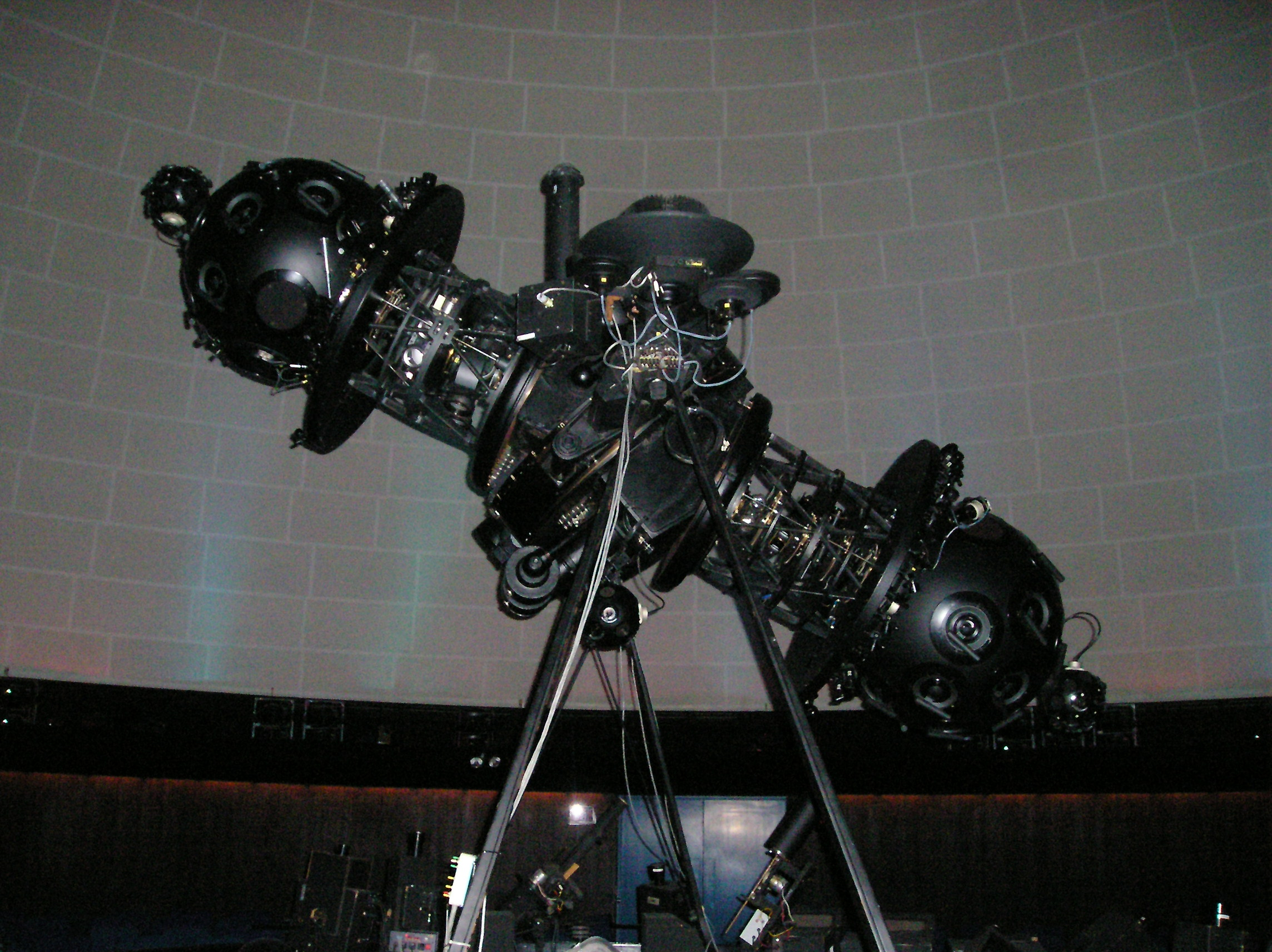
The Zeiss planetarium projector.

The planetarium was opened in advance of Expo 67 and inaugurated on April 1, 1966, by then-Montreal mayor Jean Drapeau. Its inaugural show, "New Skies for a New City", premiered on April 4, 1966. Work had commenced on the project more than three years before its launch, under the guidance of Dr. Pierre Gendron, a former professor of chemistry and founding dean of the Faculty of Science at the University of Ottawa, who was an avid amateur astronomer. As president of the board of directors of Dow Breweries, Gendron convinced Dow to create a world-class planetarium in Montreal as part of the Canadian Centennial celebrations.

The architectural firm selected for the project was David-Barott-Boulva. The chosen design had an astronomical theme and the exterior of the dome resembled Saturn surrounded by its rings. The Planetarium was built at a cost of $1.2 million on the site of the historic Bonaventure Station on Chaboillez Square near Old Montreal.

The Planetarium produced more than 250 shows, was visited by nearly six million spectators and made more than 58,000 presentations in both French and English. The Planetarium was one of Montreal's most popular tourist attractions.

== Closure of the Dow Planetarium ==
On October 10, 2011, the Dow Planetarium presented its final show. The city-owned building has since been ceded to the École de technologie supérieure, a major engineering school which is located nearby.

The Rio Tinto Alcan Planetarium opened in April 2013 as the successor to the Montreal Planetarium. It is located near the Olympic Stadium and the Biodome. The new installation has two separate theatres as well as exhibits on space and astronomy. The building is certified LEED Platinum.
