= Nicolaus Copernicus Monument =

Nicolaus Copernicus Monument may refer to:

- Nicolaus Copernicus Monument (Chicago)
- Nicolaus Copernicus Monument, Kraków
- Nicolaus Copernicus Monument, Montreal
- Nicolaus Copernicus Monument, Toruń
- Nicolaus Copernicus Monument, Warsaw
