= Furtak =

Furtak is a surname. Notable people with the surname include:

- Erin Marie Furtak (fl. from 1999), American scholar of science education
- Misia Furtak (born 1982), Polish rock musician
