= Misia (disambiguation) =

Misia may refer to:

- Misia (often stylized as MISIA) (born 1978), a Japanese R&B singer
- Mísia (1955–2024), a Portuguese fado singer
- Misia Sert (1872–1950), a Polish-French pianist and influential patron of the arts in Paris
- Misia Furtak, a singer and musician
- Misia Ff, Polish singer and bassist

== See also ==
- Mysia (disambiguation)
- Moesia
- Mizia
