= Den Ast =

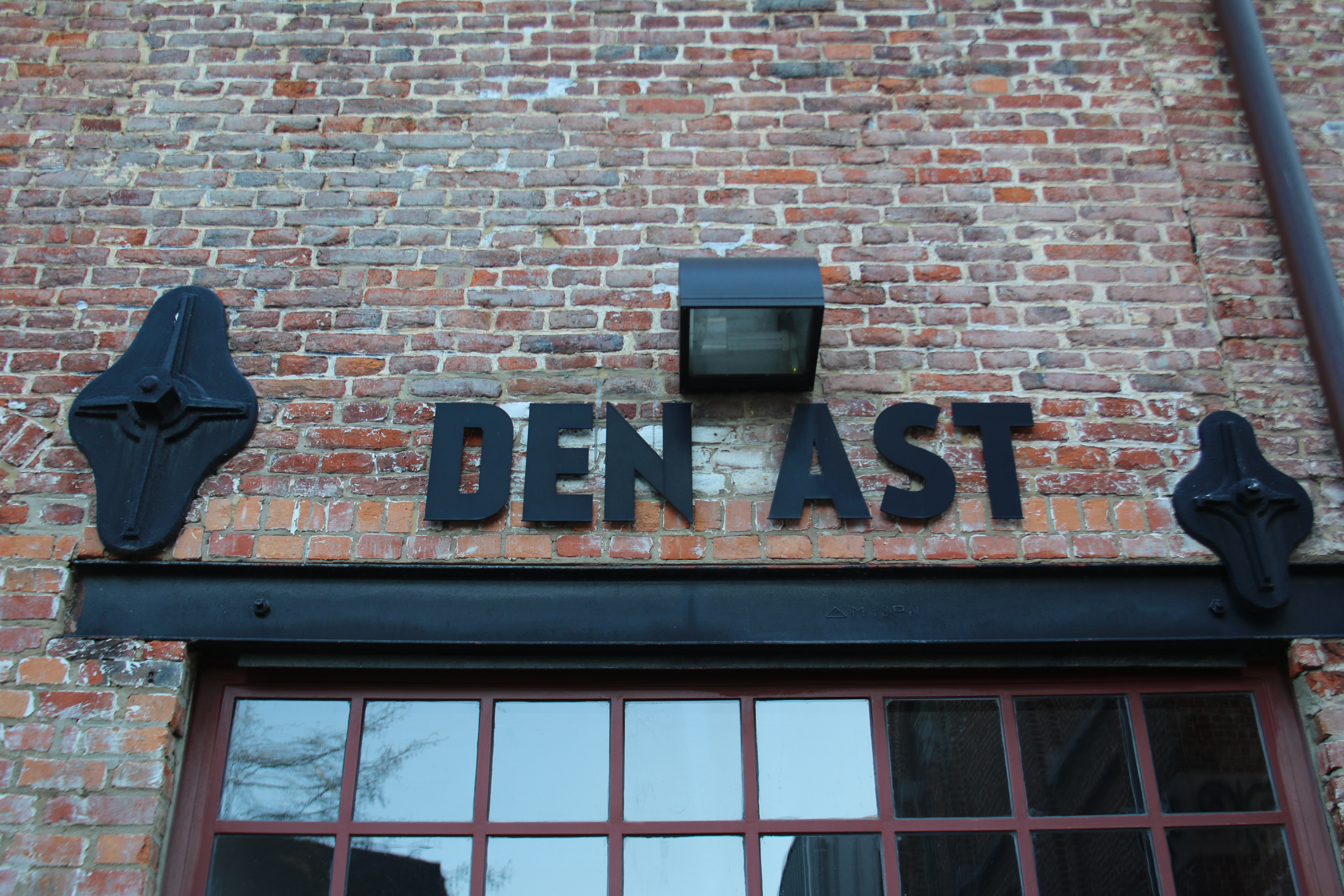
- Den AST in the former Van Roye maltery

- Location within Belgium
- Former name: South-West Brabant Museum
- Location: Halle, Belgium
- Coordinates: 50°44′17.431″N 4°14′11.819″E
- Type: Local museum
- Website: halle.be/denast

The Den Ast (stylised as: den AST) formerly South-West Brabant Museum (Dutch: Zuidwestbrabants Museum) is a local museum in Halle, Flemish Brabant, Belgium. From 1981, the museum was housed in a former college of Jesuits from the 17th century. After a closure of half a year in 2014, it was reopened in as Den Ast.

== Collections ==
It maintains and conserves around 20,000 pieces and is centered around archeology, music and the local histories of Halle, the Pajottenland, Zenne and Sonian.

The way of living of humans from earlier times is told. The museum rebuilt a worker's home from the 19th century. A detailed look is given to weaving, pottery, braiding baskets, city guards, forging noble metals, painting art, glass art, agriculture and pilgrimage.

Another section pays attention to local musicians, like the renowned cellist Adrien-François Servais (1807–1866) and his various family members including his musical sons Franz and Joseph, and granddaughter Misia Sert. It also contains material related to his sons-in-law Ernest Van Dyck and Polish sculptor Cyprien Godebski.

In Den Ast, it is located at the former establishment of the Van Roye malt house. The ground floor has material covering eight hundred years of history of the city, including the pilgrimage for the Virgin Mary. The first floor is focused on the musical culture in the city and carnival. An experience trail leads through the old malt house.

The amount of the collection exhibited here is smaller than in the former Jesuit college. The museum plans to change the exhibits every four to five years to display more of their holdings. It also has digital presentations.

== See also ==
- List of museums in Belgium
- List of music museums
