= Cyprian Godebski (sculptor) =

Polish sculptor (1835–1909)

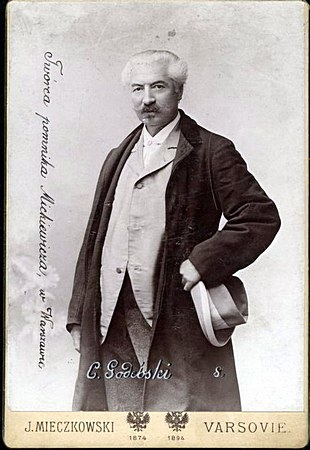
- Cyprian Godebski, c. 1909
- Born: 30 October 1835; Méry-sur-Cher
- Died: 25 November 1909 (aged 74); Paris
- Known for: Sculpture
- Notable work: Nicolaus Copernicus Monument in Kraków, Adam Mickiewicz Monument, Warsaw, Statue of Adrien François Servais
- Movement: Realism
- Children: Misia Sert

Cyprian Godebski (30 October 1835 – 25 November 1909) was a Polish sculptor known in the Russian Empire and Paris. From 1870 he was a professor at the Imperial Academy of Arts in St. Petersburg. He was the grandson of Polish poet and novelist Cyprian Godebski, creator of the "Legions poetry" genre, who had served in Napoleon's Polish Legions.

Cyprian Godebski is remembered for having won the contest for the Adam Mickiewicz Monument in Kraków. But he lost that commission to a newcomer, Teodor Rygier, whose more popular design was ultimately adopted by the city in 1889.

Godebski, however, was commissioned for his equally revered Mickiewicz monument in Warsaw, erected 10 years later on Krakowskie Przedmieście, for which he was awarded 50,000 rubles by the committee to Erect the Adam Mickiewicz Monument (Społeczny Komitet Budowy Pomnika). The Warsaw statue was destroyed by German Nazis in 1942 during World War II. It was recreated in 1955 using the head and a fragment of the torso recovered in Hamburg.

== Biography ==
Godebski received his art education at the Paris studio of sculptor François Jouffroy. He lived and worked in Lwów from 1858 and in 1861 moved to Vienna, where he worked on commissions from the Imperial court of Austro-Hungary. In 1863 Godebski moved to Paris again, and lived alternately in France and in Belgium. In 1870 he accepted the nomination for the professorship at the Imperial Russian Academy of Arts and moved to St. Petersburg for several years. He lived in Warsaw in 1870 and 1875.

Godebski married Zofia Servais, Russian-Belgian daughter of renowned Belgian cellist Adrien-François Servais (1807-1866) and his wife. He and Zofia had a daughter, Maria Zofia Godebska, known by the diminutive Misia, but the mother died shortly after her birth in 1872. Godebski sent the infant girl to his late wife's family in Halle, Belgium to be raised for several years.

Godebski married again after Zofia's death, to sculptor Matylda Rosen. (He later remarried again.) While they were living in Warsaw in 1875, they ran an artistic salon for the local elite. Following his return to Paris, Godebski organized a new popular artistic and literary salon.

=== Honors ===
In 1877, he was nominated as a member of the French National Academy. In 1889 Godebski received the medal and title of the Chevalier of the Legion of Honour. From 1897 he was the first president of the Artistic and Literary Club of Paris.

=== Legacy ===
After several years, Godebski had reclaimed his daughter Misia and brought her to Paris, where she was educated at Sacre Coeur, a convent boarding school. Among her teachers was Gabriel Fauré, who taught piano. When she first left home she supported herself by giving piano lessons to students he referred to her.

Starting as a pianist in Paris, and later known as Misia Sert, she hosted artistic salons for decades. (She was married three times.) Misia was a muse to Toulouse Lautrec and others, and had considerable influence within early 20th-century Parisian artistic circles. Misia (Godebska) Sert became a friend of Proust, poet Mallarmé, and artist painters such as Monet and Renoir, as well as musicians. Maurice Ravel dedicated several compositions to her. Sert was the business partner and best friend of Serge de Diaghilev, impresario of the influential Ballets Russes.

A collection on Godebski's life and work is held by the South-West Brabant Museum in Halle, Belgium, the longtime home of his father-in-law Servais.

== Works ==
- Bust of Gioachino Rossini, Paris (1865).
- Monument to Independence in Lima, Peru, (1856–1859)
- Adam Mickiewicz Monument in Warsaw (1898)
- Allegories and grave statues in Paris, France, to Théophile Gautier and Hector Berlioz at Montmartre and Père-Lachaise, respectively
- Statue to Artur Grottger in Lwow
- Monument to Aleksander Fredro in front of Słowacki Theatre in Kraków Old Town near Planty Park
- Monument to astronomer Nicolaus Copernicus at the Collegium Novum, Kraków University
- Genius and Brute Force (1888) white marble, 2.6 m, state commission, Toulon Musée d'art and Musée Sainte-Croix in Poitiers, France
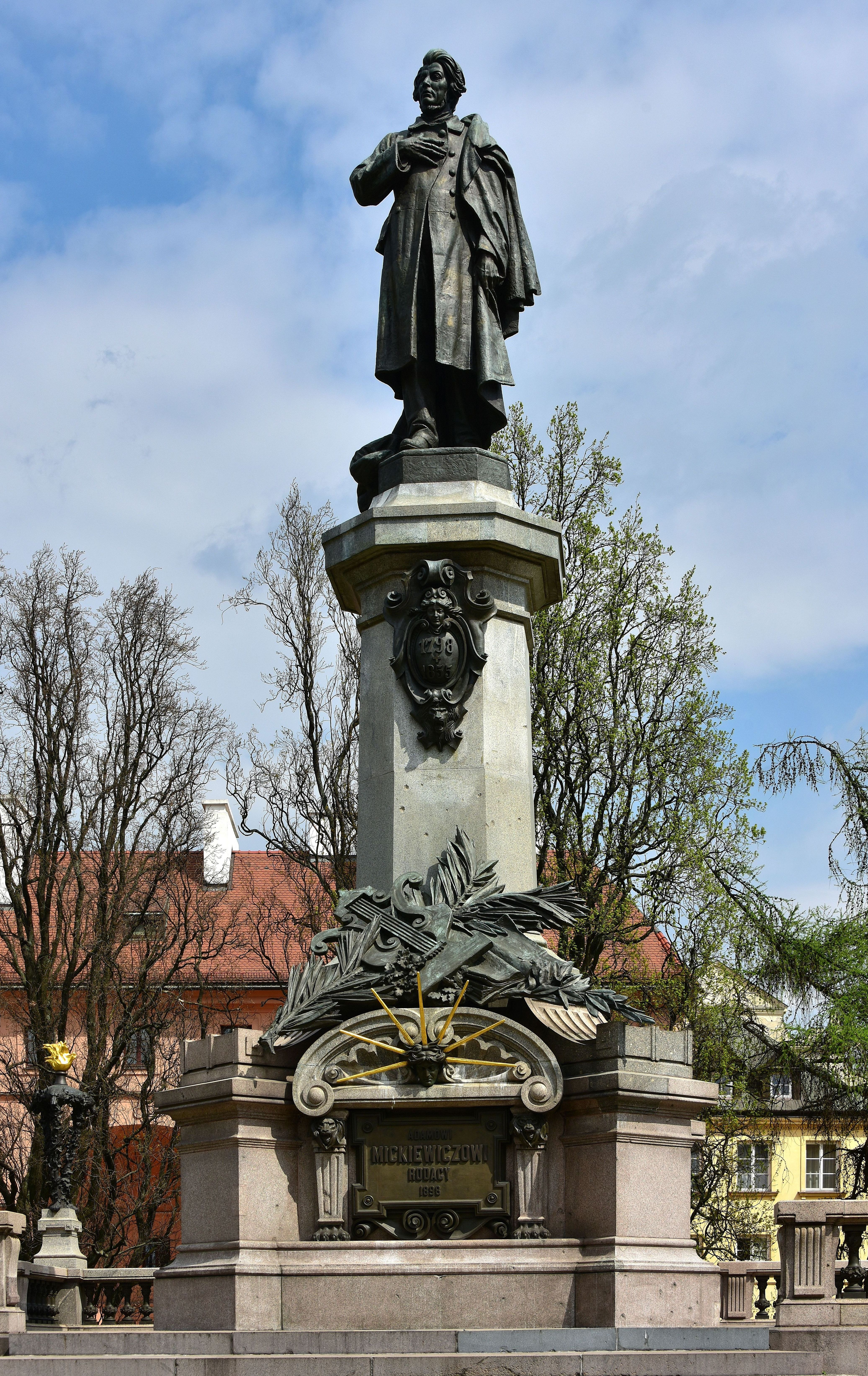
Godebski's Adam Mickiewicz Monument, Warsaw

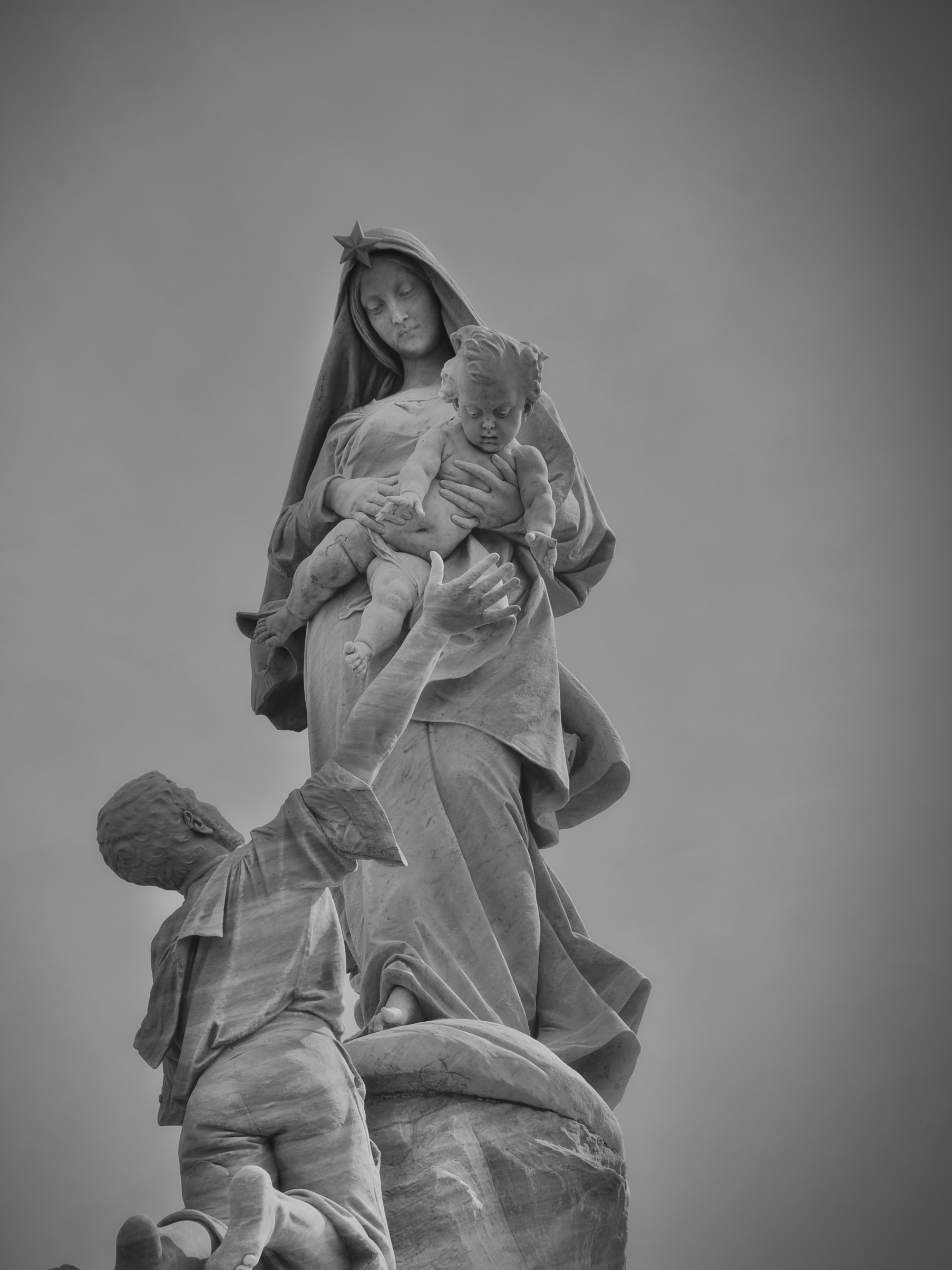
Our Lady of the Shipwrecked (Cyprian Godebski) - Pointe du Raz - France

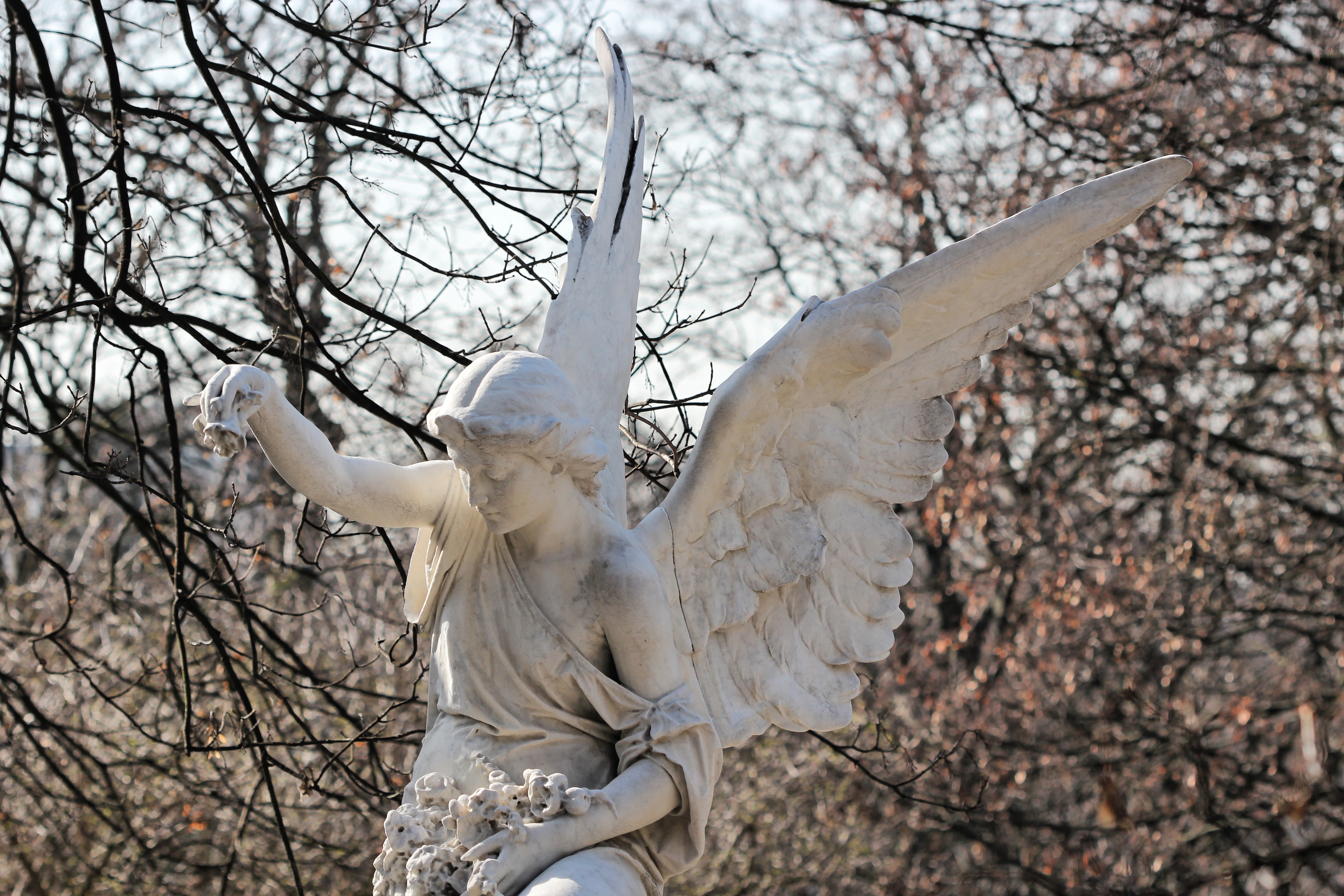
Angel by Cyprian Godebski on Galezowski and Tamberlick families' tomb, Père Lachaise Cemetery

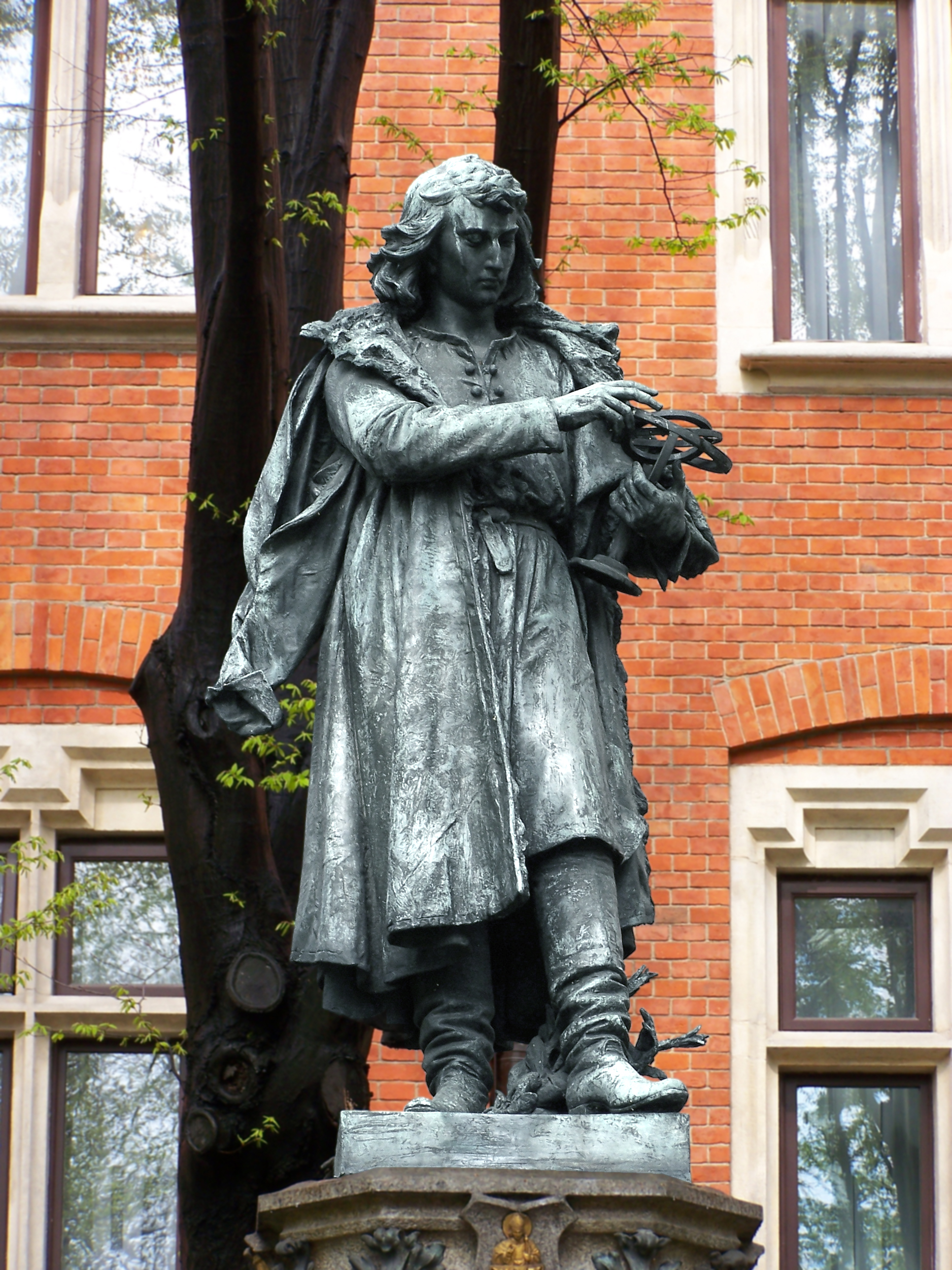
Nicolaus Copernicus Monument in Kraków
