= Mysia (disambiguation) =

Mysia was an ancient region in northwest Anatolia.

Mysia may also refer to:

- Mysia, Victoria, a town in Australia
- Mysia, the layers of connective tissue in muscles

== See also ==
- Misia (disambiguation)
