= Statue of Adam Mickiewicz (Warsaw) =

Coordinates: 52°14′37″N 21°0′53″E

- Pomnik Adama Mickiewicza
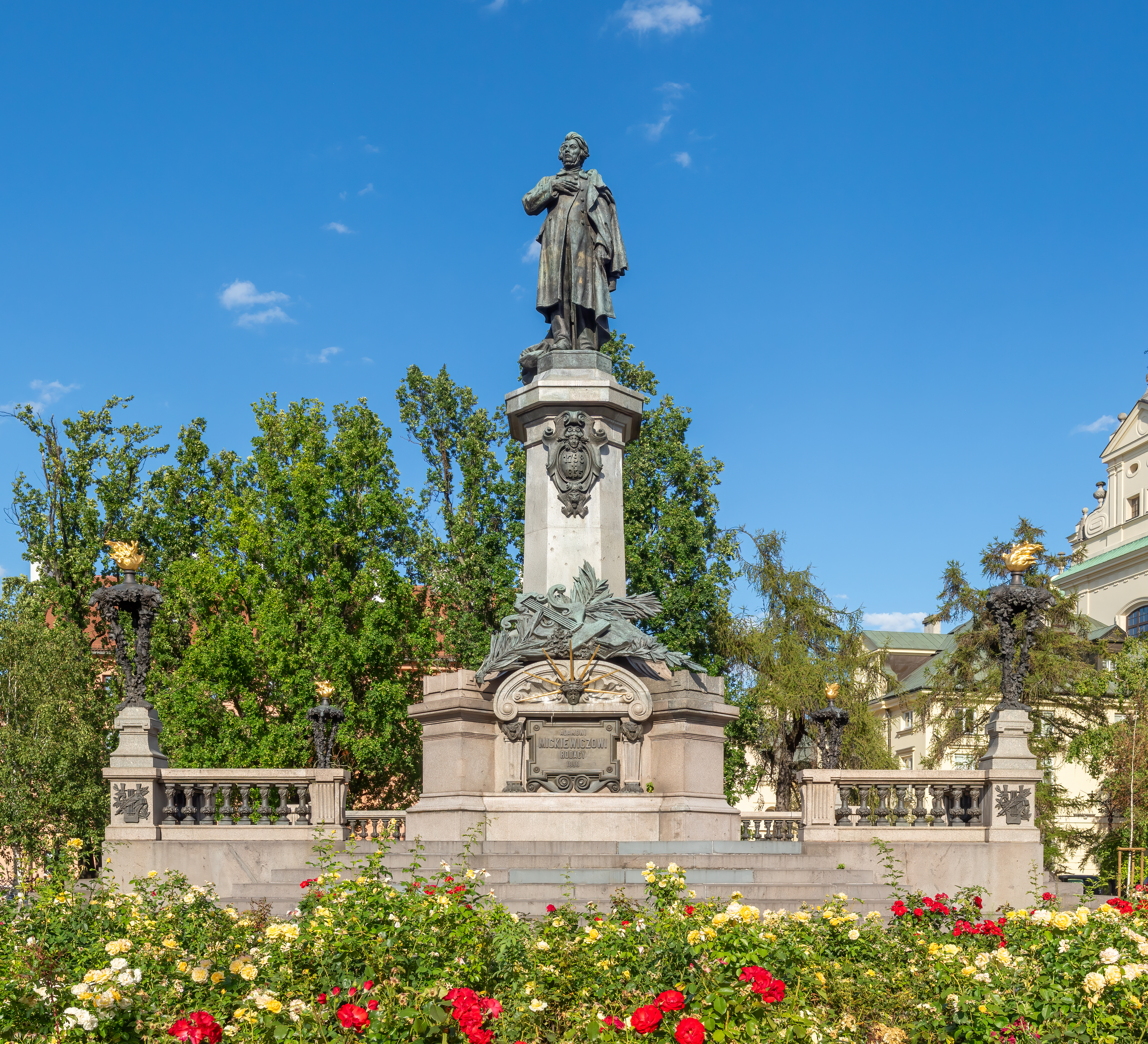
- Interactive map of Statue of Adam Mickiewicz
- Location: Warsaw, Poland
- Designer: Cyprian Godebski
- Type: Neo-Classicist monument
- Beginning date: 1897
- Completion date: 1898; 128 years ago
- Dedicated to: Adam Mickiewicz

Historic Monument of Poland
- Designated: 1994-09-08
- Part of: Warsaw – historic city center with the Royal Route and Wilanów
- Reference no.: M.P. 1994 nr 50 poz. 423

The statue of Adam Mickiewicz (Polish: Pomnik Adama Mickiewicza) is a monument dedicated to Adam Mickiewicz at the Krakowskie Przedmieście in the Śródmieście district of Warsaw, Poland. The Neo-Classicist monument was constructed in 1897–1898 by sculptor Cyprian Godebski. It was unveiled on the 100th anniversary of the poet's birth.

== History ==
On 13 February 1897 the Głos magazine published an article promoting the idea of building the monument. Other newspapers soon followed the idea. Writer Henryk Sienkiewicz helped to raise awareness among the Warsaw intelligentsia, and by his effort, the Russian authorities permitted the construction of the monument.

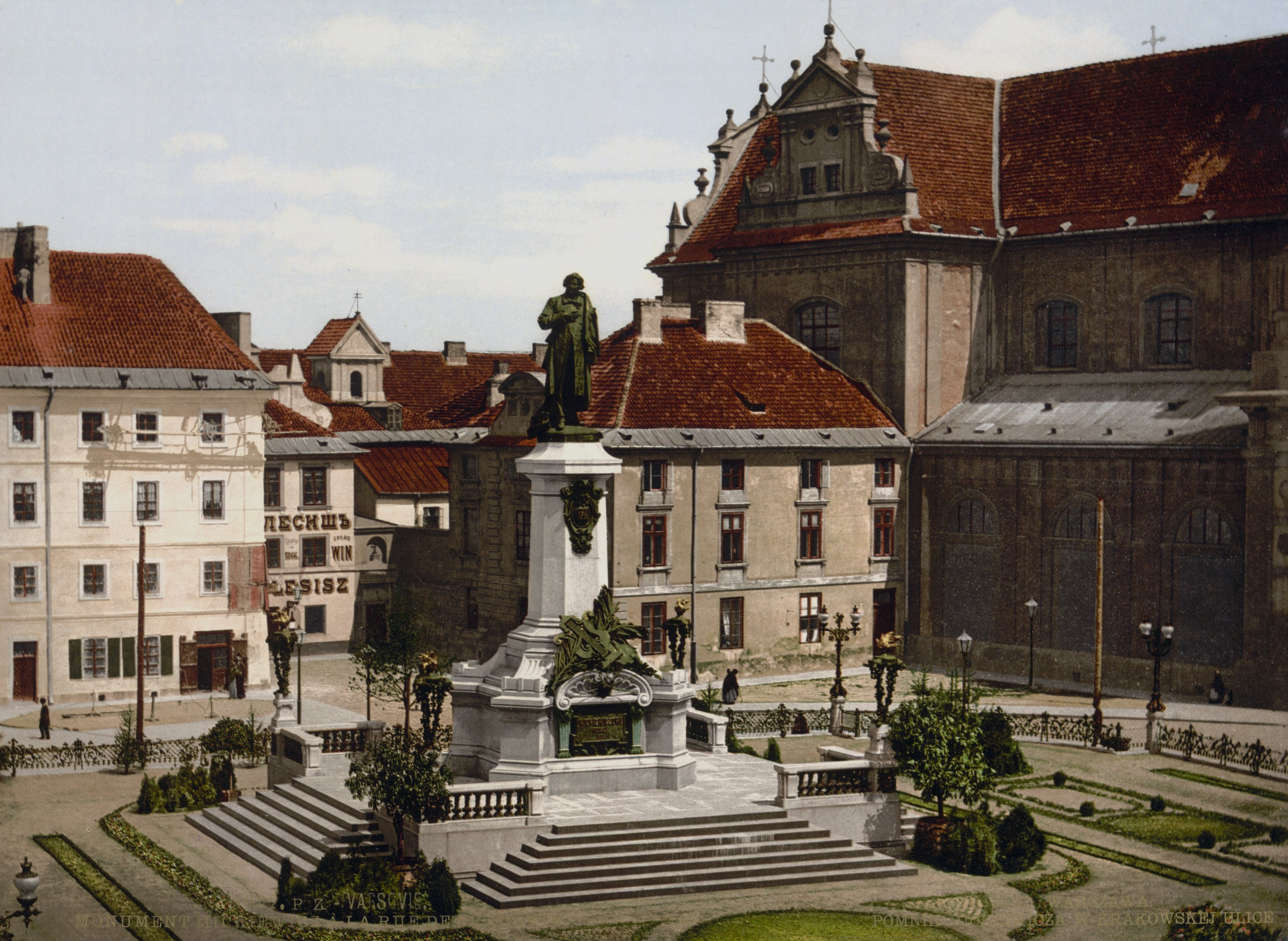
Adam Mickiewicz Monument, ca. 1900

A public committee was founded by Sienkiewicz, Count Michał Radziwiłł and Zygmunt Wasilewski. The committee asked people for financial contributions to help build the monument. The financial support was quickly raised, and the work was assigned to renowned Polish sculptor Cyprian Godebski.

The monument was built on a place where several buildings, demolished in 1865, had been located. From 1897 it was sculpted by Godebski in Italy. The 4.2 m-tall bronze statue was cast in Pistoia, Italy. Red granite column and foundations were produced by an Italian company in Baveno near Milan.

The statue shows Mickiewicz standing tall, with his head slightly raised and his right hand laid upon his heart. The monument was ceremonially unveiled on 24 December 1898 on the 100th anniversary of poet's birth. While initially planned to be very large, the ceremony was scaled back as Tsarist authorities feared that it could turn into a patriotic manifestation of Polish desire for independence. They banned all marches and speeches. The monument was unveiled in silence, in front of 12,000 people.

After suppressing the Warsaw Uprising in 1944 and destroying part of the city, Nazi forces also deliberately destroyed this monument. They eventually transported remaining parts of the monument to Germany. After the war, Polish soldiers found the head and several parts of the statue in Hamburg.

Sculptor Jan Szczepkowski was commissioned to produce a copy of the original statue. The environs around the monument were also restored. The reproduction was unveiled on 28 January 1950. The last parts of the monument were returned to Poland as late as the 1980s.
