= Très.b =

Indie rock band

très.b
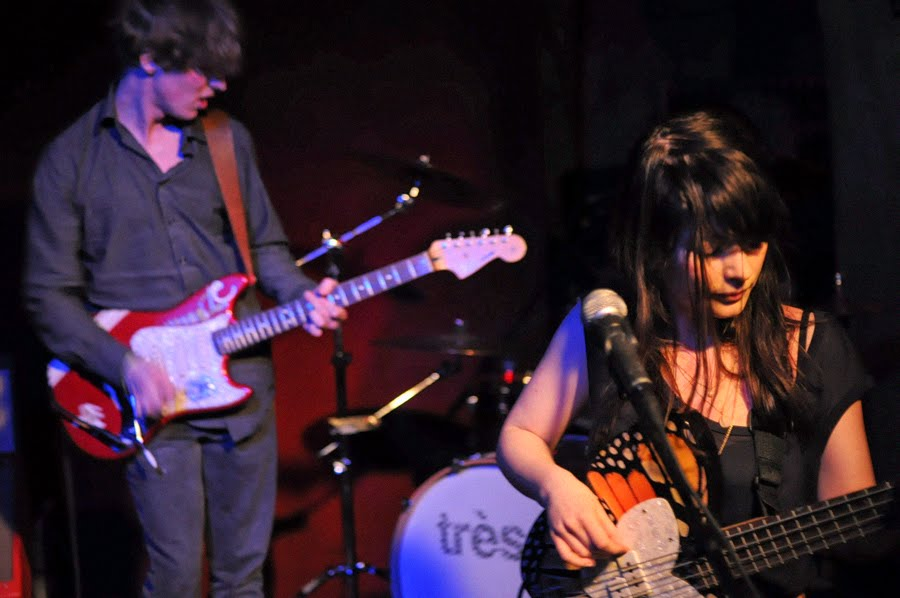
- très.b performing live on-stage

Background information
- Origin: Denmark
- Genres: Alternative rock, indie rock, indie pop, dream pop
- Years active: 2005–2013
- Label: Pomaton EMI
- Members: Misia Furtak, Olivier Heim, Thomas Pettit
- Website: www.emimusic.pl/artysci,,tres_b

très.b was an international indie rock band consisting of a Polish singer Misia Furtak, half Danish/half English drummer Thomas Pettit and a half Dutch/half American guitarist Olivier Heim, also known under his solo artist name Anthony Chorale. The band started at a Danish hojskole, to later move to the Netherlands and Poland.

== History ==
The band first self-released an EP (Neon Chameleon 2006) and an album called Scylla and Charybdis (2007). In June 2010 they signed to Pomaton EMI in Poland and their most recent full-length major-label debut, The Other Hand, came out 21 September. The album was recorded in Warsaw in Studio 333 and produced by Bartłomiej Kuźniak and Olivier Heim. It was mixed in New York City by Victor Van Vugt. It has been well received, and in May 2011 the band was awarded with Fryderyk 2011 as Best Debut of the Year. très.b has given over 150 performances at festivals and venues all over Europe. The band shared the stage with acts like TV On The Radio, Jamie Lidell, Spiritualized, Seabear, and Asteroids Galaxy Tour.

In December 2011 it was announced that the band was ready to record a new album, and that they want to crowd fund it by selling the not-yet-recorded CD, a ticket to a release event (or another show), and a thank you note on the album as a package directly to their fans. This was the first album crowdfunded this way in Poland.

In February 2012 the band went to record the album at The Rolling Tapes Studio in Srebrna Góra, Poland, with Michał Kupicz (Indigo Tree, Enchanted Hunters), who also mixed the record. The album was produced by Michał Kupicz and Olivier Heim. The band recorded everything live, which resulted in the whole recording process taking only 6 days.

The band used unusual ideas to promote the release, e.g. the title was announced in a set of riddles and the first single, before the official radio premiere, was streamed by a local espresso bar where fans could hear it with a set of headphones attached to the wall, after they received GPS coordinates to find the location.

The album 40 Winks of Courage was released 15 May 2012 and received very good reviews: "One of the best alternative records of last years, immediately marked with that 'must have' sticker" Music Is, "Great pleasure for a sensitive listener" Polityka, "Very coherent. Forced me to give it a very warm welcome"; Bartek Chaciński. Furthermore, in August 2012 Uwolnij Muzykę placed "40 winks of courage" as #2 of "best album of 2012 -first half".

In January 2013 the band was awarded with the Paszport Polityki. The band toured extensively until December 2013 and went on a sabbatical. They have not been active since.

== Discography ==
- 40 Winks of Courage (2012)
- The Other Hand (2010)
- Scylla and Charybdys (unofficial) (2007)

=== EPs and singles ===
- OLA single (2008)
- Neon Chameleon EP (2006)

== Videography ==
- "Let It Shine" (June 2012, by Lava Films)
- "Like Is" (April 2012, by ImagePro.pl)
- "Venus Untied" (December 2010, directed by DDBC Creative Design)
- "Orange, Apple" (August 2010, directed by Misia Furtak, made by Très.B, Monika Baran, Żaneta Pać and Mirka Duijn)
- "Ola" (2008, directed by Flim en Zoonen)

== Awards ==
Year	Nominee / work	Award	Result
Fryderyk 2011	Très.B	FRYDERYK Best Debut Of The Year (Fonograficzny Debiut Roku)	Won
Paszport Polityki 2012	Très.B	Paszport Polityki, Muzyka Popularna	Won

=== Charts ===
Rok	Tytuł	Pozycja na liście
Rok	Tytuł	LP3
2012	Like Is	nie notowany
2012	Let it shine	10
