= Ernest Van Dyck =

Belgian opera singer (1861–1923)

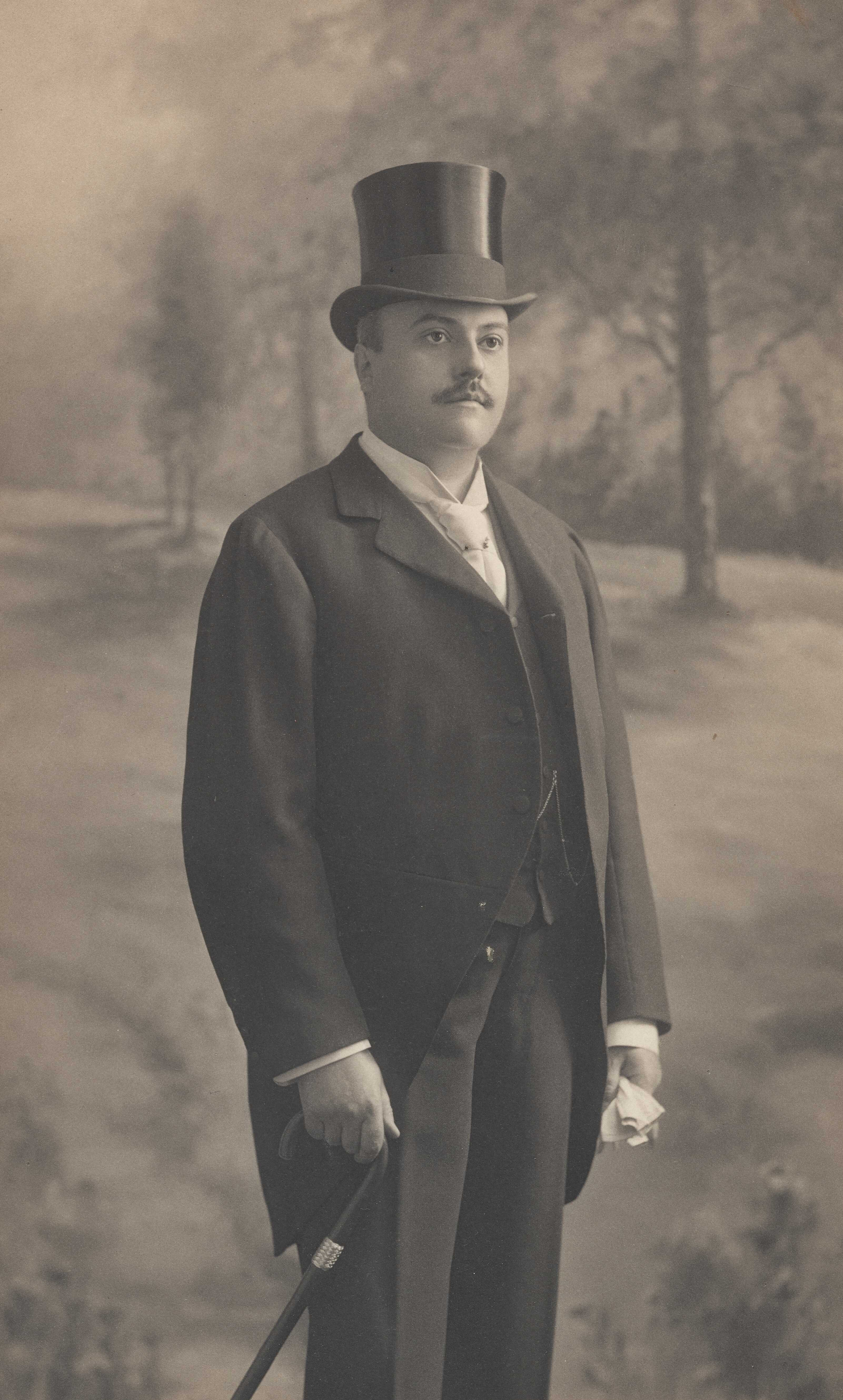
Ernest Van Dyck, c. 1898 (Newberry Library, Chicago)

Ernest Van Dyck or Van Dĳck (Dutch pronunciation: [vɑn ˈdɛik], 2 April 1861 – 31 August 1923) was a Belgian dramatic tenor who was closely identified with the Wagnerian repertoire.

== Biography ==
A native of Antwerp, where he was educated in a Jesuit school, Van Dyck studied both law and philosophy in Leuven before deciding to become an opera singer. The notary under whom he was studying introduced him to the conductor Joseph Dupont. He became a journalist, working for Le Courrier de l'Escaut in Antwerp and La Patrie in Paris.

From his arrival in Paris and debut at the Concerts Lamoureux in the first act of Tristan und Isolde he studied with Emmanuel Chabrier and became a close friend of the composer. The singer repaid Chabrier by advocating for performances of his operas in Karlsruhe and other places where he appeared. During the years appearing at the Orchestre Lamoureux concerts, Van Dyck sang in La Damnation de Faust, fragments from Sigurd, Tristan und Isolde, Die Walküre, Les Sept péchés capitaux of Otto Goldschmidt, and the premiere of Le Chant de la Cloche by Vincent d'Indy.

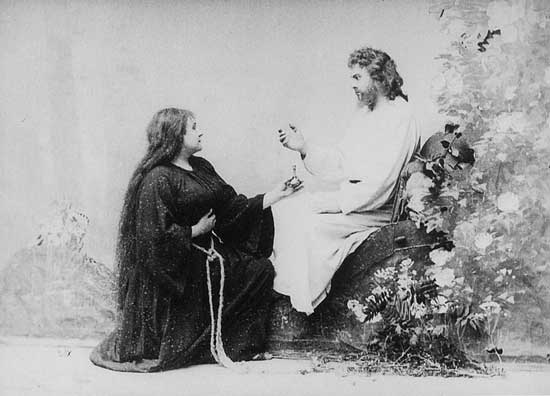
Van Dyck and Amalie Materna as Parsifal and Kundry at Bayreuth in 1889

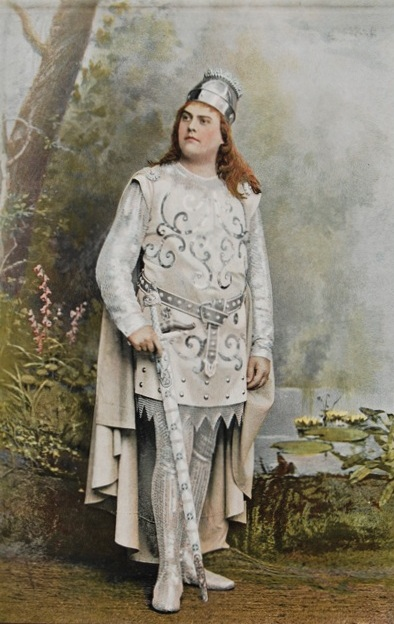
Van Dyck as Lohengrin, 1895

In Paris he studied singing with Saint-Yves Bax before making his stage debut at the Théâtre Éden on 3 May 1887; the occasion marked the French premiere of Lohengrin. Intensive study with Felix Mottl followed before he appeared as Parsifal at the Bayreuth Festival in 1888, with great success. The intensity of his acting was praised in particular and he was invited back to Bayreuth on repeated occasions, where he became a proponent of the Sprechgesang style of operatic vocalism.

The Vienna State Opera soon engaged him, and he remained with the company for a decade, during which time he created the title-role in Massenet's Werther (16 February 1892). He also made guest appearances throughout Europe; among these, he featured in the British premiere of Wilhelm Kienzl's Der Evangelimann in London in 1897. Van Dyck made his American debut on 29 November 1898, singing Tannhäuser at the Metropolitan Opera. He stayed in New York City until the 1901–02 season, singing not only Wagner roles but also parts in French operas. Having made his debut at Covent Garden in 1891, in 1907 he undertook a season of German opera there. In 1914 he appeared in the first performances in Paris of Parsifal. For the Musica journal, no. 13, October 1903, he wrote an article on "Richard Wagner et l'interprétation".

Van Dyck sang in the first performance of Debussy's L'enfant prodigue in Paris on 27 July 1884. With Camille de Roddaz, Van Dyck provided the libretto for Massenet's ballet set in Courtrai ('Légende mimée et dansée en un acte') Le Carillon, for the Vienna State Opera in February 1892.

He appeared regularly at the Theatre de la Monnaie in Brussels in 1894, where his repertoire included Wagner (Lohengrin, Tannhäuser, Tristan) and Massenet (Werther, Des Grieux).

Van Dyck made a few acoustic records in the early 1900s (for Pathé, Fonotipia and Homophone) which show a voice prematurely past its prime after a dozen years of hard, declamatory use in heavy Wagnerian parts. He died in Berlaar, Belgium, in 1923.

He was awarded several civic honors: Chevalier de la Légion d'honneur, Order of Leopold, Order of Franz Joseph, the Order of Saint Stanislaus, the Order of the Zähringer Lion, the Star of Romania.

The South-West Brabant Museum in Halle, Belgium, has a collection on his life and work.
