= Nicolaus Copernicus Monument, Toruń =

Monument in Poland

Nicolaus Copernicus Monument
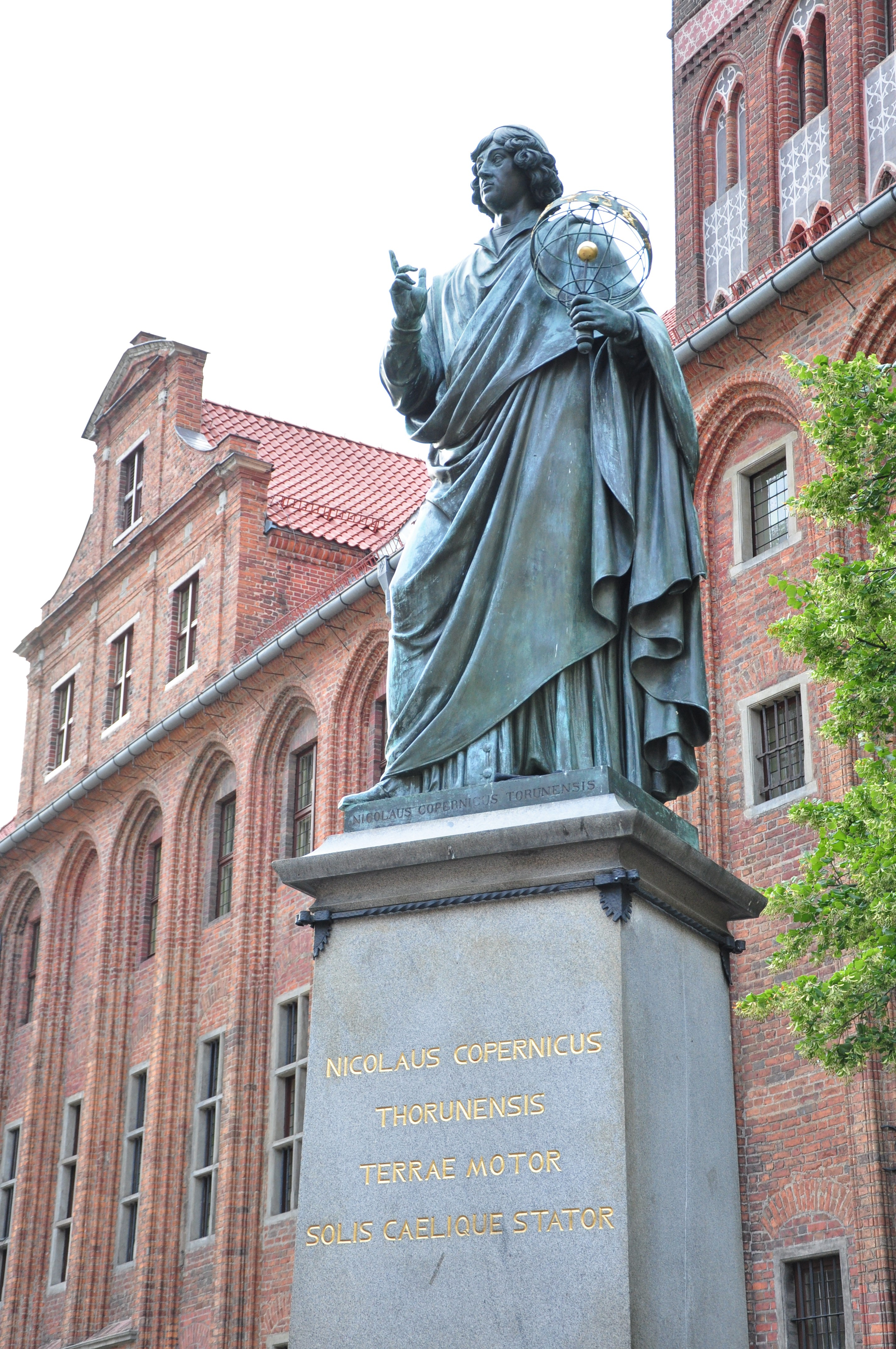
- Monument to Copernicus, inscribed: "Nicolaus Copernicus Thorunensis, terrae motor, solis caelique stator"
- Interactive map of Nicolaus Copernicus Monument
- Location: Toruń, Poland
- Coordinates: 53°00′37″N 18°36′18″E
- Beginning date: 1852
- Completion date: 1853
- Dedicated to: Nicolaus Copernicus

UNESCO World Heritage Site
- Type: Cultural
- Criteria: ii, iv
- Designated: 1997
- Part of: Medieval Town of Toruń
- Reference no.: 835

Historic Monument of Poland
- Designated: 8 September 1994
- Part of: Toruń – Old and New Town
- Reference no.: M.P. z 1994 r. Nr 50, poz. 422

The Nicolaus Copernicus Monument in Toruń is a monument of astronomer Nicolaus Copernicus (1473–1543) erected in his home town in 1853 by a "monument committee" of the city's residents.

== Original plans ==
King Frederick the Great of Prussia (1712–1786) intended to erect a monument at Copernicus' grave in Frauenburg (Frombork), but the grave could not be located.

Astronomer Nicolaus Copernicus (1473–1543) lived in Thorn (Toruń), then in the Kingdom of Poland, for many years. In the late 18th century, Poland was partitioned and the city of Thorn passed to Prussia. From 1807 to 1813, the city was part of the Duchy of Warsaw, governed by Frederick Augustus I of Saxony. A monument to Copernicus was then planned by the Polish scientist and philosopher Stanisław Staszic, after he had heard that Napoleon had expressed surprise during a visit to Thorn in 1807 that there was no monument there to Copernicus. Polish Roman Catholic clergy likewise supported the erection of a monument. In 1809 Napoleon commissioned Bertel Thorvaldsen and on Staszic's initiative, a cornerstone was laid for a monument. However, at the time, Prussian authorities, who were still nominally in charge of the city, would not approve the full construction of the monument. The fall of Napoleon ended the existence of the Duchy of Warsaw, restoring full control of Thorn to the Prussian authorities and delaying the Thorn monument project and eventually forcing Staszic to change the venue to Warsaw, in the Russian part of Poland, where the monument designed by Bertel Thorvaldsen was completed in 1830.

After the Napoleonic Wars, Thorn was made part of the Kingdom of Prussia, and local German citizens campaigned for and received the go-ahead for the monument that was eventually completed in that city in 1853.

== Funding and building ==
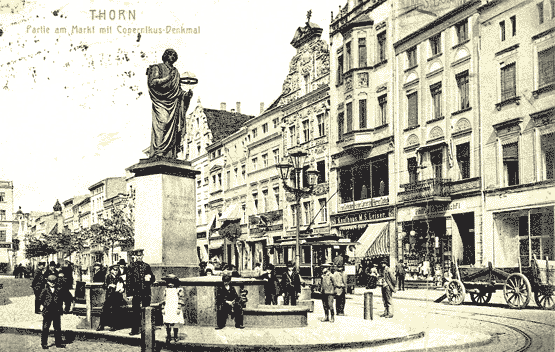
German postcard: "Thorn—part of the marketplace, with statue of Copernicus"

On 19 February 1839, the astronomer's birthday, a committee of twelve citizens was founded to promote a monument. In May 1839 King Frederick William III of Prussia approved the collection of donations, but he died soon afterward, and it was Frederick William IV who donated the largest share of the money, 3,466 Prussian thalers. The total cost was 10,449 thalers, almost half of which was for the casting in bronze by Fischer in Berlin. The clay model was the last work of Christian Friedrich Tieck (1776–1851).

The statue, twice-life-size on a 16-foot pedestal, was in 1856 considered one of only eight monuments to Copernicus. Having fulfilled its task, the committee continued its activities as a society called Coppernicus-Verein für Wissenschaft und Kunst zu Thorn (Copernicus Association for Science and Art in Thorn). For many years the Association was headed by Leopold Prowe.

== Monument ==
The monument presents Copernicus in academic dress. His left hand holds an astrolabe, and his right index finger points to the heavens. This symbolizes Copernicus' connection with astronomy and celestial studies. The monument is surrounded by stone benches and an adjoining stone water well.

The pedestal bears a Latin inscription drawn up by Alexander von Humboldt: "Nicolaus Copernicus Thorunensis, terrae motor, solis caelique stator" ("Nicolaus Copernicus of Thorun, mover of the earth, stopper of the sun and heavens").

== Renovations ==
In 2003, on the 150th anniversary of its construction, the monument was renovated. As part of the renovations, the stone water well and the dolphin's mouth at the foot of the statue were restored. Celebrations of the 150th anniversary of the monument were held on 25 October 2003, attended by the Marshal of the Sejm of the Republic of Poland, Marek Borowski.

== Gallery ==
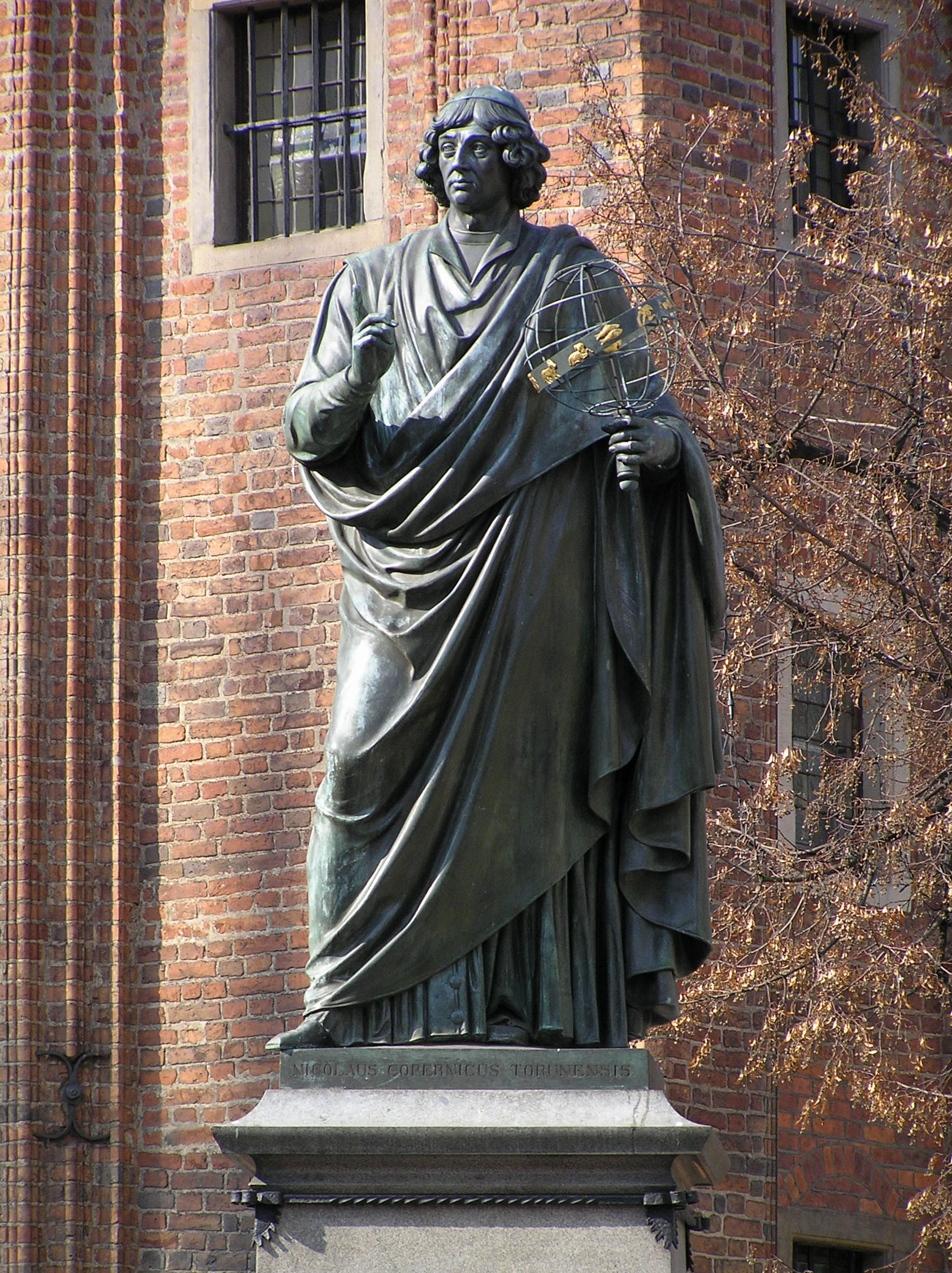

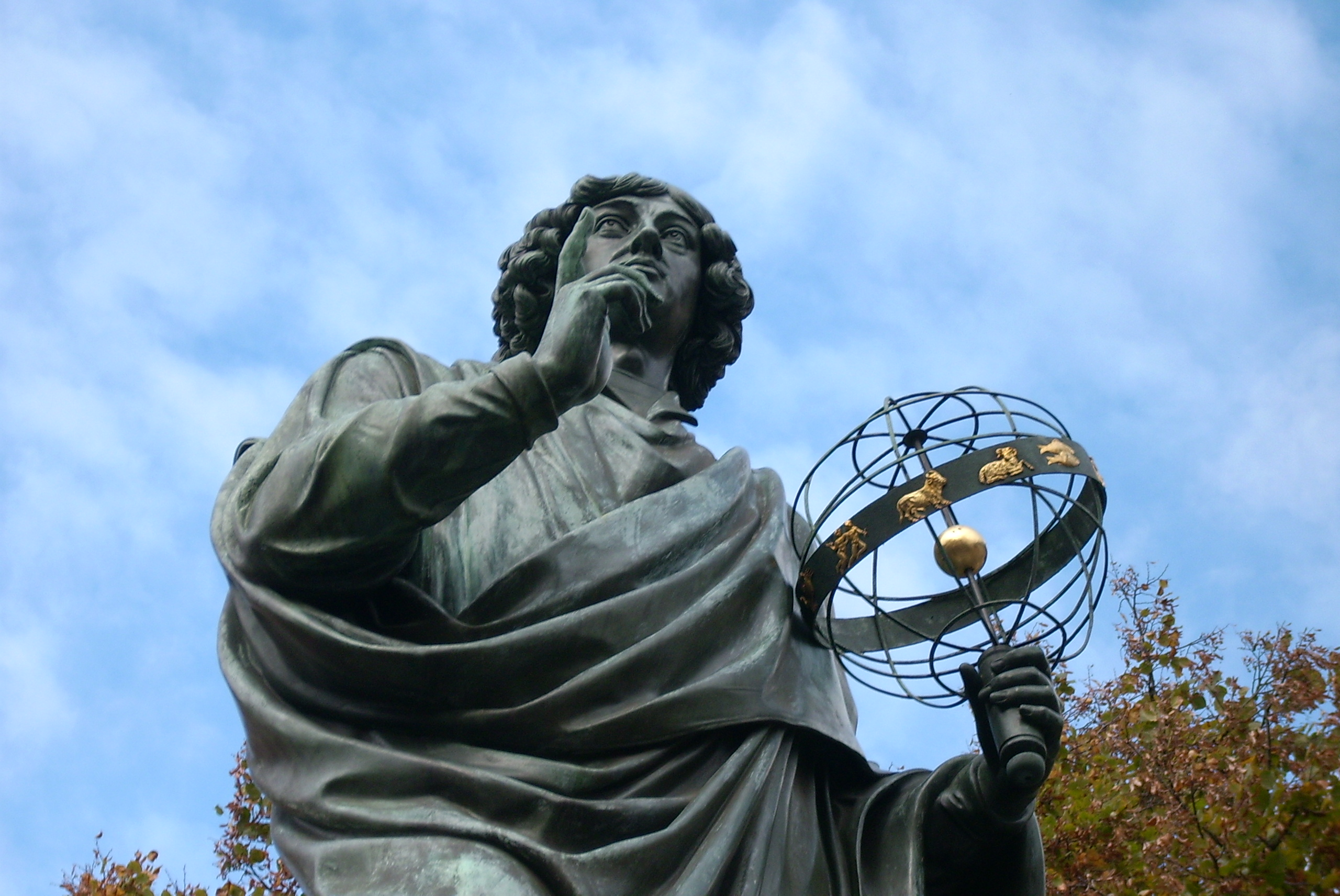
Close-up

== See also ==
- Nicolaus Copernicus Monument in Kraków
- Nicolaus Copernicus Monument in Warsaw
