= The Other Hand (album) =

- The Other Hand cover artwork

Studio album by très.b
- Released: September 21, 2010
- Recorded: 2009–2010 in Warsaw and New York
- Genre: Indie pop, alternative rock
- Length: 43:23
- Label: Pomaton EMI (PL)
- Producer: Bartłomiej Kuźniak, Victor van Vugt, Olivier Heim

Très.b chronology
Scylla and Charybdis (2007)	The Other Hand (2010)

Singles from The Other Hand
- 1. "Orange, Apple" Released: August 2010; 2. "Venus Untied" Released: December 2010; 3. "OLA" Released: May 2011

Professional ratings
Review scores
Source	Rating
Polityka	5/6 stars
Przekrój	(4/6)
Onet	(4/5)
Wprost	(favourable)
Machina	(favourable)
Gazeta Wyborcza	(favourable)
Interia	8/10 stars

The Other Hand is a major label debut album by the international indie rock band très.b. It was released on September 21, 2010 in Poland.

== Background ==
The album was recorded in Warsaw at Studio 333 and was mixed in New York City by Victor Van Vugt, who has worked with acts like: PJ Harvey, Nick Cave and Depeche Mode.

== Reception ==
The album has been very well received. It has been called a "Sensation of the fall" (Wprost), "MUST HAVE album" (Onet) and "World class album" (Machina).

== Awards ==
Year	Nominee / work	Award	Result
Fryderyk 2011	Très.B	Best Debut Album of the Year (Fonograficzny Debiut Roku)	Won

== Videos ==
A video for "Orange, Apple" was released in August, 2010, made by très.b, filmed in and around Amsterdam. Another music video for "Venus Untied" was released in December 2010.

== Track listing ==
All tracks are written by Misia Furtak, Thomas Pettit, Olivier Heim.

No.	Title	Length
1.	"Widow of Myself"	3:02
2.	"Venus Untied"	3:18
3.	"Orange, Apple"	3.43
4.	"Devourer"	2:58
5.	"What I might have lost"	4:33
6.	"Talk to me"	3:18
7.	"Yes"	3:08
8.	"What's the difference"	2:35
9.	"Resolve at midnight"	2:32
10.	"Pyhatunturi"	1:42
11.	"Temporary Residence"	3:32
12.	"The Visionary"	2:53
13.	"Wink and cough and sigh"	2:31
14.	"The Other Hand"	3:38

== Personnel ==
très.b (most of instruments recording, production, arrangement):

- Misia Furtak
- Olivier Heim
- Thomas Pettit

Other personnel

- Strings: Michał Jelonek
- Brass: Tomasz Grzegorski
- Double Bass Michał Jaros
- Rhodes and Hammond Michał "Fox" Król
- Syth and modular synth Maciek Polak
- extra rhodes Michał Wróblewski
- Hurdy gurdy Maciek "Korba" Cierliński

=== Technical personnel ===
- Bartłomiej Kuźniak (also guitar and alto saxophone on tracks 13 and 14)
- Victor van Vugt
- Olivier Heim
- Art direction - très.b and Monika Baran
- Artwork design - Misia Furtak and Monika Baran
- Artwork edit - IAMKAT
- Photography - Misia Furtak and Monika Baran
