= Nicolaus Copernicus Monument, Kraków =

Monument in Kraków, Poland

Coordinates: 50°03′40″N 19°55′58″E

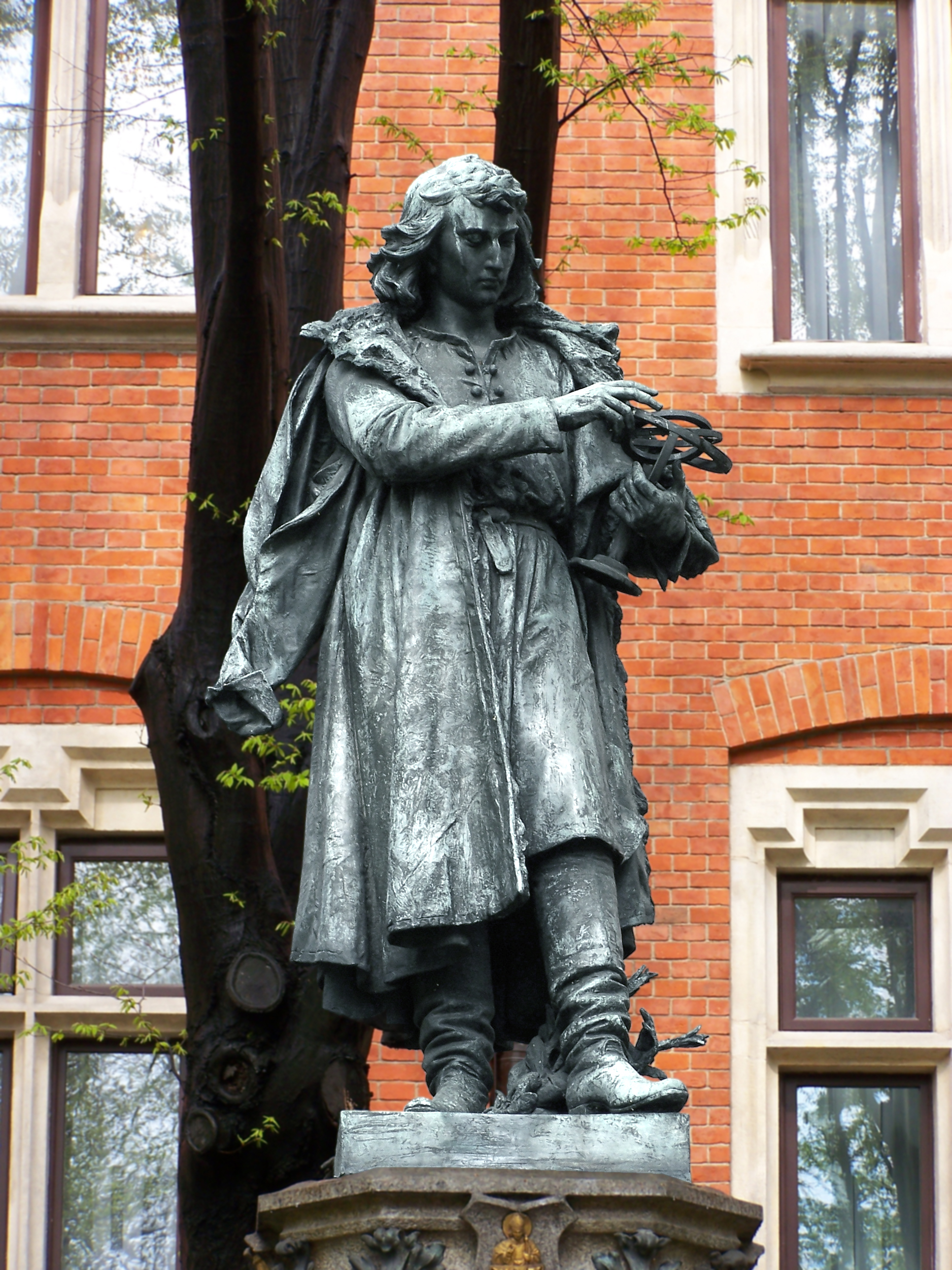
Nicolaus Copernicus Monument in Kraków

The Nicolaus Copernicus Monument in Kraków (Polish: Pomnik Mikołaja Kopernika) is a notable landmark of Kraków, Poland. It memorializes the astronomer Copernicus, who studied at the Kraków Academy and whose father came from that city, then the capital of Poland.

The statue, designed by sculptor Cyprian Godebski in 1899, was completed in 1900. It originally stood in the courtyard of the Jagiellonian University's Collegium Maius. In 1953 it was moved to Kraków's Planty Park, in front of the Collegium Witkowski building.

== See also ==
- Nicolaus Copernicus Monument in Toruń
- Nicolaus Copernicus Monument in Warsaw
