= Nicolaus Copernicus Monument (Chicago) =

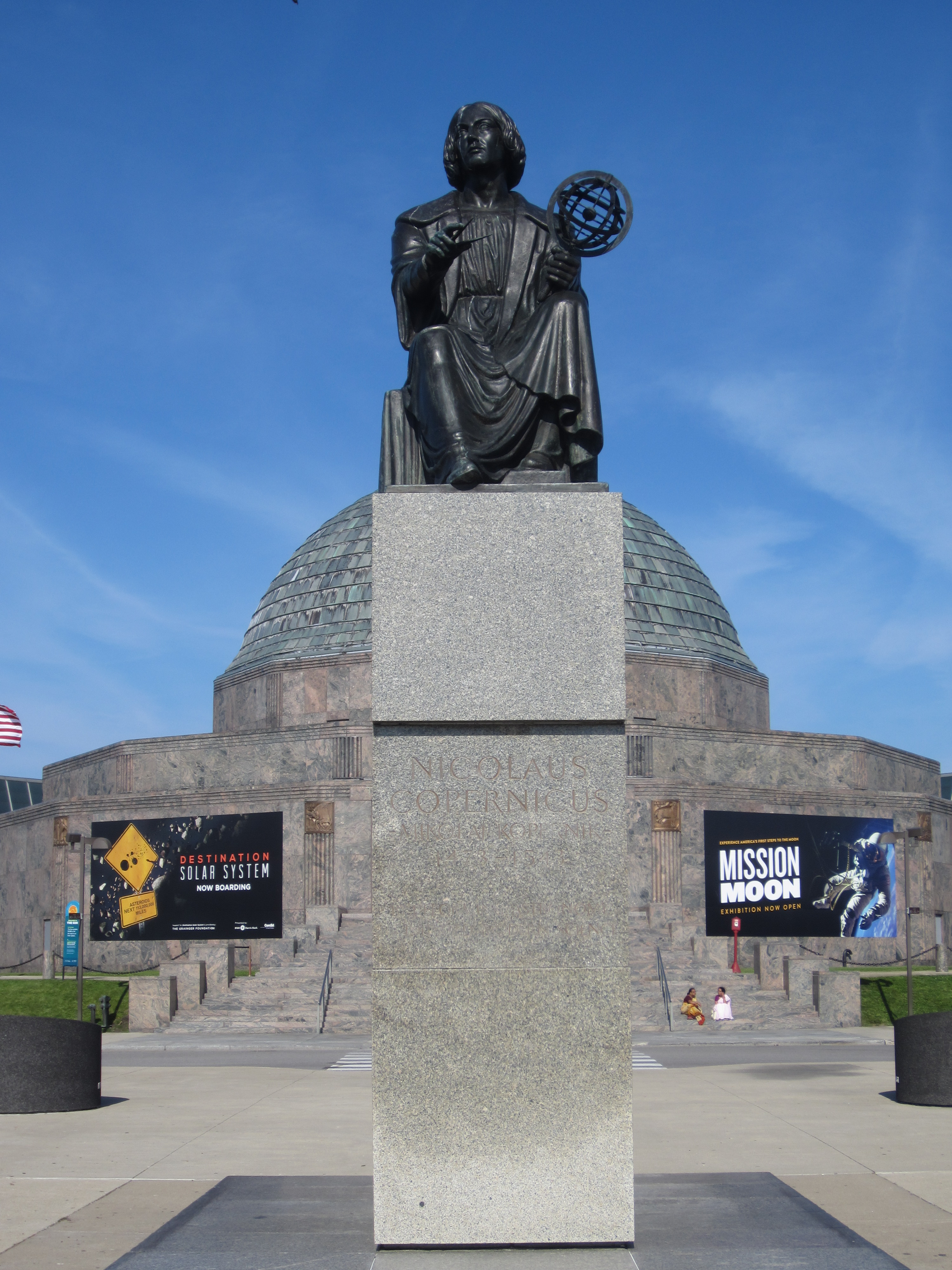
- The monument in 2015
- Location: Chicago, Illinois, United States; 41°51′58.9″N 87°36′28″W

The Nicolaus Copernicus Monument is an outdoor sculpture commemorating and depicting Nicolaus Copernicus, installed along Solidarity Drive outside Chicago's Adler Planetarium, in the U.S. state of Illinois. Bronislaw Koniuszy's replica of Bertel Thorvaldsen's original 1830 sculpture in Warsaw, Poland, was created, installed, and dedicated in 1973. Adler Planetarium erected the monument to mark the 500th anniversary of Copernicus' birth.

The Copernicus Foundation was founded in 1971 in order to raise funds for the monument, using leftover money to remodel the Gateway Theater in Jefferson Park into the Copernicus Center.

== See also ==
- 1973 in art
- Copernicus Foundation
- List of public art in Chicago
