= Olivier Heim =

Dutch songwriter and performer (born 1986)

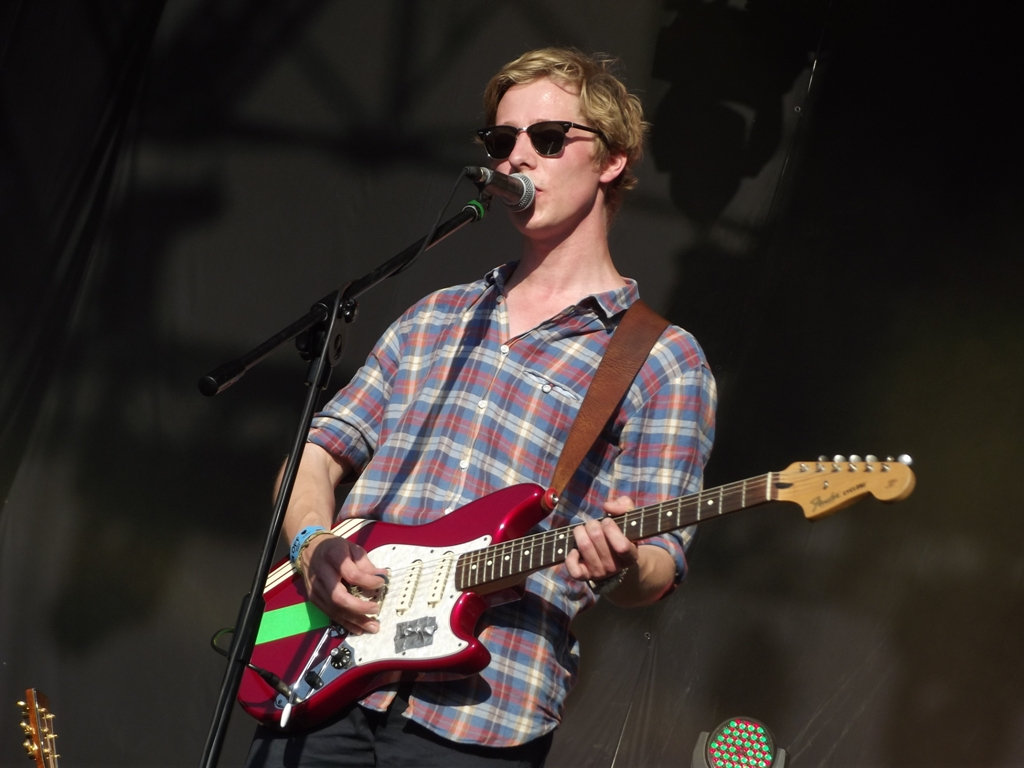
- Heim in 2013

Background information
- Born: June 27, 1986 (age 40); Chevy Chase, Maryland, U.S.
- Genres: 70s soul, Surf, Pop
- Instruments: Vocals, Guitar
- Labels: Pomaton EMI, Zozaya Records, Lado ABC

Olivier Heim (born 27 June 1986) is a Dutch songwriter and performer also known as a member of Très.b and as Anthony Chorale.

== Biography ==
Born in the US to Dutch parents and growing up in Luxembourg, Olivier spent his early years playing in various high-school bands. In 2004 he moved to Denmark where he formed the band Très.b along with Thomas Pettit and Misia Furtak.

Très.b recorded their first EP Neon Chameleon in 2006 and later their debut LP Scylla & Charybdis in 2008, recorded by Radek Krzyżanowski (KAMP!). Both records were self-released. The Other Hand (2010) was Très.b's first official release under license of Pomaton EMI in Poland. It was produced in Warsaw by Olivier Heim and Bartłomiej Kuźniak in Studio 333 and mixed in New York by Victor van Vugt (P.J. Harvey, Nick Cave, Depeche Mode). The album was awarded the Fryderyk Award for "Best Debut of the Year." Très.b's second official release 40 Winks of Courage came out in May 2012. The album's second single Let it Shine (sung by Olivier) reached nr.10 on the Lista Przebojów (top 30) on Radio Trójka. In 2013, Très.b won the highly acclaimed Paszport Polityki award in the category Pop Music. The trio disbanded as of 2014, playing their final tour in December 2013.

In 2012, Olivier released an LP entitled The Eternal Now under the stage name Anthony Chorale. The album was self-released and is available for free on Bandcamp. In 2013, Olivier released an EP entitled Ambitions of the Son. The album was released on vinyl by the music label Zozaya Records.

In 2015, Olivier released the album "A Different Life" under his own name. It was recorded, mixed and produced by Michał Kupicz in Warsaw and mastered in New York by Joe Lambert (Deerhunter, Toro Y Moi, The National). British music magazine Mojo describes it as “One of the most gorgeous, simple and effortless fresh platters in recent times” while The Sunday Times found that “this wonderful debut exudes an air of detachment”. The first single "Ocean" featured in a documentary about the painter Kazimir Malevich, running as part of the temporary exhibition at the Stedelijk Museum in Amsterdam.

Olivier Heim has performed at festivals such as: Primavera Sound Festival, Reeperbahn Festival, Liverpool Sound City, The Great Escape and Europavox. He has also played at Polish festivals such as Open'er, Off Festival, Męskie Granie, and Coke Live Music Festival. Olivier Heim has toured with acts like Wild Nothing, Porches, Frankie Cosmos, Julia Jacklin, Cullen Omori, Hazel English, Infinite Bisous, Black Peaches and Mutual Benefit.

== Discography ==
=== Albums and EPs ===
- Olivier Heim – A Different Life (2015)
- Anthony Chorale – Ambitions of the Son [EP] (2013)
- Anthony Chorale – The Eternal Now (2012)
- Très.b – 40 Winks of Courage (2012)
- Très.b – The Other Hand (2010)
- Très.b – Scylla and Charybdys (2007)
- Très.b – Neon Chameleon EP (2006)

=== Singles ===
- Très.b – Ola single (2008)

== Videography ==
- Olivier Heim – Far Apart (by J. Szewczyk) (2016)
- Olivier Heim – Ocean (by K. Pacura, J. Szewczyk) (2014)
- Très.b – Let it Shine (by Lava Films) (2012)
- Très.b – Like Is (by ImagePro.pl) (2012)
- Très.b – Venus Untied (directed by DDBC Creative Design) (2010)
- Très.b – Orange, Apple (made by très.b) (2012)
- Très.b – Ola (directed by Film en Zoonen) (2008)

== Awards ==
Year	Nominee / work	Award	Result
2011	Très.b	Fryderyk – Best Debut Album of the Year (Fonograficzny Debiut Roku)	Won
2012	Très.b	Paszport Polityki – Pop music (Muzyka Popularna)	Won

=== Charts ===
Year	Artist/Title	Position
Year	Artist/Title	LP3
2012	Tres.b – Let it shine	10
