= Erin Marie Furtak =

American scholar of science education

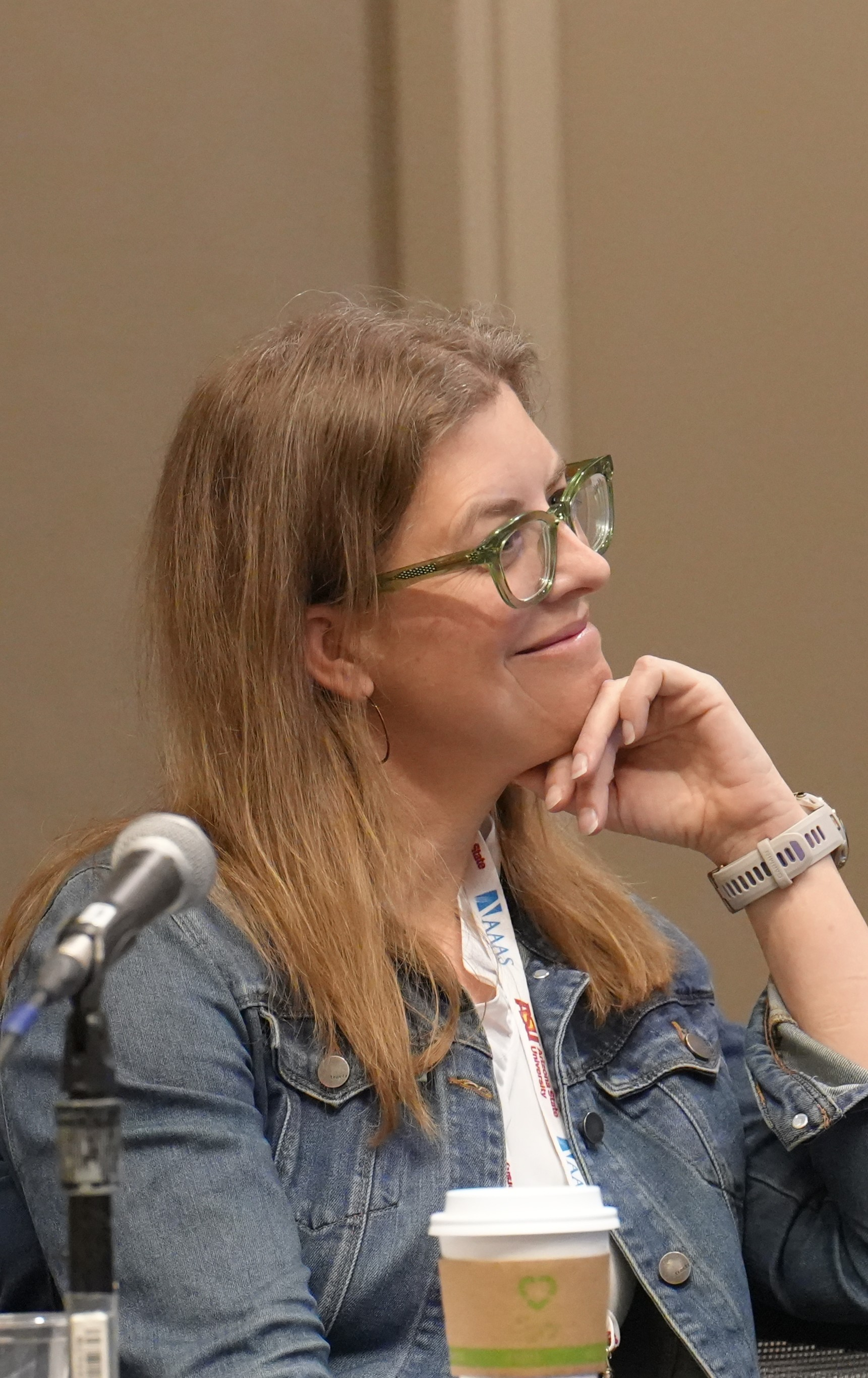
- Furtak in 2026
- Education: University of Denver; Stanford University
- Awards: Presidential Early Career Award for Scientists and Engineers in 2011
- Scientific career
- Workplaces: University of Colorado Boulder

Erin Marie Furtak is an American scholar of science education and a professor in the School of Education at the University of Colorado Boulder. Her research has focused on inquiry-based learning and formative assessment in science education.

== Education and career ==
Furtak was an undergraduate at the University of Colorado Boulder, where she majored in biological sciences, graduating in 1999. She received a 2001 master's degree in education from the University of Denver, while working from 2000 to 2002 as a high school science teacher in Colorado. Next, she continued her studies in science education at Stanford University. She completed her Ph.D. there in 2006. Her dissertation, The dilemma of guidance in scientific inquiry teaching, was supervised by Richard Shavelson.

After postdoctoral research at the Max Planck Institute for Educational Research in Berlin, Germany, Furtak returned to the University of Colorado Boulder as an assistant professor in the School of Education in 2008. She was promoted to associate professor in 2013 and full professor in 2018.

== Recognition ==
Furtak received a 2011 Presidential Early Career Award for Scientists and Engineers, given "for innovative research on how professional development focused on learning progressions increases teacher knowledge and student achievement, and for working with schools and teachers to implement such professional development in diverse settings".
