= Misia Sert =

Art patron (1872–1950)

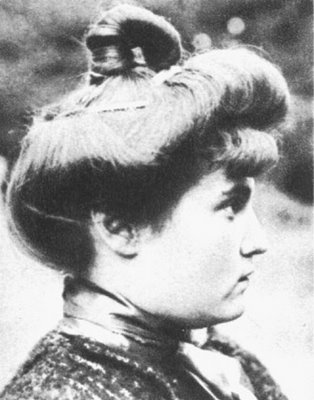
- Born: Maria Zofia Olga Zenajda Godebska; 30 March 1872; Tsarskoye Selo, Russian Empire
- Died: 15 October 1950 (aged 78); Paris, France
- Resting place: Samoreau
- Other names: Misia Natanson, Misia Edwards
- Occupations: Pianist, patron of the arts
- Father: Cyprian Godebski
- Relatives: Adrien-François Servais (maternal grandfather)

Misia Sert (born Maria Zofia Olga Zenajda Godebska; 30 March 1872 – 15 October 1950) was known primarily as a patron of contemporary artists and musicians during the decades she hosted salons in her homes in Paris. Born in the Russian Empire and of Belgian, French and Polish descent, she became a professional pianist and gave her first public concert in 1892. She was a patron and friend of numerous artists, for whom she regularly posed, appearing on magazine covers and posters. Her salons were frequented by contemporary writers and musicians played their newest works.

In addition, Sert made creative and financial contributions to Sergei Diaghilev, impresario of the Ballets Russes. He consulted closely with her on elements of this innovative dance company, ranging from costume design to choreography.

== Early life ==
Maria Zofia Olga Zenajda Godebska, known as Misia, was born on 30 March 1872 in Tsarskoye Selo, a town known as the Tsar's village, 13 miles outside Saint Petersburg, Russian Empire. Her father, Cyprian Godebski (1835-1909), was a renowned Polish sculptor and professor at the Imperial Academy of Arts in St. Petersburg and had ties to the aristocracy. Her mother, Eugénie Sophie Léopoldine Servais (called Zofia in Polish), of French-Belgian descent, was the daughter of noted Belgian cellist, Adrien-François Servais and his wife.

Zofia Godebska knew that her husband engaged in extra-marital affairs. While pregnant, she traveled from St. Petersburg to Tsarskoye Selo, where she surprised Godebski, who was working there temporarily on a court project and living with his current mistress. Zofia died soon after giving birth to her daughter, thereafter called Misia, the Polish diminutive of Maria. Godebski sent the infant girl to be cared for by his wife's Servais family at Halle, Belgium, near Brussels.

It was a musical household and the family held concerts performed by noted musicians. Two of the Servais sons had followed their father into musical careers. Pianist and composer Franz Liszt was among friends of the family. The young Misia Godebska received her early musical education there and was acknowledged as gifted. Although her cellist grandfather Servais had died in 1866, several years before Misia was born, others in the family circle taught her to read music as a young child and encouraged her to develop her gifts as a pianist.

Godebska's father remarried several times, ultimately reclaiming his daughter and bringing her to live with him and his newest wife in Paris. The girl missed the ambiance of her maternal grandparents’ home in Halle. Her father placed her in a convent boarding school in the city, Sacré-Coeur, where she was a student for eight years, 1882-1890. Her only pleasure was the piano lessons she took one day a week from musician and composer Gabriel Fauré, who was then deputy organist at Église de la Madeleine. Godebska left school and moved to London temporarily, using borrowed funds. After several months, she returned to Paris, where she took her own lodgings and supported herself by teaching piano to students referred by Fauré. She gave her first public concert in 1892, at the age of 20.

== Marriages and social milieu ==
Portraits of Misia Sert

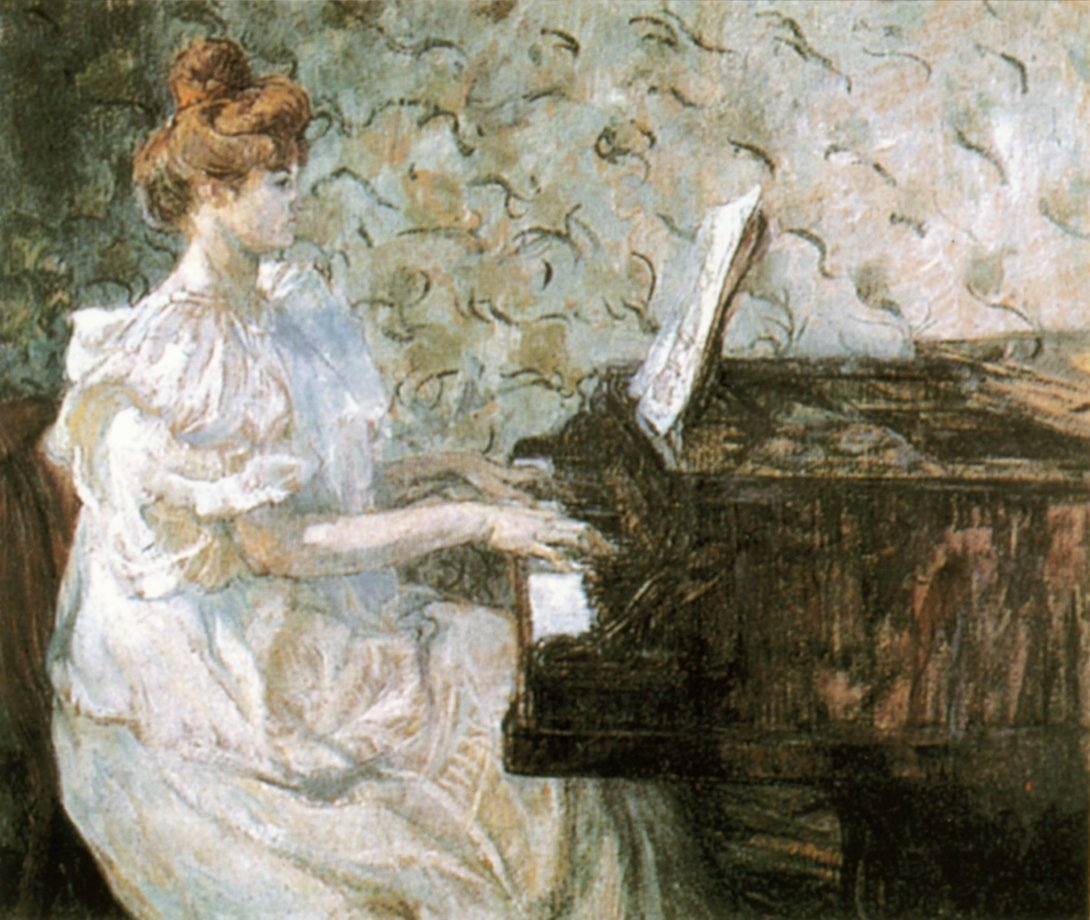
Misia by Henri de Toulouse-Lautrec, 1897

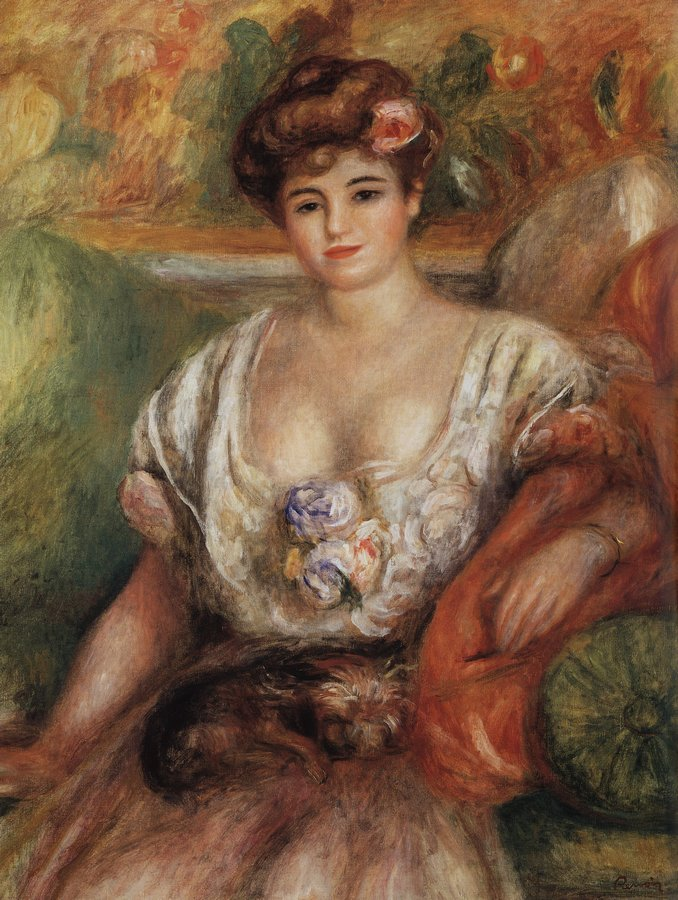
Misia Sert, by Pierre-Auguste Renoir, c. 1906

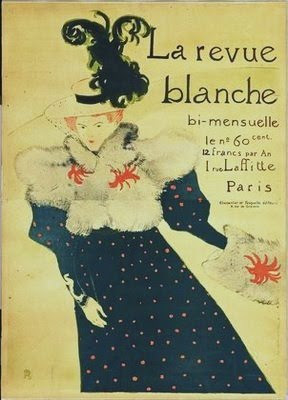
Sert portrayed on the cover of La revue blanche, 1872, by Toulouse-Lautrec

At age 21, Sert married her twenty-year-old cousin Thadée (Tadeusz) Natanson, a Polish émigré and member of a banking family. Natanson frequented the haunts favored by the artistic and intellectual circles of Paris. He became involved in political causes, championing the ideals of socialism, which he shared with his friend Léon Blum. He was a Dreyfusard. The Natanson home on the Rue St. Florentine became a gathering place for such cultural lights as writer Marcel Proust, artists Claude Monet, Pierre-Auguste Renoir, Odilon Redon, and Paul Signac, composer Claude Debussy, poet Stéphane Mallarmé, and playwright André Gide. The entertainment was lavish. Henri de Toulouse-Lautrec enjoyed playing bartender at the Natanson parties, and became known for serving a potent cocktail— a drink of colorful layered liqueurs dubbed the Pousse-Café.

All were mesmerized by the charm and youth of their hostess Misia. In 1889, Natanson debuted La Revue Blanche, a periodical committed to nurturing new talent and showcasing the work of post-Impressionists known as Les Nabis. Misia Natanson became the muse and symbol of La Revue blanche, appearing in advertising posters created by Toulouse-Lautrec, Édouard Vuillard and Pierre Bonnard. A portrait of her by Renoir is now in the National Gallery, London.

Natanson’s La Revue blanche, coupled with his political activism, required an influx of capital in amounts he could not supply. Needing a benefactor, he approached Alfred Edwards, a newspaper magnate, the founder of the foremost newspaper in Paris, Le Matin. Edwards had become enamored with Misia Natanson and had taken her as his mistress in 1903. He said he would supply money, but only on the condition that Natanson relinquish his wife to him. The couple divorced.

On 24 February 1905, Misia (Godebska) Natanson married Alfred Edwards. She and her new husband took up an opulent lifestyle in their apartment on Rue de Rivoli of the Right Bank, overlooking the Tuileries Palace. Here, Misia Edwards continued welcoming artists, writers, and musicians in her home. Maurice Ravel dedicated Le Cygne (The Swan) in "Histoires naturelles" and La Valse (The Waltz) to her. Edwards accompanied Enrico Caruso on the piano while the Italian opera star entertained the assembled listeners with a repertory of Neapolitan songs. After Alfred Edwards proved unfaithful and took up with actress Genevieve Lantelme, Misia divorced him in February 1909.

Among the many guests at her salon who were enchanted with Misia, writer Marcel Proust used her as the prototype for the characters "Princess Yourbeletieff" and "Madame Verdurin" in his roman à clef À la recherche du temps perdu (Remembrance of Things Past) (1913). At an evening in 1914 her guests listened to Erik Satie at the piano playing his new work Trois morceaux en forme de poire. That night they learned that the Great War had begun.

In 1920, after some time with Catalan painter José-Maria Sert, Misia Edwards married him. Given his success as an artist, this period began her reign and fame as Misia Sert, cultural patron and arbiter, which lasted more than thirty years. Writer Paul Morand described her as a "collector of geniuses, all of them in love with her." It was acknowledged that "you had to be gifted before Misia wanted to know you."

The Sert marriage was emotionally tumultuous. Her husband became involved with Princess Isabelle Roussadana Mdivani, known as "Roussy", who belonged to the aristocratic Russian Mdivani family. Given her own varied experiences, Sert tried to accommodate herself to this liaison and also entered into a sexual relationship with Roussy. For some time the three sustained a ménage à trois. The Sert couple ultimately divorced on 28 December 1927.

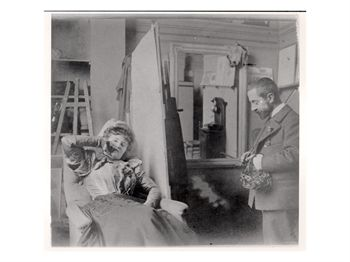
Sert and Toulouse-Lautrec in the artist's studio

The Serts’ social set included bohemian elites and the upper levels of society. It was a libertine group, rife with emotional and sexual intrigues—all fueled by drug use and abuse. Misia Sert had an enduring association with couturière Coco Chanel, whom she had met in 1917 at the home of actress Cécile Sorel. Sert later provided Chanel with emotional support, after the designer's lover, Arthur Capel, died on 22 December 1919 in an automobile accident. The two women were said to have had an immediate bond of like souls, and Sert was attracted to Chanel by "her genius, lethal wit, sarcasm and maniacal destructiveness, which intrigued and appalled everyone." Both women were convent educated; their friendship was one of shared interests, confidences and drug use.

Sert was generous and supportive to friends in need. For instance, she provided financial assistance to poet Pierre Reverdy when he needed funds to retreat to a Benedictine monastery in Solesmes.

She had a long friendship and business association with Russian impresario Sergei Diaghilev and was involved in all creative aspects of the Ballets Russes - from friendships with its dancers, to contributing to decisions on costume designs and choreography. Through the years she supplied funds for the ballet company; while its artistic achievements were recognized, it was often on risky financial footing. For instance, on the opening night of the new work Petroushka, composed by Igor Stravinsky, she came to the rescue with the 4000 francs needed to prevent repossession of the costumes. When Diaghilev lay dying in Venice, she was at his side. After his death in August 1929, she paid for his funeral, honoring the man who had been such an important influence in the world of ballet.

During World War II and the Nazi occupation of Paris, Sert evaded serious condemnation for supporting the arts and some of the circle which German officials considered suspect. Others of her social set were more overtly allied with the Nazis and the Vichy government. Among the refugee intellectuals and artists, a number joined the Resistance.

== Death ==
Misia Sert died in Paris on 15 October 1950. After a ceremony at Notre-Dame-de-l'Assomption, the Polish church of Paris where Coco Chanel had prepared Sert's body for the funeral, she was buried in the cemetery of Samoreau.

== Legacy and honors ==
Sert is the subject of a musical, Misia, with lyrics by Barry Singer and set to the music of Vernon Duke. Singer wrote the first draft in 2001. It was released as a cast album by PS Classics in 2015. Interest in the work was shown by Broadway producers, but it has not yet been produced on the stage.

The South-West Brabant Museum in Halle, her parents' home, has a collection on her life, as well as that of her maternal grandfather and father.

On 9 July 2022 a new bridge was opened in Halle that was named for her.

== Notes ==
=== References ===
- Vaughan, Hal (2011). Sleeping with the enemy: Coco Chanel's secret war. New York: Alfred A. Knopf. ISBN 9780307592637.
- Charles-Roux, Edmonde (1981). Chanel and Her World. London: Vendome Press. ISBN 9780865650114.
