= Misia Ff =

Misia Furtak
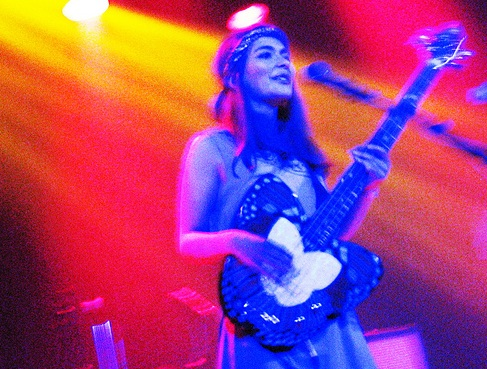
- Misia Furtak performing in 2009

Background information
- Also known as: Misia Ff
- Born: Michalina Aleksandra Furtak; 12 de septiembre de 1982 (41 años)
- Genres: Indie pop, rock
- Instruments: Vocals, bass guitar, piano
- Years active: 2005–present
- Labels: Pomaton EMI, Chaos Group
- Website: www.tres-b.com

Michalina Aleksandra Furtak (earlier active as Misia Ff) is a Polish singer, bassist and journalist known as a member of the indie rock group Très.b, active between 2005 and 2014.

== Biography ==
Furtak was born on 12 September 1982 in Zielona Góra. She is of Lemko origin. As a child, Misia Furtak studied violin, piano, and flute. She moved to Denmark and studied at Testrup Højskole where she met her bandmates Thomas Pettit and Olivier Heim. They first lived in Copenhagen, where they shared a room, and later moved to Maastricht and Amsterdam. Misia studied a Master's Programme Media Culture at Maastricht University.

After having lived in the Netherlands and Denmark, Furtak returned to Poland where in June 2010, her and Très.b signed to Pomaton EMI and their debut called The Other Hand was released 21 September 2010. The album was recorded in Warsaw at Studio 333 and was mixed in New York City by Victor Van Vugt, who has worked with acts like PJ Harvey, Nick Cave and Depeche Mode. It was well received, and in May 2011 the band was awarded a Fryderyk for Best Debut Album of the Year.

In December 2011, it was announced that the band was ready to record a new album and finance it through crowdfunding. In February 2012, the band recorded with Michał Kupicz (Indigo Tree, Enchanted Hunters). They recorded everything live, so the whole recording process only took 6 days.

The band used unusual ideas to promote the release, e.g. the title was announced in a set of riddles and the first single, before the official radio premiere, was streamed by a local espresso bar where fans could hear it with a set of headphones attached to the wall, after they received gps coordinates to find the location.

The album 40 Winks of Courage was released 15 May 2012 and received complimentary reviews. In January 2013 the album was awarded with the prestigious Paszport Polityki.

Misia (Ff) Furtak is also known for her cooperation with a Polish band Dr.No, with the most recent release being a single called "Disarray". This track will be featured on the upcoming Polskie Radio Program III compilation Offensywa vol.4. Their earlier recording was a tribute to Polish poet Stanisław Wyspiański and was featured on a special compilation released by Polish Radio.

She released a digital only EP 40 Winks, on streaming platforms.

She has also made appearances on albums by Lucky Fonz III, Envotion, and Bajzel. Furtak was also a member of the trip-hop band called Glorybox. in the period 2002–2003.

She recently recorded a track with Maciej Werk for his new album Songs That Make Sense featuring a.o Mark Lanegan, Chris Olley or Poogie Bell. Their duet "Summer of love", is the first single promoting the album.

Her list of favourite/inspiring songs, prepared for a radio interview in January 2011 included works by Bob Dylan, David Bowie, The Smiths, Lou Reed and John Cale, PJ Harvey, Radiohead, The National and Local Natives.

Elle Magazine (October 2012 issue) listed her amongst "the 12 most promising talents of 2012"

In October 2013 she released her first EP as Misia Ff.

She holds a master's degree in media culture from Maastricht University and works with the Polish public radio channel RDC.

She plays a shortscale bass guitar in the shape of a monarch butterfly.

== Awards ==
Year	Nominee / work	Award	Result
2011	The Other Hand	Fryderyk; Best Debut Album of the Year (Fonograficzny Debiut Roku)	Won
2012	Très.B	Paszport Polityki, Muzyka Popularna	Won

=== Charts ===
Year	Title	Position
Year	Title	LP3
2012	Like Is	not listed
2012	Let it shine	10
