= Nicolaus Copernicus Monument, Warsaw =

Monument in Warsaw, Poland

Nicolaus Copernicus Monument
- Pomnik Mikołaja Kopernika w Warszawie
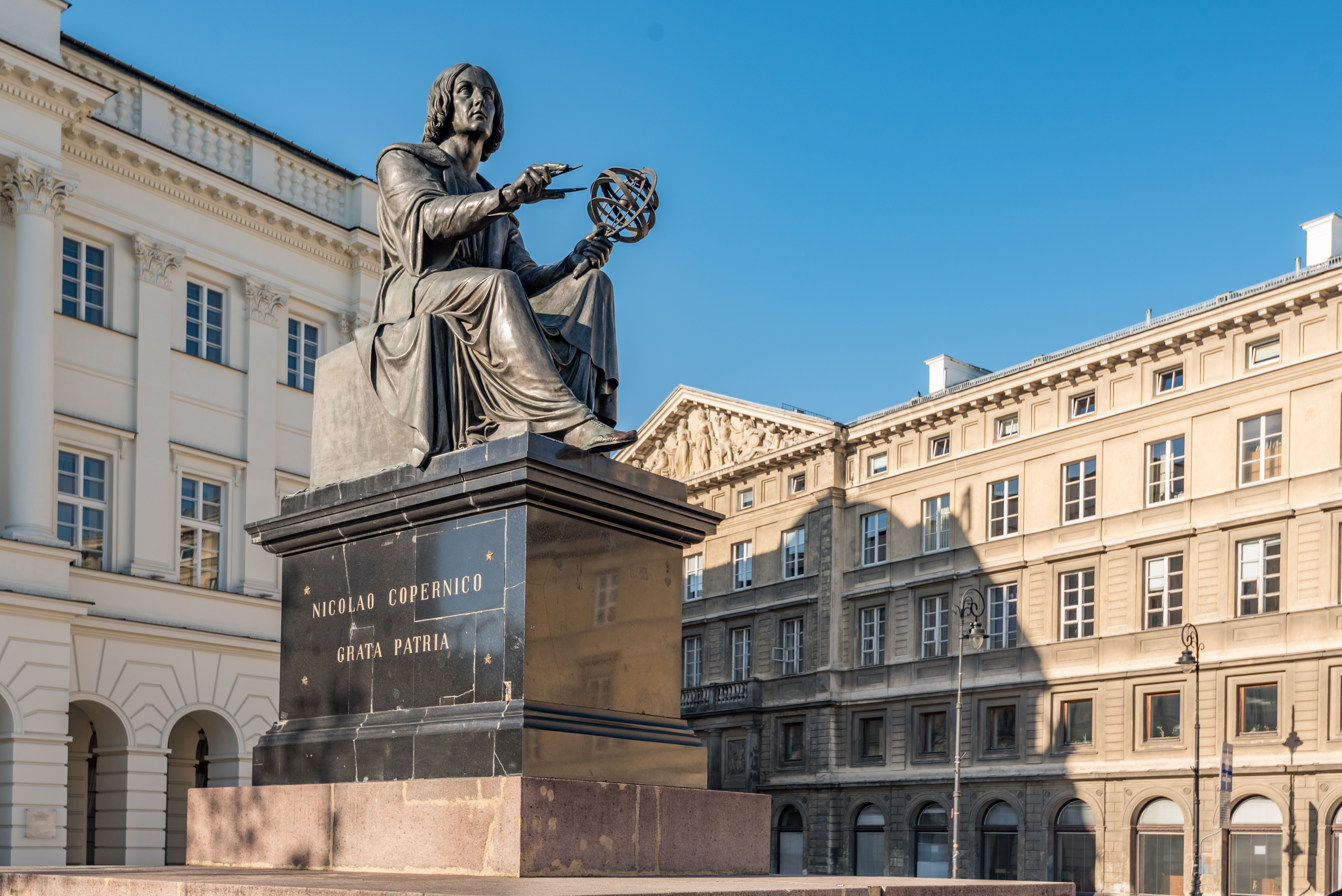
- Thorvaldsen's Copernicus Monument in front the Polish Academy of Sciences on Warsaw's Krakowskie Przedmieście
- Interactive map of Nicolaus Copernicus Monument
- Location: Warsaw, Poland
- Coordinates: 52°14′17″N 21°01′05″E
- Designer: Bertel Thorvaldsen
- Material: Bronze
- Beginning date: 1828
- Completion date: 1830
- Dedicated to: Nicolaus Copernicus

Historic Monument of Poland
- Designated: 1994-09-08
- Part of: Warsaw – historic city center with the Royal Route and Wilanów
- Reference no.: M.P. 1994 nr 50 poz. 423

The Nicolaus Copernicus Monument in Warsaw is one of the Polish capital's notable landmarks. It stands before the Staszic Palace, the seat of the Polish Academy of Sciences on Krakowskie Przedmieście. Designed by Bertel Thorvaldsen in 1822, the monument was completed in 1830. Thorvaldsen's original plaster model from 1822 and a smaller study from 1821 are held by the Thorvaldsen Museum in Copenhagen.

== Description ==
The monument features a bronze statue of Renaissance astronomer Nicolaus Copernicus (Polish: Mikołaj Kopernik) holding a compass and armillary sphere.

== History ==
The monument was designed by Bertel Thorvaldsen in 1822 and erected in 1828–1830. It was funded by public donations and by the scientist and philosopher Stanisław Staszic. The unveiling ceremony, presided over by Tadeusz Kościuszko's former comrade-in-arms, Julian Ursyn Niemcewicz. Polish clergy refused to attend the ceremonies as his book had been condemned by the Holy Office in 1616. The ban was lifted in 1758 during the pontificate of Pope Benedict XIV (see Index 1758).

Staszic had originally planned to erect the statue in Toruń, Copernicus' hometown, upon hearing that Napoleon had expressed surprise during an 1807 visit to Toruń that there was no monument to Copernicus in the town. The fall of the Duchy of Warsaw (which had included Toruń) and the reoccupation of the region by Prussia had delayed the project and eventually forced Staszic to change the venue to Warsaw, which was in the Russian partition.

The east face of the pedestal bears the inscription, "Nicolo Copernico Grata Patria" (Latin: "To Nicolaus Copernicus [from a] Grateful Nation"), and the west face—"Mikołajowi Kopernikowi Rodacy" (Polish: "To Mikołaj Kopernik [from his] compatriots").

During World War II, the Copernicus monument was the focus of a notable "minor-sabotage" operation by the Polish underground. Soon after the Nazi German occupation of Warsaw in 1939, the Germans effaced the Latin and Polish inscriptions and attached a plaque in German language: "To Nicolaus Copernicus [from] the German Nation". On 11 February 1942 Maciej Aleksy Dawidowski removed the German plaque. In response, on 21 February, the Germans moved Warsaw's statue of Jan Kiliński to the National Museum in Warsaw. Dawidowski and his comrades retaliated by placing a large graffito on the Museum ("People of Warsaw—I am here. Jan Kiliński") and on 13 March adding a new plaque to the Copernicus monument: "For removal of the Kiliński statue, I am extending the winter by two months. Kopernik."

In 1944, after the Warsaw Uprising, in which the monument was damaged, the Germans decided to melt it down. They removed it to Nysa, but had to retreat before they could melt it down. The Poles brought the monument back to Warsaw on 22 July 1945, renovated it, and unveiled it again on 22 July 1949.

In 2007 a bronze representation of Copernicus' Solar System, modelled after an image in his De revolutionibus orbium coelestium, was placed on the square in front of the monument. In July 2008 the statue was vandalized, but the stolen parts were soon recovered.

Replicas of Warsaw's Copernicus monument stand in Montreal and Chicago.

== Plaster models in the Thorvaldsen Museum ==
A 47 cm tall plaster model from 1821 (A858) and the original plaster model from 1822 (A113) are both in the collection of the Thorvaldsen Museum in Copenhagen.

== Gallery ==
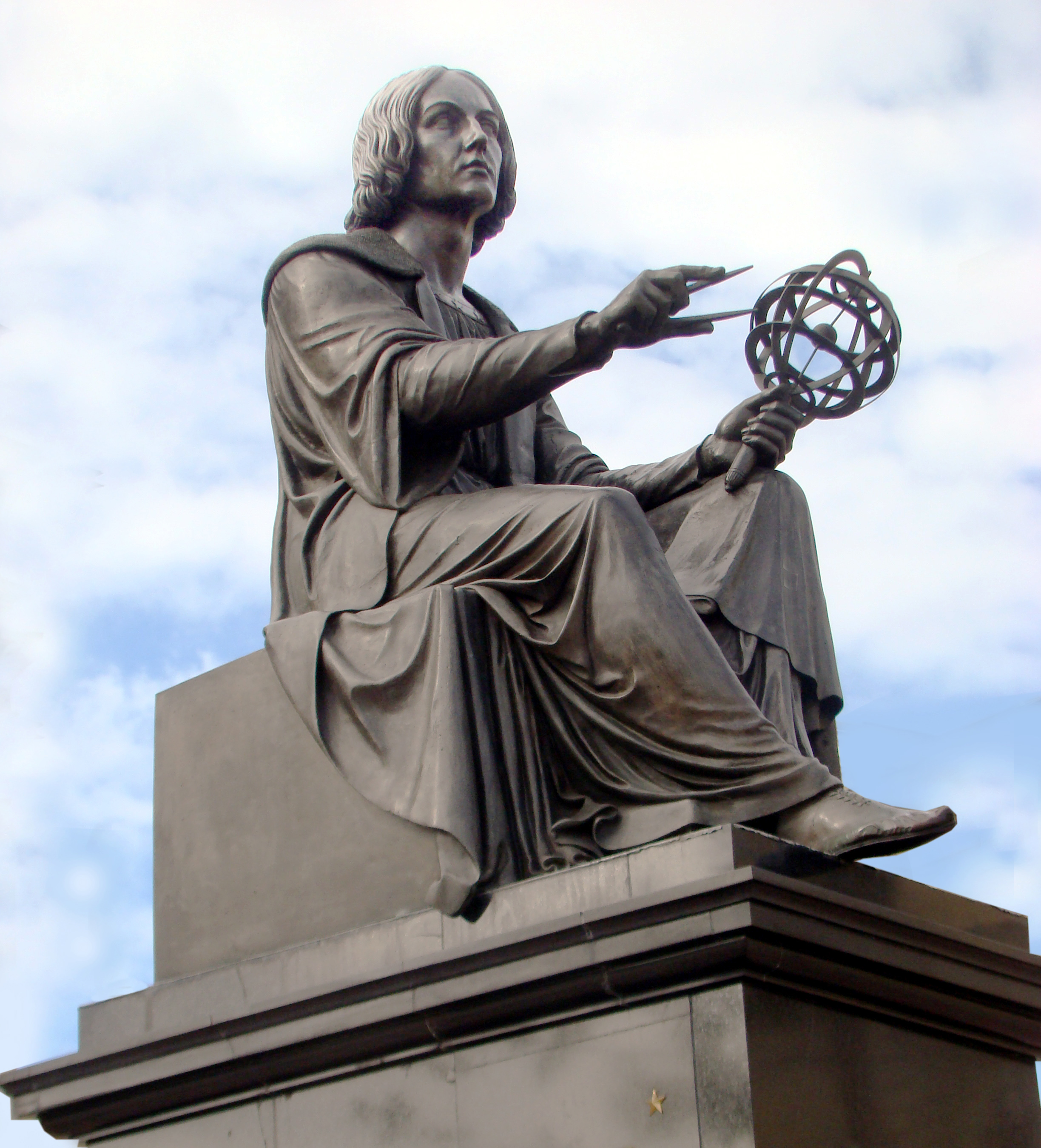
Copernicus holds a compass and armillary sphere.

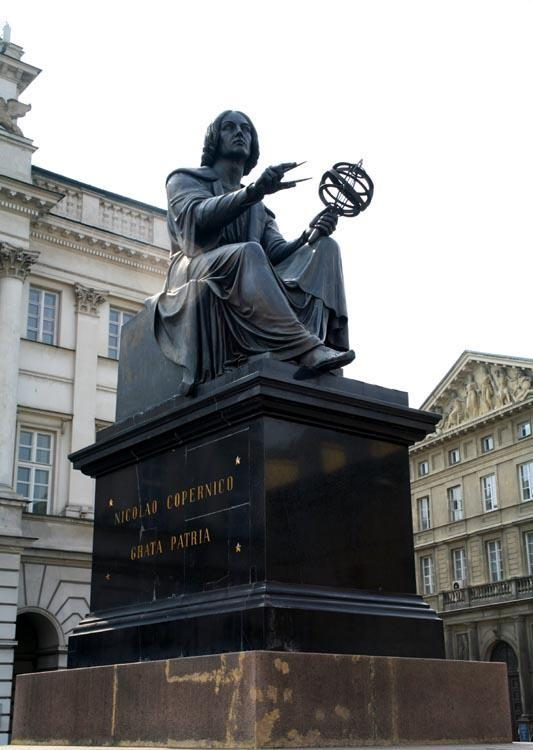
Latin inscription on east face of pedestal: "To Nicolaus Copernicus [from a] Grateful Nation".

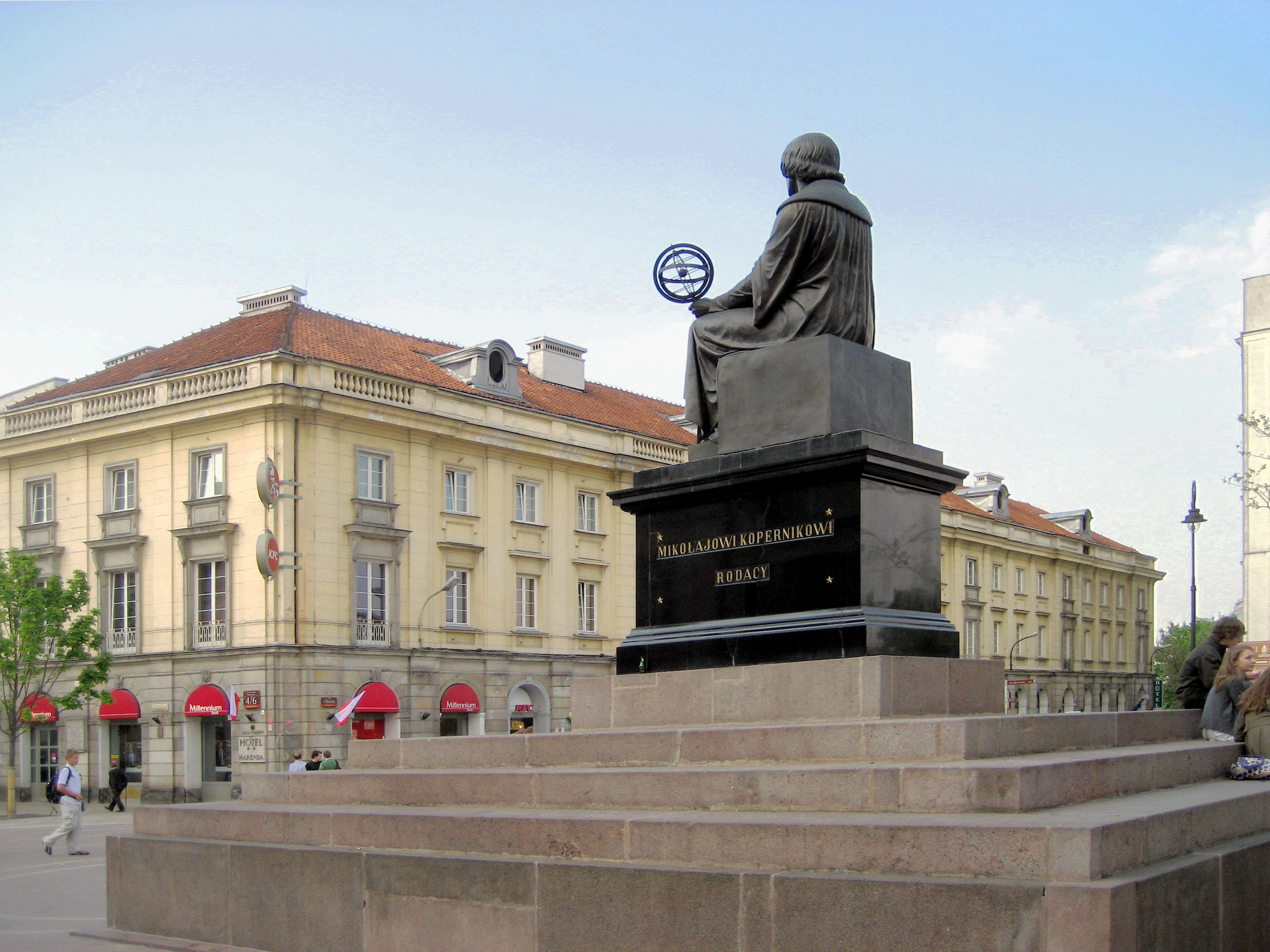
Inscription in Polish on west face of pedestal: "To Mikołaj Kopernik [from his] compatriots".

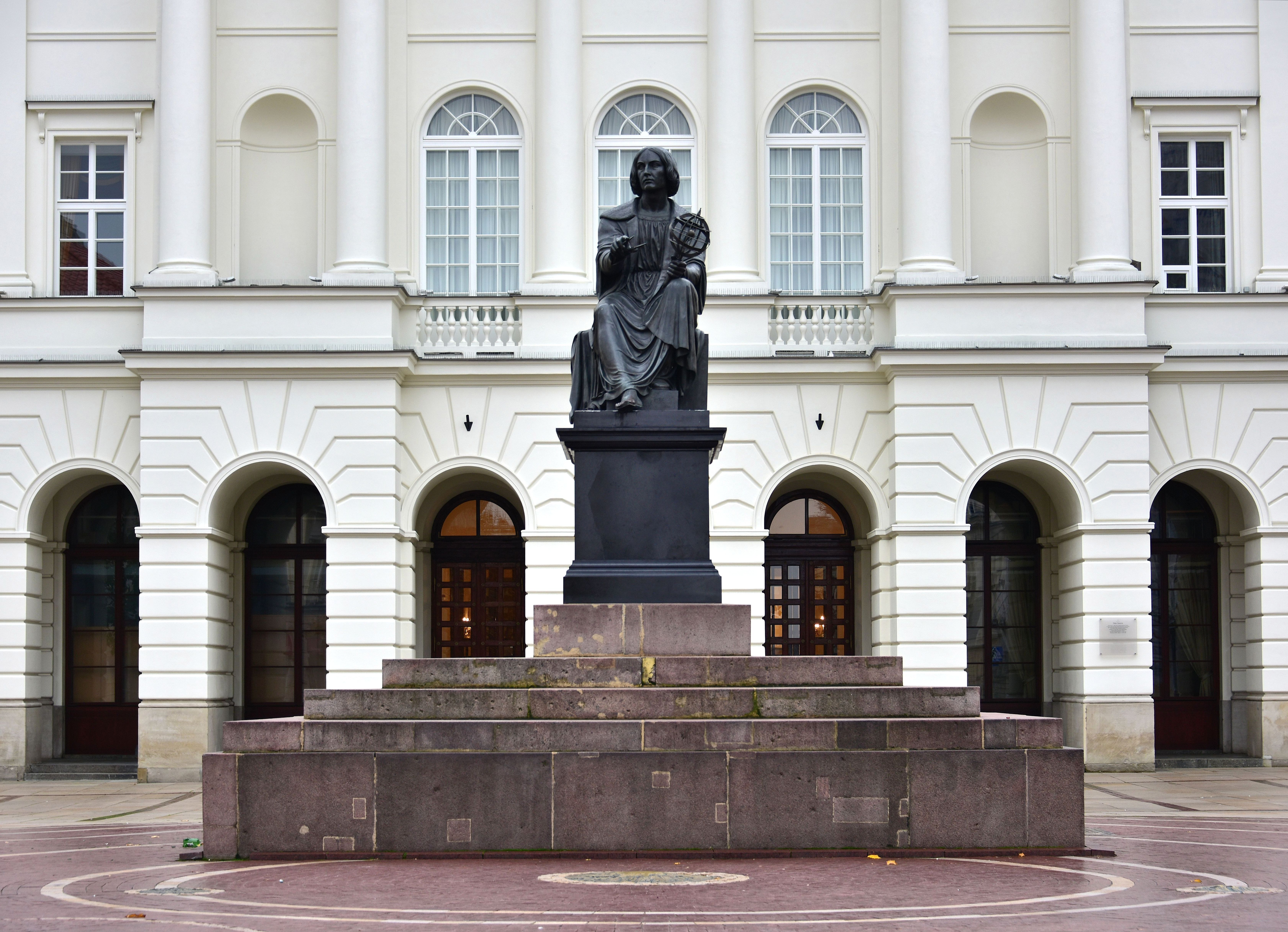
Front view with the Staszic Palace in the background.

== See also ==
- Siege of Allenstein
