= Kingdom of the French (1791–92) =

Constitutional monarchy under Louis XVI

Coordinates: 48.8049°N 2.1203°E

Kingdom of the French Royaume des Français
- 1791–1792
- Flag State coat of arms
- Motto: La Nation, la Loi, le Roi "The Nation, the Law, the King"
- Anthem: Marche Henri IV (1590–1830) "March of Henry IV"
- Kingdom of France in September 1791 – September 1792
- Capital: Paris
- Common languages: French
- Religion: Constitutional
- Demonym: French
- Government: Constitutional monarchy
  - King: Louis XVI
- Legislature: Legislative Assembly
- History
  - Flight to Varennes: 20–21 June 1791
  - Constitution adopted: 3 September 1791
  - Storming of the Tuileries: 10 August 1792
  - Republic proclaimed: 21 September 1792
- Currency: Assignat
Preceded by	Succeeded by
Kingdom of France	French First Republic

Constitutional Cabinet of Louis XVI
- Cabinet of Kingdom of France

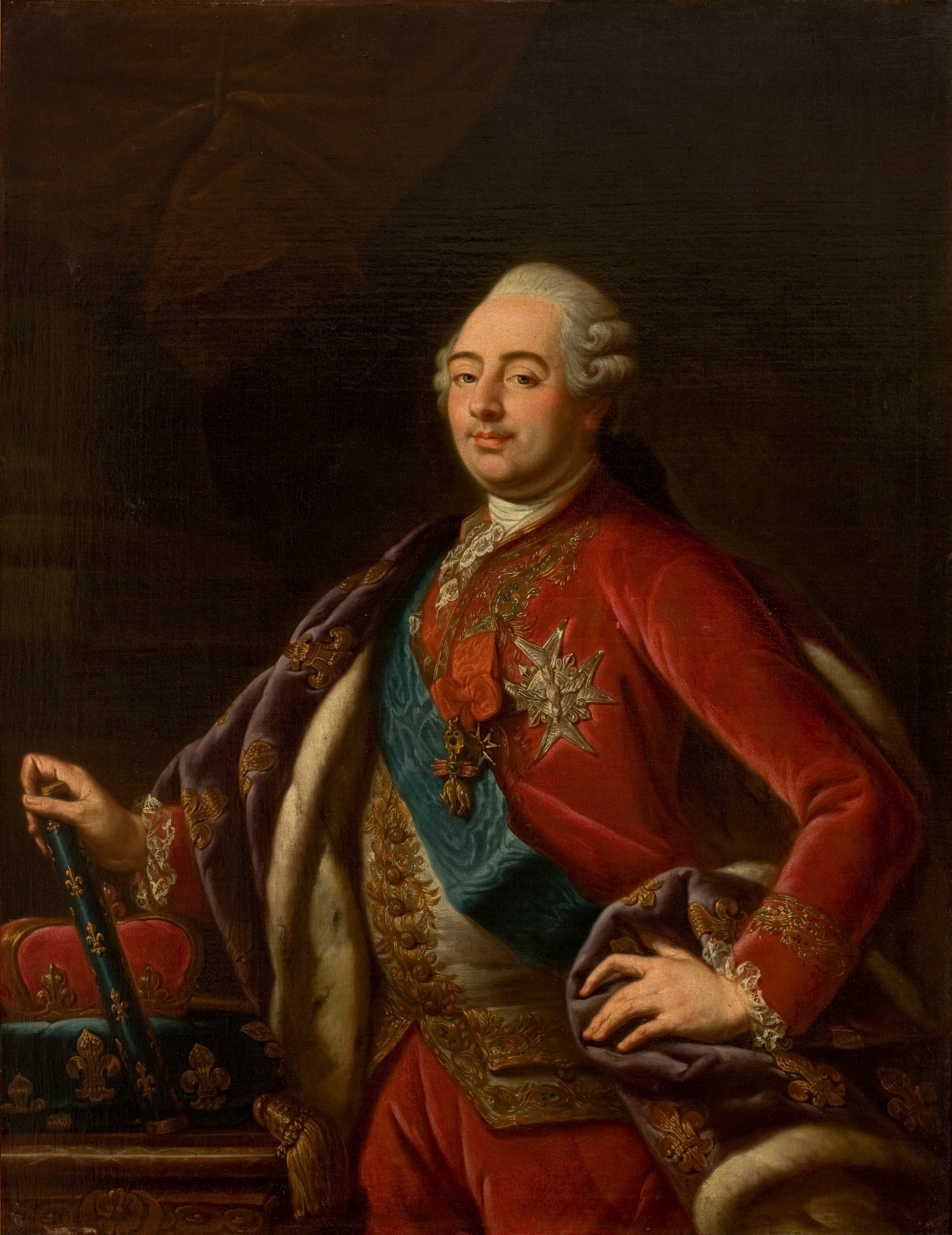
- Date formed: 3 September 1791
- Date dissolved: 21 September 1792

People and organisations
- Head of state: King Louis XVI
- No. of ministers: 5
- Ministers removed: 19
- Total no. of members: 24
- Member party: Independents, Feuillants, Moderate Jacobins (1792)
- Status in legislature: Legislative Assembly
- Opposition party: Jacobins
- Opposition leader: Georges Couthon, Pierre Victurnien Vergniaud and others

History
- Election: 1791
- Legislature term: 6 September 1791 – 2 September 1792
- Successor: Government of the National Convention

The Kingdom of the French (the remnant of the preceding absolutist Kingdom of France) was a short-lived constitutional monarchy that existed from 3 September 1791 until 21 September 1792, when it was succeeded by the French First Republic.

On 3 September 1791, the National Constituent Assembly forced King Louis XVI to accept the French Constitution of 1791, thus turning the absolute monarchy into a constitutional monarchy.

After the 10 August 1792 Storming of the Tuileries Palace, the Legislative Assembly on 11 August 1792 suspended the constitutional monarchy. The freshly elected National Convention abolished the monarchy on 21 September 1792, thus, ending 203 years of consecutive Bourbon rule over France.

== Background ==
Since 1789, France underwent a revolution in its government and social orders. A National Assembly declared itself into being and promulgated their intention to provide France with a fair and liberal constitution. Louis XVI was forced to move to Paris in October of that year as a result of the march on Versailles, and growing fear for the survival of his reign and the royal family lead in June of 1791 to the failed escape attempt known as the Flight to Varennes. The attempted flight severely damaged any positive public opinion for the monarchy.

Leopold II, the Habsburg emperor of the Holy Roman Empire and brother of Marie Antoinette, the queen of France, in July sent out a diplomatic note asking for support of the other rulers of Europe to rally and demand the French royal family's freedom, and while the response of other powers was weak, it did cause the Holy Roman Empire and Prussia to engage in talks to settle their outstanding disputes. Leopold II in late August then together with Frederick William II of Prussia released the Declaration of Pillnitz. The declaration stated that Prussia and Austria wished to restore Louis XVI to absolute power but would only attempt to do so with the assistance of the other European powers.

== Constitution ==
Louis XVI was forced to submit to the Constitution of 1791 by the National Assembly in the aftermath of his Flight to Varennes. The Constitution of 1791, which established the Kingdom of the French, was revolutionary in its content. It abolished the nobility of France and declared all men to be equal before the law. Louis XVI had the ability to veto legislation that he did not approve of, as legislation still needed Royal Assent to come into force.

== Republic ==
Louis XVI reluctantly declared war on Austria on 20 April 1792, bowing to the Assembly's wishes. Prussia allied with Austria and therefore France was at war with Prussia as well. The Duke of Brunswick, Commander of the Austrian and Prussian military, issued the Brunswick Manifesto in 1792; it brought about the Storming of the Tuileries on the 10th of August. The manifesto explicitly threatened the people of Paris with dire repercussions if they in any way harmed Louis XVI or his family. The Legislative Assembly was inundated with requests for the monarchy's demise. The President of the National Assembly responded by suspending the monarchy on 11 August, pending the outcome of elections for another assembly. The newly elected National Convention, elected under universal male suffrage, abolished the monarchy on 21 September 1792 and proclaimed a republic. Louis was executed by guillotine on 21 January 1793.

Portfolio	Minister	Took office	Left office	Party
King of the French	Louis XVI	6 September 1791	2 September 1792	N/A
Minister of Finances	Louis Hardouin Tarbé	29 May 1791	24 March 1792	Feuillant
Minister of Finances	Étienne Clavière	24 March 1792	13 June 1792	Girondins
Minister of Finances	Antoine Duranton	13 June 1792	18 June 1792	Girondins
Minister of Finances	Jules de Beaulieu	18 June 1792	29 July 1792	Independent
Minister of Finances	René Delaville-Leroulx	29 July 1792	10 August 1792	Independent
Secretary of State for Foreign Affairs	Claude Antoine de Valdec de Lessart	29 November 1791	15 March 1792	Feuillant
Secretary of State for Foreign Affairs	Charles-François Dumouriez	15 March 1792	13 June 1792	Girondins
Secretary of State for Foreign Affairs	Pierre Paul de Méredieu	13 June 1792	18 June 1792	Independent
Secretary of State for Foreign Affairs	Victor de La Garde de Chambonas	18 June 1792	23 July 1792	Girondins
Secretary of State for Foreign Affairs	François Joseph de Gratet	23 July 1792	1 August 1792	Feuillant
Secretary of State for War	Louis de Narbonne-Lara	7 December 1791	9 March 1792	Feuillant
Secretary of State for War	Pierre Marie de Grave	9 March 1792	9 May 1792	Feuillant
Secretary of State for War	Joseph Servan	9 May 1792	13 June 1792	Girondins
Secretary of State for War	Charles-François Dumouriez	13 June 1792	18 June 1792	Girondins
Secretary of State for War	Pierre August Lajard	18 June 1792	23 July 1792	Feuillant
Secretary of State for War	Charles d'Abancour	23 July 1792	10 August 1792	Feuillant
Secretary of State of the Navy	Claude Antoine de Valdec	18 September 1791	7 October 1791	Feuillant
Secretary of State of the Navy	Bertrand de Molleville	7 October 1791	16 March 1792	Feuillant
Secretary of State of the Navy	Jean de Lacoste	16 March 1792	21 July 1792	Independent
Secretary of State of the Navy	François Joseph de Gratet	21 July 1792	10 August 1792	Feuillant
Keeper of the Seals	François Duport-Dutertre	21 November 1790	23 March 1792	Feuillant
Keeper of the Seals	Jean-Marie Roland	16 March 1792	14 April 1792	Girondins
Keeper of the Seals	Antoine Duranton	14 April 1792	4 July 1792	Girondins
Keeper of the Seals	Étienne Dejoly	4 July 1792	10 August 1792	Feuillant

== See also ==
- Louis XVI and the Legislative Assembly
