= Chambonas (disambiguation) =

Chambonas may refer to:

- Chambonas, a commune in the Ardèche department in southern France
- La Garde de Chambonas, the name of a French family
- Victor Scipion Charles Auguste de La Garde de Chambonas, the name of a French foreign minister of Louis XVI
- Château de Chambonas (in French), a medieval castle
