= Banne =

- Commune
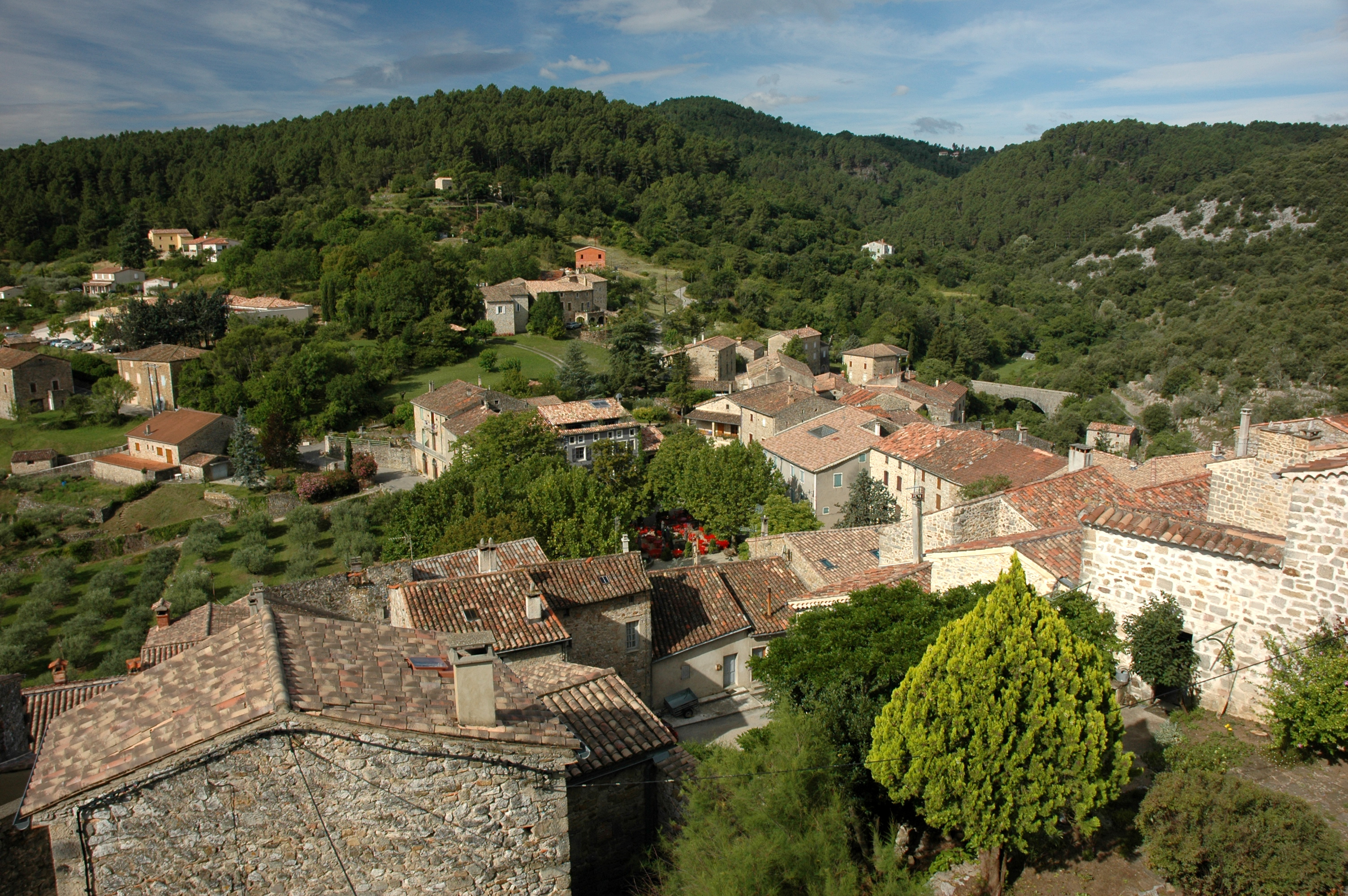
- A general view of Banne

- Coat of arms
- Location of Banne
- Location within France Location within Auvergne-Rhône-Alpes
- Coordinates: 44°22′03″N 4°09′23″E
- Country: France
- Region: Auvergne-Rhône-Alpes
- Department: Ardèche
- Arrondissement: Largentière
- Canton: Les Cévennes ardéchoises

Government
  - Mayor (2020–2026): Jean-Marie Laganier
- Area^{1}: 32.68 km^{2} (12.62 sq mi)
- Elevation: 280 m (920 ft)
- Highest elevation: 481 m (1,578 ft)
- Lowest elevation: 133 m (436 ft)
- Population (2023): 648
  - Density: 19.8/km^{2} (51.4/sq mi)
- Time zone: UTC+01:00 (CET)
  - Summer (DST): UTC+02:00 (CEST)
- INSEE/Postal code: 07024 /07460
- ^{1} French Land Register data, which excludes lakes, ponds, glaciers > 1 km^{2} (0.386 sq mi or 247 acres) and river estuaries.

Banne (French pronunciation: [ban]; Occitan: Bana) is a commune in the Ardèche department in the Auvergne-Rhône-Alpes region of southern France.

== Geography ==
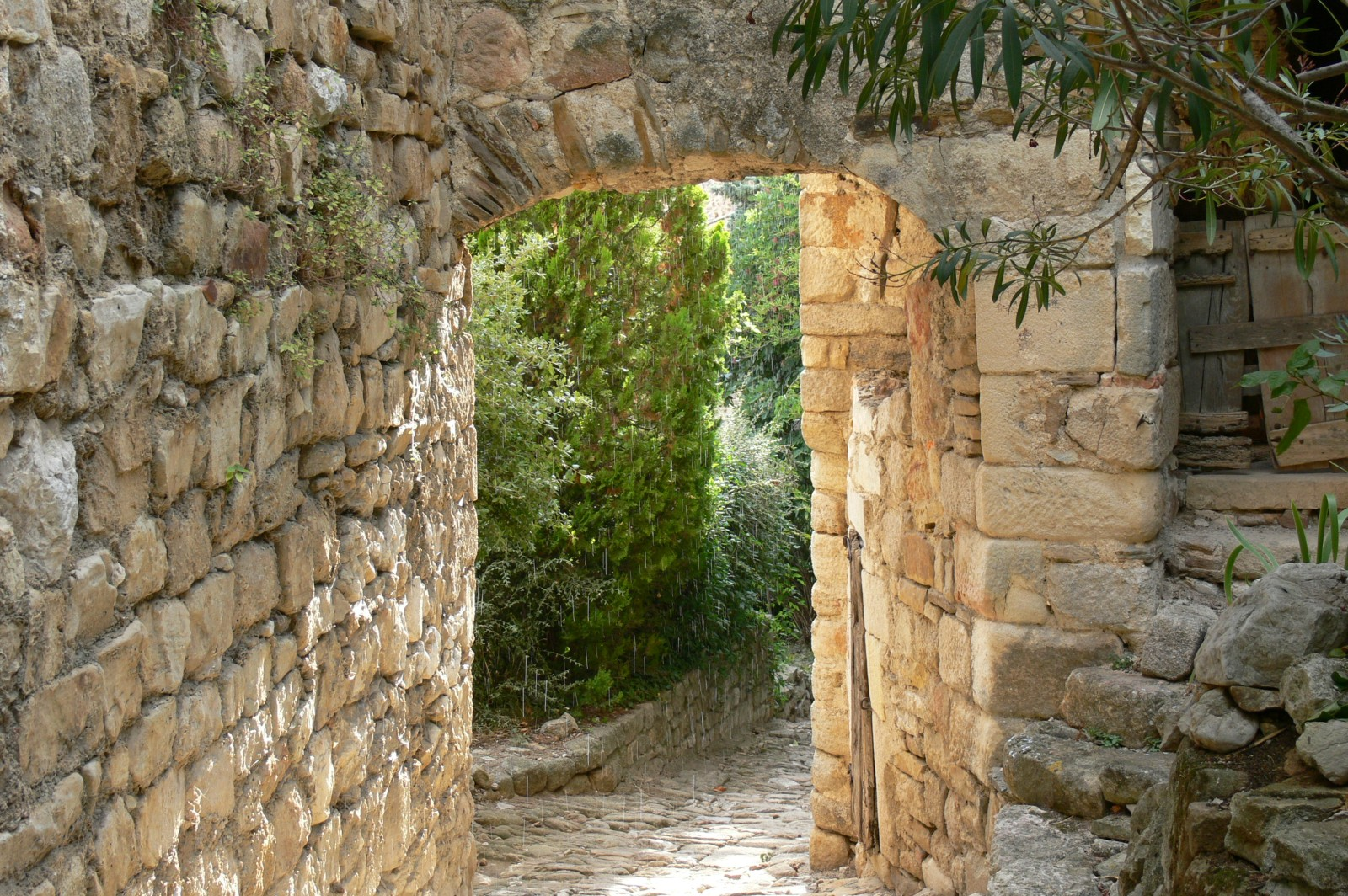
A narrow street in Banne

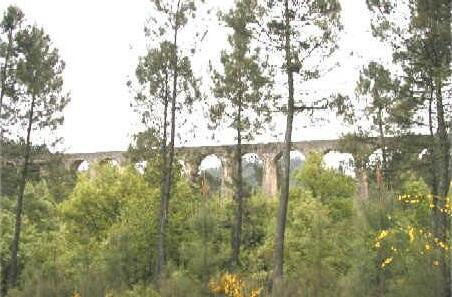
The Doulovy Viaduct

Banne is located some 32 km north by north-east of Alès and 40 km south by south-west of Aubenas. The southern border of the western arm of the commune is the departmental border between Ardèche and Gard. The village is at the top of a hill and seems cut in half with Le Fort to the north and L'Eglise to the south and a tangle of streets, stairways, and terraced gardens. It is an old mining town with coal deposits of high quality coke.

Access to the commune is by the D901 from Les Vans in the north which passes through the heart of the commune east of the village and continues south to Saint-Paul-le-Jeune. The D104 branches off the D901 in the south of the commune and goes north-east to Berrias-et-Casteljau. The D310 comes from the south and passes along the western edge of the commune to join the D216 to Les Vans just north of the commune. Access to the village is by the D251 from Saint-Paul-le-Jeune which continues to join the D310 in the commune. There are many hamlets in the commune apart from the village:

- les Avelas
- la Bildoire
- Cheyrès
- Garde Giral
- les Garidels
- la Lauze
- le Mazel
- Montgros
- les Pérusses
- Petit Brahic
- les Pialets
- Pigère
- la Planète
- le Poujol
- le Puech
- Sallefermouse

There is an area of farmland east of the village with most of the commune being forested.

The Granzon river rises in the north of the commune and flows east forming the northern border of the commune before turning south-east then east through the commune and continuing east to join the Chassezac near Maison Neuve. Several tributaries of the Granzon rise in the commune and flow northwards to join it including the Ruisseau de Doulovy, the Ruisseau de la Combe, the Ruisseau de l'Oulette, the Ruisseau de la Vernadelle, the Ruisseau de la Sauzède, and the Ruisseau de Claveysson.

The climate is of Mediterranean type.

=== History ===
During the French Revolution Count François-Louis de Saillans (1742–1792) attempted a royalist counter-revolution (the 3rd Camp de Jalès) with about 6,600 peasants. He captured Fort Banne in early July 1792. It was rapidly retaken by the General of Albignac who came to Bourgoin. A fire was started by the fighting which reduced the fort to ruins.

The French Revolution of 1848 was welcome in Banne and some of the inhabitants took the opportunity to challenge their mayor and ask for his revokaction by petition to the government commissioner. According to them he was protected by a former MP but he was actually part of a clique led by an opponent of Bayle and far from being motivated by republican ideals.

Until the mid-20th century several coal deposits were exploited in Banne with four concessions at: Montgros, Doulovy, Sallefermouse, and Pigère-Mazel. Together with Nieigles (today Lalevade-d'Ardèche), they were the only coal mines in Ardèche department. Since the closure of the mines forest has taken over the area (Bois des Bartres). Few traces of the mines remain except the magnificent Doulovy viaduct which was built in 1876. These deposits were the continuation of the Alès mining basin.

On 29 July 1944 several companies of maquisards decimated a German column who were marching to the north at the "Battle of Banne".

In 2008 the film Le Missionnaire was shot largely in the village. This was a film produced by Luc Besson, directed by Roger Delattre with Jean-Marie Bigard in the title role.

=== Heraldry ===
Arms of Banne	The official status of the blazon remains to be determined. Blazon: Party per fesse: at first party per pale, 1 Azure a half-antler Or in bend, 2 Azure, a tree of Or eradicated with 4 branches in 2 concentric redortes; at second Or with a inscription BANNE Sable in Arial capital letters.

== Administration ==
List of Successive Mayors

From	To	Name
	1848	Bayle
	1871	Albin Colomb
	1876	Joseph Peyric
	1877	Ferdinand Brahic
	1889	Camille Bayle
	1895	Jules Roussel
	1959	Maes
1959	1983	Marcel Thibon
1983	1989	Jacquet
1989	2008	Jean-Claude Cregut
2008	2026	Jean-Marie Laganier

== Demography ==
The inhabitants of the commune are known as Bannards or Bannardes in French.

Historical population

Year	Pop.	±% p.a.
1793	2,312	—
1800	2,424	+0.68%
1806	2,476	+0.35%
1821	2,565	+0.24%
1831	2,955	+1.43%
1836	1,810	−9.34%
1841	1,827	+0.19%
1846	1,927	+1.07%
1851	2,029	+1.04%
1856	2,250	+2.09%
1861	2,091	−1.46%
1866	2,046	−0.43%
1872	1,926	−1.00%
1876	1,728	−2.68%
1881	1,517	−2.57%
1886	1,476	−0.55%
1891	1,329	−2.08%
1896	1,246	−1.28%
1901	1,169	−1.27%

Year	Pop.	±% p.a.
1906	1,102	−1.17%
1911	1,169	+1.19%
1921	941	−2.15%
1926	838	−2.29%
1931	795	−1.05%
1936	730	−1.69%
1946	626	−1.53%
1954	591	−0.72%
1962	506	−1.92%
1968	446	−2.08%
1975	459	+0.41%
1982	505	+1.37%
1990	535	+0.72%
1999	555	+0.41%
2007	642	+1.84%
2012	708	+1.98%
2017	666	−1.22%
2023	648	−0.46%

Source: EHESS and INSEE

== Culture and heritage ==
=== Festivities and events ===
The Votive festival of Banne is held each year on the first weekend of August. This festival usually takes place over three days and is organized by the festival committee of Banne (CBF). It begins on Friday evening with a ball then continues on Saturday afternoon with petanque competitions and, in the evening, a grand ball. Finally on Sunday afternoon a goat trifecta is run to end up with a big meal in the evening.

=== Sites and Monuments ===
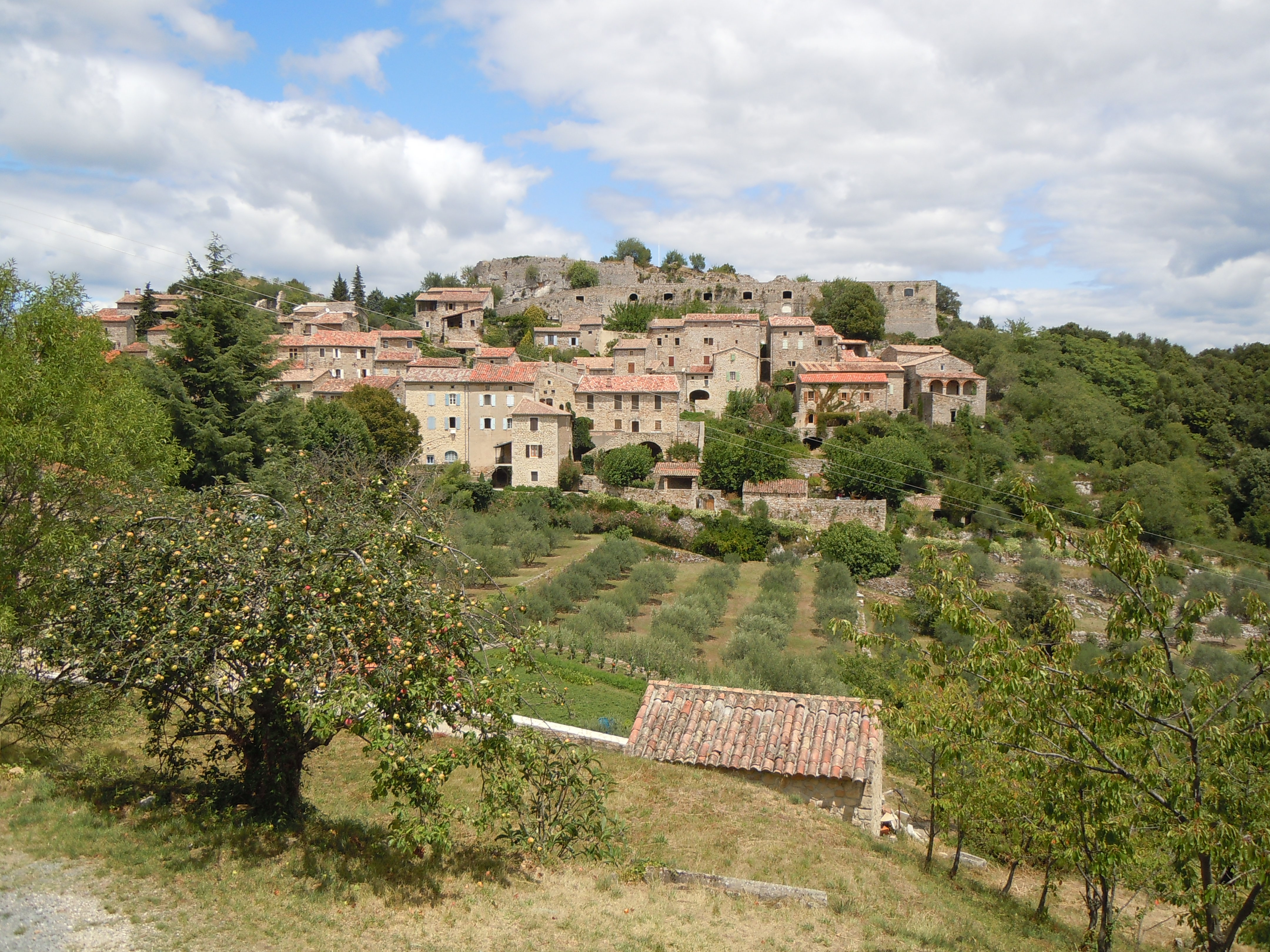
Site of the Chateau of Banne

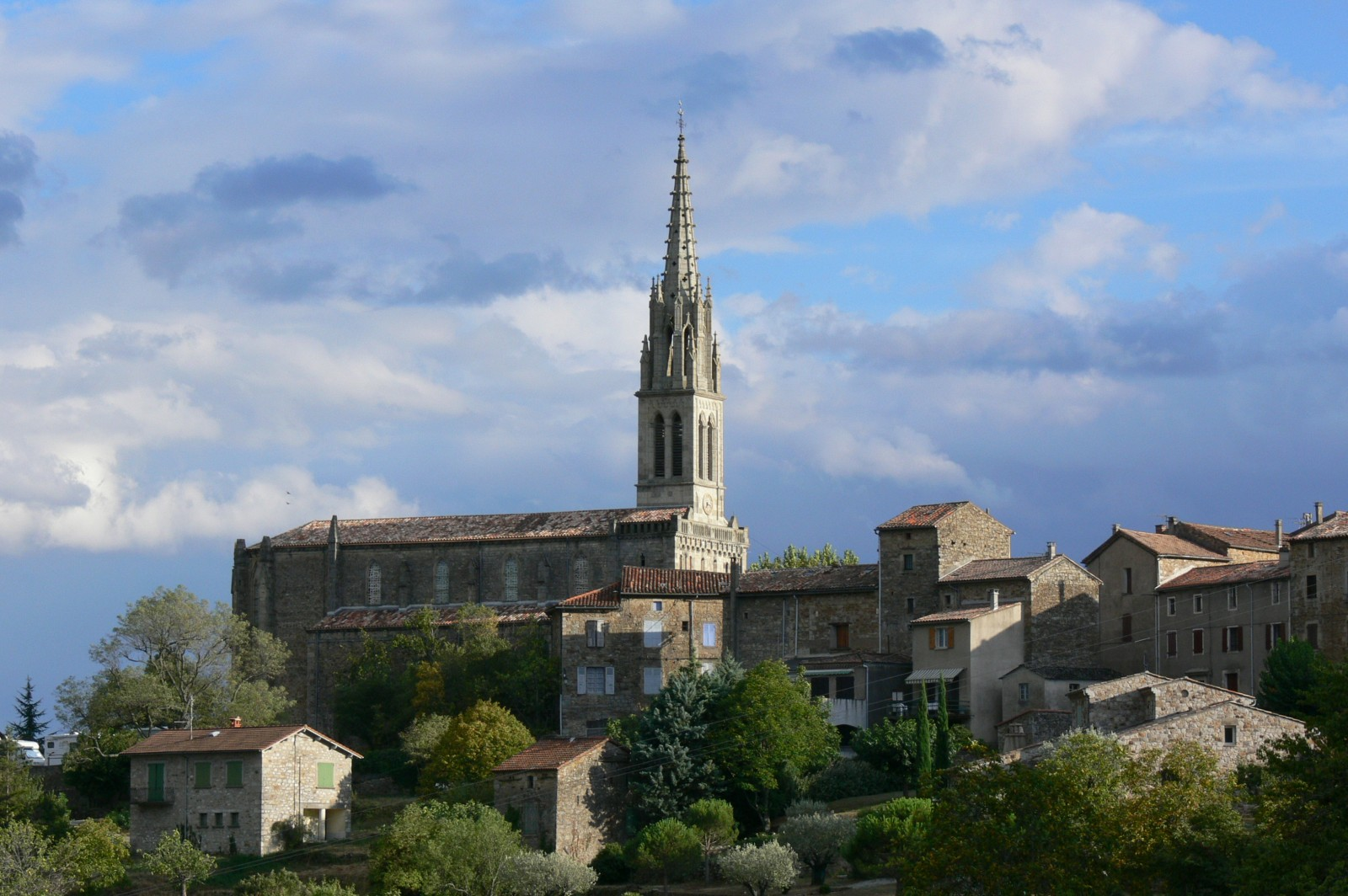
The Church of Banne

- The Lauze Dolmen (Neolithic) is registered as an historical monument.
- The Medieval village and the ruins of the Chateau of Banne
- The Chayeau of Lèbres
- The Chateau of Larque
- The Church of Saint Peter from the 19th century contains several items that are registered as historical objects:
  - A framed Stole and Maniple from Father Nadal (18th century)
  - The main Altar (19th century)
  - A Pulpit (1877)
- A Wayside Cross (1741) at the Place du Fort is registered as an historical object.
- The Doulovy Viaduct, a former railway bridge for the Banne mines built in 1876 (near the hamlet of Frigolet). Dimensions: 235 m long, 24 arches, 35 m high, 1.35 m wide

=== Environmental heritage ===
Several places are classified as natural areas of ecological interest, flora and fauna:

- The Bois de Païolive (Païolive Woods)
- The Forêt de Banne (Banne forest)
- The lower reaches of the Granzon
- The Ganière and Abeau streams

=== Banne Picture Gallery ===
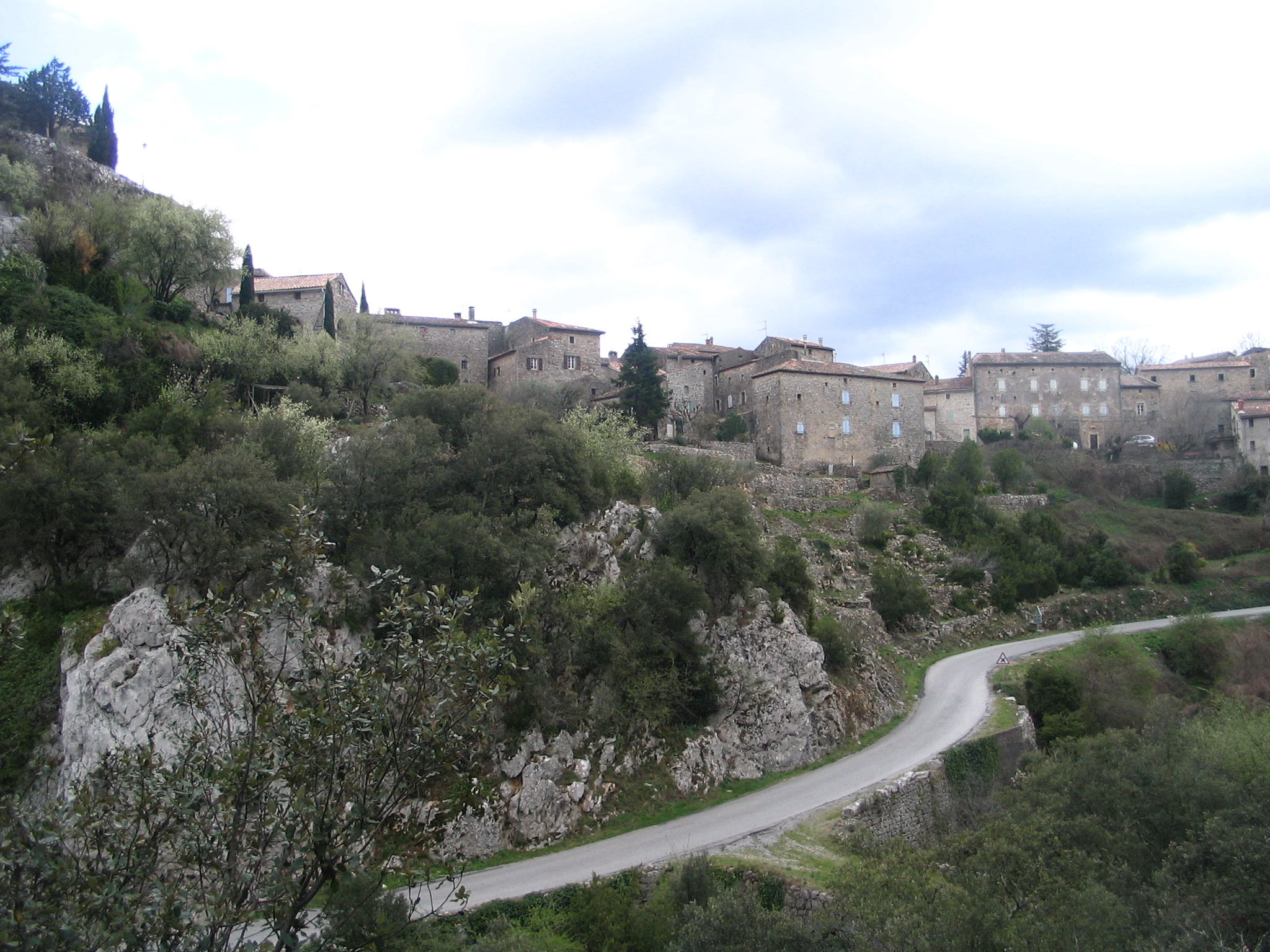
Banne landscape

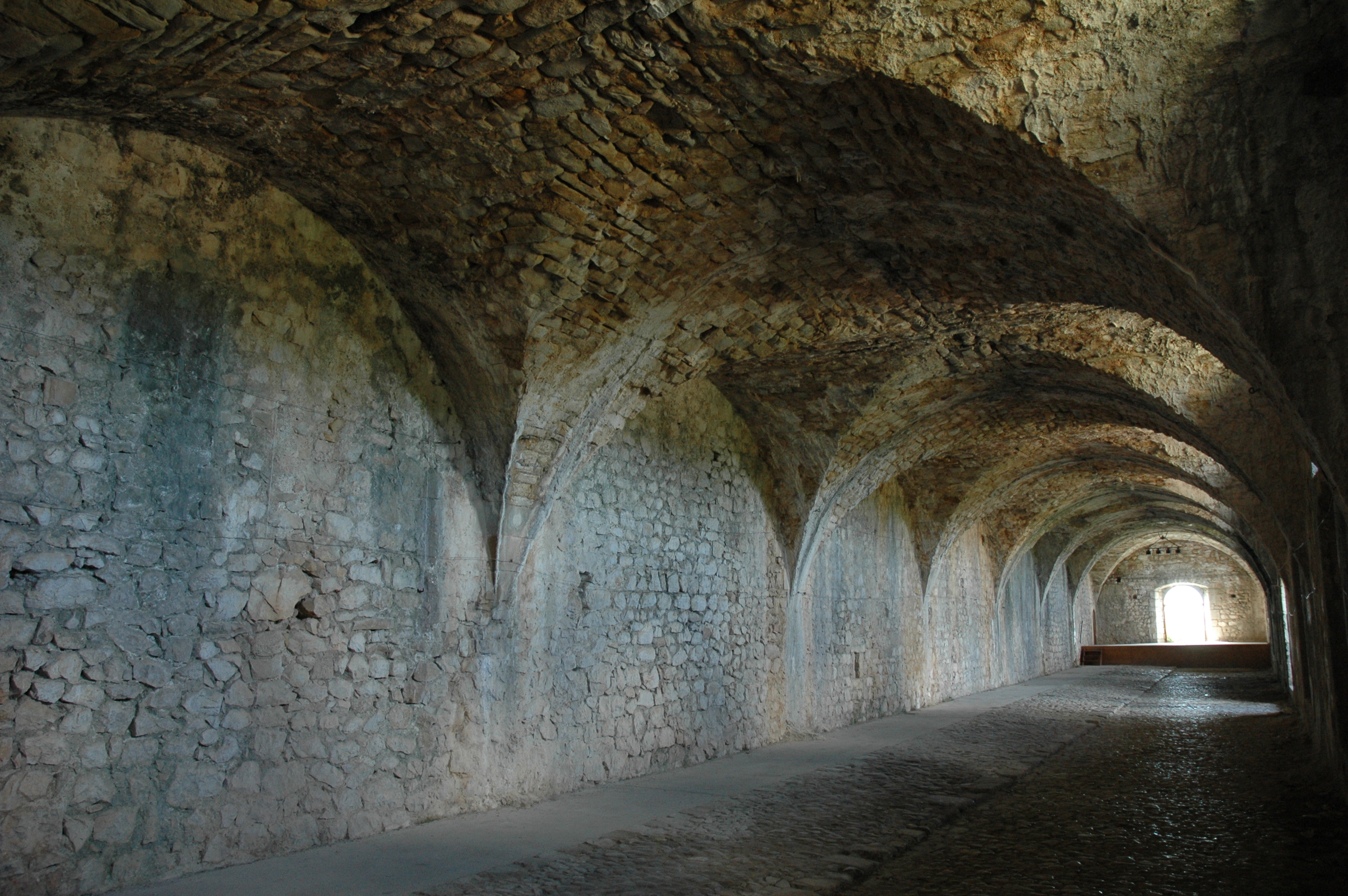

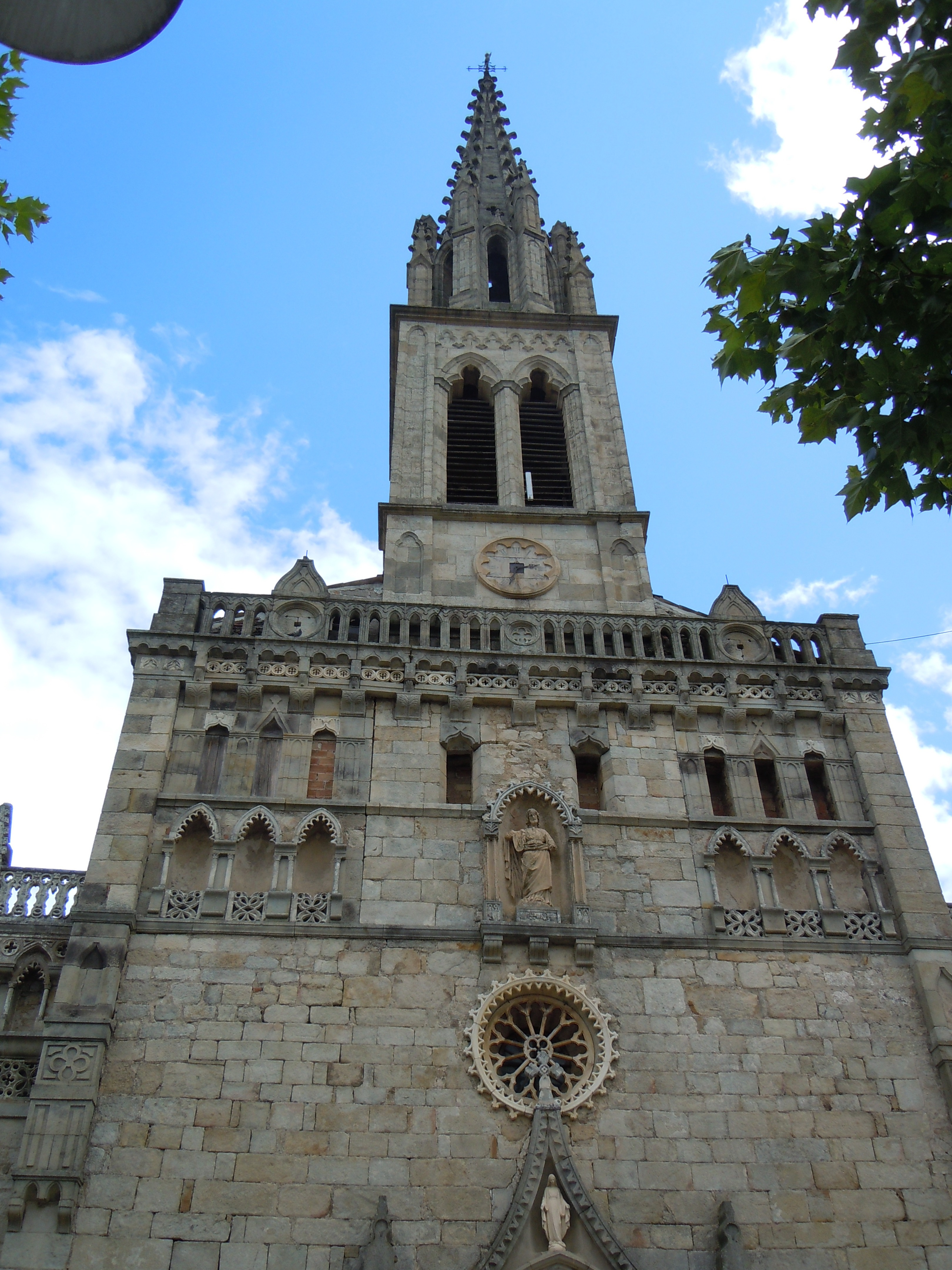
The front of the Church

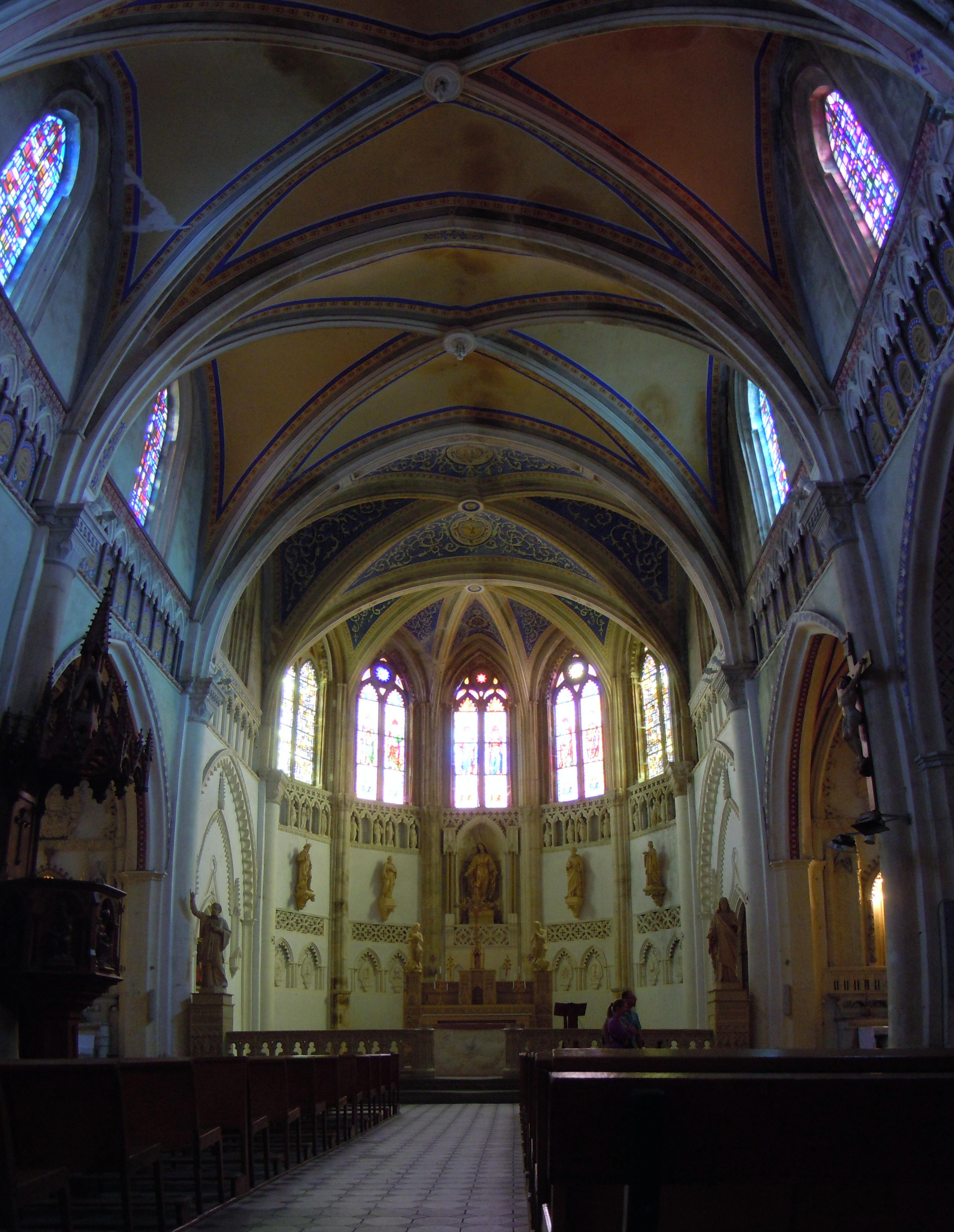
The Nave

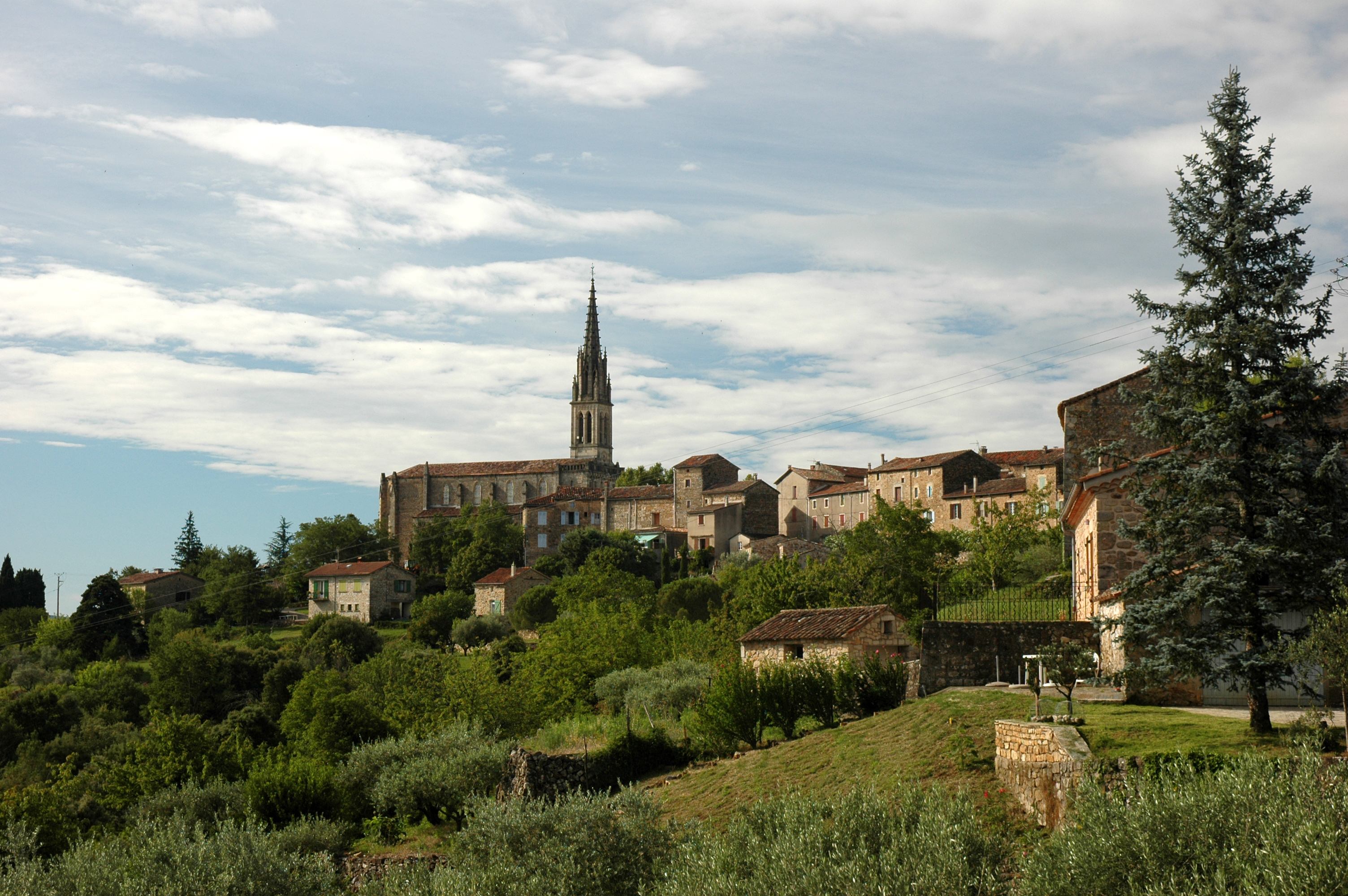

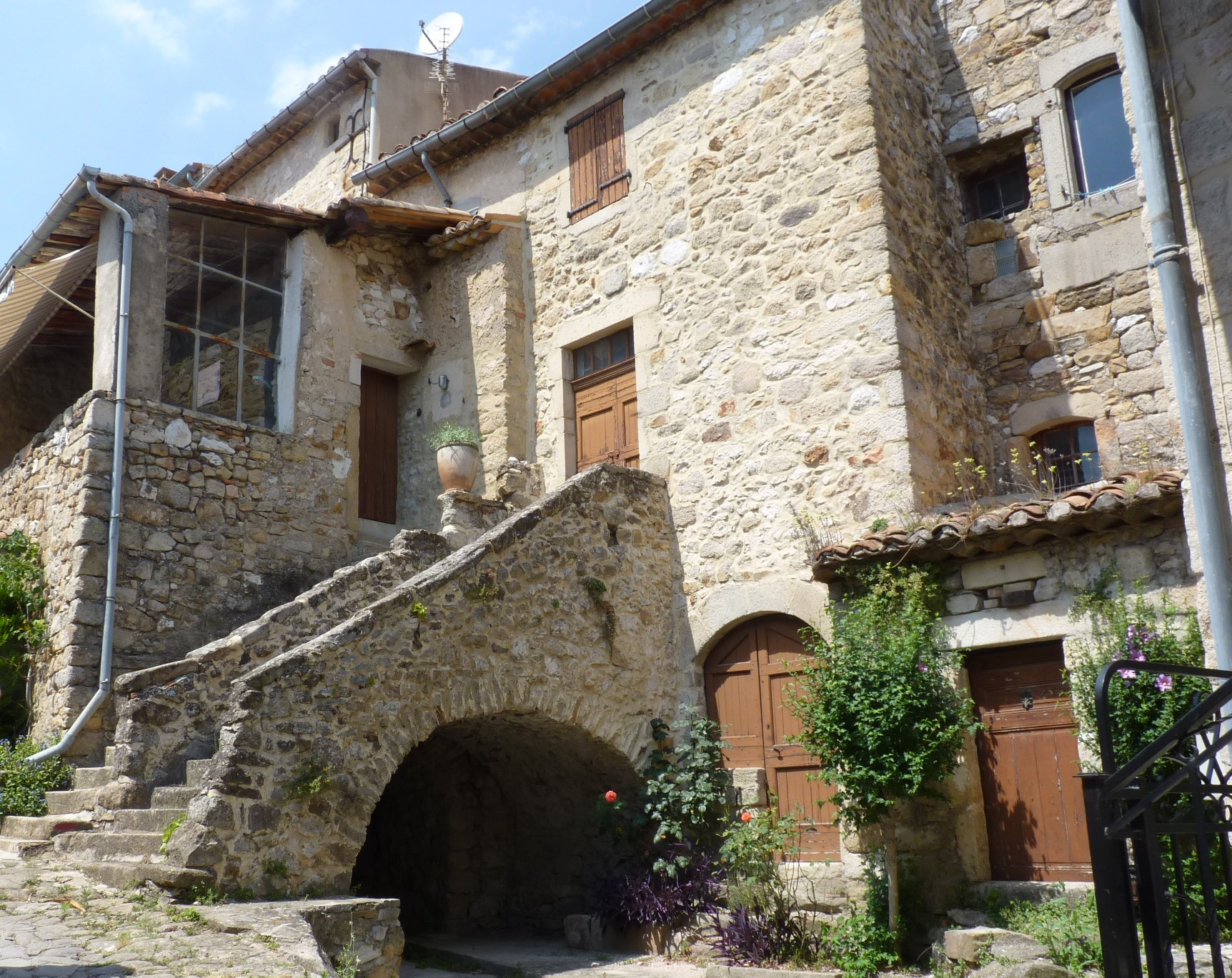

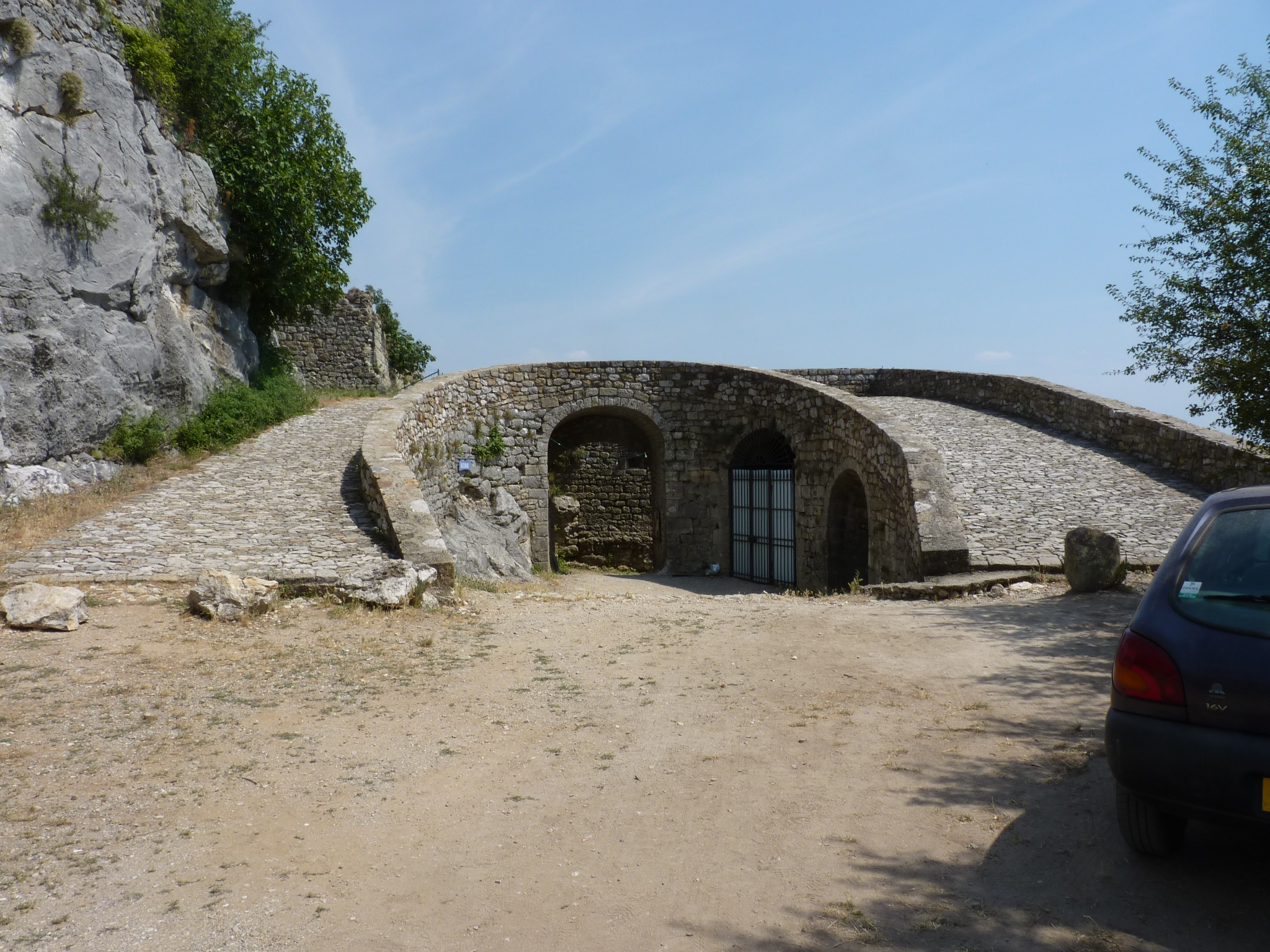
Access ramp to the Chateau

== Notable people linked to the commune ==
- Paul Maës, Mayor of the commune during the "Battle of Banne" on 29 July 1944: he offered himself as a hostage to prevent German reprisals.

== See also ==
- Communes of the Ardèche department
