= Louis Hardouin Tarbé =

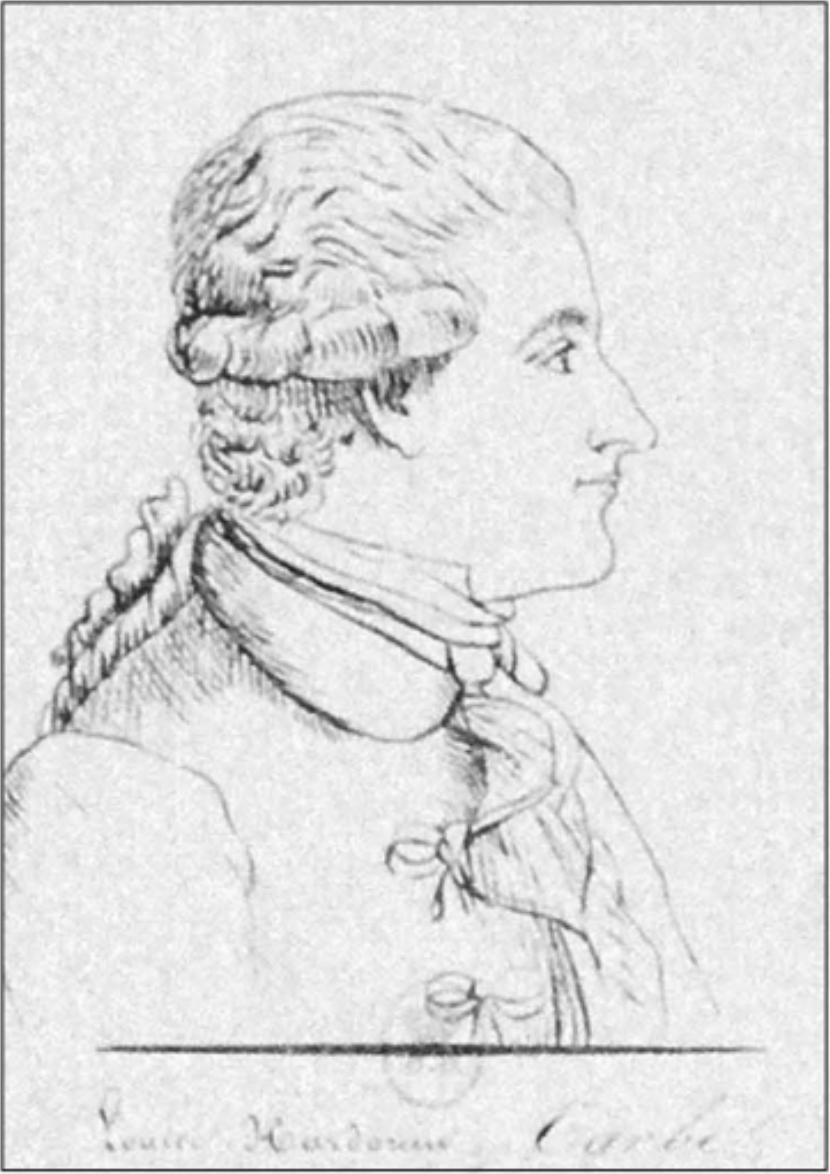

Minister of Contributions and Public Revenues
- In office 29 May 1791 – 24 March 1792
- Monarch: Louis XVI
- Preceded by: Claude Antoine Valdec de Lessart
- Succeeded by: Étienne Clavière

Personal details
- Born: 11 August 1753 Sens, France
- Died: 7 July 1806 (aged 52) Paris, France
- Occupation: Lawyer, civil servant, politician

Louis Hardouin Tarbé (11 August 1753 – 7 July 1806) was an 18th- and 19th-century French lawyer, civil servant, and politician. He served as Minister of Contributions and Public Revenues – the post of finance minister under the French Revolution – from 29 May 1791 to 24 March 1792.

Louis-Hardouin Tarbé, a senior official at the Contrôle général des finances, collaborated on drafting the regulations that established the provincial assemblies in the summer of 1787.

== Biography ==
Born in Sens on 11 August 1753, Louis Hardouin Tarbé came from a family of printers and booksellers. His father, Pierre-Hardouin Tarbé, was a prominent printer in Sens.

Tarbé studied law and became an attorney. He entered royal administration as a senior clerk (premier commis) in the Ministry of Finance under Jacques Necker and Charles Alexandre de Calonne. He later became director of contributions under Claude Antoine Valdec de Lessart.

On 29 May 1791, during the constitutional monarchy, Louis XVI appointed him Minister of Contributions and Public Revenues (Minister of Finance). In this role, Tarbé organized the new financial administration of revolutionary France. He was primarily responsible for establishing the land contribution (contribution foncière) to replace the abolished taxes of the Ancien Régime – the taille, gabelle, and vingtième.

Deeply attached to the king and aligned with the Feuillants (constitutional monarchists), Tarbé left office with other Feuillant ministers on 24 March 1792, making way for the Girondins.

Proscribed on 15 August 1792 following the storming of the Tuileries and the fall of the monarchy, Tarbé went into hiding and survived the Reign of Terror. He subsequently refused all offers of employment, even though the Council of Five Hundred placed him on the list of candidates for the Directory.

He died in Paris on 7 July 1806 at the age of 52.

== Family ==
His father, Pierre-Hardouin Tarbé, was a printer in Sens. His mother was Colombe Catherine Pigalle. He was the brother of Prosper Hardouin Tarbé (1758–1813), a lawyer and deputy to the Estates-General of 1789, and of Charles Hardouin Tarbé (1760–1799).

== Bibliography ==
- Dawson, Philip (1932). Provincial Magistrates and Revolutionary Politics in France, 1789-1795. Harvard University Press.
- Detrez, Alfred (1953). Le Faubourg Saint-Honoré, de Louis XIV au Second Empire (in French). FeniXX réédition numérique. ISBN 9782307340324.
- Rachelin-Deforenne, M., ed. (1873–1874). État présent de la noblesse française contenant le dictionnaire de la noblesse contemporaine (in French) (4th ed.). Paris: Librairie Bacherin de Florence. ISBN 9785873581702.
- Bertrand-de-Molleville, Antoine-François (1909). Fortescue, George Knottesford (ed.). Private Memoirs of A.F. Bertrand de Moleville, Minister of State, 1790-1791, Relative to the Last Year of the Reign of Louis the Sixteenth. Vol. 1. Caxton Publishing Company. p. 150.
- Annuaire de la noblesse de France et des maisons souveraines de l'Europe (in French). Vol. 28. Bureau de la publication. 1872.
- Société archéologique de Sens (1897). Bulletin de la Société archéologique de Sens (in French). Vol. 18. Imprimerie et lith. de Thomas-Malvin. p. 59.
- Bouillet, Marie-Nicolas; Chassang, Alexis (1878). "Louis-Hardouin Tarbé". Dictionnaire universel d'histoire et de géographie (in French). Hachette.
