= Intendant of Brittany =

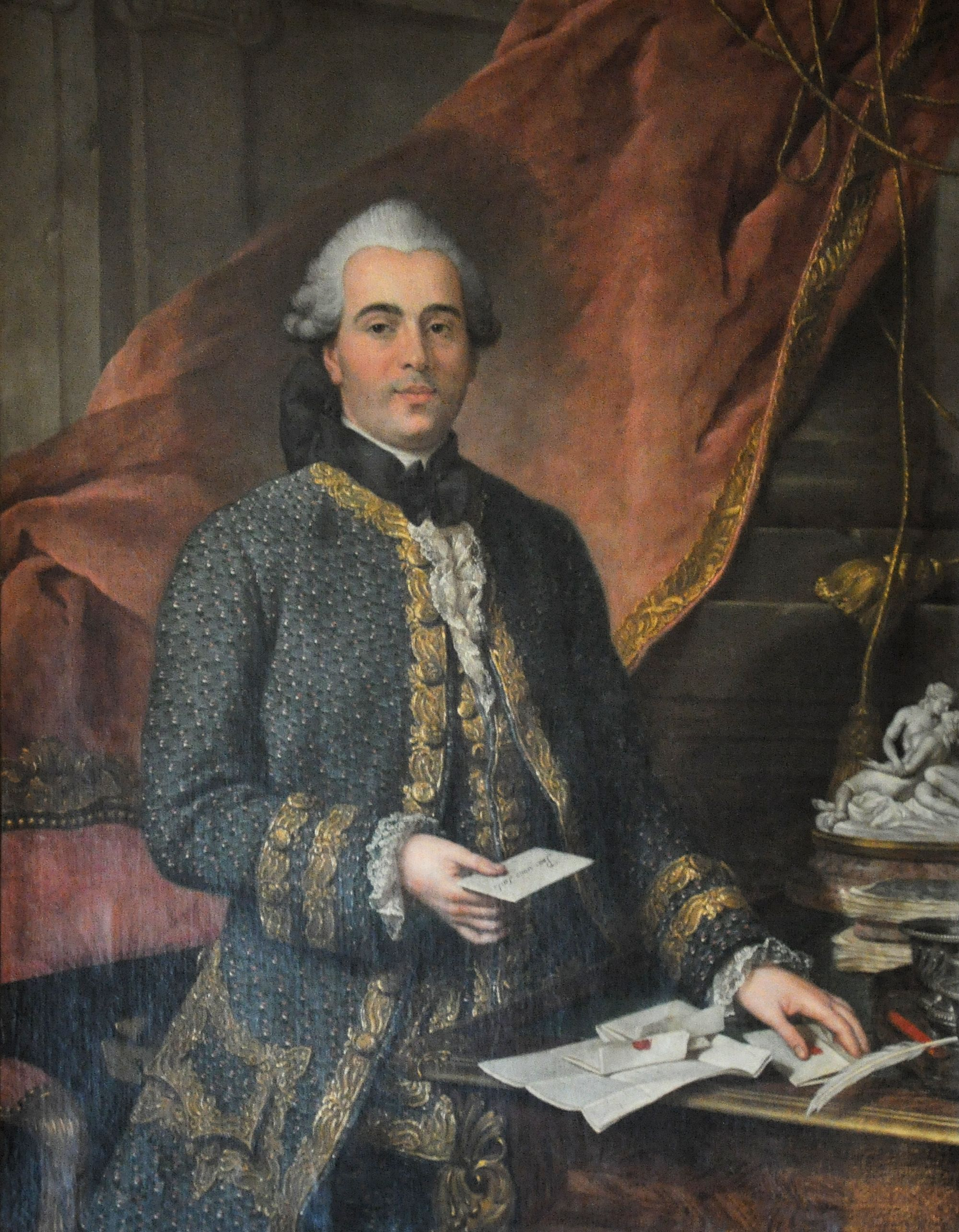
Alleged portrait of Jacques de Flesselles, governor of Brittany in 1765

The Intendancy of Brittany was an intendancy created in 1689 by Louis XIV, after 2 attempts to do so in 1636 and 1647. The governor of Brittany had a more prestigious role, but the intendant was the essential relay for the monarch's will.

== List of holders ==
- Auguste-Robert de Pomereu, 1689-1692
- Louis de Béchameil, 1692-1705, put in place from the sub-delegates
- Ferrand de Villemilan, 1705-1716
- Paul Esprit Feydeau de Brou, 1716-1728
- Des Gallois de la Tour, 1728-1735
- Pontcarré de Viarmes, 1735-1753
- Le Bret, 1753-1765
- Jacques de Flesselles, 1765-1767
- François Marie Bruno d'Agay, 1767-1771
- Guillaume-Joseph Dupleix de Bacquencourt, 1771-1774
- Gaspard-Louis Caze, baron de la Bove, 1774-1784
- Antoine François de Bertrand-Molleville, 1784-1788
- François-Germain Dufaure de Rochefort, 1788 - resigned to the Directory on 31 August 1790.

== History of the institution ==
(...)

In 1786, the headquarters of the intendance was displaced to Nantes to remove it from the immediate influence of the parliament and the Estates General or their committees. The towns of Brest, Chateaubriand, Le Croisic, Dinan, La Guerche, Lamballe, Montfort and Saint-Brieuc sent letters of protest in reply to the letter that they had received from the community of Rennes; the officers of the présidial or the corporations joined this movement, as did the officers of the maîtres-perruquiers.

== See also ==
- Intendant

== Sources ==
- Henri Fréville, L'Intendance de Bretagne (1689–1790). Essai sur l'histoire d'une intendance en Pays d'États au XVIIIe siècle, Thèse. Rennes, Plihon, 1953. 3 vol.
- Séverin Canal, Les origines de l'intendance de Bretagne, H. Champion, Paris, 1911, aussi publié par les Annales de Bretagne de 1911 à 1915.
