= Arnail François, marquis de Jaucourt =

French aristocrat and politician

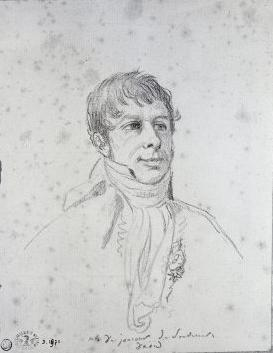
Jacques-Louis David - Count Jacques-Louis David - Count Francois-Arnail de Jaucourt-Arnail de Jaucourt.jpg

Arnail François, marquis de Jaucourt, comte de l'Empire (14 November 1757 – 5 February 1852) was a French aristocrat and politician.

== Biography ==
=== Military career and Revolution ===
Jaucourt was born in Tournon (Seine-et-Marne) of a Protestant family, protected by Louis Joseph de Bourbon, prince de Condé, whose Dragoon regiment he entered at the age of fifteen. He became colonel of his regiment, and made himself known for his welcoming of the French Revolution and his affiliation with the Feuillants.

A deputy to the Legislative Assembly in 1791, elected by the département of Seine-et-Marne, he generally voted with the minority. As his views came to be considered too moderate by his colleagues, he resigned in 1792, and was soon after arrested on suspicion of being a reactionary. Madame de Staël obtained his release from Louis Pierre Manuel just before the September Massacres. He made his way to England, and joined the group who during 1792-93 took refuge at Juniper Hall in Surrey, supported by Madame de Stael, who later joined them. He returned to France after the execution of King Louis XVI.

=== Consulate and First Empire ===
Jaucourt took refuge in Switzerland to escape the Reign of Terror, and returned only after Napoleon Bonaparte's 18 Brumaire coup and the establishment of the French Consulate, entering the tribunate, of which he was the president for a short period.

In 1803, Jaucourt entered the French Senate, and next year, upon the establishment of the First Empire, he became attached to the household of Joseph Bonaparte. He accompanied Joseph to the Kingdom of Naples, and was created a count of the Empire by Napoleon.

=== Restoration, July Monarchy, and later years ===
During the following years, Jaucourt distanced himself from the imperial cause, and, with the Bourbon Restoration he became Minister of State and a Peer of France. After the outcome of the Hundred Days (during which he stood by Louis XVIII), he was Naval Minister in July–September 1815, but held no further office. He devoted himself to the support of the Protestant interest in France, and tried to reduce the effects of the White Terror.

A member of the upper house after the July Revolution and throughout the reign of Louis Philippe I (the July Monarchy), he was driven into private life by the establishment of the Second Republic, but lived to see the 1851 coup and to rally to the government of Louis-Napoléon Bonaparte, dying in Paris the next year.

Political offices
Preceded by Denis Decrès	Ministers of Marine and the Colonies; 9 July 1815 – 26 September 1815	Succeeded by François Joseph de Gratet, vicomte Dubouchage
