= Les Salelles, Ardèche =

Les Salelles
- Commune
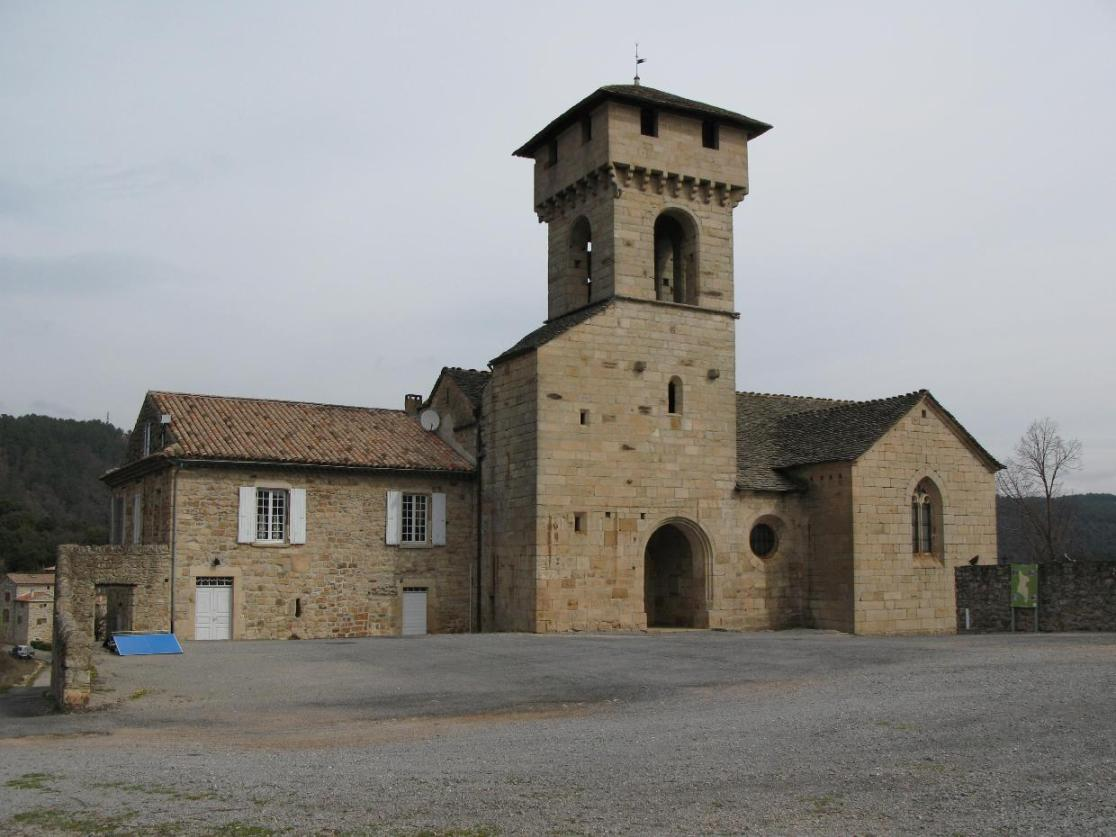
- The church in Les Salelles
- Location of Les Salelles
- Location within France Location within Auvergne-Rhône-Alpes
- Coordinates: 44°26′05″N 4°06′13″E
- Country: France
- Region: Auvergne-Rhône-Alpes
- Department: Ardèche
- Arrondissement: Largentière
- Canton: Les Cévennes ardéchoises
- Intercommunality: Pays des Vans en Cévennes

Government
  - Mayor (2020–2026): Georgette Deschanels
- Area^{1}: 5.61 km^{2} (2.17 sq mi)
- Elevation: 406 m (1,332 ft)
- Highest elevation: 543 m (1,781 ft)
- Lowest elevation: 152 m (499 ft)
- Population (2023): 414
  - Density: 73.8/km^{2} (191/sq mi)
- Time zone: UTC+01:00 (CET)
  - Summer (DST): UTC+02:00 (CEST)
- INSEE/Postal code: 07305 /07140
- ^{1} French Land Register data, which excludes lakes, ponds, glaciers > 1 km^{2} (0.386 sq mi or 247 acres) and river estuaries.

Les Salelles (French pronunciation: [le salɛl]) is a commune in the Ardèche department in southern France.

== Geography ==
The commune is traversed by the river Chassezac.

== Population ==
Historical population
Year	Pop.	±% p.a.
1968	192	—
1975	186	−0.45%
1982	181	−0.39%
1990	173	−0.56%
1999	210	+2.18%
2007	297	+4.43%
2012	335	+2.44%
2017	366	+1.79%
2023	414	+2.08%
Source: INSEE

== See also ==
- Communes of the Ardèche department
