= La Garde de Chambonas =

French noble family

Coat of arms of the family de La Garde

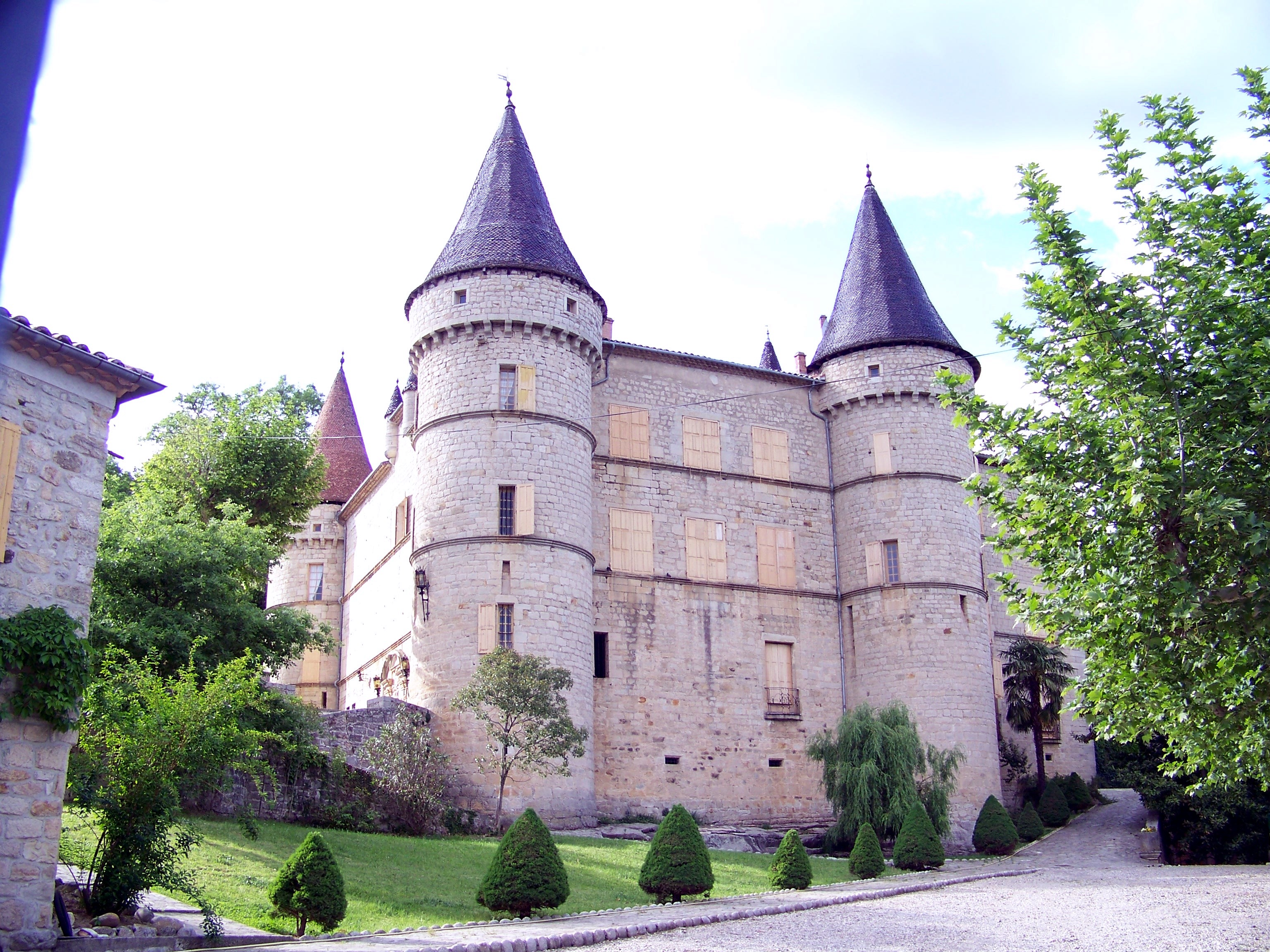
castle of Chambonas

The marquessate of La Garde de Chambonas is a title held by a French noble family whose origin is located in Auvergne and Gévaudan. The family La Garde is first quoted as holders of a lordship in 1152 and the dignity rank of marquessate in 1683.

The ascertained filiation began in the 14th century. The last marquess died in 1927 and his only son was killed at war in 1918. The name is still borne by the descendants.

== Main personalities ==
The two main personalities of the family are:

1. Victor Scipion Charles Auguste de La Garde de Chambonas (1750 in Chambonas-1830 in Paris), a general who embraced the ideas of the French Revolution, first constitutional mayor of Sens, and one of the last foreign minister of Louis XVI (June-July 1792).
2. Guy Azaïs de La Garde de Chambonas (1942), navy officer, diplomat, deputy chief of the French secret services (1993-1997), ambassador of France to Benin (1989-1992), Columbia (1997-2000), and Angola (2004-2007).

== Posterity ==
According to the traditional principles of nobility in France, the title and the noble character of the family definitely end in 1927. However, according to the French law, surnames lost due to causes of war (1923) may be granted to the grandsons of the war hero. Hence there are two branches in this family.

1. Rollin de La Garde de Chambonas
2. Azaïs de La Garde de Chambonas

== Heraldry ==

Armes de la famille de La Garde de Chambonas

Azure, a chief Argent

Its motto is "Deus, Rex, Amici" ("the Lord, the King, our Friends").
