= Malarce-sur-la-Thines =

- Commune
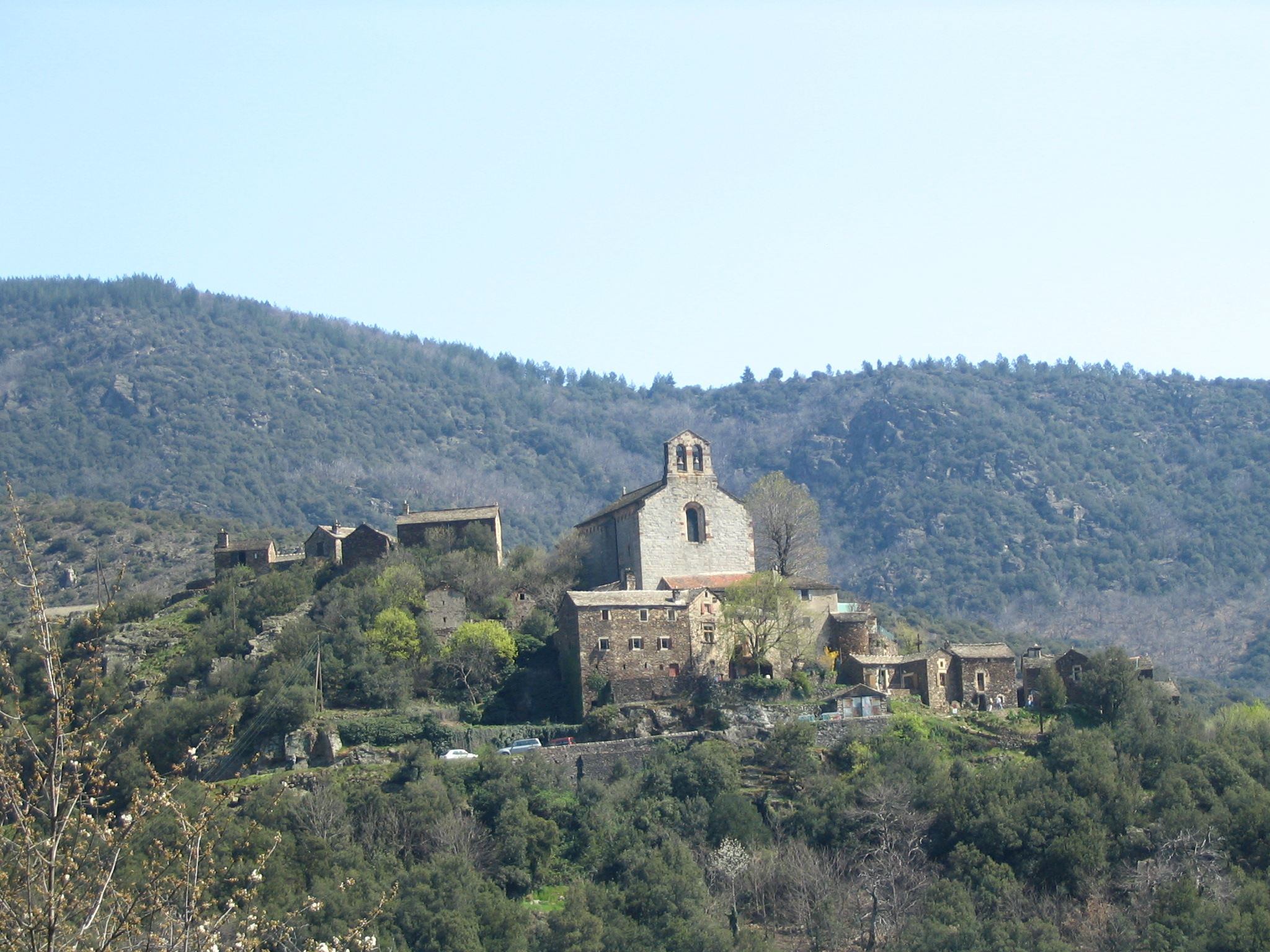
- The village of Thines
- Location of Malarce-sur-la-Thines
- Location within France Location within Auvergne-Rhône-Alpes
- Coordinates: 44°26′48″N 4°04′23″E
- Country: France
- Region: Auvergne-Rhône-Alpes
- Department: Ardèche
- Arrondissement: Largentière
- Canton: Les Cévennes ardéchoises

Government
  - Mayor (2020–2026): Delphine Feuillade-Briere
- Area^{1}: 37.34 km^{2} (14.42 sq mi)
- Elevation: 330 m (1,080 ft)
- Highest elevation: 1,062 m (3,484 ft)
- Lowest elevation: 172 m (564 ft)
- Population (2023): 268
  - Density: 7.18/km^{2} (18.6/sq mi)
- Time zone: UTC+01:00 (CET)
  - Summer (DST): UTC+02:00 (CEST)
- INSEE/Postal code: 07147 /07140
- ^{1} French Land Register data, which excludes lakes, ponds, glaciers > 1 km^{2} (0.386 sq mi or 247 acres) and river estuaries.

Malarce-sur-la-Thines (French pronunciation: [malaʁs syʁ la tin]; Occitan: Malarça de Tina) is a commune in the Ardèche department in southern France. The commune was formed in 1975 when Thines and Lafigère were fused with Malarce. The commune is traversed by the river Chassezac.

== Population ==
Historical population
Year	Pop.	±% p.a.
1968	196	—
1975	188	−0.59%
1982	200	+0.89%
1990	244	+2.52%
1999	258	+0.62%
2007	252	−0.29%
2012	226	−2.15%
2017	244	+1.54%
2023	268	+1.58%
Source: INSEE

== See also ==
- Communes of the Ardèche department
