= Sainte-Marguerite-Lafigère =

- Commune
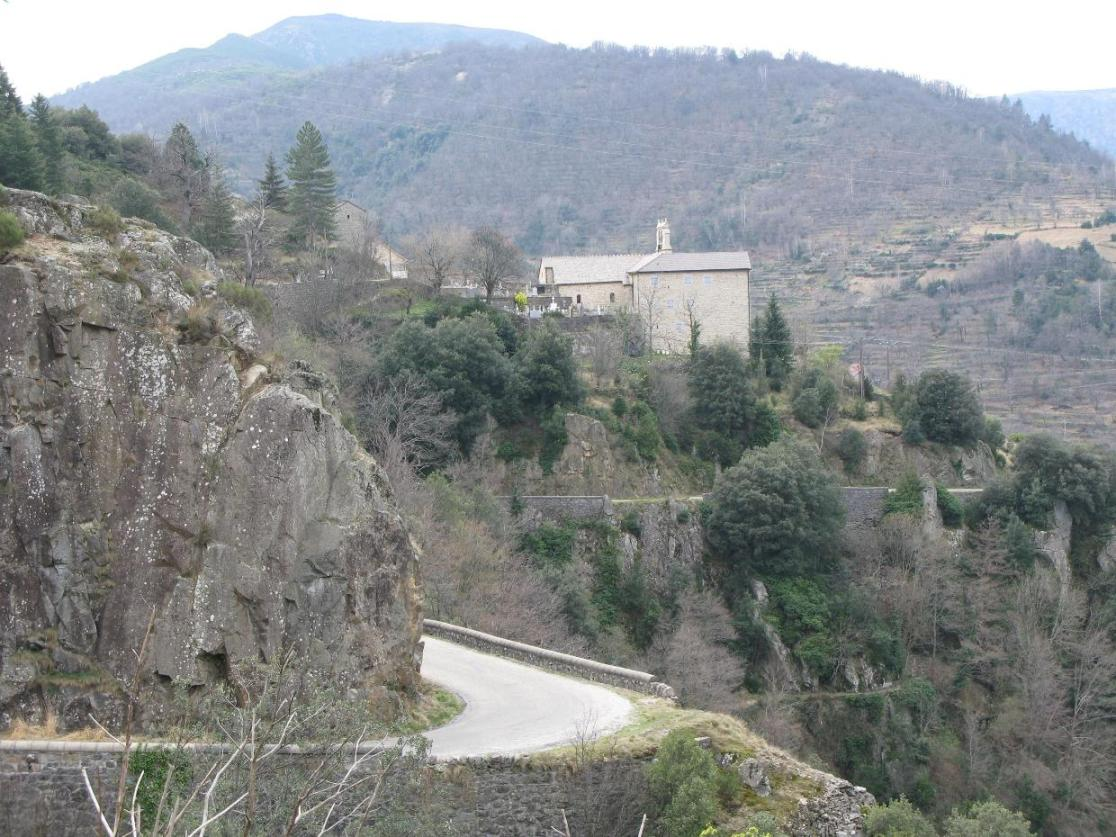
- A general view of Sainte-Marguerite-Lafigère
- Location of Sainte-Marguerite-Lafigère
- Location within France Location within Auvergne-Rhône-Alpes
- Coordinates: 44°28′43″N 3°59′20″E
- Country: France
- Region: Auvergne-Rhône-Alpes
- Department: Ardèche
- Arrondissement: Largentière
- Canton: Les Cévennes ardéchoises

Government
  - Mayor (2020–2026): Daniel Noel
- Area^{1}: 10.07 km^{2} (3.89 sq mi)
- Elevation: 450 m (1,480 ft)
- Highest elevation: 1,000 m (3,300 ft)
- Lowest elevation: 255 m (837 ft)
- Population (2023): 111
  - Density: 11.0/km^{2} (28.5/sq mi)
- Time zone: UTC+01:00 (CET)
  - Summer (DST): UTC+02:00 (CEST)
- INSEE/Postal code: 07266 /07140
- ^{1} French Land Register data, which excludes lakes, ponds, glaciers > 1 km^{2} (0.386 sq mi or 247 acres) and river estuaries.

Sainte-Marguerite-Lafigère (French pronunciation: [sɛ̃t maʁɡərit lafiʒɛʁ]; Occitan: Santa Margarida Lafigèira) is a commune in the Ardèche department in southern France.

== Geography ==
The commune is traversed by the river Chassezac.

== Population ==
Historical population
Year	Pop.	±% p.a.
1968	172	—
1975	149	−2.03%
1982	129	−2.04%
1990	91	−4.27%
1999	73	−2.42%
2007	80	+1.15%
2012	87	+1.69%
2017	107	+4.23%
2023	111	+0.61%
Source: INSEE

== See also ==
- Communes of the Ardèche department
