= Malons-et-Elze =

- Commune
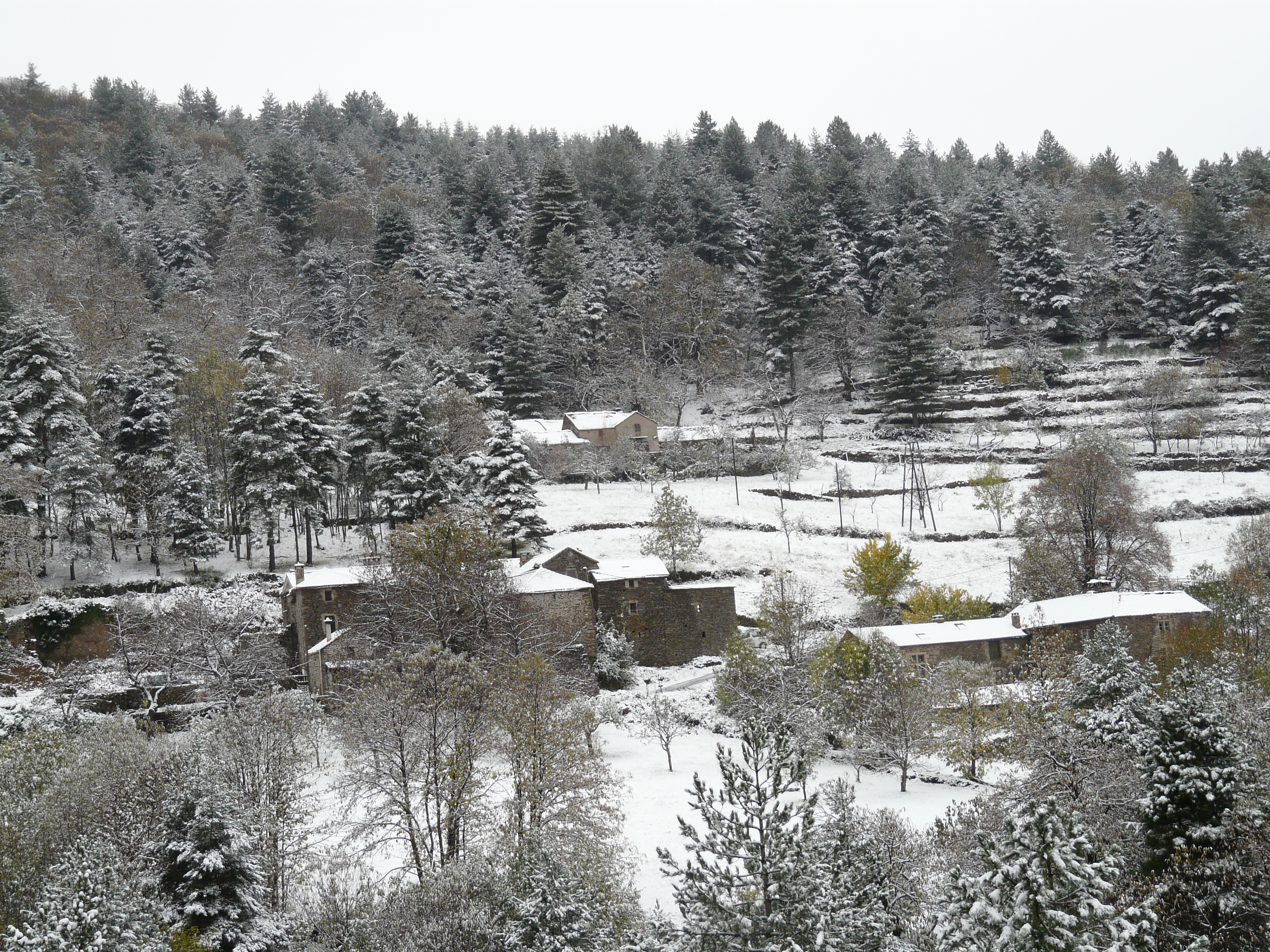
- Hamlet of Valouze

- Coat of arms
- Location of Malons-et-Elze
- Location within France Location within Occitanie
- Coordinates: 44°25′07″N 4°01′25″E
- Country: France
- Region: Occitania
- Department: Gard
- Arrondissement: Alès
- Canton: La Grand-Combe
- Intercommunality: Mont Lozère

Government
  - Mayor (2020–2026): Jean Oliva
- Area^{1}: 31.21 km^{2} (12.05 sq mi)
- Elevation: 850 m (2,790 ft)
- Highest elevation: 997 m (3,271 ft)
- Lowest elevation: 219 m (719 ft)
- Population (2023): 111
  - Density: 3.56/km^{2} (9.21/sq mi)
- Time zone: UTC+01:00 (CET)
  - Summer (DST): UTC+02:00 (CEST)
- INSEE/Postal code: 30153 /30450
- ^{1} French Land Register data, which excludes lakes, ponds, glaciers > 1 km^{2} (0.386 sq mi or 247 acres) and river estuaries.

Malons-et-Elze is a commune in the Gard department in southern France.

== Geography ==
The commune is traversed by the river Chassezac.

== Population ==
Historical population
Year	Pop.	±% p.a.
1968	99	—
1975	95	−0.59%
1982	98	+0.45%
1990	88	−1.34%
1999	83	−0.65%
2007	94	+1.57%
2012	114	+3.93%
2017	125	+1.86%
2023	111	−1.96%
Source: INSEE

== See also ==
- Communes of the Gard department
