= Prévenchères =

- Commune
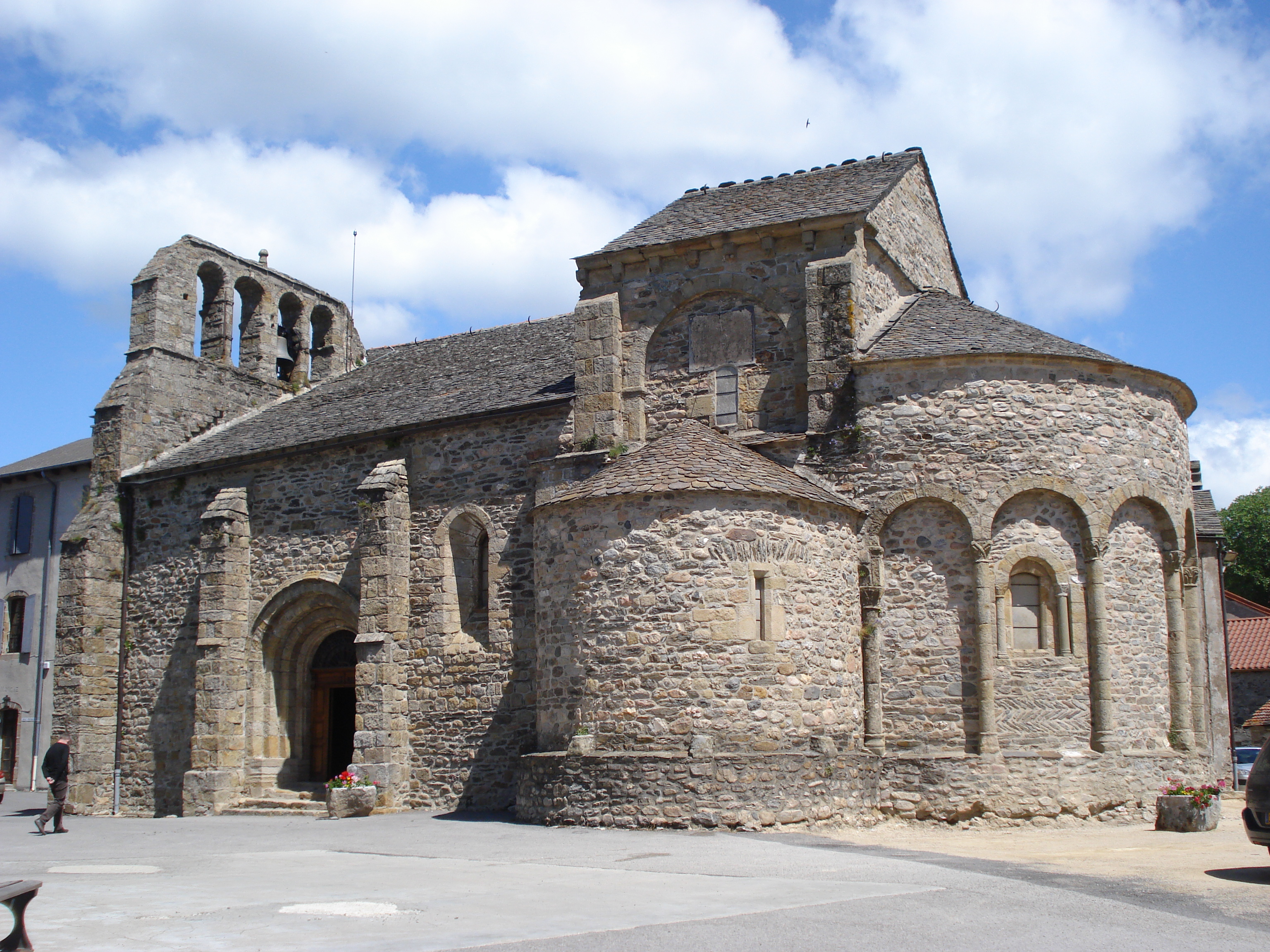
- Church of Prévenchères
- Location of Prévenchères
- Location within France Location within Occitanie
- Coordinates: 44°31′20″N 3°54′37″E
- Country: France
- Region: Occitania
- Department: Lozère
- Arrondissement: Mende
- Canton: Saint-Étienne-du-Valdonnez
- Intercommunality: CC Mont Lozère

Government
  - Mayor (2020–2026): Olivier Maurin
- Area^{1}: 62.75 km^{2} (24.23 sq mi)
- Elevation: 860 m (2,820 ft)
- Highest elevation: 1,294 m (4,245 ft)
- Lowest elevation: 337 m (1,106 ft)
- Population (2023): 267
  - Density: 4.25/km^{2} (11.0/sq mi)
- Time zone: UTC+01:00 (CET)
  - Summer (DST): UTC+02:00 (CEST)
- INSEE/Postal code: 48119 /48800
- ^{1} French Land Register data, which excludes lakes, ponds, glaciers > 1 km^{2} (0.386 sq mi or 247 acres) and river estuaries.

Prévenchères (French pronunciation: [pʁevɑ̃ʃɛʁ]; Occitan: Prevenchièiras) is a commune in the Lozère department in southern France. Its village of La Garde-Guérin is a member of Les Plus Beaux Villages de France (The Most Beautiful Villages of France) Association.

== Geography ==
The village lies on the left bank of the Chassezac, which flows southeastward through the western part of the commune.

== See also ==
- Communes of the Lozère department
