= René Delaville-Leroulx =

French finance minister

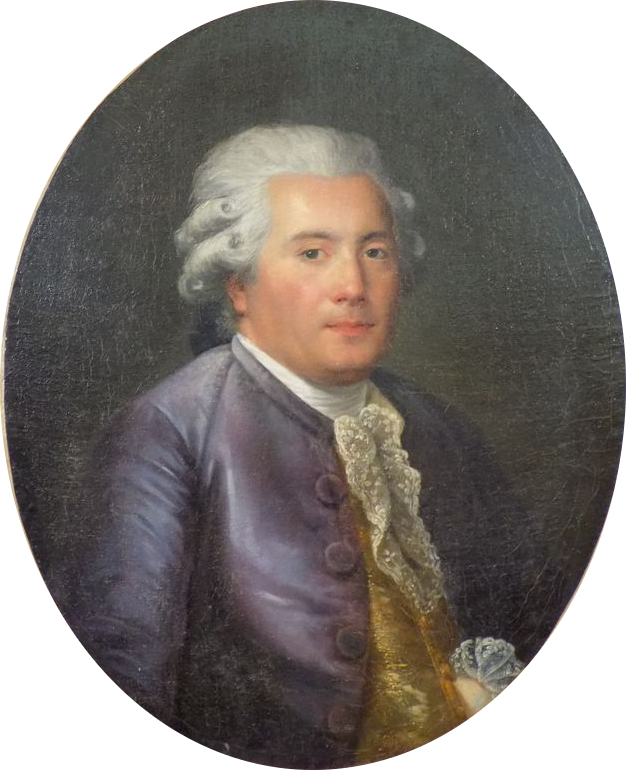
- Portrait of René Delaville-Leroulx, 1784, painted by his daughter Marie-Guillemine Benoist

Minister of Contributions and Public Revenues
- In office 29 July 1792 – 10 August 1792
- Monarch: Louis XVI
- Preceded by: Jules-Émile-François Hervé de Beaulieu
- Succeeded by: Étienne Clavière

Personal details
- Born: 3 December 1743 Le Blanc, France
- Died: 12 August 1797 (aged 53) Rotterdam, Netherlands
- Occupation: Administrator, politician

René Le Roulx de La Ville, known as Delaville-Leroulx (3 December 1743 – 12 August 1797), was a French administrator and politician of the late 18th century.

== Biography ==
Delaville-Leroulx was born in Le Blanc on 3 December 1743. He was the grandson of Joseph Le Roux and the brother of Joseph Delaville Le Roulx.

He entered the civil service in 1764. He also practiced as a lawyer before the parlement and served as first secretary to the first presidency of the parlement of Toulouse.

In 1775, after passing a competitive examination, he became deputy to the senior clerk of the India department. He was also a Freemason, affiliated with the lodge "Saint-Père des Vrais Frères" in Paris and served as a deputy to the Grand Orient of France.

In 1782, he was appointed director of the king's salt works, a position under the General Farm administration. He later became one of the general directors of the Farm bureaus, handling correspondence related to tobacco purchases.

In 1789, he was an administrator of the Paris Commune for the Temple section. Through his brother, he knew Jacques Necker and met with him in February 1789 while defending the interests of the Third Estate.

In October 1790, he was elected a municipal officer and administrator for the department of public works.

He served as Minister of Contributions and Public Revenues from 29 July 1792 to 10 August 1792 – a brief tenure of less than two weeks, ending with the fall of the monarchy.

In 1795, he was appointed French consul in Rotterdam. At the time of his death in 1797, he held the position of commissioner for the navy and commerce of France in Rotterdam.

== Bibliography ==
- Saint-Denis ou le Jugement dernier des rois (in French). FeniXX réédition numérique. 1992. ISBN 9782402397728.
- Baetjer, Katharine (2019). French Paintings in the Metropolitan Museum of Art from the Early Eighteenth Century Through the Revolution. Metropolitan Museum of Art. ISBN 9781588396617.
- Jones-Imhotep, Edward (2026). The Broken Machine: Histories of Technology, Social Order, and the Self. MIT Press. ISBN 9780262384711.
- Paris (France). Assemblée électorale (1894). Charavay, Étienne (ed.). Assemblée électorale de Paris: 26 août 1791 – 12 août 1792 (in French). D. Jouaust.
- Antonetti, Guy (25 January 2013). Les ministres des Finances de la Révolution française au Second Empire (I): Dictionnaire biographique 1790-1814 (in French). Institut de la gestion publique et du développement économique.
