= Pierre Paul de Méredieu, baron de Naillac =

French politician

Pierre Paul de Méredieu, baron de Naillac (17 August 1737 – 1813) was a French politician. He was minister of Foreign Affairs of 13 June 1792 to 18 June 1792 in the Government of Louis XVI. He also served as captain of cavalry and was Chevalier de Saint-Louis.

He was born on 17 August 1737 in Périgueux. He was the son of Eymeric Méredieu, lord of Amboise and Elisabeth Vaucocour. He married Antoinette-Elisabeth de la Porte on 13 August 1780.

Political offices
Preceded by Charles Dumouriez	Minister of Foreign Affairs; 13 June 1792 - 18 June 1792	Succeeded by Scipion Victor, marquis de Chambonas
