= Antoine-François Bertrand de Molleville =

French politician and minister

Comte Antoine-François Bertrand de Molleville (20 October 1746, Toulouse ~ 30 December 1818, Paris) was a French politician.

A staunch monarchist, he was known as the enfant terrible of the monarchy. He was first conseiller to the Parlement de Toulouse in 1766, then maîtres des requêtes in 1774 and finally Intendant de Bretagne, in 1784. Bertrand de Molleville was then charged in 1788 with the difficult task of dissolving the Parlement of Rennes.

Favourable to the gathering of the estates general in 1789, he advised Louis XVI after the dissolution of the Assemblée. Made ministre de la Marine et des Colonies from 1790 to 1792, he organised the mass emigration of officers. Due to numerous denunciations, he retired from his functions and became chief of the royal secret police. Before and after the 10 August 1792, he tried to organise an escape for the king, but he was eventually forced to resolve to flee to England himself. Despite his dedication and his friendship for, he was one of his most untalented servants.

== Life ==
=== Youth ===
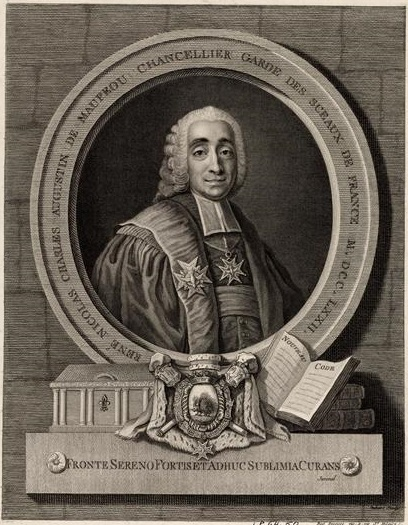
Maupeou

Antoine-François Bertrand de Molleville was received as a conseiller to the Parlement de Toulouse in 1766. His secretary was Bernard François Balssa, father of Honoré de Balzac, still in de Moleville's service in 1771.

Bertrand de Molleville served his apprentice in the school of minister Maupeou. He was maîtres des requêtes in 1774. In 1775, Bertrand de Molleville defended the memoir of his ancestor chancellor Jean Bertrand, seigneur de Frazin, attacked by Condorcet in his Éloge du chancelier de L'Hôpital, but he only published this apology after having communicated it to Condorcet lui-même.

Bertrand de Molleville was made Intendant de Bretagne in 1784.

=== Intendant de Bretagne (1784-89) ===
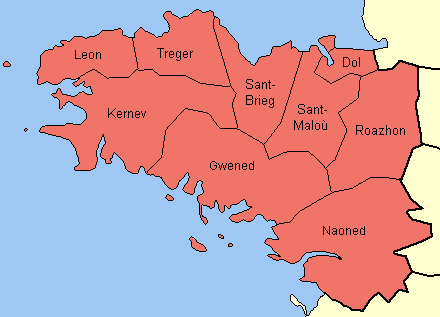
Brittany in 1789

In 1788, along with the Commander of Rennes, Governor Molleville went to Brittany to announce the royal edict that the Breton Parliament was abolished. The entire town turned out, and rumors began to spread that it wasn't a royal edict but a power move by the governor. Fighting broke out, civilians fighting soldiers, and rioters were able to get a noose around Molleville's neck, but he was saved at the last second by the Commander throwing down his sword into the street, saying he refused to fight the people, and by fraternizing with the masses, cooling tensions and saving the governor. Later in the same year, when the Pont Neuf was covered in troops preparing for the Revolution, he remarked he saw "those who later on took part in all the popular movements of the Revolution."

=== Minister for the Fleet and the Colonies ===
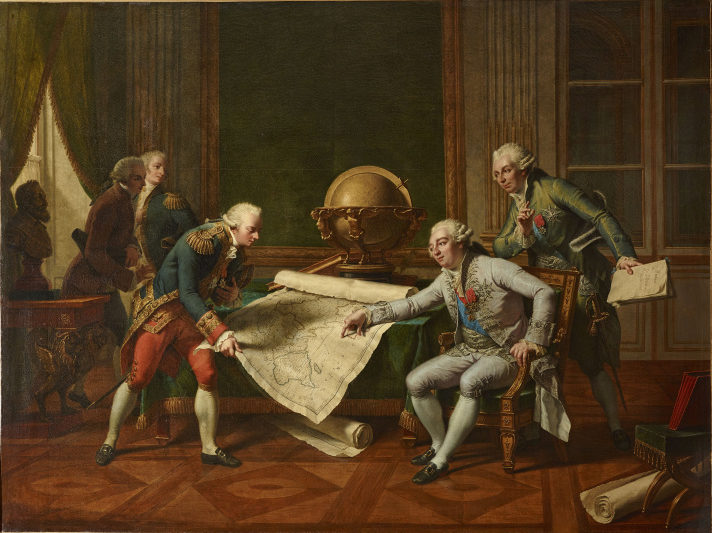
"Louis XVI gave France a powerful fleet, but in 1791 it was completely disorganised

=== The Royalist secret police ===
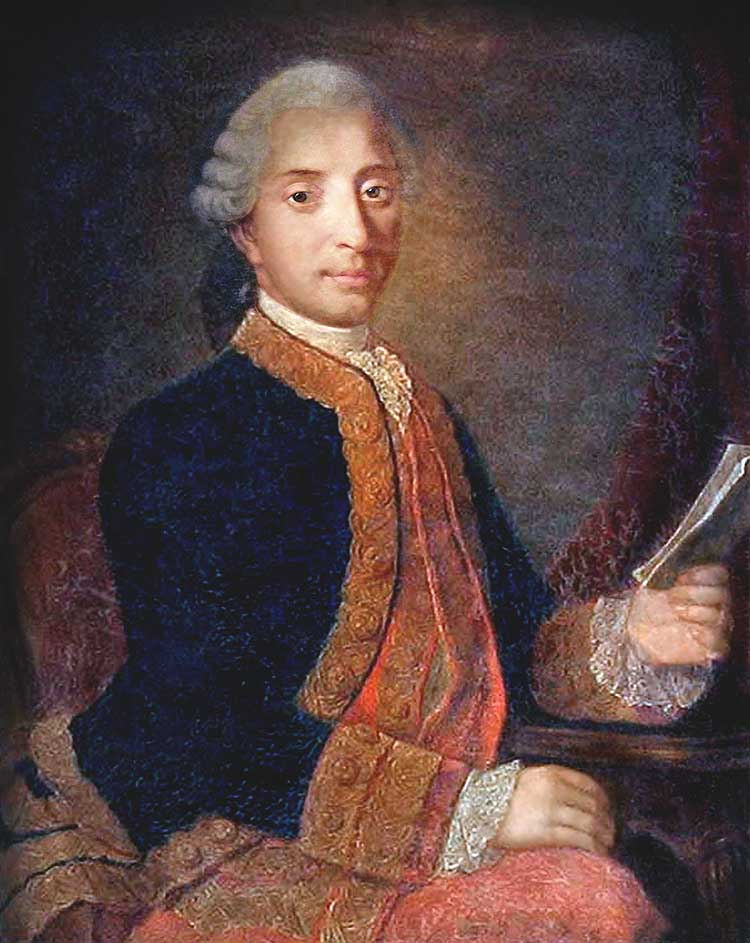
Arnaud de Laporte

=== Invention of the secateurs ===
In modern Europe, a scissors-type tool only used for gardening work has existed since the early 1800s. De Molleville is credited as the inventor of the secateurs in Figures pour l’almanach du bon jardinier: Répresentant les Utensiles le plus généralement employés dans la culture des Jardins, published in 1813.

=== After 10 August 1792 ===
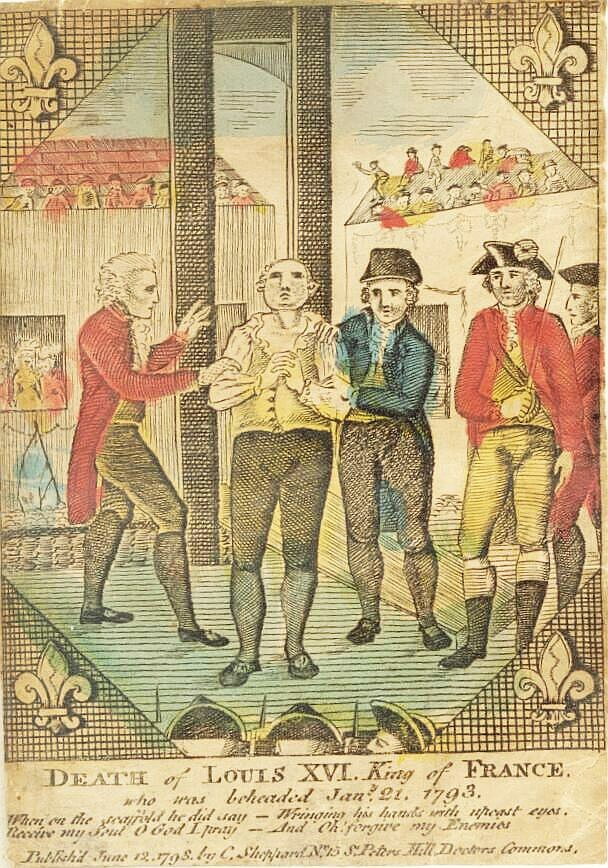
Bertrand de Molleville made several plans for the king's escape.

On his death in 1818, he was buried in the church of Ponsan-Soubiran.

=== Works ===
- Mémoires de Bertrand-Molleville

== Sources ==
- Histoire de la Révolution française by Jules Michelet
- Lapeyre et Rémy Scheurer, Les notaires et secrétaires du roi sous les règnes de L. XI, Ch. VIII et L. XII (1461–1515), Tome 2. Paris, 1978, in-4, 91 tablx, B.n.F. : 4° L45. (4-II)
- Gustave Louis Chaix d'Est-Ange, Dictionnaire des familles anciennes ou notables à la fin du XIXe siècle, Évreux, 1903–1929, 20 vol. in-8, e, tome : 4, p. 148 et suivantes, B.n.F. : 8° Lm1. 164
- Jules Villain, La France moderne, tome : 3, B.n.F. : 4° Lm1. 180
- Le Père Anselme, Histoire de la maison royale de France et des grands officiers de la couronne, 3e éd. Paris, 1726–1733, 9 vol. in-fol, tome : 6, B.n.F. : Fol. Lm3. 398.
- Marquis d’Aubais, Pièces fugitives pour servir à l’histoire de France, Paris, 1759, 2 vol. in-4 (t. I, 2e partie, et t. II), tome : 2, B.n.F. : 4° L46. 11,
- Waroquier de Combles, État de la France, ou les vrais marquis, comtes..., Paris, 1783–1785, 2 vol. in-12, tome : 2, 168-9, B.n.F. : 8° Lm1. 34
- Waroquier de Combles, Tableau généalogique et historique de la noblesse, Paris, 1786–1789, 9 vol. in-12, tome : 5, B.n.F. : 8° Lm1. 38

Political offices
Preceded by Claude Antoine Valdec de Lessart	Minister of the Navy and the Colonies; 7 October 1791 – 16 March 1792	Succeeded by Jean de Lacoste
