= Victor Scipion Charles Auguste de La Garde de Chambonas =

French foreign minister, brigadier general and mayor

Victor Scipion Charles Auguste de La Garde,
- marquis de Chambonas
- Born: 15 May 1750; Chambonas, Ardèche, France
- Died: 30 July 1830 (aged 80); Paris, France
- Spouse: Aglaé de Lespinasse
- Father: Scipion-Louis-Joseph de La Garde de Chambonas
- Occupation: Military, politics

Victor Scipion Charles Auguste de La Garde de Chambonas (15 May 1750–1830) was a mayor of Sens, brigadier general, and French foreign minister, at the beginning of the French Revolution.

He was born in Les Vans, the son of Scipion Louis Joseph de La Garde, Marquis de Chambonas (1765) and of Louise Victoire Grimoard de Beauvoir du Roure. He married Josephine Louise Aurélie Aglaé Aimée de Lespinasse (1756–1788) on 4 May 1774 in Paris; they had a son, Adolphe Aimé Charles (1778–1860).

He was Minister of Foreign Affairs from 17 June to 23 July 1792 in the Government of Louis XVI. After 10 August 1792, he emigrated to London where he worked as a goldsmith, was sued for debts and sent to a debtors' prison. He returned to France in 1814 and died in Paris in 1830.

Political offices
Preceded by Pierre Paul de Méredieu, baron de Naillac	Minister of Foreign Affairs; 18 June 1792 - 23 July 1792	Succeeded by François Joseph de Gratet, vicomte Dubouchage
