= Jean de Lacoste =

Jean de Lacoste (1730–1820) was a lawyer in the parliament of Bordeaux who became chief clerk of the Navy, on the eve of the Revolution.

Lacoste was born in Dax in 1730. He was sent to the Caribbean to retain control for the new colonial regime. He was Minister of the Navy from 15 March 1792 to 10 July 1792. He was indicted by the court's criminal department, which acquitted him. After the coup of 18 Brumaire Year VIII (9 November 1799), he was appointed member of the council and retained office until the abolition of it in 1814. Lacoste died in 1820.

Political offices
Preceded by Antoine-François Bertrand de Molleville	Minister of the Navy and the Colonies; 16 March 1792 – 21 July 1792	Succeeded by François Joseph de Gratet, vicomte Dubouchage
