= François Joseph de Gratet, vicomte Dubouchage =

French politician (1749–1821)

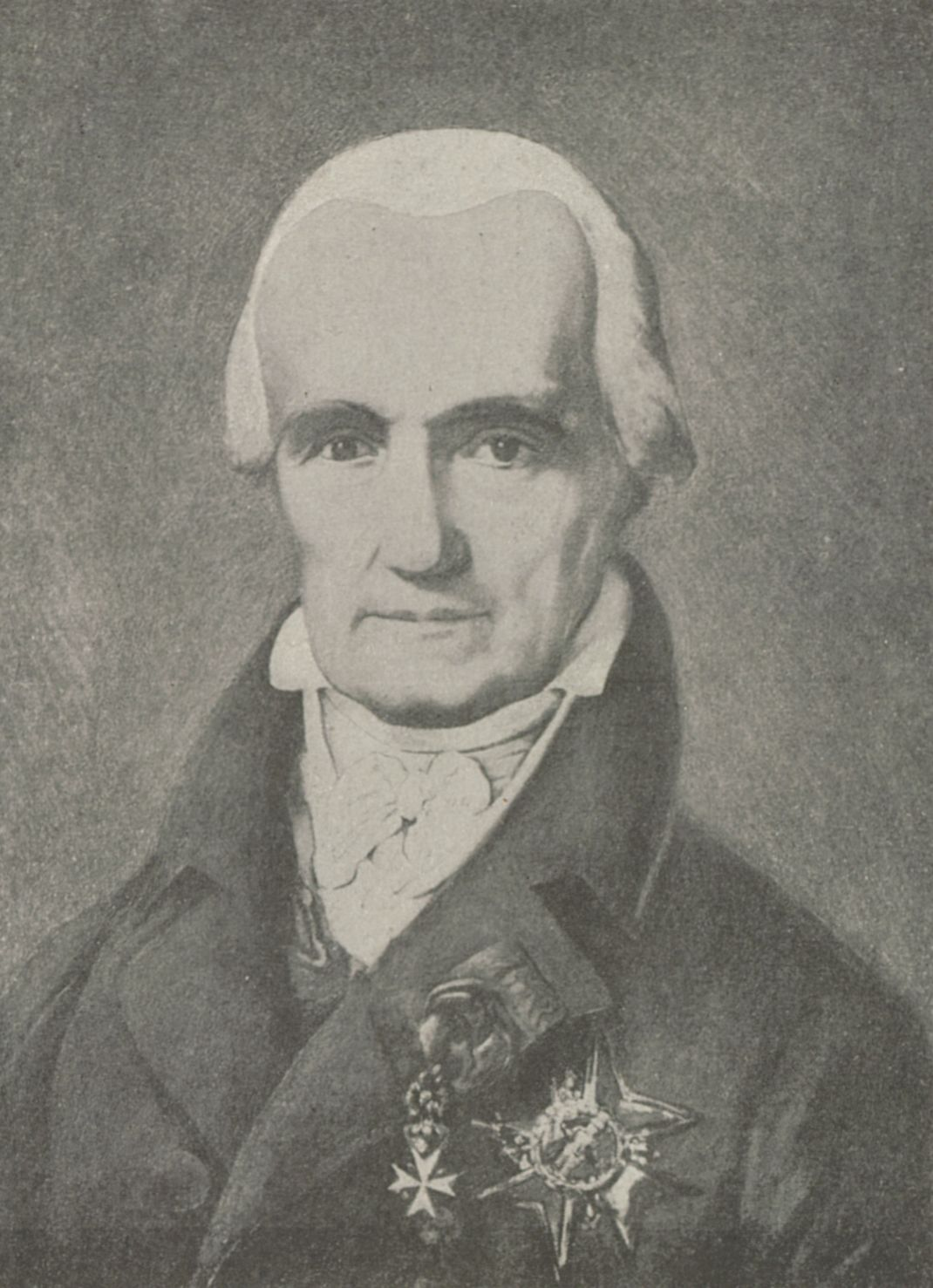
Gratet du Bouchage (Dépêche coloniale illustrée, 1902-05-15)

François Joseph de Gratet, vicomte du Bouchage (1 April 1749, Grenoble – 12 April 1821), was a French artillery general, politician, and French Minister of Marine in 1792 and 1815, and Minister of Foreign Affairs 1792.

== Biography ==
Born into a noble family of Bugey, established in Dauphiné since the sixteenth century, he was the fourth child of Claude-Francois de Gratet, vicomte du Bouchage, barrister and honorary knight in Parliament of the Dauphiné.

Like his brother Marie-Joseph, he embraced a military career by entering in 1763, at the age of fourteen years, in the artillery of France. Brilliant officer, he was appointed brigadier on 1 November 1784 during the creation of the corps of Colonial Royal Artillery. As a result, he spent in the Navy, he never left.

Two years later, on 1 May 1786, he was Deputy Director at Brest, naval artillery. Became a Director at the beginning of the revolution in 1791; he published a paper on the organization of the Marines which inspired legislators in their decree of June 14, 1792.

Field Marshal and Inspector General of Artillery July 8, 1792, he accepted the portfolio Minister of the Navy after the dismissal of Roland, then as Minister of Foreign Affairs.

Dismissed August 10 as anti-revolutionary. He advised Louis XVI in resistance, the prince chose to retire from the Assembly. He accompanied him there on his arm to the Queen and Madame taking by the hand. On August 13 he left Paris, but he did not emigrate. He was arrested a few days in 1805, on suspicion of having intercourse with London.

Appointed Commander of St. Louis in 1814, he remained inactive during the Hundred Days. Minister of the Navy September 27, 1815, he conceived the idea of establishing a naval school in Angoulême; he restored the Naval establishment of the Invalides. He opposed the order of September 5, and surrendered his portfolio, June 22, 1817. He was made a peer of France on June 23, 1817.

Political offices
Preceded by Scipion Victor, marquis de Chambonas	Minister of Foreign Affairs; 23 July 1792 – 1 August 1792	Succeeded by Claude Bigot de Sainte-Croix
Preceded by Jean de Lacoste	Minister of the Navy and the Colonies; 21 July 1792 – 10 August 1792	Succeeded by Gaspard Monge
Preceded by François Arnail, comte de Jaucourt	Minister of the Navy and the Colonies; 26 September 1815 – 23 June 1817	Succeeded by Laurent, Marquis de Gouvion Saint-Cyr
