= Berrias-et-Casteljau =

- Commune
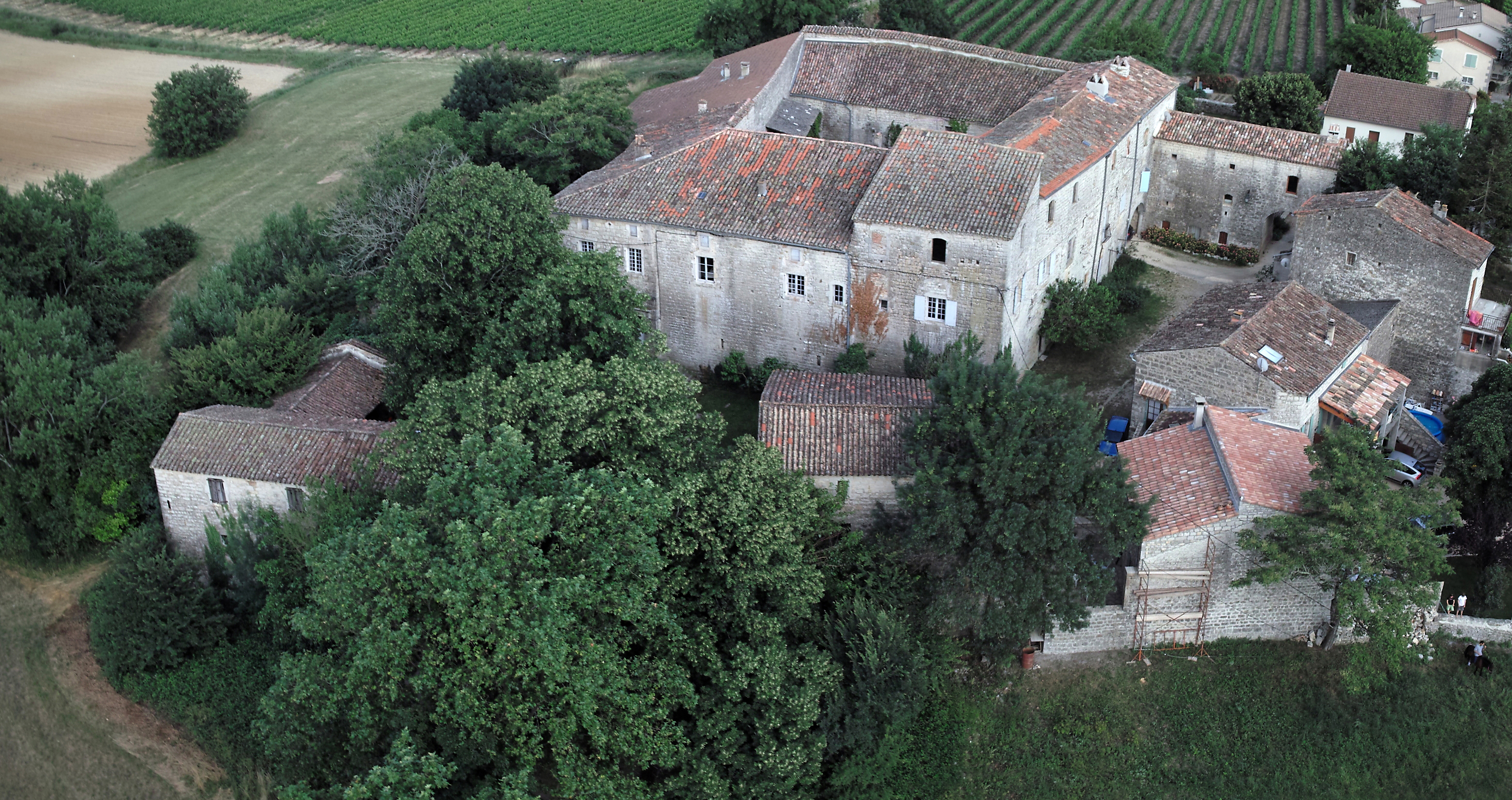
- Commandery of Jalès

- Coat of arms
- Location of Berrias-et-Casteljau
- Location within France Location within Auvergne-Rhône-Alpes
- Coordinates: 44°22′33″N 4°12′04″E
- Country: France
- Region: Auvergne-Rhône-Alpes
- Department: Ardèche
- Arrondissement: Largentière
- Canton: Les Cévennes ardéchoises

Government
  - Mayor (2020–2026): Robert Balmelle
- Area^{1}: 26.42 km^{2} (10.20 sq mi)
- Elevation: 130 m (430 ft)
- Highest elevation: 262 m (860 ft)
- Lowest elevation: 100 m (330 ft)
- Population (2023): 793
  - Density: 30.0/km^{2} (77.7/sq mi)
- Time zone: UTC+01:00 (CET)
  - Summer (DST): UTC+02:00 (CEST)
- INSEE/Postal code: 07031 /07460
- ^{1} French Land Register data, which excludes lakes, ponds, glaciers > 1 km^{2} (0.386 sq mi or 247 acres) and river estuaries.

Berrias-et-Casteljau (French pronunciation: [bɛʁjas e kastɛlʒo]; Occitan: Berriàs e Castèljau) is a commune in the Ardèche department in southern France.

== Geography ==
The Chassezac flows southeast through the northern part of the commune, then forms part of its eastern border.

The Berriasian Age of the Cretaceous Period of geological time is named for the village of Berrias in the commune.

== Population ==
Historical population
Year	Pop.	±% p.a.
1968	622	—
1975	614	−0.18%
1982	536	−1.92%
1990	541	+0.12%
1999	566	+0.50%
2007	602	+0.77%
2012	706	+3.24%
2017	762	+1.54%
2023	793	+0.67%
Source: INSEE

== See also ==
- Communes of the Ardèche department
