= Chassezac =

River in southern France

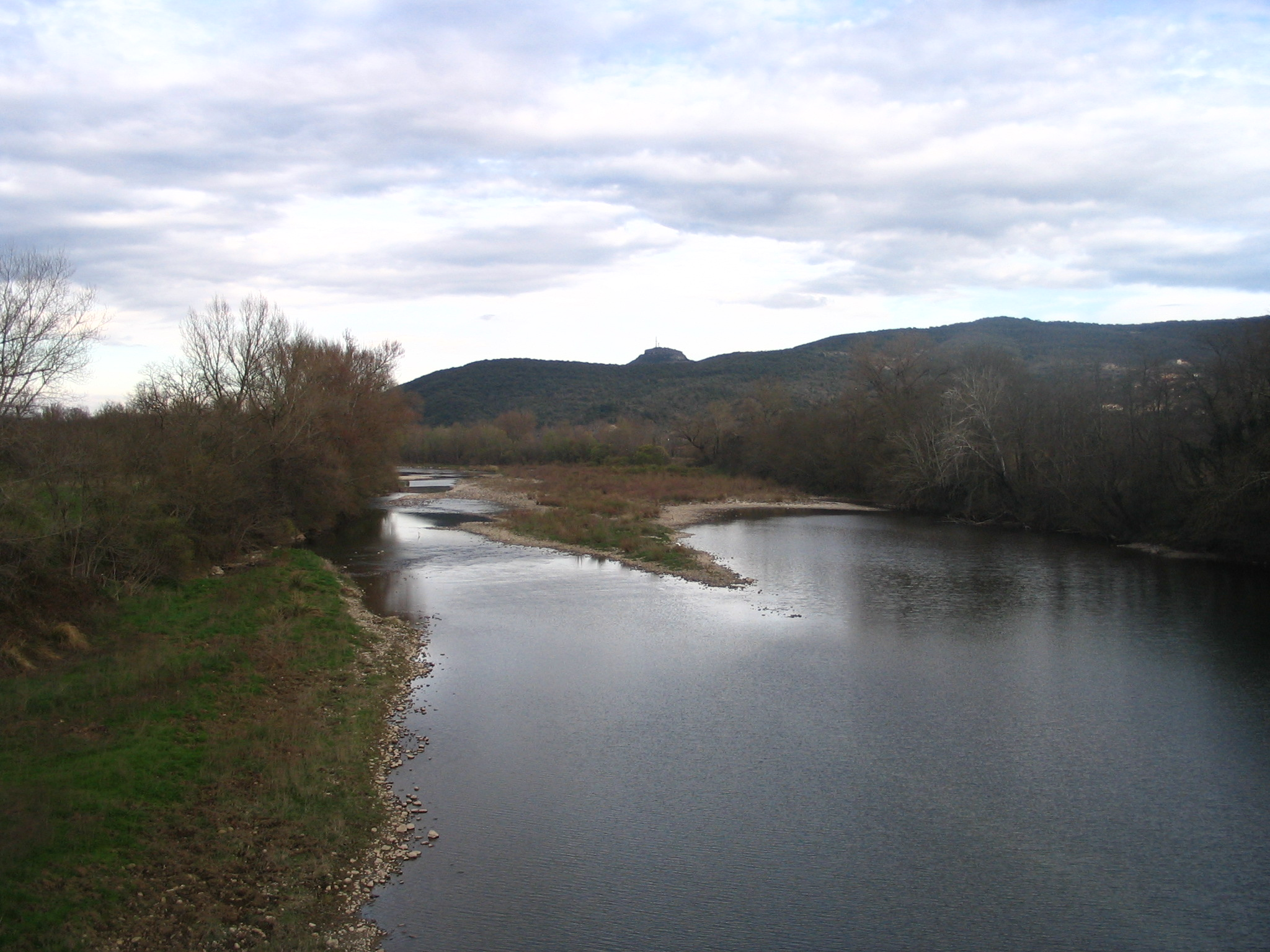
- The Chassezac

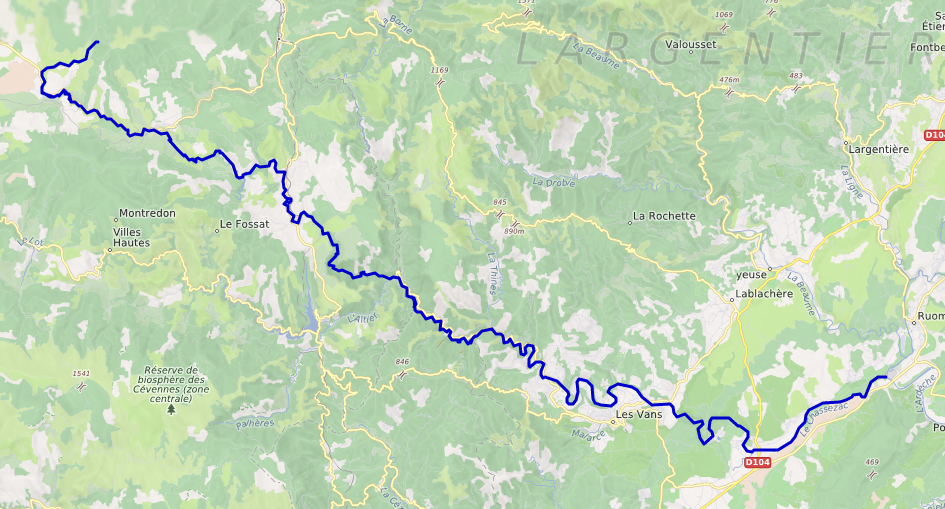

Location
- Country: France

Physical characteristics
- Source
  - location: in Saint-Frézal-d'Albuges
  - coordinates: 44°35′30″N 03°46′47″E
  - elevation: 1,350 m (4,430 ft)
- Mouth
  - location: Ardèche
  - coordinates: 44°25′39″N 04°19′12″E
  - elevation: 95 m (312 ft)
- Length: 84.6 km (52.6 mi)
- Basin size: 560 km^{2} (220 sq mi)
- Discharge
  - average: 15.3 m^{3}/s (540 cu ft/s)

Basin features
- Progression: Ardèche→ Rhône→ Mediterranean Sea

The Chassezac (French pronunciation: [ʃaszak]; Occitan: Chassesac) is an 84.6 km (52.6 mi) long river in the Lozère, Gard and Ardèche departments in southern France. It is a right tributary of the Ardèche. Its source is in the commune of Saint-Frézal-d'Albuges, 2.8 km (1.7 mi) northeast of Les Chazeaux, the main hamlet in the commune. It flows generally southeast and flows into the Ardèche at Saint-Alban-Auriolles, 1.8 km (1.1 mi) east of the village itself.

== Departments and communes it runs through ==
The following list is ordered from source to mouth :

- Lozère: Saint-Frézal-d'Albuges, Belvezet, Chasseradès, La Bastide-Puylaurent, Prévenchères, Pied-de-Borne
- Ardèche: Sainte-Marguerite-Lafigère,
- Gard: Malons-et-Elze
- Ardèche: Malarce-sur-la-Thines, Gravières, Les Salelles, Chambonas, Les Assions, Les Vans, Berrias-et-Casteljau, Chandolas, Beaulieu, Grospierres, Sampzon, Saint-Alban-Auriolles,
