= Claude Antoine de Valdec de Lessart =

French politician (1741–1792)

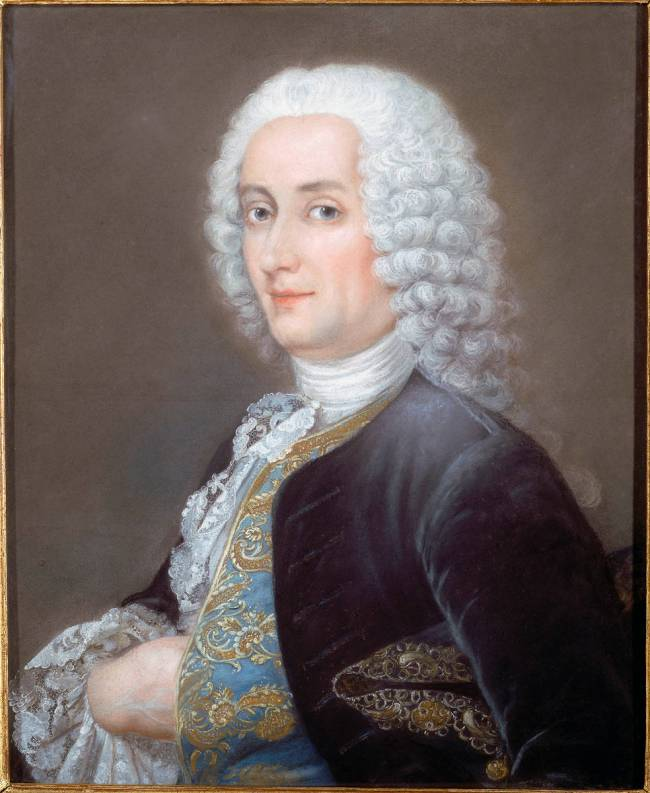
Lessart

Antoine Claude Nicolas Valdec de Lessart (French pronunciation: [ɑ̃twan klod nikɔla valdɛk də lɛsaʁ]; 25 January 1741, Château de Mongenan, Portets, near Bordeaux – 9 September 1792, Versailles ) was a French politician. He was the illegitimate son of the Baron de Gasq, Président of the Parlement de Guyenne.

== Life ==
=== Before 1790 ===
A director of the Compagnie des Indes, he became Maître des requêtes in 1767 then in October 1788 one of the three commissaries charged with discussing and examining everything on the financial administration. Claude Antoine Valdec de Lessart was one of the intimates of Jacques Necker. Louis XVI made him one of the commissaries charged with reconciling the three orders of the Estates General.

=== Revolution ===
On 4 December 1790, he was summoned to the Contrôle général des finances, then on 25 January 1791 moved to the Interior Minister, all the while holding onto the finance portfolio. At the Financial ministry, Étienne Clavière and the Girondins preyed on his management of the post, whilst at the interior ministry Camille Desmoulins, Louis-Marie Stanislas Fréron and Jean-Paul Marat reproached his sympathies for the refractory clergy. During the Varennes affair, he revealed himself as a docile executor of the orders of the Legislative Assembly. He was then made interim Naval Minister in September 1791 and interim Minister of Foreign Affairs that October when the main concern was the bellicose activities of the emigres based in Trier and Mainz. The threat to go to war with their hosts, the Rheinish Electors, sufficed to have the émigré armies ordered to disband. However, that December the emperor of Austria announced Austrian troops would support the Rheinish electors and war with Austria became a real possibility. That possibility was welcomed by the Assembly and de Lessart could do little to prevent it (He did send Talleyrand to London in January 1792 to seek English neutrality if not support). The Assembly resented de Lessart's cautious - some said treasonable - approach and on 1 March voted to have him impeached.

Unpopular and unable to arrest the march to war desired by Jacques Pierre Brissot, he was indicted under Girondin pressure on 10 March 1792. He was transferred to the High Court at Orléans and after 10 August 1792 the trial of prisoners by the Revolutionary Tribunal of Paris was decided upon. Claude Fournier-L'Héritier was charged with bringing them as far as Paris, but instead stopped at Versailles and massacred 44 of the 52 prisoners entrusted to him, including Louis Hercule Timoléon de Cossé-Brissac, Claude Antoine de Valdec de Lessart and Charles-Xavier Franqueville d'Abancourt.

== See also ==
- 9 September massacres

Political offices
| Preceded by Antoine-Jean-Marie Thévenard | Minister of the Navy and the Colonies; 18 September – 7 October 1791 | Succeeded by Antoine-François Bertrand de Molleville |
