= Chambonas =

- Commune
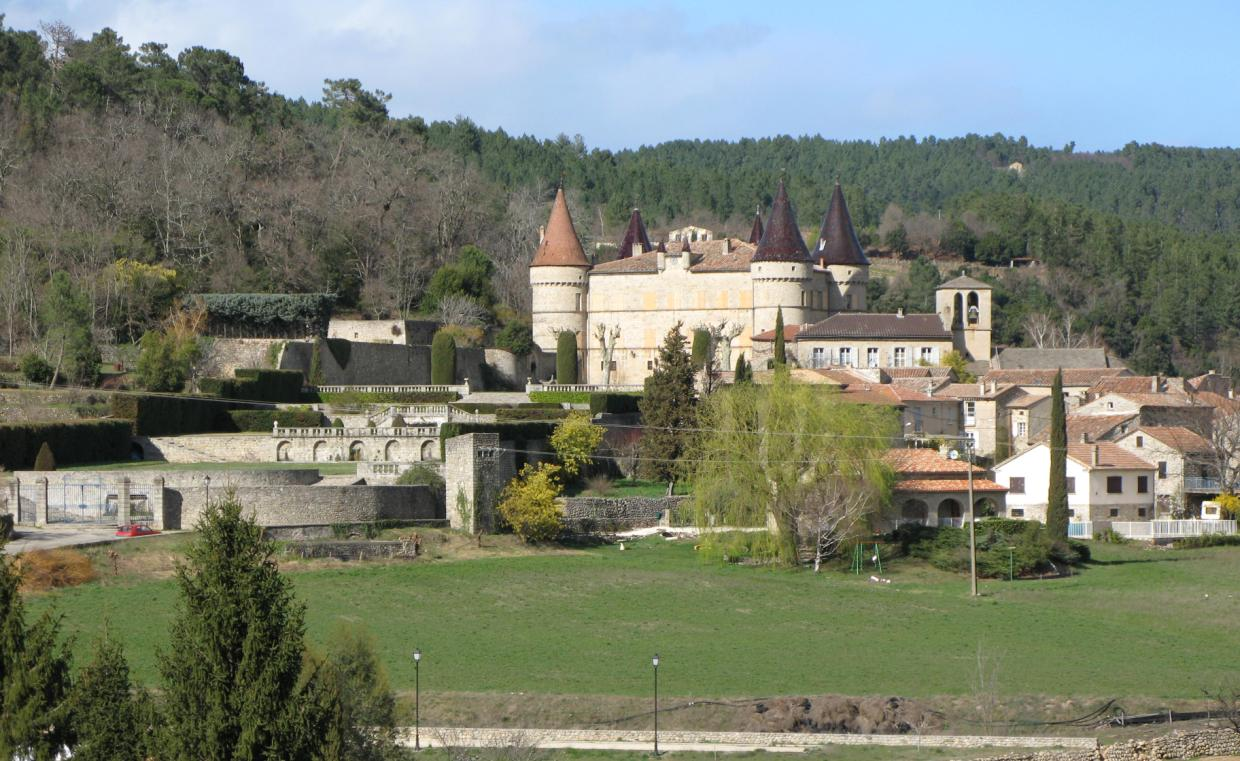
- A general view of Chambonas

- Coat of arms
- Location of Chambonas
- Location within France Location within Auvergne-Rhône-Alpes
- Coordinates: 44°25′05″N 4°07′46″E
- Country: France
- Region: Auvergne-Rhône-Alpes
- Department: Ardèche
- Arrondissement: Largentière
- Canton: Les Cévennes ardéchoises
- Intercommunality: Pays des Vans en Cévennes

Government
  - Mayor (2020–2026): Bérengère Bastide
- Area^{1}: 12.08 km^{2} (4.66 sq mi)
- Elevation: 110 m (360 ft)
- Highest elevation: 409 m (1,342 ft)
- Lowest elevation: 121 m (397 ft)
- Population (2023): 992
  - Density: 82.1/km^{2} (213/sq mi)
- Time zone: UTC+01:00 (CET)
  - Summer (DST): UTC+02:00 (CEST)
- INSEE/Postal code: 07050 /07140
- ^{1} French Land Register data, which excludes lakes, ponds, glaciers > 1 km^{2} (0.386 sq mi or 247 acres) and river estuaries.

Chambonas (French pronunciation: [ʃɑ̃bɔnas]) is a commune in the Ardèche department in southern France.

== Geography ==
The commune is traversed by the river Chassezac.

== Population ==
Historical population

Year	Pop.	±% p.a.
1793	1,202	—
1800	718	−7.10%
1806	1,091	+7.22%
1821	1,055	−0.22%
1831	1,286	+2.00%
1836	1,322	+0.55%
1841	1,327	+0.08%
1846	1,350	+0.34%
1851	1,204	−2.26%
1856	1,249	+0.74%
1861	1,152	−1.60%
1866	1,127	−0.44%
1872	1,099	−0.42%
1876	1,071	−0.64%
1881	1,012	−1.13%
1886	981	−0.62%
1891	1,000	+0.38%
1896	892	−2.26%
1901	922	+0.66%

Year	Pop.	±% p.a.
1906	866	−1.25%
1911	861	−0.12%
1921	748	−1.40%
1926	767	+0.50%
1931	749	−0.47%
1936	649	−2.83%
1946	660	+0.17%
1954	595	−1.29%
1962	605	+0.21%
1968	605	+0.00%
1975	566	−0.95%
1982	520	−1.20%
1990	552	+0.75%
1999	555	+0.06%
2007	600	+0.98%
2012	652	+1.68%
2017	905	+6.78%
2023	992	+1.54%

Source: EHESS and INSEE (1968-2023)

== See also ==
- Communes of the Ardèche department
