= List of wolf attacks =

This is a list of some significant wolf attacks on humans worldwide, by decade and century, in reverse chronological order. The symbol † in the column "Type of attack" indicates a fatal attack.

== 2020s ==
Date	Victim	Type of attack	Type of wolf (Number)	Location — Circumstances
October 28, 2026	Child, 8, female	Unknown	Captive (1)	Germany, Baruth/Mark — The girl was inside the enclosure at the zoo Wildpark Johannismühle to feed the wolves together with a staff member and two other children. She was attacked by at least one animal, suffering head injuries, and was taken to hospital by helicopter, while the zoo was temporarily closed.
March 30, 2026	Adult, 65, female	Defensive	Wild (1)	Germany, Hamburg-Altona — A 65 year old woman was knocked down and accidentally scratched in the face by a young wolf that during dispersion got stuck in a shopping center. She was attacked while she tried to guide it out of the building, mistaking it for a dog. The wounds were not life-threatening, and the woman left the hospital that same day. The animal was later captured and brought to a wildlife enclosure, and soon after released into the wild with a transmitter. Initial reports mentioned that the woman was bitten in the face, which witnesses and animal experts later disproved.
July 9, 2025	Child, 6, male	Unprovoked	Wild (1), GW2337m, “Bram”	Netherlands, at the monument Pyramid of Austerlitz near Austerlitz at the Utrecht Hill Ridge — A 6 year old boy was playing in the woods, whilst his parents were visiting the monument. The wolf attacked the child and tried to drag it into the woods. Nearby visitors saved the child by hitting the wolf with sticks, until it let go of the child. The boy suffered bite wounds and abrasions on his back and under his armpits. He was brought to Utrecht Hospitals and treated for skin and flesh wounds.
April 13, 2025	Adult female	Unprovoked	Wild (1)	Netherlands, Hoge Veluwe — The wolf bit a female runner twice in her upper leg before being scared off by bystanders. Her injuries were treated in hospital. On May 16, a judge decided that the government was allowed to kill the wolf.
February 13, 2025	3 Adults	Unknown	Wild	Iran, West Azerbaijan Province, Salmas County, Deshvan — Three people were hospitalized for injuries after a wolf attack in the village.
September 10, 2024	Child, 4	Predatory	Wild (1)	Italy, Parco delle Sabine (a city garden in Porta di Roma - Rome) — A wolf threw a child to the ground and tried to drag it away. Several young people nearby managed to snatch the prey from the wolf and scare it away. The child was treated in hospital. The wolf was later caught and released into an enclosure at the Parco Nazionale Abruzzo Lazio and Molise.
September 7, 2024	Adult, 49, male	Predatory	Wild (1)	Italy, Province of Chieti, Casalbordino — A man, who was on the beach with his wife and children, was attacked by a wolf and bitten in the knee. He was able to slowly retreat from the attacker, protecting his family. His wound was treated in hospital.
March- September 2024	10 people including nine children and an adult female	† Predatory	Wild (6)	India, Bahraich, Uttar Pradesh — A series of wolf attacks occurred between March and September 2024, which were suspected to be carried out by a pack of six wolves. At least ten people have been killed with more than 30 people injured in the suspected attacks by these wolves. Five of the wolves suspected to be behind the attacks were captured. Further information: Bahraich wolf attacks
August 19, 2024	2 adults	Unknown	Wild (1)	Alaska, Coldfoot – Two motorists stopped at a construction zone at Mile 37 on the Dalton Highway were bitten on their lower extremities while outside of their vehicle. The wolf had been seen previously at this stop, and had seemingly been fed by motorists before. The wolf was shot at by another motorist and ran off.
August 16, 2024	Leonardo, 13, male	Unprovoked	Wild (1)	Italy, Province of Savona, Finale Ligure — At around 9:40 p.m. A wolf attacked Leonardo on a campsite as he was on his way to the washing places. He recorded the attack on his mobile phone. Thanks to the intervention of other people, the injuries were minor.
July 16, 2024	Child, female	Unprovoked	Wild (1)	Netherlands, Utrecht, Leusden — A girl was attacked in the Den Treek nature reserve in Leusden. A week earlier, a dog was dragged away by a wolf in the same area. There was no evidence the girl was bitten.
June 23, 2024	Adult, 37, female	Unknown	Captive Arctic wolf (3)	France, Yvelines — A woman was attacked at the Thoiry Zoo. The victim stayed at a lodge in the park near the animals and was about to go jogging. She entered an area reserved for vehicles only and was attacked by three wolves.
January 23, 2024	Natalia †, 60, female; 3 people	† Predatory	Wild (1)	Russia, Petukhovsky — A wolf entered the Bear Lake Resort and attacked four people, one was taken to the hospital but did not survive her injuries.
December 5, 2023	8 People	Rabid	Wild	Iran, Zeberkhan Rural District, Razavi Khorasan province — Eight people were hospitalized in Hakim Neyshabur Educational, Research and Treatment Center after a rabid wolf injured multiple people. The wolf was killed and diagnosed with rabies.
August 2, 2023	Child, 8, male	Provoked	Captive (1)	Germany, Celle — A boy was attacked at the now closed Filmtierpark Eschede by a male wolf Ranga. The victim took part in one of the park's "animal encounters". Although not being old enough to participate, the victim's grandfather asked if his 8-year-old grandson may participate together with him, which was permitted by the staff. According to the zoo's director, the boy startled when Ranga wanted to lick his face, raising both arms and turning to the left side. The wolf then bit him in the chest, the wound was treated in hospital. After this incident, the district prohibited the wolf encounters.
July 9, 2023	Farmer, male	Provoked	Wild (1)	Netherlands, Wapse Drenthe — A wolf had crawled under a fence and killed one of the farmer's sheep. The farmer tried to drive the wolf away with a pitchfork and a shovel, shouting loudly, but was then bitten on the arm, damaging his tendons. The man went to a hospital. Another sheep and a goat had to be put down because of injuries. This wolf was later shot dead by order of the mayor.
2022-23	15 people	Predatory	Wild	Italy, Province of Chieti, in the city of Vasto and surroundings — One or more wolves, one of which was later captured and was purebred and completely wild according to DNA analysis by ISPRA, attacked 15 people in 2022-23. 13 of them required hospital treatment, including two children.
January 17, 2022	Martino Raineri, male	Unprovoked	Wild (7)	Italy, Folgaria (Between Malga Seconda Posta and Forte Cherle) — Seven wolves killed a dog belonging to a man who was skiing at 4:00 pm. He tried to hide from the wolves who were eyeing him and called emergency help which arrived 30 minutes later. Only then did the wolves give up and leave.
2020	210 people	Various	Various	Russia — According to the reports of the Ministry of Natural Resources and Ecology, over 200 people were attacked by wolves on different occasions in Russia in 2020.

== 2010s ==
Date	Victim	Type of attack	Location — Circumstances
December 30, 2019	Timur Makhametov, 23, male	† Predatory	Kazakhstan, Ketpen Village, Uighur District, Almaty Region — A wolf attacked a young man who was getting water at night. He sustained severe wounds in the head and feet.
December 12, 2019	Unknown, adult, male	Rabid	Mongolia, Tariat District, Arkhangai Province — A wolf bit a shepherd's hand outside his home.
December 8, 2019	Vladislav Lomako, 56, male	Rabid	Belarus, Khotovo Village, Stowbtsy City, Stowbtsy District, Minsk Region — A wolf seriously injured a man at a bus stop near a forest.
November 22, 2019	Zinaida Kozlovskaya, adult, female	Rabid	Belarus, Syanno, Senno District, Vitebsk Region — A wolf bit a woman in the evening.
October 24, 2019	Petr Grishchenko and Sergei Budnik, adult males	Unknown	Belarus, Ruchaevka Village, Loevsky District, Gomel Region — A wolf attacked a man on his porch, then later attacked another villager.
October 7, 2019	Four adults, three males and a female	Unknown	Russia, Kayasula Village, Neftekumsky District, Stavropol Territory — A series of attacks over two days, in which four villagers were injured by three wolves.
September 14, 2019	Three adult residents, two males and a female	Rabid	Ukraine, Perevalnoye and Privolnoye Villages, Simferopol District — A wolf attacked a dog and its owner in a private courtyard, then later bit two men at a forest stream.
August 9, 2019	Matthew Rispoli, adult, male	Predatory	Canada, Rampart Creek Campground, Banff National Park, Alberta — An emaciated wolf bit a man while attempting to drag him from his tent.
August 4, 2019	Sonya Chernigova, 14, female	† Predatory	Russia, Yodva Village, Udorsky District, Komi Republic — An old wolf fatally mauled a girl in the evening.
July 24, 2019	Kaje Napira, adult, female	Unprovoked	Estonia, Tahko Village, Hiiumaa, West Estonian Archipelago — A wolf followed a woman's dog into her residence and bit her.
June 28, 2019	Fifteen people	Unknown	India, Kupwara district, Jammu and Kashmir — Over a week, at least four wolves attacked and injured at least 15 persons.
June 28, 2019	Ibrahim Islamov, 57, male; Mahira Mammadov, 57, female; Namig Bakirov, 15, male; Tural Mammadnabili, 15, male	Unknown	Azerbaijan, Khachmaz Village, Oghuz Rayon — Following a series of attacks on animals, a wolf injured four villagers.
June 25, 2019	Arlind Suma, 5, male	Predatory	Kosovo, Dimcë Village, Han i Elezit Municipality, Ferizaj District— A wolf severely injured a boy while attempting to drag him away.
June 16, 2019	Unknown, 4, female	† Predatory	Iran, Zinel Village, Bijar County, Kurdistan Province— According to the Bijar Environmental Protection Agency chief, a wolf killed a girl whose body was located some kilometers away.
March 19, 2019	Tariel Mikeladze, 24, male, and two women	Unknown	Georgia, Chivisubani Village, Tsalka District, Kvemo Kartli Province — A wolf attacked a woman in a yard, injuring her and two villagers who came to help.
March 12, 2019	Sergei Merzlyakov, 61, male; Sergei Solovyov, 54, male; Alex Pyak, 43, male; Ksenia Marco, 33, female	Rabid	Russia, Nizhnyaya Ilinovka Village, Mikhaylovsky District, Amur Oblast — Two wolves attacked, causing bite injuries to four villagers.
March 7, 2019	Amalbegim Tashrifbekova†, 83, female; Mastibegim Davandova†, 55, female	† Unprovoked	Tajikistan, Mdenkhor Village, Gorno-Badakhshan Autonomous Region — Two women were killed by a wolf pack in their yard.
March 5, 2019	Three people: an adult man and woman and a girl, 12	Unprovoked	Kazakhstan, Ashutasty Village, Kostanay Region — A wolf attacked and injured three people.
February 21, 2019	Resident, adult male	Rabid	Ukraine, Terebovlia District, Ternopil Region — A wolf attacked a dog owner following a series of attacks on dogs.
February 21, 2019	A. J. Khafir Nizami, adult male; Eisha, adult female; Rania Youssef Abdullah, 7, female; Essam Jaafar, 6, male; Mahmoud Atta Fakhry, 4, male	Unprovoked	Egypt, Agricultural Area, Nag Hammadi City, Qena Governorate, Upper Egypt — Five members of a family were injured in a wolf attack.
February 14, 2019	Eight adults: five men and three women	Predatory	India, Shimuldanga, Phukuria, Nedabohora, Jarulia Villages, Jhargram district, West Bengal — Several people were injured by a wolf.
January 26, 2019	Luda Vasilyevich, 54, female; Dmitry, 34, male, two other adults	Rabid	Belarus, Sloboda Village, Stowbtsy District, Minsk Region — Two adults were attacked while returning to their homes in the evening; the wolf was chased away and attacked two other people.
January 24, 2019	Prashant, 4, male; Jaswant, 2, male	Predatory	India, Kashipur Village, Sambhal District, Uttar Pradesh — While playing in a field, two boys were seriously injured and dragged by wolves until rescued by farmers.
January 22, 2019	Anita, 7, female	† Predatory	India, Alipur Village, Sambhal district, Uttar Pradesh — A girl was dragged away and killed, with only her skull recovered.
January 13, 2019	Adult male	Unprovoked	Ukraine, Osypenko, Zaporizhzhia Oblast — A woodcutter was attacked from behind by a wolf, sustaining minor injuries.
January 12, 2019	Three adults: two female and one male	Unprovoked	Ukraine, Osypenko, Zaporizhzhia Oblast — One woman was severely bitten in the head.
January 7, 2019	Lalit Hemam† and two others	† Unprovoked	India, Bulauka Village, Jamboni Block, Jhargram District, West Bengal — Three youth were attacked at a campfire, one fatally injured and two seriously injured.
January–April 2019	Three male residents, one adult and two children	Predatory	Tajikistan, Dashtak and Sipindz Villages, Shughnon District, Gorno Badakhshan Autonomous Region — A series of wolf attacks injured and killed people in the area.
December 30, 2018	Vikesh, 2, male	† Predatory	India, Hakimpur Village, Sambhal district, Uttar Pradesh — A boy was fatally attacked and taken away by wolves.
December 22, 2018	Five people	Unprovoked	Georgia, Partskhanakanibi Village, Tsqaltubo Municipality — Five people were attacked by wolves, including a dog walker at 2 am.
December 1, 2018	Zenoviy Lototsky, 67, male; Bogdan Kozyr, 46, male	Rabid	Ukraine, Bilyavintsy Village, Stary Petlikivtsi Village, Buchachsky Area, Ternopil Region — Two victims were attacked in two incidents.
December, 2018	Lalmohan Soren, 30, male	† Unprovoked	India, Jamboni, Jhargram district, West Bengal — A wolf fatally mauled a man's neck.
November 29, 2018	Four adults and three children	Rabid	Azerbaijan, Shuvi and Zangayash Village, Astara District — A wolf attacked children and adults on their way to school, then attacked others nearby.
November 28, 2018	Anar Rajabov, 16, male; Khalid Gunduz Abdullayev, male	Unprovoked	Azerbaijan, Biləsər Village, Lankaran Rayon — A teenager and a schoolboy were attacked and injured in the evening.
October 23, 2018	A. Kalys, 51, male; A. Abdujapar, 46, male; J. Altyn, 42, male; I. Makhmud, 41, female; K. Ruslan, 29	Rabid	Kyrgyzstan, Maydan and Uch-Korgon, Kadamjay District, Batken Region — Two wolves attacked domestic animals and five people in the morning.
October 17, 2018	Adult male	Provoked	Moldova, Khrustovaya Village, Kamensky District — A man was injured at night by a wolf while defending his dog.
October 5, 2018	Galina Matsepa, 59, female	Provoked	Ukraine, Shybalyn, Berezhany Raion, Ternopil Oblast — A woman was attacked and injured while trying to drive a wolf out of her yard.
September 15, 2018	Adult male	Predatory	Jordan, Anaba Town, Al-Mazār ash-Shamālī, Irbid Province — A citizen was attacked by a wolf in his home garden.
September 10, 2018	Vasil Mamaiashvili, 65, male; Giorgi Mchedlishvili, 60, male; Tinatin Kapanadze, adult female	Unknown	Georgia, Tibaani Village, Signagi District, Kakheti Region — A wolf attacked and injured a man sleeping on his balcony, then a woman and man waiting for a bus.
June 26, 2018	Two children	Unprovoked	Poland, Strzebowiska and Przysłup, both in Podkarpacie region — First an eight-year-old girl, then only two kilometers away a ten-year-old boy were attacked and injured while playing outside. This happened shortly after 18:35hrs, when he was seen by a car driver about 50 meters before the junction for Karczma Brzeziniak and a fish restaurant, when she drove towards Kalnica in Przysłup; she took a photograph (included in the newspaper article).
May 28, 2018	Lyova Suren Arzumanyan, 41, male; Kamo Carlsen Gasparyan†, 11, male; Tigran Khachatur Khamperyan, 10, male; Arina Margaryan†, 4, female	† Rabid	Artsakh, Mets Tagher and Tumi Communities, Hadrut Province — A wolf attacked four people, two of whom died of rabies infection.
April 14, 2018	None	Unprovoked	Russia, Ust-May Village, Ust-Maysky District, Yakutia — A man was attacked but unhurt by a wolf which he was able to trap in a boiler room.
February 20, 2018	Two people	Unprovoked	Iran, Kohangan Village, Semirom County, Isfahan Province —Two people suffered injuries in a wolf attack.
January 24, 2018	One resident	Predatory	Iraq, Ghannam Village, Dghara Area, Diwaniyah City, Qādisiyyah Governorate — One person was injured by a group of three wolves which attacked a village.
January 19, 2018	Lydia Vladimirovna, 70, female	Rabid	Ukraine, Omyt Village, Zarichne Raion, Rivne Region — A woman was attacked in her yard.
January 13, 2018	Four residents	Unprovoked	Iraq, Dghara Area, Diwaniya District, Al-Qadisiyyah Governorate — In the evening, four people were attacked and injured at a youth cafe.
January 4, 2018	Anna Lushchik, 63, female; Vladimir Kiryanov, 59, male; Lyubov Gerashchenko, 53, male; Lina Zaporozhets, 14 female	Unprovoked	Ukraine, A village in Korop Raion, Chernihiv Region — A wolf attacked and injured four people over the course of a night.
January 2, 2018	Two men	Unprovoked	Belarus, Komarin Village, Brahin District — A wolf bit a man at a bus station, and subsequently attacked another man at a petrol station.
December 11, 2017	Four residents	Unprovoked	Russia, Norilsk City, Krasnoyarsk Krai — Four people were bitten by a wolf which was hunting for dogs.
November 7, 2017	Mirbek Kelgenbaev, adult, male	Unprovoked	Kyrgyzstan, Sarychat-Ertash State Nature Reserve, Issyk-Kul Region — A man was attacked and injured by a wolf while attempting to repair an automotive breakdown.
October 14, 2017	Madi Utegenov, 13, male	Unprovoked	Kazakhstan, Taldykyduk Village, Kaztal District, West Kazakhstan Region — A boy was seriously injured by a wolf in a shed.
August 7, 2017	Khasrat Gurbanov, adult male; Fikret Aliyev, adult male	Predatory	Azerbaijan, Padar Village, Agsu District — Two men were attacked by wolves at night.
August 1, 2017	Adult woman	Unprovoked	Greece, Makrohori Village, Korestia, Kastoria Regional Unit, West Macedonia — An elderly woman was attacked and injured while feeding her sheep.
July 30, 2017	Resident, 70, male	† Predatory	Georgia, Vachnadziani Village, Gurjaani Municipality, Kakheti Region — An elderly man and his dogs were attacked and killed in a vineyard.
July 25, 2017	Alyeva Aida Abbas, 49, female	Predatory	Azerbaijan, Korhalfali Village, Agstafa District — A woman was bitten while attempting to defend livestock from a wolf.
July 24, 2017	Matin Bashiri, 3, male	† Predatory	Iran, Bashirabad Village, Kolyai District, Sonqor County, Kermanshah Province — A boy and his sister were attacked by a wolf, the boy carried away and fatally wounded.
July 20, 2017	Rajab Gadirov, 61, male	Predatory	Azerbaijan, Khidirli Village, Salyan District — A shepherd was severely injured by a wolf.
July 19, 2017	Mohammad Mammadov, 16, male; Bakhshish Asgarov, 19, male	Predatory	Azerbaijan, Ashtarak Zarbaktar Village, Zaqatala District — A young shepherd was injured by a wolf, which later badly injured a border patrol member.
July 7, 2017	Beekeeper, 60, male	Rabid	Russia, Vydel Farm, Tuzlov Hunting Farm Territory, Rodionovo-Nesvetaysky District, Rostov Region — A beekeeper was attacked from behind and injured. He sheltered in a metal booth which the wolf attacked for a time and damaged.
July 4, 2017	Two men and a woman	Unprovoked	Georgia, Tamishek Village, Sukhumi District, Abkhazia — A wolf injured a woman in an apartment courtyard, then bit two men in a neighboring yard.
July 1, 2017	Makhmadnazar, 3, male	† Predatory	Tajikistan, Imom Village, Shughnon District, GBAO — A wolf attacked three children who were playing after their dinner. It dragged away a boy, who died from severe injuries.
June 17, 2017	Resident, male	Provoked	Saudi Arabia, Wadi Niyat, Duqm al-'Owaid Village, Al-Liith — A man was injured by a wolf in a sheep barn.
June 13, 2017	Four adults, three children	Unprovoked	Iran, Ramin Village, Zanjan Province — Two wolves injured seven people.
June 10, 2017	Tahira Habulla, 48, female; Nazli Mammadaga, 45, female	Unprovoked	Azerbaijan, Shakerli Village, Salyan District — A wolf bit two women on their arms.
May–August 2017	Children	Predatory	Israel, Masada, Ein Gedi — Numerous wolf attacks causing injuries at campsites and tourist attractions.
May 6, 2017	Fatima Karami, 3, female	Predatory	Zarand Village, Aq Bolagh Rural District, Sojas Rud District, Khodabandeh County, Zanjan Province, Iran — A wolf took a girl from her family garden and carried her for 2 km (1.2 mi), inflicting injuries.
April 21, 2017	Bahram Seyidov, 29, male	Provoked	Azerbaijan, Gudula Village, Shaki District — A shepherd was injured while rescuing a lamb from five wolves.
April 18, 2017	Mohammad, 1, male	Predatory	Iran, Zawajar Village, Qeydar City, Khodabandeh County — A wolf carried a boy for 3 km (1.9 mi), inflicting injuries.
April 2, 2017	Sultan Hasanoğlu, 72, female; Mürteza Hasanoğlu, 71, male; Ali Hasanoğlu, 46, male; Birsen Hasanoğlu, 44, female	Rabid	Turkey, Yoğurtçular Village, Şenkaya District, Erzurum — Four people were injured while defending livestock.
March 15, 2017	Adult male	Predatory	Terek Village, Alai District, Osh Region, Kyrgyzstan — A wolf attacked a farmer in his barn.
February 21, 2017	Vusal Abbasov, 36, male	Predatory	Azerbaijan, Quycu Salyan Region — A man was attacked but uninjured while trying to chase away a wolf.
February 2017	Marcelo Vanzuita, adult male	Unknown	Whitehorse, Yukon, Canada — Followed by two wolves but not attacked or injured during the Yukon Arctic Ultra ultramarathon.
February 5, 2017	Three men	Rabid	Ukraine, Zaderiyivka Village, Chernihiv Oblast — Two off-duty border guards were injured while rescuing a severely injured man from a wolf attack.
February 5, 2017	Kadyrzhan Sharshenbek Louulu, 27, male	Predatory	Kyrgyzstan, Kalkagar Village, Tong District, Issyk-Kul Region — A man was attacked outside a livestock shed by a wolf from a pack which had previously attacked the livestock.
December 7, 2016	Adult males	Unprovoked	Smithers, British Columbia, and Mt Norquay, Alberta, Canada — Multiple reports of close approaches or stalking by wolves, but no reported attacks or injuries.
Winter 2016–17	Boy, 12	Predatory	Indian Himalayas — A wolf inflicted multiple injuries.
December 4, 2016	Two residents	Predatory	Iran, Susangerd, Dasht-e Azadegan County, Khuzestan Province — Two residents injured by wolves.
December 2, 2016	Oil worker, 44, male	Unprovoked	Kazakhstan, Beyneu District, Mangystau Region — A wolf attacked a worker, causing light injuries.
November 24, 2016	Sivam Kewat, infant, male	† Unknown	Sanjay National Park, Madhya Pradesh, India — A wolf fatally bit an infant.
November 8, 2016	Child, 11, male	Predatory	Kum-Döbö village, Kochkor district, Naryn oblast, Kyrgyz Republic — A boy was bitten by a wolf near his house.
November 7, 2016	Eleven children	Unknown	Iran, Sardrud, Tabriz (East Azerbaijan) — Wolves attacked and injured eleven children at evening play. They tried to carry away a 4-year-old boy who was rescued by an older brother, both receiving serious injuries.
November 4, 2016	Two adults, child†	† Unprovoked	Pakistan, Ghariza and Sepah Tehsil, Jamrud, Khyber Agency — A child was fatally injured and two others were injured.
November 1, 2016	Brent Woodland, 36, male	Unprovoked	Ucluelet, British Columbia, Canada — A man was followed by two wolves while jogging with his dogs.
November 7, 2016	Resident, 25 dead in own home. male	Unknown	Iran, Esfahlan, Tabriz, East Azerbaijan Province — A wolf injured a man near his house.
October 8, 2016	Andrew Morgan, 26, male	Predatory	Canmore, Alberta, Canada — A man was chased by a wolf on a forest trail.
August 29, 2016	Worker, 26, male	Unprovoked	Cigar Lake, Saskatchewan, Canada — A worker was mauled by a wolf outside a mining camp.
July 7, 2016	Alexander Chausov, 15, male; Ivan Golub, male; Vadim Golub, male; Valentine Golub, female	Rabid	Belarus, Pervomaisk, Rechytsa District, Gomel Region — A wolf injured four people and twenty pets.
June 8, 2016	Child, 7, female	Predatory	Iran, Omman Village, Qorveh-e Darjazin District, Razan County, Hamadan Province — A wolf injured and carried away a 7-year-old girl until pursuing rescuers caused it to flee.
June 8, 2016	Bülent Taşçı, adult, male	Unprovoked	Turkey, Günbatan, Posof District, Ardahan Province — A herder was injured by a wolf while tending to cattle.
May 31, 2016	Sahib Mamedov, 63, male	Predatory	Azerbaijan, Galynjag Village, Ismailli District — While defending sheep and cattle, a herder was seriously injured by a wolf.
April 22, 2016	Zlyva Hussein, adult female; Gōld Hussein, adult male; Sarab Ghazanfar, adult male; Adult male	Unprovoked	Iran, Kaveh, Delfan County, Lorestan Province — A wolf injured four adult residents, two of them in their house.
April 13, 2016	Aslan Shauhalovu, 35, male	Predatory	Russia, Dalakov village, Ingushetia — A wolf entered a yard where children were playing and bit a man.
April 2, 2016	Five people	Rabid	Iran, Jabdaraq village, Meshginshahr, Ardabil Province — A wolf killed livestock and dogs and severely injured five people.
March 25, 2016	A Couple with an infant	Rabid	Mongolia, 19th Khoroo, Sukhbaatar District — Two wolves attacked dogs and cows, then a man, woman and infant.
March, 21. 2016	Rosa Harutyunyan, 75, female	Unprovoked	Armenia, Khachik village, Vayots Dzor — A wolf seriously injured an elderly woman in her home.
March 20, 2016	Valiko Tagiashvili, 55, male	† Predatory	Georgia, Koshalkhevi Village, Dusheti District — A man was believed by a politician to have been attacked and eaten by wolves.
February 24, 2016	Two adults	Rabid	Russia, Yasyrev, Volgodonskoy District, Rostov Oblast, Southern Federal District, — A wolf injured a woman and later a dog and a man on a farm.
February 22, 2016	Seyed Hassan Mousavi, 30, male	Unprovoked	Iran, Qazvin Province — Wolves severely injured a cyclist in the mountains.
January 30, 2016	Shepherd, adult, male	Predatory	Macedonia, Batinci, Skopje — A wolf attacked sheep in a barn then seriously wounded a shepherd.
December 21, 2015	Bejshebaj Turgunbayev, 55, male; Kanykei Aktanbaeva, 29, female	Rabid?	Kyrgyzstan, Oruk Tam village, Naryn Oblast — Two wolves injured a man and a woman in separate attacks.
December 2, 2015	Musa uulu Taalaybek, male	unprovoked	Kyrgyzstan, Kadamjay District, Batken Region — Wolves hurt a dog owner.
November 30, 2015	Elchin Mamishov, male	Predatory	Mingachevir, Kalbajar District, Azerbaijan — A wolf injured a shepherd, and attacked those who came to rescue him.
November 29, 2015	6 People	Unprovoked	Iran, Lushan, Rudbar County, Gilan Province — Over two days, wolves injured six people, one severely.
October 26, 2015	Ilham Mammadov, 42, male; Padar Behramov, 34, male	Predatory	Azerbaijan, Novju Village, Agsu District — Wolves seriously injured two shepherds.
October 16, 2015	Resident, 55, female	Rabid	Turkey, Öğrendik Village, Ağın District, Elazığ Province — A wolf seriously injured a woman in her garden.
October 4, 2015	Three adult males	Rabid	Russia, Orechovka Village, Millerovo, Millerovsky District, Rostov Oblast — A wolf injured a man on a water tower, then injured two men in a nearby yard, with one seriously injured. It also bit dogs and livestock.
September 23, 2015	Matthew Nellessen, adult, male	Predatory	USA, Colburn, Wisconsin — Wolves attacked but did not injure a hunter, and retreated after one of the pack was shot.
July 31, 2015	Mahaneh Shams, 75, male	Predatory	Syria, Buqa'ta Village, Golan Heights — A wolf attacked and injured farmer in an orchard.
July 8, 2015	Abuzer Baydemir, adult, male	Predatory	Yarpuzlu Village, Sincik District, Adıyaman Province, Turkey — A wolf seriously injured a man in his garden.
July 6, 2015	Dhakira Ghasemi, 5, female; Abolfazl Rahimi, 4, male	Predatory	Iran, Razan County, Hamadan Province — A wolf or wolves injured two children in two separate attacks.
June 20, 2015	Mehmet Karasu, 70, male; Ali Yasar, 65, male	Predatory	Turkey, Bayındır, Mecitözü, Çorum Province — A wolf attacked people on their way to early morning prayer, injuring two.
June 9, 2015	Yamanurappa Basappa Mushigeri, 30, male; Sakrappa Hanumappa Itagi, 12, male	Predatory	India, Vadageri village, Ameengad — A wolf attacked and injured a shepherd and a young farmer.
May 9, 2015	Five people	Rabid	Nimrod Fortress National Park, Golan Heights, Israel — A wolf injured 5 people in 3 separate attacks.
April 26, 2015	Two adults	Unprovoked	Belarus, Strelichevo Village, Khoiniki District, Gomel Region — A wolf killed a dog outside a couple's home, then tried but failed to get inside.
April 7, 2015	Lima Ankudinova†, 77, female	Predatory	Russia, Borovitsa, Central Russia — A wolf killed and partially ate an elderly woman.
April 6, 2015	Six people	Predatory	Maysan Governorate, Iraq — A wolf pack attacked a village, injuring 6 people, some seriously.
March 24, 2015	Five people	Predatory	Chiva village, Vayots Dzor, Armenia — A wolf attacked and injured five farmers in a field.
March 7, 2015	Giorgi Gogiberidze, 23, male	Unprovoked	Georgia, Kvelobani Village, Chokhatauri District, Guria Region — A wolf injured a man who had attempted to chase it out of a yard.
January 25, 2015	Two families	Rabid	Outside Wabush, Labrador, Canada — A wolf charged snowmobilers on a trail, no injuries.
January 21, 2015	Three adults	Rabid	Belarus, Medvedev, Svietlahorsk District — A wolf injured three adults and a dog.
January 16, 2015	Amankhan Amirov, Ozat Kyrykbaev	Predatory	Kazakhstan, Jeldiqara village, Mynbulak rural district, East Kazakhstan Region — Wolves entered the village at night and injured two men.
January 14, 2015	Two adults†	Rabid	Kazakhstan, Zheldikar, Ayagoz District, East Kazakhstan Region — A wolf attacked two men, one of whom died from rabies.
January 2015	Ragif Mirzoyev†, 22, male	† Rabid	Azerbaijan, Chirchik District, Salyan Rayon — A wolf bit a man who was protecting sheep; the man died from rabies.
December 23, 2014	Man, 32	Predatory	Kyrgyzstan — A wolf attacked a dog then injured its owner outside a cattle fence.
December 20, 2014	Resident, adult, male	Predatory	Russia, Novokazicinsk, Zabaykalsky Krai, Siberian Federal District — A wolf attacked a resident.
December 10, 2014	Three adults	Predatory	Russia, Mikhailovka Village, Kamensky District, Rostov Oblast — A wolf entered a courtyard and bit a man and his dogs; while being chased away, it bit two women.
November 23, 2014	Bolot Zhunushaliev, teenager, male	Unprovoked	Kyrgyzstan, Ak-Muz Village, At-Bashy District — A wolf attacked a horse-riding teenager who was tending to livestock; no serious injury.
October 29, 2014	Şükran Aliyev, adult, male	Unprovoked	Azerbaijan, Mireshelli Village, Ağdam District — A wolf threatened a resident and exchanged injuries with a man who came to help.
October 27, 2014	Nurçiçək Yusif, 20, female; Əfsanə Yusif, 19, female; Vüsal Yusif, 16, male; Aygül Yusif, 11, female	Unknown	Azerbaijan, Jalilabad District — A wolf injured a girl in the family yard then injured three other family members who tried to save each other.
September 26, 2014	Dijana Kurtović, 33, female	Unprovoked	Croatia, Drnis, Šibenik-Knin County, Dalmatia — A wolf seriously injured a woman who was walking her dog.
September 26, 2014	Vinod, Yograj, Sewaram, Perkasha, Bablu, Savitri	Rabid	India, Hashampur Village, Muzaffarnagar district, Uttar Pradesh — The same wolf from the previous day's attack injured six field workers.
September 25, 2014	Khem Chand, Kamlesh, Rita, Baljore, Maksood	Rabid	India — A wolf injured five people.
August 26, 2014	6 adults: Abdurrahman Kara, 69, male; Ahmet Topçu, 50, male; Zehra Topçu, 45, female; Ali Topçu, 45, male; Ismet Topçu, 32, male; Kemal Keles, 40, male	Predatory	Turkey, Yıldızeli, Sivas — In three separate attacks, a wolf or wolves injured six adults, including two farmers attacked from behind and a family of four on a picnic.
August 13, 2014	Six villagers	Predatory	China, Kalazhuole village in Altay — In the early morning, 5 wolves attacked livestock in the village and subsequently injured 6 villagers, 2 seriously.
July 8, 2014	Nuriye Alacahan, 70, female; Gaziye Can, 38, female	Rabid	Turkey, Yenibardak, Gerger — A wolf seriously injured two women in a field.
June 3, 2014	Cuma Dalbudak, 53, male; Selahattin Öcal, 48, male	Predatory	Turkey, Küçükavşar, Delice, Kırıkkale — Wolves injured two shepherds.
April 21, 2014	Öner Kırdar, 36, male	Unprovoked	Turkey, Kapidag, Bandirma — A wolf seriously injured a man in the evening.
January 2014	Nikolai Mikhailov, adult, male	Rabid	Russia, Vasyukova Village, Bezhetsky District, Tver Oblast — A wolf seriously injured a man outside a shed before being shot by a hunter.
January 10, 2014	Resident, 74, female	Rabid	Romania, Mălureni, Argeș County, Southern Central — In the evening, a wolf injured a woman in her yard.
January 6, 2014	Ruslan Nuritdinov, 35, male	Rabid	Russia, Udachny, Mirninsky District, Sakha Republic — A wolf injured a man who was beginning a night shift.
January 3, 2014	Meryem Öztürk, 70, female; Elif Sevinç, 60, male; Baki Gündoğdu, 45, female; Mevlüt Yiğit, 26, male	Predatory	Turkey, Kederli Village, Ağaçören District, Aksaray Province — Wolves entered the village, injuring at least 4 people.
October 20, 2013	Eight people	Rabid	Nasirabad, Parikhan, and Hajjilu villages, Meshgin Shahr County, Ardabil Province, Iran — Over two days, wolves attacked people, dogs and livestock in three villages. Eight people were injured, one seriously.
October 17, 2013	Yura Arushanyan, male	Predatory	Armenia, Katnajur, Lori region — A wolf bit one resident, then gnawed on another man's door. The wolf severely injured this man when he and his brother came out to fight the wolf.
October 15, 2013	Michelle Prosser, adult, female	Predatory	Merritt, British Columbia, Canada — Wolves stalked a woman and her dogs on a forestry road, fatally injuring one dog.
October 10, 2013	Eight adults	Unprovoked	Iran, Eshtehard City, Karaj County, Alborz Province — In a series of attacks over the course of a night, a wolf injured eight people.
October 7, 2013	Zeki Cane, 74, male	Unprovoked	Turkey, Solhan, Bingöl Province — A wolf seriously injured a man who then killed the wolf with a rock.
September 5, 2013	Daulet Tuyeshiyev, adult, male	Predatory	Zhetybay Village, Karakiyansky District, Mangistau Region, Kazakhstan — A wolf attacked and seriously injured a police officer who was inspecting his car.
August 24, 2013	Noah Graham, 16, male	Unprovoked	USA, Near Lake Winnibigoshish, Minnesota — A wolf mauled a boy who was camping, inflicting serious injuries.
July 13, 2013	Adil Ahmad†, 9, male	Predatory	India, Kreeri area, Baramulla district, north of Srinagar — A wolf fatally bit a boy on the neck.
July 13, 2013	Aadil Hameed Sheikh†, 7, male	† Predatory	Kashmir, Hail village, northern Kashmir — Two wolves killed a boy.
July 6, 2013	William Hollan, adult, male	Unprovoked	Canada, Alaska Highway west of Watson Lake, Yukon — A wolf chased a bicyclist, ripping open the rear pannier bags before a motorist stopped to offer shelter from the attack. No injuries.
June 12, 2013	Mevlüt Özcanlı†, 80, male; Fikriye Pişkin, male; Cihan Erdoğan, female; Mustafa Savaş, male; Asiye Aktepe, female	† Unknown	Turkey, Hacılar village, near Tortum, Erzurum province — A wolf killed one man and injured four other people.
April 26, 2013	Feyzullah Aydin, male; Pınar Aydın, female; Gülgez Aydin, female; Kamile Aydin, female; Rukiye Aydin, female	Predatory	Turkey, Yemişen, Bulanık, Muş — Wolves attacked a dog in a family's garden, then subsequently injured all five members of the family who exited their home to rescue the dog and each other.
April 23, 2013	Vitaly Vanadze, adult, male	Predatory	Georgia, Laituri Village, Ozurgeti Municipality, Guria Province — Two wolves attacked a dog in a yard, then seriously injured the owner who tried to rescue it.
March 8, 2013	Dawn Hepp, adult, female	Predatory	Canada, Grand Rapids, Manitoba — A wolf attacked and injured a woman who had stopped to aid another motorist.
March 5, 2013	Ziya Kerdige, 55, male; Sercan Ceco, 30, male; Kamber Altun, 30, male	Predatory	Turkey, Esenyayla, Göle, Ardahan Province — Four wolves attacked two men and seriously injured a third who rescued them.
February 5, 2013	Woman†, 81	† Predatory	Tajikistan, Badzhuv Rushan — Multiple wolves inflicted fatal wounds on an elderly woman.
week of December 10, 2012	Lance Grangaard, 30, male	Rabid	USA, Ketchumstuk, near Tok, Alaska — A wolf attacked and superficially injured a man.
December 6, 2012	Muratbek Bakhtygali, 70, male; Aigul Espentayeva, female; Nazgul Adilgereyeva, female; Beket Shadmanov, male	Predatory	Kazakhstan, Algabas Village, Almaty Region — A wolf seriously injured an elderly man in his courtyard but fled when the man's cow charged it with its horns. The wolf then injured two women at the local kindergarten and a man who fought and killed it.
November, 2012	Aishat Maksudova, 56, female	Unknown	Russia, Makhachkala, Dagestan — A wolf seriously injured a woman who killed it with an axe.
October 15, 2012	Meryem Kara†, 60, female; İsmail Atmaca, male	† Rabid	Turkey, Yazıçayırı, Kulu, Konya — In separate attacks, a wolf killed a woman who was walking to an outhouse then injured a man in a neighboring village.
September 24, 2012	Abbas Mohammed†, 5, male	† Predatory	Iraq, Hilla — A wolf fatally wounded the youngest boy of a group of six who were picking berries.
September 2012	Man†, 60	† Rabid	Turkey — A wolf bit a man in his garden. The man strangled the wolf to death, but the man's later death was attributed to rabies.
August, 2012	Rukmanna†, 1, male	† Predatory	India, Belur village, Gulbarga — A wolf is presumed to have carried away and eaten a boy who was left sleeping under a tree.
July 10, 2012	Jefer Kartsivadze†, 60, male	† Predatory	Georgia, Zemo village, Shuakhevi District — A wolf or wolves are presumed to have killed a man.
July 2012	Stanislav†, 2, male	† Predatory	Ukraine, Berezino — A wolf or wolves are presumed to have attacked and eaten a boy who disappeared from a family gathering.
April 25, 2012	Zhagor Imangaliyev, adult, male	Unprovoked	Kazakhstan, Esensay Village, West Kazakhstan Region — A wolf injured a pensioner who tried to chase the animal out of his yard.
February, 2012	Varlam Butskhrikidze†, 65, male	† Predatory	Georgia, Vazisubani village, Telavi District, Kakheti — A wolf was confirmed to have attacked and severed the arm of a man who died from blood loss in his home.
June 17, 2012	Zoo employee†, 30, female; Arne Weise, 77, male; Visitor, male; Unknown, 15, female	† Predatory	Sweden, Kolmården Wildlife Park, near Norrköping — One or more wolves from a pack of eight zoo animals killed an employee who was acting under a policy of "social activities" with the animals. The pack had previously attacked three other people in separate incidents. The policy was discontinued following the death.
March 2012	Unknown†, 62, female; Unknown†	† Predatory	China, Tengzhou, Shandong — In a series of seven attacks over six days, a wolf or wolves fatally injured two people.
March 15, 2012	Surik Isayan, 22, male	Predatory	Armenia, Talvorik Village, Armavir Province — A wolf attacked a dog in a yard then severely injured the owner who tried to chase it away.
February 1, 2012	Grigory Gerasimovich, adult, male; Valentin Shevchuk, 42, male	Rabid	Belarus, Parokhonsk Village, Pinsk District, Brest Region — A wolf attacked and injured two men in the middle of the village at night.
January 5, 2012	Four adults, male	Unprovoked	Kazakhstan, Spataev Village, Saryagash District, South Kazakhstan Region — A wolf attacked a man who tried to chase the animal from his garden, injuring the man and three others who collectively killed it.
September 25, 2011	Rene Anderson, 55, female	Predatory	USA, 10 mi south of Pierce near Headquarters, Idaho — A wolf approached a hunter who shot it to death, no injuries.
June 24, 2011	Five pensioners, adults	Rabid	Belarus, Dvor-Savichi Village, Bragin District, Gomel Region — A wolf from the Polesie State Radioecological Reserve attacked residents and animals in the village, injuring five pensioners.
April 17, 2011	Adult and child	Unknown	Sweden, Rörmossen — Two wolves attack. One wolf attacks a woman with a child carriage, another wolf attacks their dog. The woman and the child escape uninjured, but the dog is killed.
April 14, 2011	Kezban Kartalmış, 79, female; Şerife Erkip†, 76, female	† Rabid	Turkey, Simav, Kütahya — In two separate attacks which occurred near grazing cattle, a wolf or wolves seriously injured one woman and fatally injured another.
January 31, 2011	Three men and; Asylhanov Mukhtarov, adult, female	Predatory	Kazakhstan, Zhanabulak village, Akzhaik District, West — A wolf injured three men then severely wounded a woman before being chased away. It later returned to the scene and was killed.
November 27, 2010	Karen Calisterio, 52, female	Stalking	USA, Between Tensed, Idaho and Plummer, Idaho — A pack of wolves briefly stalked a woman on her long rural driveway at dusk. No attack or injuries.
October 25, 2010	Three adults and a child	Predatory	Razan City, Hamadan Province, Iran — A wolf attacked and injured a mother and child, and attempted to carry away the child before chased by rescuers. The wolf subsequently injured two men.
October 29, 2010	Zhyldyz Bakasova, 29, female	Predatory	Kyrgyzstan, Cholok-Kayin Village, Ak-Talaa District, Naryn Region — A large wolf attacked and injured a woman who was defending her 4-year-old daughter in a yard.
September 27, 2010	10 People†	† Rabid	Russia, Chaditsa, Mogilevsky, and Vazhiya villages, Klimovsky District, Bryansk Oblast — In a series of attacks across three villages, a wolf fatally injured an elderly woman and injured nine others. Parties of more than 60 hunters tracked and killed the animal.
September 9, 2010	Ali Şahin, 66, male; Kıymet Şahin, 65, female; İsmet Bozkurt, male	Rabid?	Turkey, Doganpınar Village, Pülümür District — A wolf attacked a man who was in his yard washing laundry in the evening. The wolf seriously injured the man and his wife before rescuers arrived. The following morning, a wolf seriously injured a goatherd who was defending his livestock outside the village. A wolf was subsequently shot and killed.
March 8, 2010	Candice Berner†, 32, female	† Predatory	USA, Chignik, Alaska — A wolf or wolves attacked and killed a woman. This was the first such attack in North America confirmed by DNA evidence of culled wolves.

== 2000s ==
Date	Victim	Type of attack	Location — Circumstances
December 22, 2009	Ahmed Sabic, 25, male	Predatory	Croatia, Cista Velika, Imotski Region, Dalmatian Hinterland— Three wolves attacked a herd of cows and injured a shepherd who tried to defend them.
December 12, 2009	Man	Predatory	Finland, Pyhäjärvi, Liittoperä — A wolf attacked and lightly injured man who was repairing machinery in the forest.
November 27, 2009	Nikolay Musienko, 68, male	Rabid	Belarus, Vulka Gorodishchenskaya Village, Pinsk District, Brest Region — A wolf attacked and seriously injured an electrician outside a transformer substation.
September 10, 2009	Roderick Phillip, 35, male	Rabid	USA, Alaska, along the Kuskokwim River near Kalskag — A wolf attacked a hunter who had left his campsite.
February 20, 2009	One person, adult, female	† Predatory	Giorgitsminda, Kakheti, Georgia — A pack of wolves was believed to have killed a woman in one of a series of attacks over a month.
February 19, 2009	Vladimir Pashkov, 40, male; Alexei Suvorov, 56, male; Three others	† Rabies	Russia, Sikiyaz Village, Duvan District, Bashkortostan — A wolf fatally attacked a farm night watchman, and injured four others.
January 10, 2009	Kolya Nechaev, 10, male	† Predatory	Russia, Zavod-Kyn Village, Lysva District, Perm Krai — A wolf attacked a boy who was tobogganing and dragged him into a forest, inflicting fatal injuries. An expert stated that the animal was probably too old and weak to hunt proper prey.
February 11, 2008	Galina Solyanik, adult, female; Zoe Rybalko, adult, female; Adult female	Unprovoked	Ukraine, Bohoyavlenka, Donetsk Oblast — A wolf attacked and seriously injured three women in the early morning near a farm.
December 22, 2007	None	Predatory	Canada, Fort Nelson, British Columbia — Two wolves approached children who were tobogganing, and were attacked by a dog and later shot and killed. No human injuries.
December 20, 2007	Alycia Beiergrohslein, adult, female; Camas Barkemeyer, adult, female; adult, female	Predatory	USA, Artillery Road, Anchorage, Alaska — A pack of several wolves stalked three women jogging with their dogs on a forested road, attacking and injuring one dog.
September 2, 2007	Jouko Vuorma, adult, male	Provoked	Finland, Muhos — A female wolf chased a man for 300 metres (980 ft) after he had accidentally approached a wolf cub while picking berries. The wolf withdrew when the man began hitting it with a stick.
May 6, 2007	Adult female, 26	Captive	Germany, Hanover — While luring the animals into a building, one animal tried to bite the zookeeper in the leg. Another wolf then bit into her hand, severing a tendon. She was rushed into hospital immediately.
April 24, 2007	Bekbolat Amirkhanov, 50, male	Predatory	Kazakhstan, Kurmangazinsky District, Atyrau Region — A wolf attacked a shepherd who was grazing his sheep. The shepherd grabbed the wolf's tongue and reportedly held it for an hour, sustaining injuries to his hand while the wolf became exhausted and died.
July 7, 2006	Becky Wanamaker, 25, female	Predatory	USA, Dalton Highway near campground northwest of Fairbanks, Alaska — A wolf chased and attacked a woman walking on the highway, injuring her legs before she found shelter and assistance.
Winter 2005	Two people	Unknown	Afghanistan, Khost province — Occurred during what was considered the worst Afghan Winter in over a decade.
Winter 2005	Four people	†	Afghanistan, Naka, Paktia province — Two of the victims were killed during trips to other villages.
February 2005	Two people	†	Uzbekistan, Muinak district, western Uzbekistan —
January 5, 2005	Elderly Man	† Predatory	Iran, Village of Vali-Asr, near the town of Torbat Heydariya, Razavi Khorasan Province — Wolves attacked an elderly homeless man, inflicting fatal injuries despite attempts at rescue.
December 31, 2004	Fred Desjarlais, 55, male	Predatory	Canada, Key Lake, Saskatchewan — A wolf attacked and seriously injured a jogger, who was rescued by bus passengers. In response, authorities built an electric fence around a nearby landfill which was attracting predators.
November 28, 2004	Onur Bahar, 10, male	† Predatory	Turkey, Talas District, Kayseri Province, Central Anatolia — A pack of wolves approached a group of children who were playing one mile from their homes, chasing and killing the slowest of the group.
Winter 2003–04	Three people	Unknown	Russia, Astrakhan Oblast —
Winter 2003–04	Three shepherds	Unknown	Russia, Sredneakhtubinsky District —
February–August 2003	14 Children	† Predatory	India, Laliya, Auraiya, and Balrampur district, Uttar Pradesh — Wolves were believed responsible for the deaths of 14 children in a series of attacks.
July 2, 2000	Scott Langevin, 23, male	Predatory	Canada, Vargas Island Provincial Park, British Columbia — A wolf attacked a man sleeping outside at a campsite, inflicting serious injuries before other campers scared the animal away.
April 26, 2000	John Stenglein, 6, male	Predatory	USA, Logging camp at Icy Bay, Alaska —A wolf attacked and severely injured boy playing at the edge of a forest.

== 1900s ==
Date	Victim	Type of attack	Location	Circumstances	Refs
1996	Anand Kumar, 4, male	† Predatory	Banbirpur, India	A wolf attacked and carried away a boy, who was killed and eaten.	
August 1996	Zachariah Delventhal, 11, male	Predatory	Algonquin Provincial Park, Ontario, Canada	A wolf attacked and severely injured a boy who was sleeping outside with his family at a campsite. The family had earlier joined a group of Scouts in howling for wolves, which had been answered by a solitary wolf. Officials subsequently baited the campsite and a wolf was captured and destroyed.	
April 18, 1996	Patricia Wyman, 24, female	† Captive	Haliburton Forest, Ontario, Canada	A pack of wolves fatally mauled a new caretaker at a privately owned wildlife reserve. The wolves were killed the following day. Though they had been raised in captivity, they were never socialized with people.	
March 1996	60 children†	†	Uttar Pradesh, India	A pack of wolves killed around 60 children in Uttar Pradesh near the Ganges river basin over the course of 3–9 months.	
February 21, 1996	Michael Amosov, 60, male	† Predatory	Hamlet of Bolonitza, Zadrach, Belarus	Wolves were suspected in the presumed death of a man, whose footprints ended in bloody snow surrounded by wolf tracks.	
December 1995	Adult, female	† Predatory	Hvoschono, Belarus	A wolf or wolves were suspected in the death of a woodcutter, whose remains were found surrounded by wolf tracks.	
December 1995	Girl, nine	† Predatory	Usviatyda, Belarus	A wolf or wolves were suspected in the death of a girl whose body was surrounded by wolf tracks.	
October 1995	Adult female† and three men	† Rabid	Village south of Voronezh, Russia	A wolf fatally bit a woman in a cornfield, then bit three men in separate attacks.	
April 1993 – April 1995	60 children	Various	Hazaribagh, India	Five wolf packs were thought to be responsible for the attacks.	
1995	Unknown	† Predatory	Karelia, Russia	A fatal attack prompted a major hunt on wolves.	
1993	Unknown, adult, female	† Predatory	40 km from Tasmurinsky State Hunting Area, north of Almaty, Kazakhstan	Killed and partially eaten.	
June 3, 1989	Alyshia Berczyk, 3, female	† Captive	Forest Lake, Minnesota, US	A captive wolf slammed a girl into the ground, causing fatal liver damage.	
Late 1985 – January 1986	17 children	Predatory	Ashta, India	A pack of four wolves were believed responsible for attacks on 17 children, and were killed by hunters and forest officials.	
June 1982	Unknown, adult, female	Possibly rabid	Dubrova, Belarus	A wolf was believed responsible for an attack on a woman and previous attacks on people and livestock in three villages, and was killed by hunters.	
November 10, 1980	Vera Khrapovitskaya†, 23, female; Seruk Maria†, 58, female	† Rabid	Piskuni, Postavsky district, Russia	A wolf fatally mauled a woman who was defending her geese, and fatally injured a woman and injured a man who tried to intervene, before being killed by a crowd.	
1980	Unknown, elderly, female	Rabid	Estonia		
August 1979	Unknown, adult, female	Rabid	Sinezerka, Bryansk Oblast, Russia	A wolf bit a woman and attacked four other adults and a child.	
August 13, 1977	Unknown, 7, male	Predatory	Delmenhorst, Germany	A wolf escaped during transport to an animal park. After four days, the hungry animal attacked a boy.	
July 10, 1974	Javier Iglesias Balbin†, 3, male	† Predatory	Rante, Spain	A wolf carried off a boy, whose body was found in a nearby woodland. The wolf was killed with poison four days later, and was found to have a den with two pups, and a severe parasite infestation.	
July 4, 1974	Jose Tomas Martinez Perez†, 11 months, female	† Predatory	Rante, Spain	A wolf carried off a baby, dropping the fatally injured girl after being pursued.	
May 23, 1974	Unknown, 77, female	† Rabid	Arkadak, Saratov, Russia	A wolf fatally injured a woman and injured nine other people.	
February 3, 1973	Three people†	† Rabid	Aurangabad district, Bihar, India	A wolf attacked 12 people, three of whom died from head wounds.	
Autumn 1971	18 men	Rabid	Hindu Kush, Afghanistan	All 18 victims were attacked while guarding crops.	
1961	Unknown, adult, female	Rabid	Slovakia		
June 21, 1959	Manuel Sar Pazos, 4, male	Predatory	Tines village, Castrelo, Spain	A wolf bit a boy then chased his playmate, before being chased away by rescuers. Two wolves were subsequently killed.	
June 25, 1957	Luis Vasquez Perez, 5, male	† Predatory	Vilare village, Castrelo, Spain	A wolf attacked and killed a boy on a road, then chased a boy before being chased by adults.	
1956	Unknown, adult, male	† Predatory	Italy	Wolves killed and ate a postman outside of Rome.	
April 12, 1952	Lidia Tupitsyna, 6, female	† Predatory	Orichevsky District, Kirov Oblast, Russia	A wolf carried away a girl who was picking berries.	
1951–1953	Four children	Predatory	Oritji, Kirov Oblast, Russia		
April 29, 1951	Unknown, 10, female	† Predatory	Tarasovok, Orichevsky District, Kirov Oblast, Russia	A wolf killed a girl who was bathing with a friend in a creek.	
July–August 1950	Two boys and a girl, aged 3–6	Predatory	Lebyazhsky District, Kirov Oblast, Russia		
Reported in 1950	Three children†	† Predatory	Poltava Oblast, Ukraine	Multiple wolves killed three children.	
November 17, 1948	Svetlana Tueva, 8, female	† Predatory	Zykov, Nolinsky District, Kirov Oblast, Russia	Five wolves attacked a girl returning from school with friends, dragging her into a forest and presumably eating her.	
July–August 1948	Nine children, aged 7–12	Predatory	Darovskoy District, Kirov Oblast, Russia		
December 1947	Adult, female †; adolescent †	† Predatory	Kirov Oblast, Russia	An emaciated wolf killed two people near a railway station. The wolf had injured 13 people over the month, and was believed to have accustomed itself to scavenging human corpses during the war.	
1947	Veniamina Fokina, 13, female	Predatory	Rusanov, Khalturinsky District, Kirov Oblast, Russia		
1947	Anna Mikheeva, 16, female	† Predatory	Chernyabevij village, Rusanov, Khalturinsky District, Kirov Oblast, Russia	Wolves attacked a girl and her mother, dragging the girl's body into a forest where it was partially eaten.	
Summer 1946	14 children	Predatory	Kolchinsky, Malinsky and Savinsky localities, Kaluga Oblast, Russia		
July 14, 1946	One child	Predatory	Red Warrior settlement, Kaluga Oblast, Russia		
May 8, 1945	Pimma Molchanova, 5, female	† Predatory	Shilyavo, Nemsky District, Kirov Oblast, Russia	A wolf or wolves attacked a girl who was washing boots by a stream. A blood trail led to her partially eaten body.	
April 29, 1945	Maria Berdnikova, 17, female	Predatory	Golodaevshchina, Kirov Oblast, Russia	A wolf attacked a girl near a cattle yard and, despite attempts at rescue, dragged her into a forest.	
September 21, 1944	Valya Starikova, 13, female	† Predatory	Golodaevshchina, Kirov Oblast, Russia	A wolf or wolves carried a girl into a forest, where she was presumably eaten.	
Summer 1944	Adult, female †; girl, 7 †	† Predatory	Dubniaki, Mari El, Russia	Wolves attacked and killed a woman and her granddaughter who were picking berries in the Mari-Solinsky forest.	
1944–1950	22 people,† aged 3–17	† Predatory	Kirov, Kirov Oblast, Russia	See Kirov wolf attacks.	
1943	Inuk boy	† Rabid	near the Wainwright area in Alaska	A timber wolf bit a boy who died of rabies infection.	
1942	Inuk hunter, adult, male	† Rabid	near the Noorvik area in Alaska	A timber wolf bit a hunter who died from rabies infection.	
1940s	Unknown, 3, female	† Predatory	Kaluga Oblast, Russia	A wolf or wolves killed a girl who was picking flowers near Bytosh railway station.	
July–August, 1937	Five children	Predatory	Tymoszewicze and Hryniewicze villages, Belarus	Two wolves attacked five children in a series of daylight incidents near homes.	
Winter 1932	Unknown, 6, female	Predatory	Puumalan, Uikkaala, Finland	A wolf or wolves were presumed to have killed a girl who had disappeared.	
1924	Ten people	Rabid	Kirov, Kirov Oblast, Russia	Two rabid wolves killed one person, and bit ten others who survived.	
December 23, 1922	Three men†	†	Sturgeon River, Manitoba, Canada	Timber wolves killed a trapper and a bounty was placed on the animals. Shortly after, two First Nations hunters who had sought the bounty were found dead, surrounded by the carcasses of sixteen wolves.	
April 1922	Ben Cochrane, adult, male	† Predatory	Fisher River near Lake Winnipeg in Manitoba, Canada	A pack of timber wolves attacked and killed a trapper. His bones were found surrounded by the carcasses of eleven wolves: seven had been shot and four had been clubbed to death, with a broken rifle nearby.	
February 10, 1918	Unknown, adult, female	† Predatory	Châlus, France	A wolf or wolves killed and ate a woman near her home.	
January 27, 1914	Unknown, 8, female	† Predatory	Les Cars, France	A wolf or wolves killed a girl near the Les Cars forest.	
1912	Lavabre, female	† Predatory	Alrance, France	A wolf or wolves killed and partially ate a female near Nazareth in the forest of Lagast.	
1900	Unknown, adult, female	† Predatory	France	A wolf or wolves killed and ate a woman in a classroom.	

== 1800s ==
Date	Victim	Type of attack	Location	Circumstances	Refs
1897–1914	25 people	Rabid	Seven different counties, Poland		
1896–1897	205 people	Predatory	Kirov Oblast, Russia		
1896–1897	10 people	Predatory	Vologda Oblast, Russia		
1896–1897	18 people	Predatory	Kostroma Oblast, Russia		
1896–1897	One person	Predatory	Arkhangelsk Oblast, Russia		
1896–1897	Nine people	Predatory	Yaroslavl Oblast, Russia		
1880	Unknown, 8, male	Predatory	Uusikirkko, Karelia (then part of Finland)		
1880	Unknown†, child, female	Predatory	France	A wolf or wolves killed a girl in a barn.	
1879–1882	22-35 children	Predatory	Åbo, Finland	A pair of wolves were believed responsible for a series of attacks, with authorities calling on hunters from Russia, Lithuania and the Finnish army to kill them in January 1882.	
1877	Nine children		Tammerfors, Finland		
1875	160 people		Russia		
1875	21 people		Kurland, Latvia		
1 March 1873	L. Laurens†, 62	Predatory	Meyrueis, France	"Eaten by a wolf".	
1863	Unknown†, newborn, male	Predatory	Saint-Amant-de-Bonnieure, France	A wolf or wolves were believed responsible for the death of a newborn, whose partially eaten body was found in a forest.	
1859	Unknown, 12, female	Predatory	Eurajoki, Finland		
August 25, 1857	Marie Bourret†, adult, female; Bourret†, 10, female	Predatory	Châteauneuf-de-Randon, France	Wolves killed and ate a woman and her daughter.	
1850	Unknown†, child, female	Predatory	Luz-la-Croix-Haute, France	A wolf attacked and ate a child in a granary.	
1849–1851	266 adults and 110 children		Russia		
Autumn 1847	Ten children	Predatory	20 km from Shuya, Russia	The wolf was believed to be the same animal which had killed children in June.	
June 1847	Four children†, aged 4–9	Predatory	20 km from Shuya, Russia	In four attacks over a few days, a wolf killed four children, carrying a 9-year-old girl away.	
1839–1850	One adult and 20 children		Kimito, modern Russian Karelia		
1836	Three children		Kimito, Finland		
January 1831 – summer 1832	An adult and nine children	Predatory	Kaukola, Kareila, Finland		
July 9, 1824	Unknown†, 7, male	Predatory	Saint-Mary, France	"Eaten by a female wolf."	
May 31, 1824	Unknown, 6, male		Mszaniec village, Bieszczady Mountains, Poland		
May 19, 1824	Unknown†, 14 months, male	Predatory	Les Pins, France	"Eaten by a wolf."	
March 15, 1823	Ertmann†, adult, female; Joseph Fuge†, 46, male	Rabid	Mönsdorf village, near town of Rössel, East Prussia	A wolf attacked and injured four people in the neighbourhood of a farmyard before it was killed. Two victims later died of rabies infection.	
September 7, 1821	Pierre Clausse†, 3, male	Predatory	Théding, France	A wolf carried away and ate a boy.	
June 26, 1821	Dubois†, 6, male	Predatory	Saint-Estèphe, France	A wolf dragged away and killed the youngest of four boys who were tending to pigs.	
December 30, 1820 – March 27, 1821	12 people†, aged 3–19	Predatory	Gysinge, Gästrikland, Sweden	In a series of attacks, a single wolf was believed responsible for 12 deaths and 15 injuries. It was thought that the wolf had escaped from captivity and had lost its fear of humans.	
1820	50 people		Estonia		
July 11, 1819	Child†, 4	Predatory	La Ferté, Jura, France	"Caught and eaten by a wolf."	
1819	19 people		Węgrów, Poland		
January 16, 1818	Jean Baron†, 3, male	Predatory	Billy-sur-Oisy, France	A wolf dragged away and presumably ate a boy.	
February 23, 1818	François Talaron†, male	Predatory	St. Martial, France	A wolf or wolves were believed responsible for eating his body in the mountains.	
June 30, 1817	Unknown†, 4, female; Unknown†, 6, male	Predatory	Near Clamecy, France	A wolf killed a boy and girl who were tending livestock.	
1817	Child†	Predatory	Charentenay, France	A wolf killed a child; the attacker was initially misidentified as a hyena.	
August 15, 1817	Jean-Baptiste Vigne,† 7, male	Predatory	Sainte-Cécile-d'Andorge, France	A wolf dragged away and ate a boy.	
August 11, 1817	Jean Castanet†, 9, male	Predatory	Lamelouze, France	"Devoured".	
August 11, 1817	Anne Vaudry†, 6, female	Predatory	Rahon, France	A wolf killed and ate a girl. The animal was described as being the size of a calf.	
July 29, 1817	Unknown†, 8, male	Predatory	Montpont-en-Bresse, France	A pregnant wolf killed and ate a boy.	
September 11, 1816	Alexis-Félix Chat†, 10, male	Predatory	Gravières, France	"Devoured" by multiple wolves.	
October 10, 1816	Jean-Louis Barre, 7, male	Predatory	Chamborigaud, France		
October 17, 1816	Étienne Notet†, 13, male	Predatory	Surgy, France	A wolf attacked and killed a young shepherd.	
September 21, 1816	Pierre Noireau†, 19, male	Predatory	Asnières-sous-Bois, France	A wolf attacked and dragged a man, who subsequently died from his wounds.	
May 10, 1816	Unknown†, child; Unknown†, 9, female; Unknown†, 10, female	Predatory	Brèves, France	A wolf attacked and killed three children between the Nièvre and the Yonne. A wolf was killed and found to have human hair in its digestive tract.	
October 22, 1815	Unknown†, 10, male; Unknown†, 10, male	Predatory	Fontenay-sous-Fouronnes, France	A wolf killed two boys.	
October 11, 1815	Françoise Courtet†, 10, female	Predatory	Festigny, France	A wolf killed a girl who was picking acorns.	
August 8, 1815	Rose Rainard†j, 6, female	Predatory	Courry, France	A wolf dragged and ate a girl.	
June 20, 1815	Cécile Trial†, 12, female	Predatory	Les Vans, France	Throat torn out.	
May 9, 1815	Rose Coste†, 7, female	Predatory	Malbosc, France	A wolf killed and ate a girl outside her house.	
December 6, 1814	Two people†	Predatory	Chaingy, France	A wolf dubbed the Beast of Orléans killed two people and injured eight others.	
December 5, 1814	Marie-Anne Cribier, 14, female	Predatory	Huisseau-sur-Mauves, France		
November 20, 1814	Marie Domergue†, 30, female	Predatory	Saint-André-Capcèze, France	A wolf killed and partially ate a woman.	
October 14, 1814	Anne Robert veuve Comte†, 38, female	Predatory	Aujac, France	"Devoured by a wolf".	
October 28, 1814	Frédéric Comte, 4, male	Predatory	Les Vans, France		
September 3, 1814	Child†	Predatory	Blannay, France	A wolf inflicted fatal injuries on a child.	
September 3, 1814	Child	Predatory	Sermizelles, France		
September 1, 1814	Child	Predatory	Malbosc, France		
September 1, 1814	Child	Predatory	Aujac, France		
September 1, 1814	Rose Figeire†, 4, female	Predatory	Ponteils-et-Brésis, France	A wolf dragged away and partially ate a girl.	
August 28, 1814	François†, 6, male	Predatory	Malons-et-Elze, France	"Devoured by a wolf".	
July 14, 1814	Unknown†, adult, female	Predatory	Saint-Cyr-les-Colons, France	A "furious" wolf killed and partially ate a woman.	
June 31, 1814	Unknown†, 8, female	Predatory	Saint-Moré, France	A wolf killed and ate a girl, and injured two other children on the same day.	
May 26, 1814	Unknown†, 8, female	Predatory	Voutenay-sur-Cure, France	A wolf dragged away and ate a girl, and had bitten an older girl on the same day.	
October 22, 1813	Rose Henriette Dumas†, 7, female	Predatory	Saint-André-de-Cruzières, France	A wolf killed and partially ate a girl.	
September 8, 1813	Joseph Gadilhe†, 14, male	Predatory	Banne, France	A "wolf-like animal" killed and ate a boy.	
August 22, 1813	Marie Rose André†, 7, female	Predatory	Concoules, France	A wolf killed and partially ate a girl.	
June 29, 1813	Unknown†, child, female	Predatory	Morey, France		
June 29, 1813	Unknown†, adult, female	Predatory	Percey-le-Grand, France	Wolves ate a woman.	
June 28, 1813	Charbonnet†, 12, female	Predatory	Cult, Haute-Saône, France	A wolf killed and ate a shepherd girl who was guarding her flock with her mother.	
June 25, 1813	Cardot†, 10, female	Predatory	Chancey, France	A wolf or wolves killed and ate a girl who was gathering herbs.	
May 30, 1813	Jean-Baptiste Nicolas†, 7, male	Predatory	Sénéchas, France	A wolf inflicted fatal bites on a boy.	
February 6, 1813	Catherine Figeire†, 11, female	Predatory	Ponteils, France	"Devoured".	
January 22, 1812	Marie-Rose Hours†, 9, female	Predatory	Malbosc, France	A wolf inflicted fatal bites on a girl.	
January 8, 1813	Augustin Coulomb†, 8, male	Predatory	Sainte-Marguerite-Lafigère, France	A wolf attacked and partially ate a boy.	
December 30, 1812	Joseph Pialet†, 3, male	Predatory	Malbosc, France	A wolf carried a boy away from his yard and inflicted fatal injuries.	
November 21, 1812	Marie Dairès†, 9, female	Predatory	Malons-et-Elze, France	Three wolves attacked and killed a shepherd girl who was protecting her flock.	
November 19, 1812	Pierre-Victor Albaric†, 4, male	Predatory	Vialas, France	A wolf killed and partially ate a boy.	
October 29, 1812	Joseph Auziol†, 13, male	Predatory	Malbosc, France	A wolf killed and ate a boy near his house.	
October 28, 1812	Marie Chat†, 3, female	Predatory	Gravières, France	A wolf killed and ate a girl near her home.	
October 26, 1812	Jean Placide Hours†, 6, male	Predatory	Malbosc, France	"Devoured."	
October 21, 1812	Cyprien Marcias†, 10, male	Predatory	Concoules, France	A wolf, described as "enormous", killed a boy.	
September 8, 1812	François Marcy†, 7, male	Predatory	Les Vans, France	A wolf or wolves were believed to have killed and partially eaten a boy, burying some body parts in a pit.	
August 14, 1812	Unknown child†	Predatory	Near Mailley, France	Wolves inflicted fatal injuries on a child that was walking home.	
January, 1812	Unknown, 13, male	Predatory	Crozon, France		
October 11, 1811	Louis Herpeux, 14, male	Predatory	Québriac, France	A large wolf dragged a boy into a forest.	
September 22, 1811	Isaac†, 5, male	Predatory	Concoules, France	A wolf killed and partially ate a boy.	
September 15, 1811	Jaques-François Claudinot†, 10, male	Predatory	Aujac, France		
August 25, 1811	Pierre André†, 5, male	Predatory	Concoules, France	A wolf killed and partially ate a boy.	
July 3, 1811	Unknown, child	Predatory	Vezet, France		
July 3, 1811	Unknown, child	Predatory	Arbecey, France		
April 14, 1811	Three children	Predatory	Near Ponteils, France		
March 24, 1811	Jean-Baptiste Blanc†, 6, male	Predatory	Saint-André-Capèze, France	Wolves killed a shepherd boy defending his flock.	
February 15, 1811	Unknown, 9, female	Predatory	Clairefontaine, France	A wolf severely injured a girl near a woodland, attacking for half an hour before she was rescued.	
August 17, 1810	Judith Geraets†, 3, female	Predatory	Beringen, Helden, The Netherlands	A wolf killed a girl who was collecting cattle feed in the field with her ten-year-old sister at 8:00 pm. The wolf took the child into the moorland to eat the child. The next day her intestines were found during a drive-hunt. On September 2, a wolf was encountered with a child's head in his mouth.	
October 6, 1809	Victoire Polge†, 7, male	Predatory	Génolhac, France	A wolf or wolves were believed to have attacked and eaten a boy.	
October 2, 1809	Jean Almeras†, 5, male	Predatory	Ponteils, France	A wolf killed and ate a shepherd boy defending his flock.	
June 10, 1809	Adélaïde Simon, 9, female	Predatory	Sénoncourt, France	A wolf killed a shepherd girl guarding her flock.	
June 3, 1809	Unknown†, 10, male	Predatory	Amance, France	A wolf killed a boy who was tending to livestock with two friends.	
March 28, 1809	Antoine Fleurot†, 19, male	Predatory	Saint-Léger-Vauban, France	A wolf or wolves killed and partially ate a man.	
1807	Unknown†, child, female	Predatory	Cugnet, France	A wolf or wolves killed and partially ate a girl.	
July, 1807	Two children	Predatory	Near Beauvais, France		
June 24, 1807	Unknown†, 4, male	Predatory	Yssingeaux, France	A wolf carried away and ate a boy.	
June 13, 1807	Vitaux†, 8, male	Predatory	Sacy, France	Starving wolves ate a boy.	
June, 1807	Unknown†, child	Predatory	Near Beauvais, France	A wolf killed one child and seriously injured another.	
July, 1806	Unknown†, 4, female	Predatory	Saint-Géry, France	A wolf partially ate a girl in front of her house.	
July 1, 1801	Berthe†, 12, female	Predatory	La Chapelle-Saint-André, France	A wolf killed and ate a girl and injured several other children.	
June 30, 1801	Midrouillet, 14, male	Predatory	Colméry, France		
June 17, 1801	Gayeux†, 14, female	Predatory	La Chapelle-Saint-André, France	A wolf ate a shepherd boy who was tending his flock.	
June 15, 1801	Coignet†, 12, female	Predatory	Menou, France	A wolf ate a shepherd girl who was tending her flock.	
June 13, 1801	Jean Aimard†, 10, male	Predatory	Oudan, France	A wolf ate a shepherd boy who was tending his flock.	
June 12, 1801	Jean Paisan†, 5, male	Predatory	Varzy, France	A wolf ate a shepherd boy who was tending his flock.	
May 25, 1801	Madeleine Champy†, 10, female	Predatory	Varzy, France	A wolf described as a "greyhound" or "morning wolf" killed and ate a girl.	
December 28, 1800	Unknown, about 6–8 years, female	Predatory	Sørum, Akershus, Norway		

== 1700s ==
Date	Victim	Type of attack	Location	Circumstances	Refs
July 7, 1799	Julien, child, female	Predatory	Veyreau, France		
July 7, 1799	Graille, child, male	Predatory	Veyreau, France		
June 23, 1799	Pierre-Jean Mauri, 6, male	Predatory	Veyreau, France		
November 4, 1797	François Nante†, 10, male	Predatory	La Tranclière, France	Wolves ate a boy.	
August 18, 1797	Unknown†, 5	Predatory	Viliers-sur-Loir, France	Wolves ate a child, prompting a large-scale hunt at Montoire.	
September 10, 1796	Jean Delpuech†, 7, male	Predatory	Pleaux, France	A wolf inflicted fatal injuries on a boy near the "Dix-Maisons" section.	
May 4, 1796	8-10 children	Predatory	Donzy, France		
May 17, 1795	Marie Angélique†, 4, female	Predatory	Morteau, France	A wolf killed and partially ate a girl.	
November 11, 1793	Maupin†, 9, male	Predatory	Perrancey, France	A wolf killed and ate a boy.	
October 7, 1793	Aubin Charles†, 12, male		Sacquenay, France	A wolf inflicted fatal injuries on a boy.	
September 1, 1793	Nicolas Roth†, 6, male	Predatory	Selongey, France	A wolf or wolves killed and ate a boy near the Saint-Anne chapel.	
June 20, 1793	Anne Claude Berthiaux†, child, female	Predatory	Thervay, France	A wolf killed a girl.	
July 4 – August 22, 1792	11 children: Maria Antonia Rimoldi†, child, female; Giuseppa Re†, 13, female; Anna Maria Borghi†, 13, female; Regina Mosca, 12, female; Giovanna Sada†, 10, female; Domenico Cattaneo†, 13, male; Antonia Maria Beretta†, 8, female; Giuseppa Saracchi†, 6, female; Carlo Oca†, 8, male,;Giuseppe Antonio Gaudenzio†, 10, male	† Predatory	Northern Italy	A single wolf was thought responsible for a dozen attacks on children, including nine fatalities, with several victims carried away and partially eaten. Six of the children had been tending to livestock, others were gathering wood or herbs. A wolf was subsequently captured in a pit on September 18 and killed.	
June 19, 1788	Anne Court, 25, female	Predatory	Les Adrets-de-l'Estérel, France		
June 26, 1788	François†, 8, male	Predatory	Plan de la Tour, France	A wolf or wolves killed and ate a boy during the night near the bastide of Guigonet.	
June 6, 1788	Dominique Pierruguès, 11, male	Predatory	Callas, France		
April 1, 1788	Unknown†, 14, male	Predatory	Brie, France	A wolf, described as "monstrous", ate a boy.	
1788	Unknown†, 10	Predatory	Castelnau-de-Brassac, France	Wolves attacked a boy in full daylight, inflicting fatal injuries.	
August 29, 1787	Unknown†, child, male	Rabid	Saint-Marcel, France	A wolf fatally injured a boy.	
September 25, 1786	Unknown, adult, male	Predatory	Rabouillet, France	Five wolves attacked a man near his cabin.	
1785	Two men†	Predatory	Mirebeau, France	Wolves, which were unknown in the area, killed two men.	
August 29, 1785	Geneviève Gauthier†, 62, female	Predatory	Baule, France	A wolf, which had terrorized the area for 5–6 months, fatally injured a woman.	
June 22, 1785	Louise Angélique Sainson, 18, female	Predatory	Meung-sur-Loire, France		
February 28, 1784	Madaleine Fournier†, 40, female	Predatory	Houssay, France	A starving wolf killed and partially ate a woman.	
February 28, 1784	Jeanne Crosnier, 60, female	Predatory	Houssay, France		
June 11, 1784	Unknown†, 37, female	Predatory	Vouzy, France	A wolf killed and ate a woman.	
April 15, 1783	Unknown†, 10, male	Predatory	Montsauche, France	A wolf dragged away and killed a shepherd boy who was guarding a flock with two other boys.	
October 13, 1777	Benoîte Branchu, 13, female	Predatory	Cormaranche-en-Bugey, France		
October 9, 1777	Philibert Martinaud, 3, female	Predatory	Ruffieu, France		
September 16, 1777	Unknown†, 3	Predatory	Dramely, France	A wolf dragged away and partially ate a child.	
August 6, 1777	Françoise Combet, 4, female	Predatory	Hautville-Lompnes, France		
July 23, 1777	Jean-Baptiste Flamier†, 7, male	Predatory	Arinthod, France	A wolf dragged a boy into a field and inflicted fatal injuries.	
June 13, 1777	Benoît Janin-Tivolet†, 9, male	Predatory	Hauteville-Lompnes, France	A wolf fatally injured a boy.	
April 2, 1777	Marie-Claudine Marillier, 4, female	Predatory	Charchilla, France		
February, 1776	Marchon†, child	Predatory	Valfin-sur-Valouse, France	A wolf killed and partially ate a child.	
November 11, 1776	Claude Joseph Comte, 5, male	Predatory	Vescles, France		
September 4, 1776	Joseph Charpillon, 7, male	Predatory	Vescles, France		
August 22, 1776	Claude-Marie Perrot, 8, female	Predatory	Légna, France		
June 17, 1776	Jeanne-Louise Robert†, 7, female	Predatory	Le Balme-de-Siligny, France	A wolf inflicted fatal bites on a girl.	
May 11, 1776	Unknown†, 13, male	Predatory	Onoz, France	Wolves killed and ate a boy.	
1773	17 children	Predatory	Arinthod, France		
August 13, 1773	Isabelle Le Deuff†, 9, female	Predatory	Melgven, France	A wolf, thought to be a starving female, killed and ate a girl.	
August, 1773	Unknown†, 8, female	Predatory	Rosporden, France	A wolf carried away a girl, whose remains were found alongside those of an older person.	
May 20, 1772	Jean-Baptiste Leroy†, 7, male	Predatory	Saint-Ay, France	Wolf prints were found near a boy's remains.	
December 4, 1772	Nicolas Guillaumé, 4, male	Predatory	Paucourt, France		
October, 1771	Unknown†, adult, male	Predatory	Near Forges-les-Eaux, France	Wolves killed and partially ate a man.	
September 23, 1770	Unknown, child, male	Predatory	Charleval, France		
September 22, 1770	Unknown†, child, male	Predatory	Auzouville-sur-Ry, France	A wolf inflicted fatal injuries on a boy, despite his rescue by other children.	
September 21, 1770	Unknown†, 11, female	Predatory	Saint-Aignan-sur-Ry, France	A wolf called "hare wolf" killed a girl.	
September 13, 1770	Mulot†, 8, male	Predatory	Charleval, France	A white female wolf with pups killed a boy, raising rumours that the animal was a werewolf, a Jesuit or a witch.	
September 8, 1770	Passeleur, 6, female	Predatory	Saint-Denis-le-Thiboult, France		
September 8, 1770	Unknown†, 7, male	Predatory	Ry, France	A wolf called "hare wolf" dragged away and partially ate a boy.	
November 21, 1765	14 people	Rabid	Orio Litta, Northern Italy.	In a series of attacks, a female wolf from the Adda woodlands bit 16 people as well as dogs and horses before being killed. A medic in Milan confirmed that it had been rabid.	
June 1764 – June 1767	113 people†	Predatory	Gévaudan, France.	One or two abnormal wolves were believed responsible for the deaths of 113 people in 210 attacks, which stopped after Jean Chastel shot an oversized wolf with unusual coloration. However, the identity of the two killed wolves as the attackers and the taxonomic status of the attacking species are still a matter of controversy. See Beast of Gévaudan	
January, 1763	Nils Nilsson, 8, male	Predatory	Västergötland, Sweden		
August 15, 1747	Antonio Selva, 65, male	Rabid	Mottalciata, Northern Italy	A wolf bit a man on the head.	
August 26, 1738	Margherita Cracco, 12, female	Predatory	Salussola, Northern Italy.		
June 29, 1738	Maria Lozia, 14, female	Predatory	Salussola, Northern Italy.		
October 10, 1737	Maria Azeglio, 12, female	Predatory	Salussola, Northern Italy.		
September 4, 1737	Angela Maria Badone†, 12, female	Predatory	Massazza, Northern Italy.	A wolf killed and ate a shepherd girl who was tending her flock.	
July 5, 1737	Caterina Messerano†, 11, female	Predatory	Benna, Northern Italy.	A wolf or wolves killed a shepherd girl who was tending her flock.	
October 13, 1736	Angelica Maria Francesca Baijs†, 8, female	Predatory	Massazza, Northern Italy.	A wolf carried a girl away and inflicted fatal wounds before being chased away.	
July 11, 1732	Anna Caterina Barbero, 12, female	Predatory	Salussola, Northern Italy.		
Holy Saturday, 1732	Domenica Pozzo, 13, female	Predatory	Zimone, Northern Italy.		
April 27, 1732	Maria Borri Piombin, 14, female	Predatory	Benna, Northern Italy.		
April 14, 1732	Anna Maria Ferrero, 6, female	Predatory	Roppolo, Northern Italy.		
March 30, 1732	Margherita Noé†, 6, female	Predatory	Salussola, Northern Italy.	Wolves inflicted fatal injuries on a girl.	
March 27, 1732	Domenica Maria Rodda†, 4, female	Predatory	Cavaglià, Northern Italy.	A wolf or wolves inflicted fatal wounds on a girl.	
August 3, 1731	Borta Johansdotter, 12, female	Predatory	Dalsland, Sweden		
1730	Margherita Garrone†, 8, female	Predatory	Cavaglià, Northern Italy.	A wolf or wolves killed and partially ate a girl near her home.	
September 18, 1729	Bartolomeo Perazzone di Zimone†, 9, male	Predatory	Cavaglià, Northern Italy.	A wolf or wolves killed and partially ate a shepherd boy who was tending his flock.	
July 10, 1729	Caterina Cabrio†, 2, female	Predatory	Cavaglià, Northern Italy.	A wolf or wolves killed and partially ate a girl.	
July 7, 1729	Giuseppe Cabrio, 10, male	Predatory	Cavaglià, Northern Italy.		
June 25, 1729	Giovanni Battista Giaretti†, 12, male	Predatory	Cavaglià, Northern Italy.	A wolf or wolves killed a shepherd boy who was tending his flock.	
January 6, 1728 and December 17, 1727	Jon Ersson, 9, male; Jon Svensson, 4, male	Predatory	Värmland County, Sweden	One wolf was believed responsible for two separate attacks.	
April 29, 1711	Two shepherds†, adults	Rabid	Ronca, Northern Italy.	A wolf injured two shepherds who subsequently died from rabies infection. The animal was believed to have bitten over 100 livestock in San Lino del Belvedere and San Giovanni a Longe.	
September 9, 1705	Annunciata Maria Almasio†, 7, female	Predatory	Rebaù, Gorla Maggiore, Northern Italy.	A wolf or wolves were believed to have killed and partially eaten a girl.	
August 28, 1705	Maria Campascina†, 65, female	Predatory	Rebaù, Gorla Maggiore, Northern Italy.	A wolf or wolves were believed to have killed a woman who was working in a field.	
March, 1705	Anna Maria†, 9, female	Predatory	Gorla Maggiore, Northern Italy.	A wolf or wolves were believed to have killed and eaten a girl in her home.	
1704	16 people	Predatory	Varesotto, Northern Italy.		

== 1600s ==
Date	Victim	Type of attack	Location — Circumstances
1650	Unknown child, age unknown, female	† Predatory (Legend)	Germany, Holzhausen (near Langenpreising) — A girl on the way from the Myrtenhof to Holzhausen was attacked and killed by a wolf.

== 1400s ==
Date	Victim	Type of attack	Location — Circumstances
1439	40+ Parisians	Predatory (Legend)	France, Paris — During a harsh winter, a large pack of starving wolves began preying on Parisians, led by a red-furred wolf named Courtaud (French for Bobtail). The pack slipped into the Notre Dame Square one day and killed a group of 40 clergymen. Later, the people of Paris lured the pack into Notre Dame and ambushed them with arrows, spears and rocks, killing all the wolves, including Courtaud.

== 1300s ==
Date	Victim	Type of attack	Location — Circumstances
July 18, 1340	Radegund von Wellenburg, age unknown, female	† Unprovoked (Legend)	Germany, Augsburg, Bergheim — Radegund was a maid at the castle of Wellenburg, the ancestral home of the Fugger family. She was on her way to care for sick people near the woods and was attacked by a wolf pack. Three days later, she died of the injuries.

== See also ==
- List of fatal alligator attacks in the United States
- List of fatal bear attacks in North America
- List of fatal cougar attacks in North America
- List of fatal dog attacks
- Fatal dog attacks in the United States
- List of fatal snake bites in the United States
- List of wolf attacks in North America

== Bibliography ==
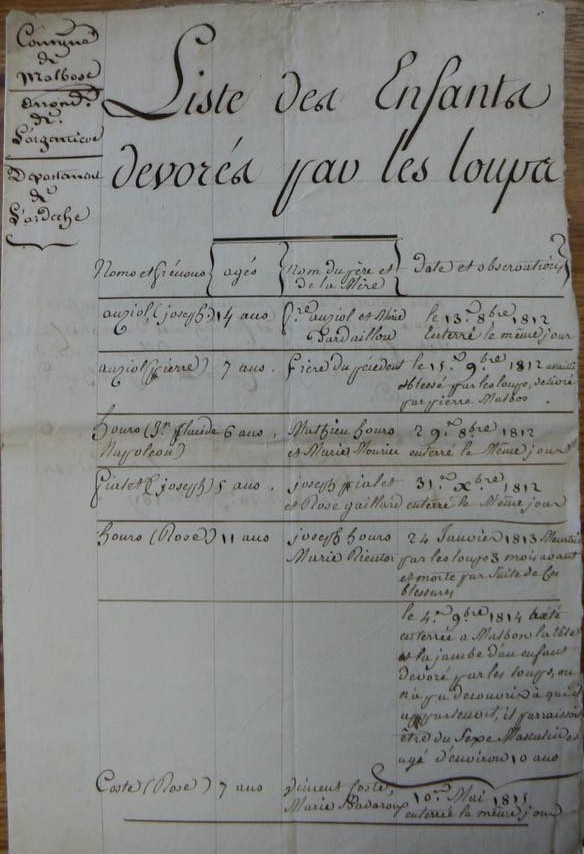
List of children eaten by wolves, commune of Malbosc, France, from 1812 to 1815

- Graves, Will (2007). Wolves in Russia: Anxiety throughout the ages. Detselig Enterprises. ISBN 978-1-55059-332-7.
- Heptner, V. G.; Naumov, N. P. (1998). Mammals of the Soviet Union Vol.II Part 1a, Sirenia and Carnivora (Sea cows; Wolves and Bears). Science Publishers. ISBN 1-886106-81-9.
- Linnell, John D. C.; Kovtun, Ekaterina; Rouart, Ive (2021). Wolf attacks on humans: an update for 2002–2020. NINA Report 1944 Norwegian Institute for Nature Research (PDF). NINA. ISBN 978-82-426-4721-4. Archived from the original (PDF) on 2022-10-26.
- Linnell, J.D.C. (2002). The Fear of Wolves: A Review of Wolf Attacks on Humans (PDF). NINA. ISBN 82-426-1292-7. Archived from the original (PDF) on 2013-11-09.
- Lopez, Barry H. (1978). Of Wolves and Men. J. M. Dent and Sons. ISBN 0-7432-4936-4.
- Marvin, Garry (2012). Wolf. Reaktion Books. ISBN 978-1-86189-879-1.
- Mech, L. David (1981). The Wolf: The Ecology and Behaviour of an Endangered Species. University of Minnesota Press. ISBN 0-8166-1026-6.
- Mech, L. David; Boitani, Luigi (2003). Wolves: Behaviour, Ecology and Conservation. University of Chicago Press. ISBN 0-226-51696-2.
- Moriceau, Jean-Marc (2008). Histoire du méchant loup: 3 000 attaques sur l'homme en France (in French). Fayard. ISBN 978-2-213-62880-6.
