= Shuya =

Shuya may refer to:

== Places ==
- Shuya (inhabited locality), name of several inhabited localities in Russia
- Shuya (Karelia), Neva basin, Russia
- Shuya (Kostroma Oblast), Volga basin, Russia

== People with the given name ==
- Shuya Akamatsu (赤松 秀哉; born 1993), Japanese footballer
- Shuya Iwai (岩井 柊弥; born 2000), Japanese footballer
- Shuya Takano (高野 秀哉; born 2004), Japanese footballer
- Shuya Yamashita (山下 柊哉; born 1999), Japanese footballer

=== Fictional characters ===
- Shuya Nanahara, a manga character
