= Bahraich wolf attacks =

Series of wolf attacks on humans

Bahraich district in the Indian state of Uttar Pradesh where the attacks took place.

The Bahraich wolf attacks were a series of wolf attacks on humans which occurred between March and September 2024 in Bahraich district in the Indian state of Uttar Pradesh. The attacks were suspected to be carried out by a pack of six wolves. In August 2024, the Government of Uttar Pradesh launched Operation Bhediya to capture the wolves. As of 11 September 2024, at least ten people have been killed with more than 30 people injured in the suspected attacks by these wolves. Five of the wolves suspected to be behind the attacks were captured.

== Background ==
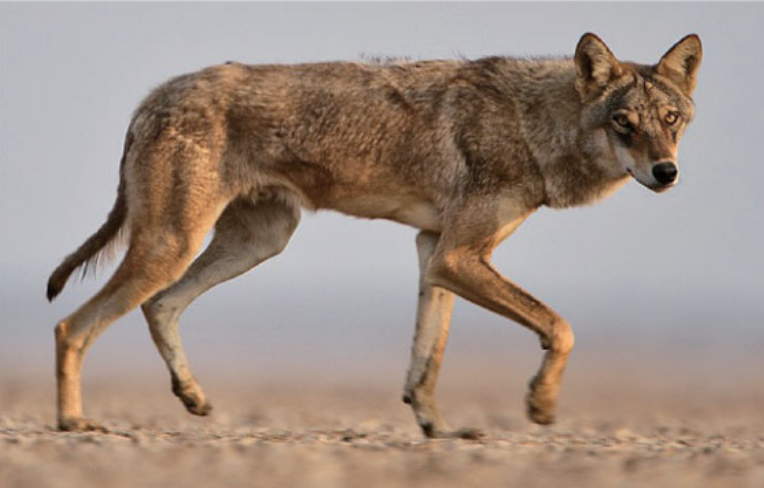
An Indian wolf

The Indian wolf (Canis lupus pallipes) is a subspecies of gray wolf. It is classified as endangered, with the Indian population estimated at 3000 mature individuals. Wolf attacks on humans are rare occurrences and are mostly carried out by wolves infected with rabies, which attack humans without consuming them. As per a report by the Norwegian Institute for Nature Research, about 489 cases of wolf attacks were reported between 2002 and 2020 across 21 countries including India, of which only 26 were fatal.

The Indian state of Uttar Pradesh has a history of wolf attacks: in 1996, a lone wolf killed 42 children in the districts of Pratapgarh, Sultanpur and Jaunpur, with 13 wolves being killed in response.

== Location ==
About 50 villages are located in the Mahasi Tehsil of Bahraich district in Uttar Pradesh along the floodplains of the Ghaghara River. The surrounding forests and grasslands host wolf populations. Sugarcane is widely cultivated in the region and the wolves often use the tall standing crops in the sugarcane fields to hide themselves.

== Attacks ==
Since March 2024, suspected attacks by wolves have been reported in Bahraich district. On March 10, a wolf carried away a three-year-old girl from Mishram Purwa village when she was sleeping in the open and her body was never recovered. On March 28, a lone wolf killed a one-year-old child in Nayapurwa village. The attacks escalated after a one-month old boy from Sikandarpur village was taken by the wolves on July 17. A two-year old was killed on July 28 and another eight-year-old boy was taken away by the wolves on August 3. On August 17, a four-year-old girl, who was sleeping outside her house was dragged away during a power cut and on August 24, an eight-year-old girl from the Majhra Bhatoli village became the fifth child victim of the wolves in one month.

On August 27, another infant was killed by the wolves. On September 2, the wolves killed a three year old and attacked two elderly women in Nauhan Garethi village on the same night. On September 4, the wolves entered a house and carried away a sleeping seven-year-old boy, whose body was found the next day. On 10 September, a lone wolf attacked and injured two girls on the same night in separate incidents, which was followed by an attack on 50-year-old woman the next day. The incidents occurred at night when the victims were sleeping and the wolf ran away after the villagers raised alarm. As of 11 September 2024, at least ten people including nine children and a 45-year-old woman have been killed. More than 30 people were injured in the suspected attacks by these wolves. As most people in these villages live in poverty, the houses do not have doors and most of the victims were attacked in their houses while sleeping at night.

== Animals involved ==
Based on camera traps and images captured by drones, six wolves were suspected to be behind the attacks. The local villagers claimed that nearly 24 wolves may be involved, citing the sightings of the animals in the villages. Scientist Y. V. Jhala commented that there is no definite proof to link these wolves to the attacks and the attacks might have been carried out by wolves or wolf-dog hybrids. Officials stated that some of the attacks attributed to the wolves could have been by other animals.

According to Amita Kanaujia of the Lucknow University, climate change has resulted in flooding during the monsoons, which have altered the habitat of the wolves. As a result, the wolves are often driven out of the traditional habitat and forced into human settlements in search of food. Officials have stated that the animals might have been infected by rabies or they might have started attacking humans for encroaching their territory.

== Response ==
The Government of Uttar Pradesh launched a campaign named Operation Bhediya to capture the wolves that were suspected to be behind the attacks. About 16 separate teams were formed to track down the wolves. The forest department used thermal cameras and pug marks to track the wolves. On 29 August, the first wolf was caught after movement was deducted in the cameras. Another three wolves were caught in quick succession. Out of the four wolves, two died during capture. On 10 September, a fifth wolf was caught in the trap set by the officials near Sisai Churamani. The female wolf had killed a goat the previous night. The captured wolves were tranquilised and sent to Gorakhpur Zoo. The sixth and final wolf was killed by villagers.

Following multiple attacks, the villagers feared for their lives and even killed a dog on suspicion. The state government has conducted awareness campaigns in the area and the villagers were instructed to install doors to the houses. Night patrolling was conducted and solar powered lights were installed in common areas. Dung and urine of Indian elephants were used in an effort to ward of the wolves from the populated villages. The government announced a ex-gratia financial assistance of ₹500,000 (US$5,200) to the deceased.

== See also ==
- List of wolf attacks
- Stray dog attacks § India
