= Wolf attack =

Injuries to humans or their property from wolves

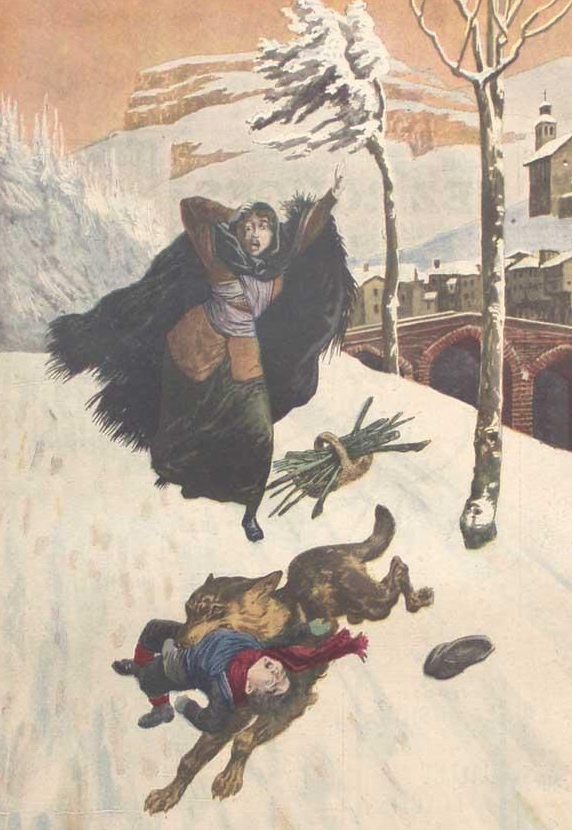
Predatory attack on a child in northern Spain, as depicted on a 1914 issue of Le Petit Journal

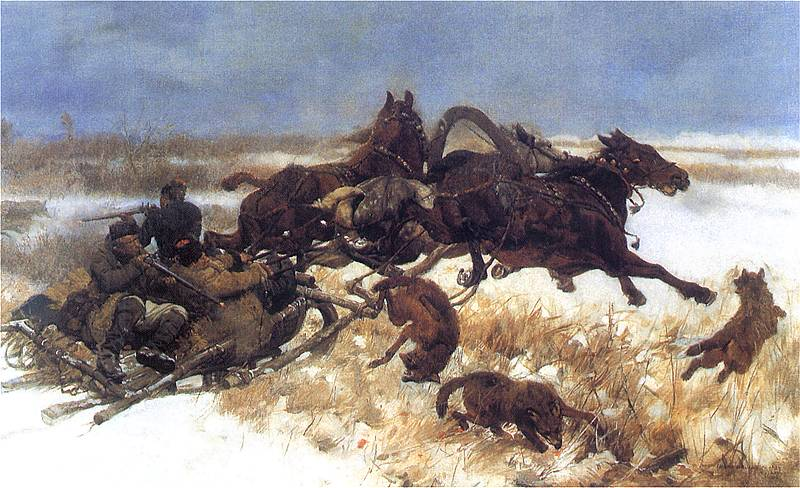
Napad wilków (attack of the wolves) by Józef Chełmoński (1883) at the Museum of Polish Army, Warsaw, Poland

Wolf attacks are injuries to humans or their property by gray wolves. Their frequency varies based on the human and wolf populations and the interactions of these populations. Wolves, like any predator, choose prey based on circumstances. If a human is juvenile, small, alone or injured this increases the chance of a wolf attack as it would any prey species; a population of both wolves and humans living in the same environment increases the chances of a predatory circumstance occurring. Wolf attacks are rare where human-wolf interactions are rare and escalate as human-wolf interactions escalate. Experts categorize wolf attacks into various types, including rabies-infected, predatory, agonistic, and defensive.

The country with the most extensive historical record is France, where nearly 10,000 fatal attacks were documented from 1200 to 1920. A study by the Norwegian Institute of Nature Research showed that there were eight fatal attacks in Europe and Russia, three in North America, and more than 200 in south Asia in the half-century up to 2002. The updated edition of the study revealed 498 attacks on humans worldwide for the years 2002 to 2020, with 25 deaths, including 14 attributed to rabies.

== Wolf–human interactions ==
The gray wolf is the largest wild member of the canid family, with males averaging 43–45 kg (95–99 lb), and females 36–38.5 kg (79–85 lb). It is the most specialized member of its genus in the direction of carnivory and hunting large game.

Although they primarily target ungulates, wolves are at times versatile in their diet; for example, those in the Mediterranean region largely subsist on garbage and domestic animals. They have powerful jaws and teeth and robust bodies capable of great endurance, and often run in large packs. Nevertheless, they tend to fear and avoid humans, especially in North America.

Wolves vary in temperament and their reaction to humans. Those with little prior experience with humans, and those positively conditioned through feeding, may lack fear. Wolves living in open areas, for example the North American Great Plains, historically showed little fear before the advancement of firearms in the 19th century, and would follow human hunters to feed on their kills, particularly bison. In contrast, forest-dwelling wolves in North America were noted for shyness.

Wolf biologist L. David Mech hypothesized in 1998 that wolves generally avoid humans because of fear instilled by hunting. Mech also noted that humans' upright posture is unlike wolves' other prey, and similar to some postures of bears, which wolves usually avoid. He speculated that attacks are preceded by habituation to humans, while a successful outcome for the wolf may lead to repeated behavior, as documented especially in India.

== Categories ==
Wolf attacks have been classified as "rabid", "provoked", "predatory"; "exploratory" or "investigative"; or "agonistic".

=== Rabid ===
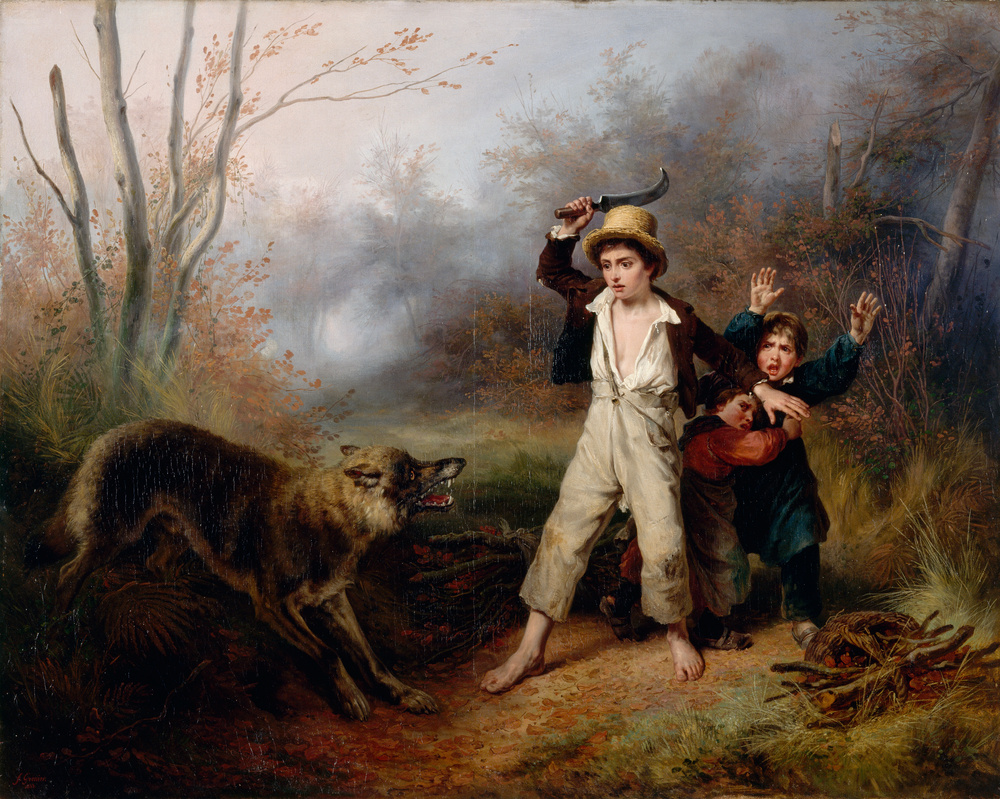
Petits paysans surpris par un loup ("Little peasants surprised by a wolf") by François Grenier de Saint-Martin, 1833

Cases of rabid wolves are low when compared to other species since wolves do not serve as primary reservoirs, but can be infected with rabies from other animals such as dogs, golden jackals and foxes. Cases of rabies in wolves are very rare in North America, though numerous in the eastern Mediterranean, Middle East and Central Asia. The reason for this is unclear, though it may be connected with the presence of jackals in those areas, as jackals have been identified as primary carriers. Wolves apparently develop the "furious" phase of rabies to a very high degree, which, coupled with their size and strength, makes rabid wolves perhaps the most dangerous of rabid animals, with bites from rabid wolves being 15 times more dangerous than those of rabid dogs. Rabid wolves usually act alone, traveling large distances and often biting large numbers of people and domestic animals. Most rabid wolf attacks occur in the spring and autumn periods. Unlike with predatory attacks, the victims of rabid wolves are not eaten, and the attacks generally only occur on a single day. Also, rabid wolves attack their victims at random, showing none of the selectivity displayed by predatory wolves, though the majority of recorded cases involve adult men, as men were frequently employed in agricultural and forestry activities which put them into contact with wolves.

=== Provoked ===
Attacks whose victims had been threatening, disciplining, disturbing, teasing, or annoying attacking wolves, their pups, families, or packs are classified as "provoked", "defensive" or "disciplinary". The attackers in such cases seem motivated, not by hunger, but fear or anger and the need to escape from or drive the victim away. Examples would include a sheep-hunting wolf disturbed by a shepherd who is defending his flock; a captive wolf attacking an abusive handler; a mother wolf attacking a hiker who had wandered near her pups; an attack on a wolf hunter in active pursuit; or a wildlife photographer, park visitor, or field biologist who had gotten too close for the wolf's comfort. While such attacks may still be dangerous, they tend to be limited to quick bites and not pressed.

=== Predatory ===
Unprovoked wolf attacks motivated by hunger are categorized as "predatory". In some such cases, a cautious wolf may launch "investigative" or "exploratory" attacks to test the victim for suitability as prey. As with defensive attacks, such attacks are not always pressed, as the wolf may break off the attack or be convinced to look elsewhere for its next meal. In contrast, during "determined" predatory attacks, the victims may be repeatedly bitten on the head and face and dragged off and consumed, sometimes as far away as 2.5 km from the attack site, unless the wolf or wolves are driven off. Experts in India use the term "child lifting" to describe predatory attacks in which the animal silently enters a hut while everyone is sleeping, picks up a child, often with a silencing bite to the mouth and nose, and carries a child off by the head. Such attacks typically occur in local clusters, and generally do not stop until the wolves involved are eliminated.

=== Agonistic ===
Agonistic attacks are motivated not by hunger nor fear but rather by aggression; designed to kill or drive off a competitor away from a territory or food source. As with predatory attacks, these may begin with or be limited to exploratory or investigative attacks designed to test the vulnerability and determination of the victim. Even when pressed until the death of the victim, agonistic attacks normally leave the victims body uneaten, at least for some time.

== Factors ==
=== Habituation ===
Wolf attacks are more likely to happen when preceded by a long period of habituation, during which wolves gradually lose their fear of humans. This was apparent in cases involving habituated North American wolves in Algonquin Provincial Park, Vargas Island Provincial Park and Ice Bay, as well as 19th-century cases involving escaped captive wolves in Sweden and Estonia.

=== Seasonality ===
Predatory attacks can occur at any time of the year, with a peak in the June–August period, when the chances of people entering forested areas (for livestock grazing or berry and mushroom picking) increase, though cases of non-rabid wolf attacks in winter have been recorded in Belarus, the Kirovsk and Irkutsk districts, in Karelia, and in Ukraine. Wolves with pups experience greater food stresses during this period.

=== Victim age and sex ===
A worldwide 2002 study by the Norwegian Institute of Nature Research showed that 90% of victims of predatory attacks were people under the age of 18, especially under the age of 10. In the rare cases where adults were killed, the victims were almost always women. This is consistent with wolf hunting strategies, wherein the weakest and most vulnerable categories of prey are targeted. Aside from their physical weakness, children were historically more vulnerable to wolves as they were more likely to enter forests unattended to pick berries and mushrooms, as well as tend and watch over cattle and sheep on pastures. While these practices have largely died out in Europe, they are still the case in India, where numerous attacks have been recorded in recent decades. Further reason for the vulnerability of children is the fact that some may mistake wolves for dogs and thus approach them.

=== Wild vs. captive ===
Experts may distinguish between captive and wild wolf attacks, the former referring to attacks by wolves who, while still wild animals, are kept in captivity. Captive wolves may be kept as pets, in zoos, or in other similar situations.

== History and perception worldwide ==
=== Europe ===
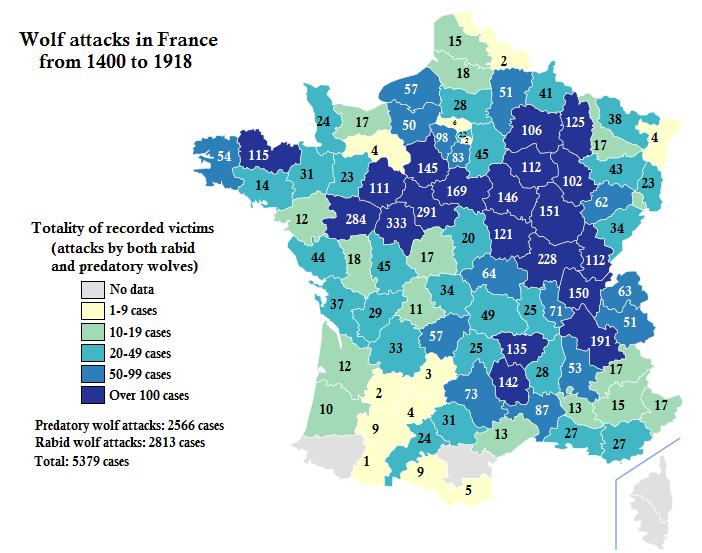
Map showing the number of wolf attacks in France by département from 1400 to 1918

Map of Eurasia showing the distribution of wolf attacks, with blue indicating areas where both rabid and predatory attacks occurred, purple for purely predatory attacks, and yellow for purely rabid ones

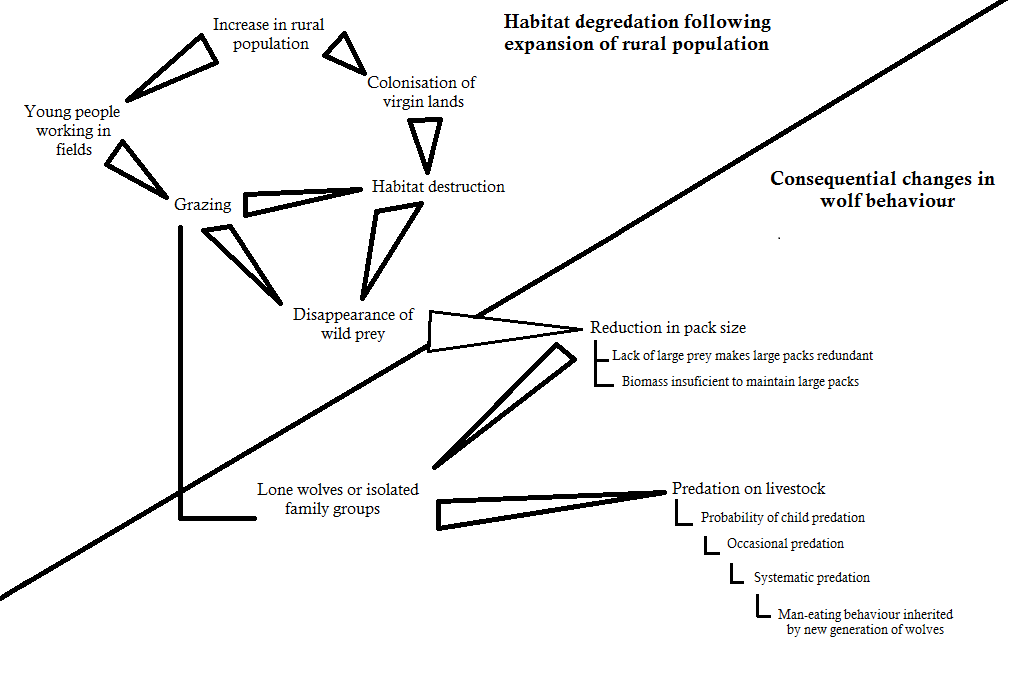
Chart showing the hypothetical stages leading up to wolf attacks on humans in 15th- to 19th-century Italy. While these factors are now largely absent in modern-day Europe, they are still present in rural India, where many attacks took place during the late 20th century.

In France, historical records compiled by rural historian Jean-Marc Moriceau indicate that during the period 1362–1918, nearly 10,000 people were killed by wolves, of whom 6,500 were killed by non-rabid wolves. However, the zoologist Karl-Hans Taake found evidence to believe that many of the alleged French wolf attacks occurring during the reigns of Louis XIV and Louis XV were actually carried out by big carnivores of other species which had escaped from captivity and that the population at the time couldn't tell the difference (Beast of Gévaudan). Numerous attacks occurred in Germany during the 17th century after the Thirty Years' War, though the majority probably involved rabid wolves. Although Italy has no records of wolf attacks after WWII and the eradication of rabies in the 1960s, historians examining church and administrative records from northern Italy's central Po Valley region (which includes a part of modern-day Switzerland) found 440 cases of wolves attacking people between the 15th and 19th centuries. The 19th-century records show that between 1801 and 1825, there were 112 attacks, 77 of which resulted in death. Of these cases, only five were attributed to rabid animals. In Latvia, records of rabid wolf attacks go back two centuries. At least 72 people were bitten between 1992 and 2000. Similarly, in Lithuania, attacks by rabid wolves have continued to the present day, with 22 people having been bitten between 1989 and 2001. Around 82 people were bitten by rabid wolves in Estonia during the 18th to 19th centuries, with a further 136 people being killed in the same period by non-rabid wolves, though it is likely that the animals involved in the latter cases were a combination of wolf-dog hybrids and escaped captive wolves especially when we consider the high level of hybridization of the Eurasian wolf population.

==== Russia and the Soviet Union ====
As with North American scientists later on (see below), several Russian zoologists after the October Revolution cast doubt on the veracity of records involving wolf-caused deaths. Prominent among them was zoologist Petr Aleksandrovich Manteifel, who initially regarded all cases as either fiction or the work of rabid animals. His writings were widely accepted among Russian zoological circles, though he subsequently changed his stance when he was given the task of heading a special commission after World War II investigating wolf attacks throughout the Soviet Union, which had increased during the war years. A report was presented in November 1947 describing numerous attacks, including ones perpetrated by apparently healthy animals, and gave recommendations on how to better defend against them. The Soviet authorities prevented the document from reaching both the public and those who would otherwise be assigned to deal with the problem. All mention of wolf attacks was subsequently censored. For the years 2018 to 2020 the Russian Ministry of Natural Resources put the number of people attacked by wolves at 712 cases.

=== Asia ===
In Iran, 98 attacks were recorded in 1981, and 329 people were given treatment for rabid wolf bites in 1996. Police records collected from Korean mining communities during Japanese rule indicate that wolves attacked 48 people in 1928, more than those claimed by boars, bears, leopards and tigers combined. In the Himalayan region, historical records have reported that 7,600 civilians and soldiers were killed by wolves from 1362 to 1918, of which 4,600 were killed by non-rabid wolves.

==== India ====
Records of wolf attacks in India began to be kept during the British colonial administration in the 19th century. In 1875, more people were killed by wolves than tigers, with the worst affected areas being the North West Provinces and Bihar. In the former area, 721 people were killed by wolves in 1876, while in Bihar, the majority of the 185 recorded deaths at the time occurred mostly in the Patna and Bghalpur Divisions. In the United Provinces, 624 people were killed by wolves in 1878, with 14 being killed during the same period in Bengal. In Hazaribagh, Bihar, 115 children were killed between 1910 and 1915, with 122 killed and 100 injured in the same area between 1980 and 1986. Between April 1989 to March 1995, wolves killed 92 people in southern Bihar, accounting for 23% of 390 large mammal attacks on humans in the area at that time. In 1996, wolves killed 43 people in three districts across Uttar Pradesh. Between March and September 2024, wolves were suspected to have killed at least ten people in Bahraich district in Uttar Pradesh.

=== North America ===
There are no written records prior to the European colonization of the Americas. The oral history of some Indigenous American tribes suggests that wolves did kill humans. Tribes living in woodlands feared wolves more than their tundra-dwelling counterparts, as they could encounter wolves suddenly and at close quarters. Skepticism among North American scientists over the alleged ferocity of wolves began when Canadian biologist Doug Clarke investigated historical wolf attacks in Europe and, based on his own experiences with the (as perceived by him) relatively timid wolves of the Canadian wilderness, concluded that all historical attacks were perpetrated by rabid animals, and that healthy wolves posed no threat to humans. His findings are criticized for failing to distinguish between rabid and predatory attacks, and the fact that the historical literature contained instances of people surviving the attacks at a time when there was no rabies vaccine. His conclusions received some limited support by biologists but were never adopted by United States Fish and Wildlife Service or any other official organisations. Nonetheless, Clarke's view gained popularity among laypeople and animal rights activists with the publication of Farley Mowat's semi-fictional 1963 book Never Cry Wolf, with the language barrier hindering the collection of further data on wolf attacks elsewhere. Although some North American biologists were aware of wolf attacks in Eurasia, they dismissed them as irrelevant to North American wolves.

Wolf numbers consistently dropped across the US during the 20th century, and by the 1970s they were only significantly present in Minnesota and Alaska (though in greatly reduced populations than prior to the European colonization of the Americas). The resulting decrease in human–wolf and livestock–wolf interactions helped contribute to a view of wolves as not dangerous to humans. By the 1970s, advocates of wolf conservation had begun efforts to change public attitudes towards wolves, with the phrase "there has never been a documented case of a healthy wild wolf attacking a human in North America" (or variations thereof (Note: Other variations of the phrase include: "There has never been a single case of a healthy wolf attacking humans in North America." "There's never been a documented case of a healthy wild wolf killing or seriously injuring a person in North America." "No healthy, wild wolf has ever killed a person in North America." "There has never been a documented case of a healthy, wild wolf killing a person in North America," "There is no record of an unprovoked, non-rabid wolf in North America seriously injuring a person.")) becoming a slogan for people seeking to create a more positive image for the wolf. Several non-fatal attacks, including the April 26, 2000 attack on a six-year-old boy in Icy Bay, Alaska, seriously challenged the assumption that healthy wild wolves were harmless. The Icy Bay incident was considered unusual and was reported in newspapers throughout the entire United States. Following the event, biologist Mark E. McNay compiled a record of wolf–human encounters in Canada and Alaska from 1915 to 2001. Of the 80 described encounters, 39 involved aggressive behavior from apparently healthy wolves and 12 from animals confirmed to be rabid.

The first fatal attack in the 21st century occurred on November 8, 2005, when a young man was killed by wolves that had been habituated to people in Points North Landing, Saskatchewan, Canada while on March 8, 2010, a young woman was killed while jogging near Chignik, Alaska. The current position of the United States Fish and Wildlife Service is that wolves are very shy of humans but are opportunistic hunters and will attack humans if the opportunity arises. The agency advises against "actions that encourage wolves to spend time near people".

== Notable cases ==
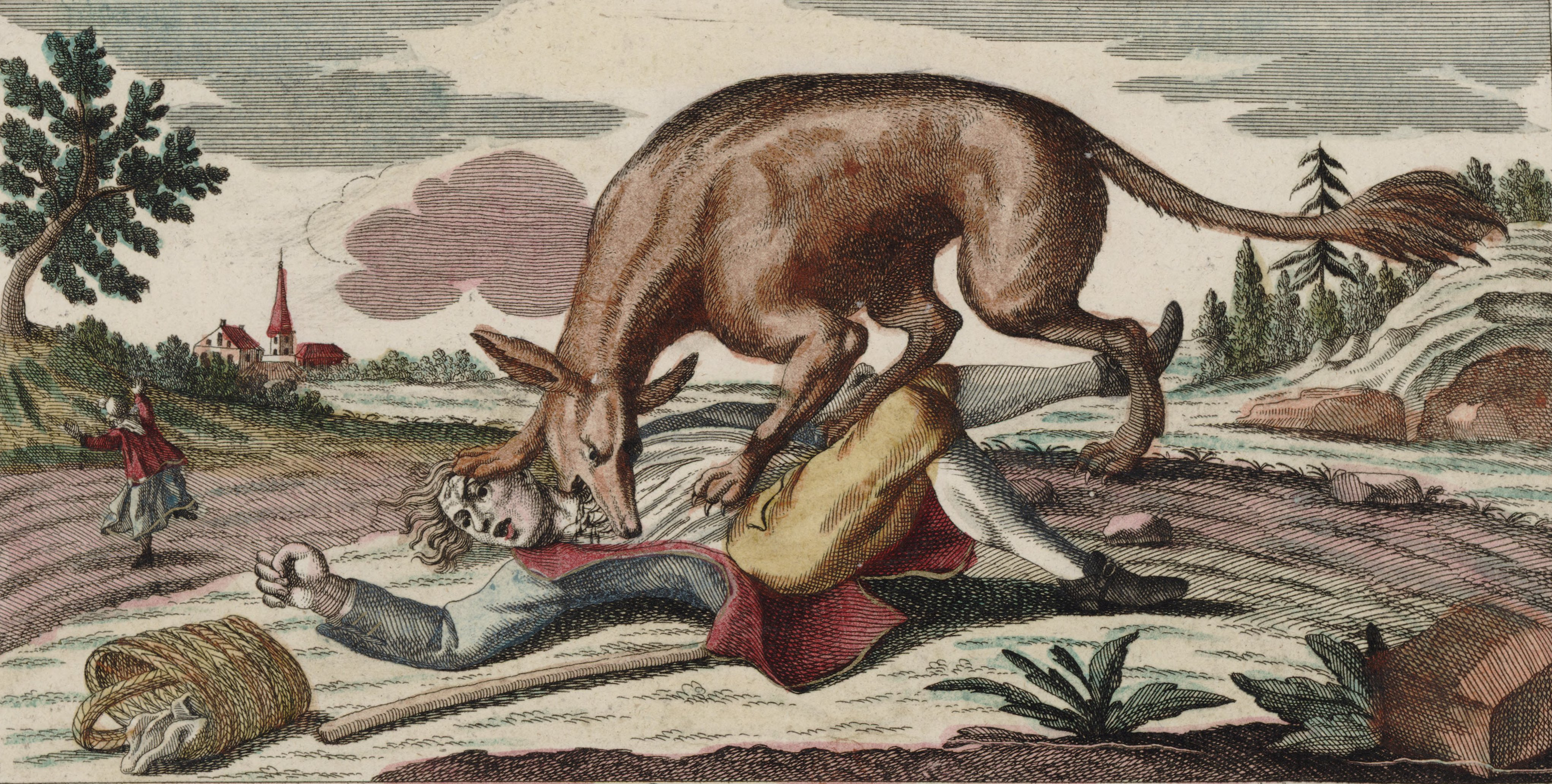
Engraving depicting the beast of Gévaudan (1764)

- Bahraich wolf attacks (India)
- Beast of Gévaudan (France)
- Courtaud (France)
- Kenton Carnegie wolf attack (Canada)
- Kirov wolf attacks (Russia)
- Wolf of Ansbach (Germany)
- Wolf of Gysinge (Sweden)
- Wolf of Soissons (France)
- Wolves of Turku (Finland)

== See also ==
- List of wolf attacks
  - List of wolf attacks in North America
- Coyote attack
- Dingo attack
- Dog attack
- List of large carnivores known to prey on humans

== Bibliography ==
- Graves, Will N. (2007). Geist, Valerius (ed.). Wolves in Russia – Anxiety Through the Ages. Calgary, Alberta, Canada: Detselig Enterprises. ISBN 978-1-55059-332-7.
- Heptner, V. G.; Naumov, N. P. (1998). Mammals of the Soviet Union Vol.II Part 1a, SIRENIA AND CARNIVORA (Sea cows; Wolves and Bears). Science Publishers, Inc. USA. ISBN 1-886106-81-9.
- Linnell, J.D.C.; Andersen, R.; Andersone, Z.; Balciauskas, L.; Blanco, J.C.; Boitani, L.; Brainerd, S.; Breitenmoser, U.; Kojola, I.; Liberg, O.; Loe. J.; Okarma, H.; Pedersen, H. C.; Promberger, C.; Sand, H.; Solberg, E. J.; Valdmann, H.; Wabakken (2002). The Fear of Wolves: A Review of Wolf Attacks on Humans (PDF). NINA. ISBN 82-426-1292-7. Archived from the original (PDF) on 2013-11-09.
- Lopez, Barry H. (1978). Of Wolves and Men. J. M. Dent and Sons Limited. ISBN 0-7432-4936-4.
- Marvin, Garry (2012). Wolf. Reaktion Books Ltd. ISBN 978-1-86189-879-1.
- Mech, L. David (1981). The Wolf: The Ecology and Behaviour of an Endangered Species. University of Minnesota Press. ISBN 0-8166-1026-6.
- Mech, L. David; Boitani, Luigi (2003). Wolves: Behaviour, Ecology and Conservation. University of Chicago Press. ISBN 0-226-51696-2.
- Moriceau, Jean-Marc (2008). Histoire du méchant loup: 3 000 attaques sur l'homme en France (in French). Fayard. ISBN 978-2-213-62880-6.
