= Malbosc =

- Commune
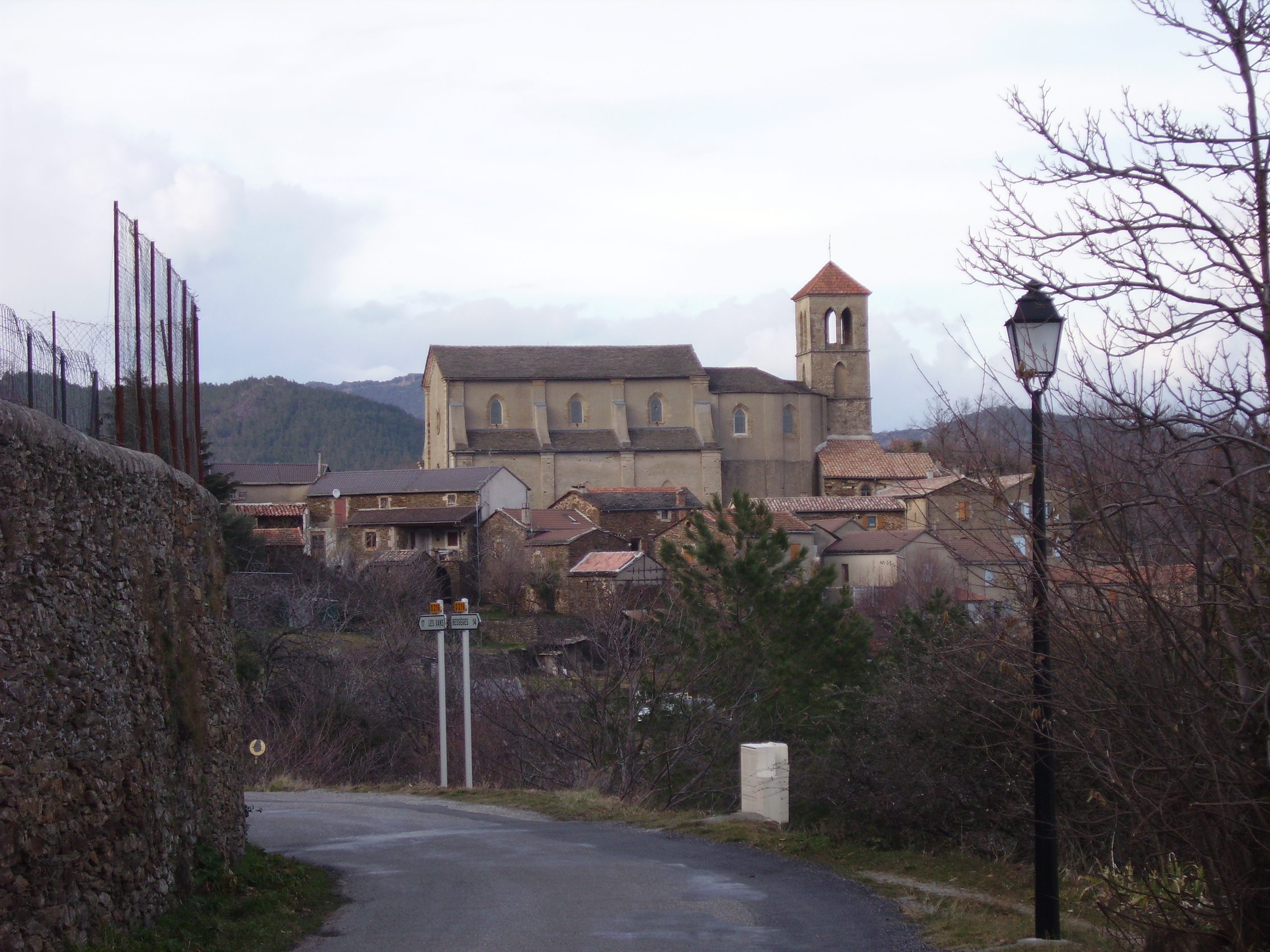
- The church in Malbosc
- Location of Malbosc
- Location within France Location within Auvergne-Rhône-Alpes
- Coordinates: 44°20′48″N 4°04′25″E
- Country: France
- Region: Auvergne-Rhône-Alpes
- Department: Ardèche
- Arrondissement: Largentière
- Canton: Les Cévennes ardéchoises

Government
  - Mayor (2020–2026): Christian Manifacier
- Area^{1}: 21.43 km^{2} (8.27 sq mi)
- Elevation: 450 m (1,480 ft)
- Highest elevation: 907 m (2,976 ft)
- Lowest elevation: 210 m (690 ft)
- Population (2023): 146
  - Density: 6.81/km^{2} (17.6/sq mi)
- Time zone: UTC+01:00 (CET)
  - Summer (DST): UTC+02:00 (CEST)
- INSEE/Postal code: 07148 /07140
- ^{1} French Land Register data, which excludes lakes, ponds, glaciers > 1 km^{2} (0.386 sq mi or 247 acres) and river estuaries.

Malbosc (French pronunciation: [malbɔsk]; Occitan: Malbòsc) is a commune in the Ardèche department in southern France.

== Population ==
Historical population
Year	Pop.	±% p.a.
1968	171	—
1975	157	−1.21%
1982	165	+0.71%
1990	146	−1.52%
1999	169	+1.64%
2007	155	−1.08%
2012	149	−0.79%
2017	145	−0.54%
2023	146	+0.11%
Source: INSEE

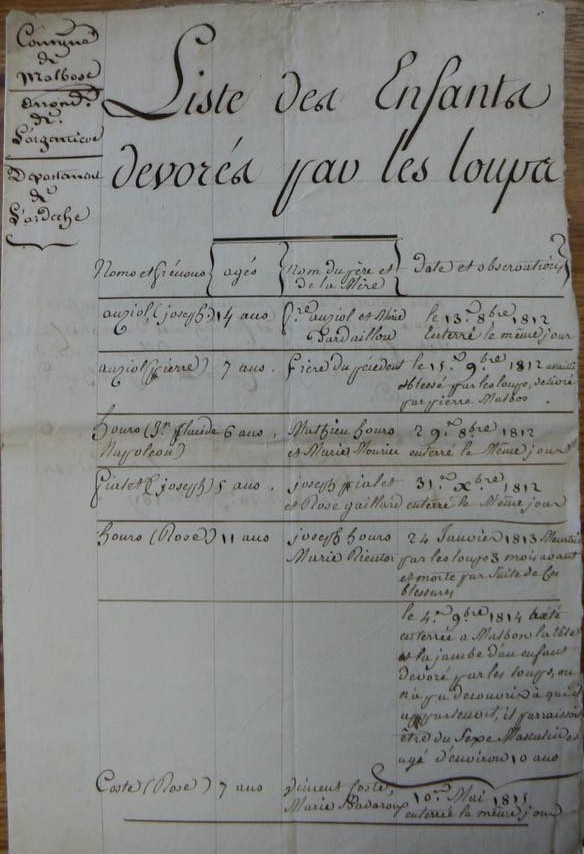
List of children eaten by wolves, commune of Malbosc, from 1812 to 1815

== See also ==
- Communes of the Ardèche department
