= Algabas =

- Location in Kazakhstan Algabas (Asia)
- Coordinates: 43°15′17″N 76°48′05″E
- Country: Kazakhstan
- Region: Almaty Region
- Time zone: UTC+6 (Omsk Time)

Algabas is a village in the Almaty Region of south-eastern Kazakhstan.
