= Kirov wolf attacks =

Series of wolf attacks on humans

The Kirov wolf attacks were a series of man-eating wolf attacks on humans which occurred from 1944–1954 in nine raions (districts) of the 120,800 km^{2} Kirov Oblast of the Russian Soviet Federative Socialist Republic which resulted in the deaths of 22 children and teenagers between the ages of 3 and 17. In all cases, the attacks occurred in the April to December period, coinciding with the wolf's cubbing season.

== Background ==
During World War II, wolves in the Kirov Oblast began to increase in number and develop bold behaviours toward humans, coinciding with the conscription of Kirov hunters into the Red Army, and the requisition of firearms from villages. Wolves were common in all human-inhabited parts of the Kirov Oblast during the War period, including village outskirts. During the War period, the number of cattle and dogs which the wolves usually fed upon in Kirov diminished. Two hundred wolf packs had been counted in the area's forests, and sightings of wolves in the city of Kirov's streets (namely Khlinovskaya, Vodoprovodnaya, and Gorbacheva streets) became common. Wolves were sometimes seen sleeping in the Zarechniy City Park in broad daylight and apparently showed no more fear of humans than feral dogs.

== The attacks ==
=== 1944 ===
In late September 1944 in the vicinity of the Buracovskii settlement, an 18-month-old child was caught by a wolf and carried toward a forest, before being rescued by peasants. Some days later, in a kolkhoz "Giant" in the Mendeleevskiy locality, a pair of wolves ambushed a girl watching a horse in a meadow, biting her and tearing her clothes. On September 21, in the village of Golodaevshchina, 13-year-old Valentina Starikova was carried off by a wolf near a riverbank, while she was watching another wolf attacking a calf on the other side of the bank. A few hours later, a part of her leg was found in a nearby forest. After these incidents, wolves began to chase children systematically: On November 6, in the "New Village" kolkhoz of the Alexandrovsk locality, wolves attacked and dismembered an 8-year-old girl in broad daylight. Two days later at 11:00 AM in the Beretzovskiy settlement, a 14-year-old postwoman named Tamara Musinova was bitten to death by nine wolves. On November 19, 16-year-old Maria Polakova was killed by wolves while returning to work with her sister in a forest clearing of the Ramenskiy locality.

=== 1945 ===
A new series of bolder, more numerous attacks occurring in many of Kirov's localities began in the spring of 1945. On April 29, in the village of Golodayevshchina of the Rudakovskiy district, 17-year-old Maria Berdnikova was attacked by a wolf, concealed by thick vegetation, on a field some 50 metres from stables. When the girl's cries attracted a crowd, the wolf repeatedly picked her up, scaled a 1 metre high wattle fence and left her only after carrying her for 200 metres. As the villagers carried the girl off, the wolf followed them to the edge of the village, ignoring their cries and threatening gestures. The wolf approached the village several times that day, and carried off a lamb the day after. The official who investigated the incident was G.P. Kamenskiy, who postulated that the wolf's daring behaviour was likely explained by the complete absence of hunters or rifles in the village, as arm bearers and firearms had been called to the Eastern Front. On May 1, in the Mamaevschchina village of the Vasilkovskiy locality, 7-year-old Volodya Gorev was grabbed on the throat by a wolf and carried toward a forest. He was released only after a villager fired a shot, and survived the ordeal as his neck had been protected by a thick scarf. Later, in the village of Shiriaevo of the Nemskiy district, 5-year-old Pimma Molchanova was grabbed by a wolf while washing rubber boots with a friend by a rivulet. A rescue party discovered the girl's body 500 metres away from the rivulet with a throat bite and a partially eaten leg.

=== 1946–1951 ===
Between 1946 and 1950, wolf attacks had become a serious problem in several of the Kirov Oblast's districts, namely Darovskiy, Lebiazhskiy, Sovetskiy, Nolinskiy, Khalturinskiy and Orichevskiy. Hunters killed 560 wolves in the Kirov Oblast in 1946, which was considered an unusually high harvest. Within the next three years, Kirov hunters, with the help of hunters from Moscow, managed to kill 1,520 wolves, a task which was rendered difficult by the near lack of transportation to rural settlements in the post-war period. Wolves appeared in the Rusanovo settlement in 1947 and killed a small girl and 13-year-old Veniamin Fokin during the August–September period. A wolf also carried off a small girl, who was with several older girls at a threshing floor. Near the Cherniadievo village of the Rusanovskiy district, 2 wolves attacked Anna Mikheeva and her mother who were treating linen on a field. The mother managed to repel an attack against her with a sheaf, though her daughter was taken. A blood trail led to some thick juniper bushes, where Anna was found with a wounded throat and some flesh of her stomach eaten. A special brigade of hunters arrived to deal with the Rusanovskiy wolves and the attacks ceased in that area. Between the July to August period of 1948, 9 children aged 7–12 had been killed. On November 17, 1948, in the Nolinskiy district, 8-year-old Svetlana Tueva was carried 1 km into a forest by 5 wolves while walking from school with two other girls and a man. The man escaped by climbing a tree, while the other girls ran back to the school. A search of the forest concluded with the discovery of Svetlana's coat. In the July to August period of 1950, 3 girls and a boy aged 3–6 were killed in the Lebiazhskiy district.

==== Suna station attacks ====
During a one-month period in December 1947, a large male wolf took residence in the area around Kirov's Suna station. It walked around villages in the morning and evening hours, catching dogs and attacking solitary people on roads. Before finally being killed, the wolf injured 13 people and killed one woman and an adolescent. When killed, the wolf was measured to be 138 cm in length, and was badly emaciated. A bundle of woman's hair was found in its stomach.

==== Orichevskiy attacks ====
By 1951 the majority of Kirov districts were cleared of man-eating wolves, though Orichevskiy still remained vulnerable. Within that district, in the village of Tarasovka, a 10-year-old girl was killed on April 29, 1951 while washing clothes in a small river. Later, a group of wolves frequently chased children picking mushrooms and berries in the forests surrounding the settlements of Shalegovskiy, Smirnovskiy and Shabalinskiy. On June 12, 1952, 11-year-old Zoe and 15-year-old Lidia Vturina were hospitalised after being attacked in the village of Vturino. On July 11 of the same year, a wolf attacked 5-year-old Vitaliy Ishutin about 1 km from a village, and carried him off into a forest. In the same month, 8-year-old Ludmila Perminova was bitten by a wolf in the village of Koshely. On August 12, 6-year-old Lidia Tupitsina was carried off by a wolf while picking berries in a forest with other children. At 9:00 AM on August 17, 13-year-old herder Alexander Vediakin was carried off by wolves 1 km from the village of Grebenshchiki, but was rescued by land workers. Local hunters believed the animal to have been an old female. On August 16, 1952, a 12-year-old boy picking berries was rescued from a large female wolf accompanied by three cubs. In the spring of 1953, a girl was attacked while walking through a forest with her grandmother. By the end of May, an old, nearly toothless female wolf was killed near the village of Vturino, after which the attacks in Orichevskiy ceased.

=== Last attacks ===
On midday of June 17, 1953, in the village of Sergeitsi, Belskiy district, 12-year-old Sasha Grachev was grabbed by a wolf in a playground, and dragged for 300 metres, before grabbing hold of a branch and managing to extricate himself from the wolf's jaws and run home. This was the last recorded non-rabid wolf attack in the Kirov Oblast, with one rabid attack against three people being recorded in the spring of 1954 in the Urzhumskiy district.
