= Gravières =

- Commune
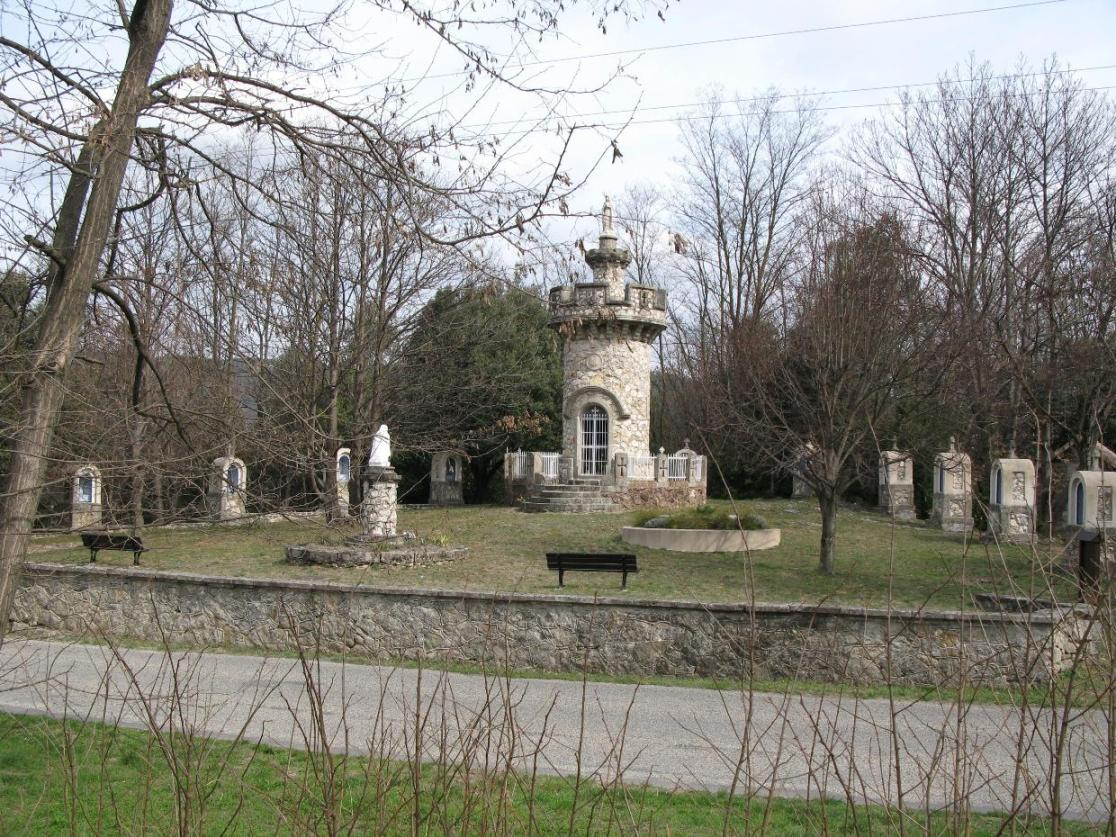
- Sanctuary of Notre Dame de Lourdes

- Coat of arms
- Location of Gravières
- Location within France Location within Auvergne-Rhône-Alpes
- Coordinates: 44°25′20″N 4°05′33″E
- Country: France
- Region: Auvergne-Rhône-Alpes
- Department: Ardèche
- Arrondissement: Largentière
- Canton: Les Cévennes ardéchoises
- Intercommunality: Pays des Vans en Cévennes

Government
  - Mayor (2020–2026): Monique Doladille
- Area^{1}: 18.52 km^{2} (7.15 sq mi)
- Elevation: 220 m (720 ft)
- Highest elevation: 955 m (3,133 ft)
- Lowest elevation: 159 m (522 ft)
- Population (2023): 508
  - Density: 27.4/km^{2} (71.0/sq mi)
- Time zone: UTC+01:00 (CET)
  - Summer (DST): UTC+02:00 (CEST)
- INSEE/Postal code: 07100 /07140
- ^{1} French Land Register data, which excludes lakes, ponds, glaciers > 1 km^{2} (0.386 sq mi or 247 acres) and river estuaries.

Gravières (French pronunciation: [ɡʁavjɛʁ]; Occitan: Gravel) is a commune in the Ardèche department in southern France.

== Geography ==
The commune is traversed by the river Chassezac.

== Population ==
Historical population
Year	Pop.	±% p.a.
1968	459	—
1975	400	−1.95%
1982	381	−0.69%
1990	369	−0.40%
1999	369	+0.00%
2007	350	−0.66%
2012	436	+4.49%
2017	474	+1.69%
2023	508	+1.16%
Source: INSEE

== See also ==
- Communes of the Ardèche department
