= Deshvan =

Deshvan دشوان
- Village
- Location within Iran
- Coordinates: 38°19′00″N 44°32′00″E
- Country: Iran
- Province: West Azerbaijan
- County: Salmas
- Bakhsh: Kuhsar
- Rural District: Shenetal

Population (2006)
  - Total: 269
- Time zone: UTC+3:30 (IRST)
  - Summer (DST): UTC+4:30 (IRDT)

Deshvan (Persian: دشوان, also Romanized as Deshvān) is a village in Shenetal Rural District, Kuhsar District, Salmas County, West Azerbaijan Province, Iran. At the 2006 census, its population was 269, in 49 families.
