= Sikiyaz =

Sikiyaz Сикияз
- Selo
- Location within Bashkortostan Location within Russia
- Coordinates: 55°29′N 58°09′E
- Country: Russia
- Region: Bashkortostan
- District: Duvansky District
- Time zone: UTC+5:00

Sikiyaz (Russian: Сикияз; Bashkir: Һикәяҙ, Hikäyaź) is a rural locality (a selo) and the administrative centre of Sikiyazsky Selsoviet, Duvansky District, Bashkortostan, Russia. The population was 773 as of 2010. There are 6 streets.

== Geography ==
Sikiyaz is located 10 km southwest of Mesyagutovo (the district's administrative centre) by road. Ozero is the nearest rural locality.
