= Shuya (inhabited locality) =

Shuya (Russian: Шуя) is the name of several inhabited localities in Russia.

Urban localities

- Shuya, Ivanovo Oblast, a town in Ivanovo Oblast

Rural localities

- Shuya, Republic of Karelia, a settlement in Prionezhsky District of the Republic of Karelia
- Shuya, Okulovsky District, Novgorod Oblast, a village under the administrative jurisdiction of the urban-type settlement of Uglovka in Okulovsky District of Novgorod Oblast
- Shuya, Valdaysky District, Novgorod Oblast, a village in Roshchinskoye Settlement of Valdaysky District of Novgorod Oblast
- Shuya, Tver Oblast, a village in Rameshkovsky District of Tver Oblast
