= 1765 =

1765 in various calendars
- Gregorian calendar: 1765; MDCCLXV
- Ab urbe condita: 2518
- Armenian calendar: 1214; ԹՎ ՌՄԺԴ
- Assyrian calendar: 6515
- Balinese saka calendar: 1686–1687
- Bengali calendar: 1171–1172
- Berber calendar: 2715
- British Regnal year: 5 Geo. 3 – 6 Geo. 3
- Buddhist calendar: 2309
- Burmese calendar: 1127
- Byzantine calendar: 7273–7274
- Chinese calendar: 甲申年 (Wood Monkey); 4462 or 4255 — to — 乙酉年 (Wood Rooster); 4463 or 4256
- Coptic calendar: 1481–1482
- Discordian calendar: 2931
- Ethiopian calendar: 1757–1758
- Hebrew calendar: 5525–5526
- Hindu calendars
- Vikram Samvat: 1821–1822
- Shaka Samvat: 1686–1687
- Kali Yuga: 4865–4866
- Holocene calendar: 11765
- Igbo calendar: 765–766
- Iranian calendar: 1143–1144
- Islamic calendar: 1178–1179
- Japanese calendar: Meiwa 2 (明和２年)
- Javanese calendar: 1690–1691
- Julian calendar: Gregorian minus 11 days
- Korean calendar: 4098
- Minguo calendar: 147 before ROC 民前147年
- Nanakshahi calendar: 297
- Thai solar calendar: 2307–2308
- Tibetan calendar: ཤིང་ཕོ་སྤྲེ་ལོ་ (male Wood-Monkey); 1891 or 1510 or 738 — to — ཤིང་མོ་བྱ་ལོ་ (female Wood-Bird); 1892 or 1511 or 739

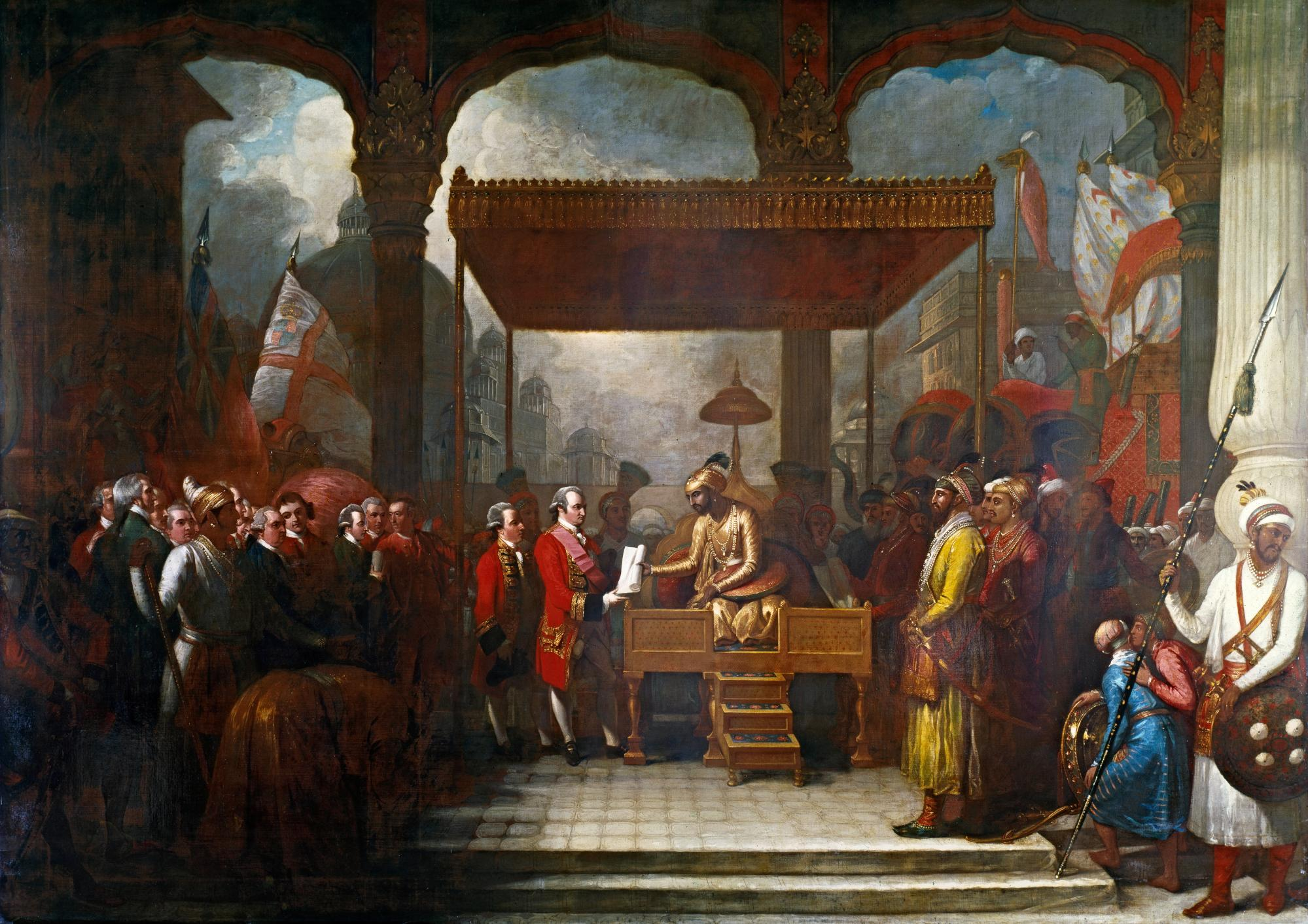
August 16: The Treaty of Allahabad is signed.

1765 (MDCCLXV) was a common year starting on Tuesday of the Gregorian calendar and a common year starting on Saturday of the Julian calendar, the 1765th year of the Common Era (CE) and Anno Domini (AD) designations, the 765th year of the 2nd millennium, the 65th year of the 18th century, and the 6th year of the 1760s decade. As of the start of 1765, the Gregorian calendar was 11 days ahead of the Julian calendar, which remained in localized use until 1923.

== Events ==
=== January–March ===
- January 23 – Prince Joseph of Austria marries Princess Maria Josepha of Bavaria in Vienna.
- January 29 – One week before his death, Mir Jafar, who had been enthroned as the Nawab of Bengal and ruler of the Bengali people with the support and protection of the British East India Company, abdicates in favor of his 18-year-old son, Najmuddin Ali Khan.
- February 8
  - Frederick the Great, the King of Prussia, issues a decree abolishing the historic punishments against unmarried women in Germany for "sex crimes", particularly the Hurenstrafen (literally "whore shaming") practices of public humiliation.
  - Isaac Barré, a member of the British House of Commons for Wycombe and a veteran of the French and Indian War in the British American colonies, coins the term "Sons of Liberty" in a rebuttal to Charles Townshend's derisive description of the American colonists during the introduction of the proposed Stamp Act. Barré notes that "They fled from your tyranny to a then uncultivated and unhospitable country... And yet, actuated by the principles of true English liberty, they met all these hardships with pleasure, compared with those they suffered in their own country, from the hands of those who should have been their friends." American colonists adopt the term for their own organization after reading the accounts of Barré's speech.
- February 14 – Spain's five-member "special junta", appointed by Prime Minister Jerónimo Grimaldi, delivers its report regarding "ways to address the backwardness of Spain's commerce with its colonies and with foreign nations". The report provides detailed orders to be delivered to José de Gálvez, the visitador general in charge of New Spain.
- March 9 – After a public campaign by the writer Voltaire, judges in Paris posthumously exonerate Jean Calas of murdering his son. Calas had been tortured and executed in 1762 on the charge, though his son may have committed suicide.
- March 22 – Royal assent is given to the Duties in American Colonies Act 1765, historically referred to as the Stamp Act, imposing the first direct tax levied from Great Britain on the thirteen American colonies, effective November 1. The revenue measure (which requires the purchase of a stamp to be affixed for validation of all legal documents, but also to licensed newspapers and even playing cards and dice) is made to help defray the costs for British military operations in North America, including the French and Indian War.
- March 24 – Great Britain passes the Quartering Act, requiring unoccupied private households in the thirteen American colonies to house British soldiers if necessary.

=== April–June ===
- April 4 – At Fort Tombecbe, near what is now the town of Epes, Alabama, representatives of the British Empire and of the Choctaw Indian tribe in Mississippi sign a peace treaty in the wake of French cession of claims to the British. A boundary is fixed between land to be occupied by the Choctaws and for lands which British settlers can use; in addition, the British agree to provide a police official and a gunsmith at Fort Tombecbe for the Choctaws to use for trespassing complaints and for weapons repairs. By 1775, however, the Choctaws are outnumbered in Mississippi.
- April 5 – After completing the portion of the Mason–Dixon line marking the semi-circular boundary between Pennsylvania and Delaware, English surveyors Charles Mason and Jeremiah Dixon begin the two-and-a-half-year process of plotting out the 230-mile boundary between Pennsylvania and Maryland along the latitude of 39°43′20″ N.
- April 14 – Three days after getting the news that the Stamp Act has passed, American colonists invade the British Army arsenal near the New York City Hall and sabotage guns inside by spiking them.
- April 26 – At Saint Petersburg, German engineer Christian Kratzenstein presents to the Russian Academy of Sciences a perfected version of the arithmetical machine originally invented by Gottfried Leibniz. Kratzenstein claims that his machine solves the problem with the Leibniz machine has with calculations above four digits, perfecting the flaw where the machine is "prone to err whenever it is necessary to make a number of 9999 move to 10000", but the machine is not developed further.
- May 18 – Not long after British rule has started over the formerly French colony of Quebec, an accidental fire destroys one quarter of the town of Montreal.
- May 26 – During a stroll in the park "on a fine Sabbath afternoon" at Glasgow Green, Scottish engineer James Watt receives the inspiration that provides the breakthrough in his development of the steam engine; he recounts later that "The idea came into my mind, that as steam was an elastic body it would rush into a vacuum, and if a communication was made between the cylinder and an exhausted vessel, it would rush into it, and might be there condensed without cooling the cylinder... I had not walked further than the Golf-house when the whole thing was arranged in my mind."
- June 21 – The Isle of Man is brought under British control, the Isle of Man Purchase Act (coming into force 10 May) confirming HM Treasury's purchase of the feudal rights of the Dukes of Atholl, as Lord of Mann over the island, and revesting them into the British Crown.

=== July–December ===
- July 10 – King George III dismisses George Grenville from the office of Prime Minister of Great Britain, and replaces him with another Whig Party statesman, Charles Watson-Wentworth, Lord Rockingham.
- July 12 – On orders of Chief Pontiac, War Chief Wahpesah of the Kickapoo people releases British Indian Affairs negotiator George Croghan from 35 days of detention. At the same time, Pontiac authorizes a Shawnee Chief, Nanicksah, to sign a treaty with the British on behalf of the Great Lakes tribes, settling the French and Indian War.
- July 13 – Qianlong, the Emperor of China issues a decree that copper engravings be made to depict all of his victories in battle. In the interest of amity with the Chinese, King George III of Great Britain gives priority to the sale of British copper, and King Louis XV of France assents to the use of French artisans.
- July 21 – Having eliminated all of his rivals for leadership of Persia, Karim Khan Zand returns in triumph to his home in Shiraz and makes it his capital then begins construction of citadels, mosques, schools and other buildings.
- July 23 – Headed by Odawa Chief Pontiac and George Croghan, a party of Great Lakes tribesmen and British soldiers travel along the Wabash River and obtain the release of all white prisoners of war remaining in the Miami people and Odawa villages between Ouiatenon (near modern-day Granville, Indiana) and Detroit.
- July 30 – At Yale College, eight students attack the residence of Yale's President Thomas Clap because of his promotion of "New Light" Calvinist doctrine; and "with Evil Intent" and "with Strong hand burst and take off the gates of the yard of the mansion house and Carry away and with Screaming and Shouting... throw into said House Numbers of large stones with Cattles Horns into the windows of said House." The students plead guilty and pay nominal fines, and Clap resigns at the end of the 1765–66 school year.
- August 9 – Russian Empress Catherine II issues a decree authorizing the new way to produce vodka (by freezing).

Map of India in 1765 showing territories loyal to the Marathas (yellow); and the territories of those loyal to the Great Mogul (green)

- August 14 – In protest of the Stamp Act, Bostonians attack the home of official Andrew Oliver.
- August 16 – The Treaty of Allahabad is signed. The Treaty marks the political and constitutional involvement and the beginning of Company rule in India.
- August 18 – Joseph II becomes Holy Roman Emperor.
- August 26 – In protest of the Stamp Act, Bostonians destroy the home of lieutenant governor Thomas Hutchinson.
- September 6 – Jean-Jacques Rousseau's house in Switzerland is stoned by a mob.
- September 21 – François Antoine announces he has killed the Beast of Gévaudan.
- October 17 – The Pennsylvania Gazette reports that a Mr. McCullough, the Distributor of Stamps for the Royal Colony of North Carolina, has resigned his post in protest at the Stamp Act. A Dr. Huston is appointed to the position.
- November 1 – The Stamp Act goes into effect in the thirteen American colonies.
- December 12 – The Pennsylvania Gazette reports that Dr. Huston, the recently instated Distributor of Stamps for the Royal Colony of North Carolina, has resigned his post in protest at the Stamp Act.

=== Date unknown ===
- The first chocolate factory in the Thirteen Colonies is established by Dr. James Baker at Dorchester, Massachusetts.
- It is believed that the first true restaurant opens in Paris, where a tavern-keeper named Boulanger sells cooked dishes at an all-night place on the Rue Bailleul.
- In Lisbon, the auto-da-fé parade (often an excuse for violence against Jews or Christian 'heretics') is abolished.
- Desai Atash Behram is established in Navsari, India.
- Catherine the Great establishes the first secondary education school for non-noble females in Russia: the Novodevichii Institute, for the daughters of commoners.

== Births ==
- January 11 – Antoine Alexandre Barbier, French librarian (d. 1825)
- January 23 – Thomas Todd, Associate Justice of the Supreme Court of the United States (d. 1826)
- February 1 – Charles Hatchett, English chemist (d. 1847)
- February 8 – Joseph Leopold Eybler, Austrian composer (d. 1846)
- February 22 – Meta Forkel-Liebeskind, German writer, scholar (d. 1853)

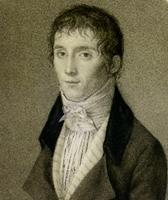
Nicéphore Niépce

- March 7 – Nicéphore Niépce, French inventor (d. 1833)
- March 27 – Franz Xaver von Baader, German philosopher, theologian (d. 1841)
- April 1 – Luigi Schiavonetti, Italian engraver (d. 1810)
- April 6 – Duke Charles Felix of Savoy (d. 1831)
- April 11 – Gertrudis Bocanegra, Mexican national heroine (d. 1817)
- April 26 – Emma, Lady Hamilton, English mistress of Horatio Nelson (d. 1815)
- June 15 – Henry Thomas Colebrooke, English orientalist (d. 1831)
- July 14 – Abigail Adams Smith, firstborn daughter of Abigail Adams and John Adams (d. 1813)
- July 26 – Jean-Baptiste Drouet, Comte d'Erlon, French marshal (d. 1844)
- August 4 – Claire Lacombe, French actress, political activist
- August 6 – Petrobey Mavromichalis, Prime Minister of Greece (d. 1848)

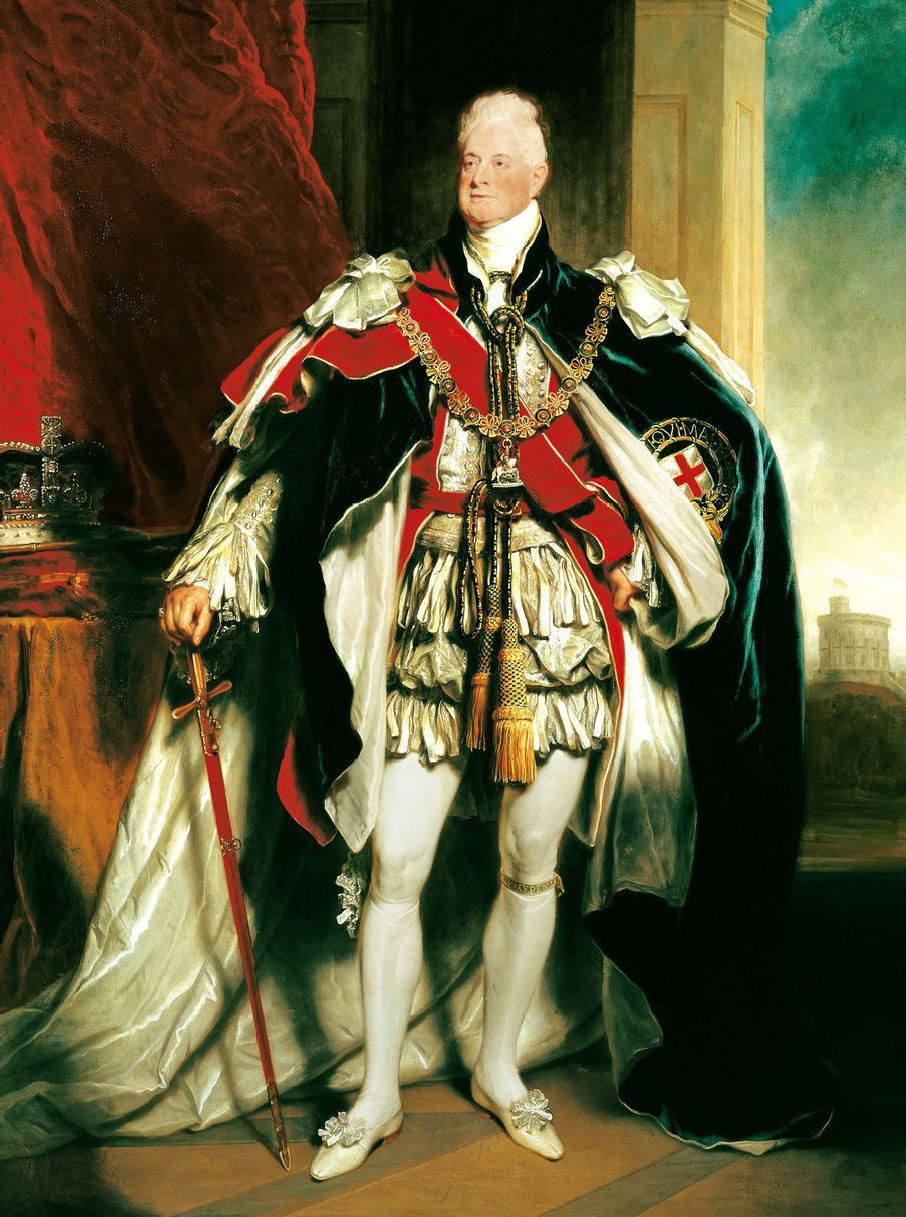
William IV

- August 21 – King William IV of the United Kingdom (d. 1837)
- August 24 – Thomas Muir, Scottish advocate, revolutionary (d. 1799)
- September 16 – Harry Burrard-Neale, British Royal Navy officer and politician (d. 1840)
- September 18 – Pope Gregory XVI (d. 1846)
- September 25 – Michał Kleofas Ogiński, Polish-Lithuanian, and later Russian imperial statesman and composer
- September 29 – Karl Ludwig Harding, German astronomer (d. 1834)
- September 30 – José María Morelos, leader of Mexican War of Independence (d. 1815)
- October 8 – Harman Blennerhassett, Irish-American lawyer (d. 1831)
- October 15 – Sir George Pocock, 1st Baronet, English politician and peer (died 1840)
- October 17 – Henri Jacques Guillaume Clarke, duc de Feltre, French marshal and politician (d. 1818)
- October 18 – Josefa Joaquina Sánchez, Venezuelan embroiderer and independence heroine (d. 1813)
- October 24 – James Mackintosh, Scottish publicist (d. 1832)

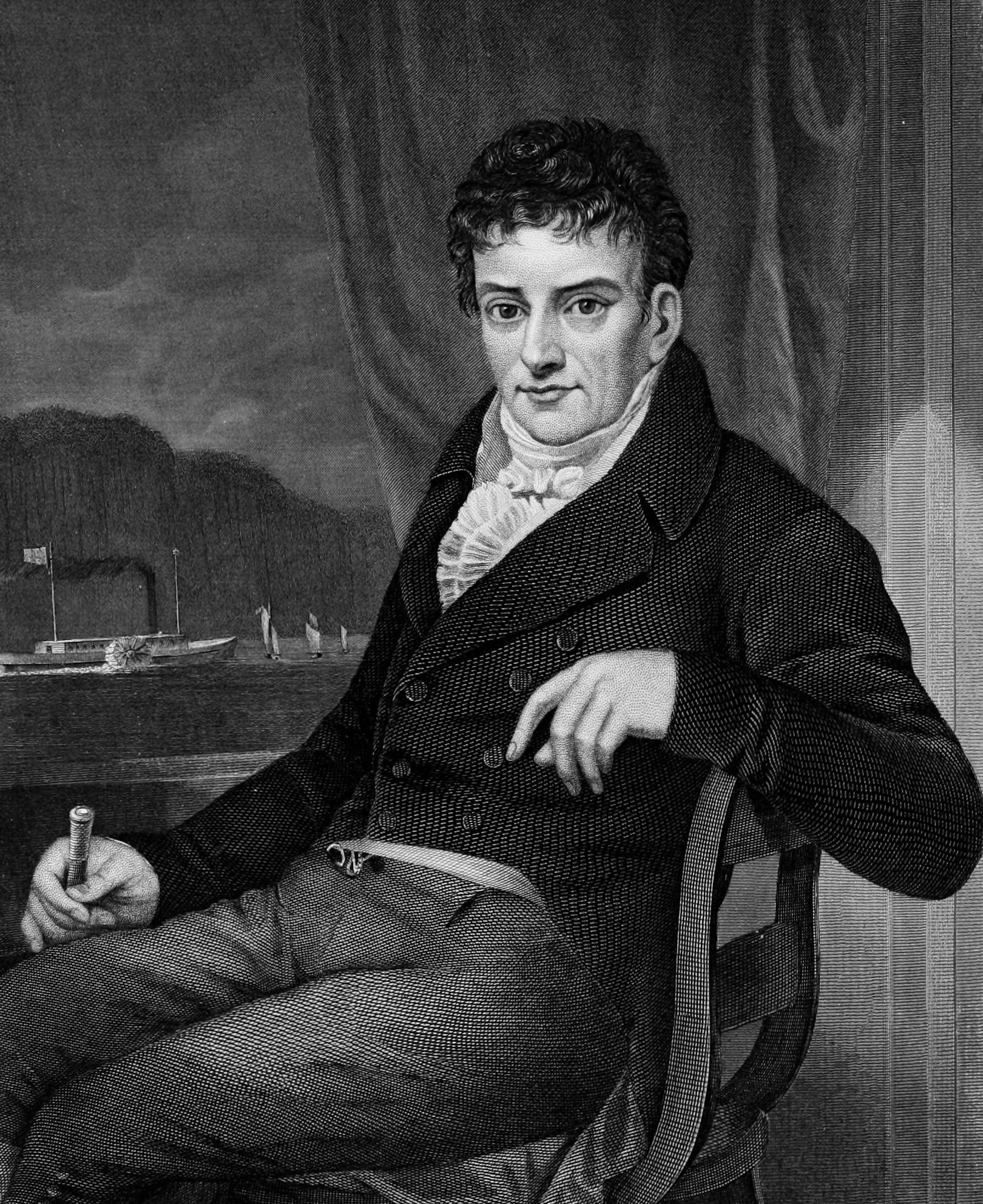
Robert Fulton

- November 14 – Robert Fulton, American inventor (d. 1815)
- November 17 – Étienne Macdonald, French marshal (d. 1840)
- November 19 – Filippo Castagna, Maltese politician (d. 1830)
- November 20 – Sir Thomas Fremantle, British captain and politician (d. 1819)
- November 28 – George William Manby, English author and inventor (d. 1854)
- December 8 – Eli Whitney, American inventor (d. 1825)
- December 22 – Johann Friedrich Pfaff, German mathematician (d. 1825)
- date unknown
  - Mary Bryant, one of the first successful escapees from the fledgling Australian penal colony
  - James Smithson, British mineralogist, chemist and posthumous founder of the Smithsonian Institution (d. 1829)

== Deaths ==
- February 2 – Teresia Constantia Phillips, British autobiographer (b. 1709)
- February 4 – Jean-Jacques Blaise d'Abbadie, Director-general of the Colony of Louisiana (b. 1726)
- February 9 – Elisabetta de Gambarini, English composer (b. 1730)
- March 3 – William Stukeley, English archaeologist (b. 1687)
- March 27 – Arthur Dobbs, Irish politician and governor of the Royal Colony of North Carolina (b. 1689)

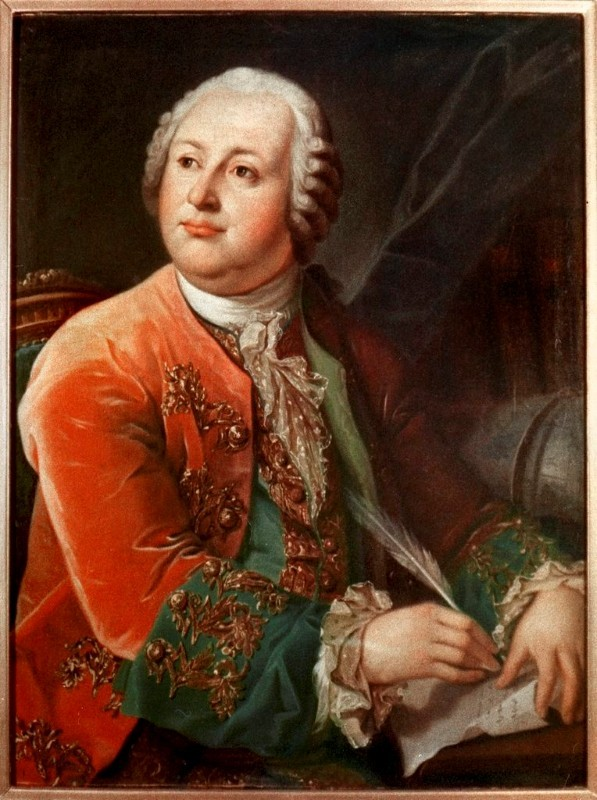
Mikhail Lomonosov

- April 5 – Edward Young, English poet (b. 1683)
- April 11 – Lewis Morris (1701–1765), Welsh hydrographer (b. 1701)
- April 15 – Mikhail Lomonosov, Russian author and scientist (b. 1711)
- April 20 – Abigail Williams, American accuser in the Salem witch trials (b. 1681)
- May 17 – Alexis Clairaut, French mathematician (b. 1713)
- June 21 – Nachman of Horodenka, Hasidic rabbi
- July 15 – Charles-André van Loo, French painter (b. 1705)
- July 18 – Philip, Duke of Parma, Spanish prince (b. 1720)
- August 17 – Timothy Cutler, rector of Yale College (b. 1684)
- August 18 – Francis I, Holy Roman Emperor (b. 1708)
- September 2 – Henry Bouquet, Swiss-born British army officer (b. 1719)
- September 26 – Jean-Baptiste Bénard de la Harpe, French explorer of North America (b. 1683)
- October 10 – Lionel Sackville, 1st Duke of Dorset, Lord Lieutenant of Ireland (b. 1688)
- October 21 – Giovanni Paolo Panini, Italian painter and architect (b. 1691)
- October 31 – Prince William, Duke of Cumberland, English military leader (b. 1721)
- November 30 – George Glas, Scottish merchant and adventurer (b. 1725)
- December 3 – Lord John Sackville, English cricketer (b. 1713)
- December 16 – Peter Frederick Haldimand, Swiss-born military officer and surveyor
- December 20 – Louis, Dauphin of France, heir apparent to the French throne (b. 1729)
- December 25 – Prokop Diviš, Czech scientist (b. 1698)
