= Beast of Gévaudan =

Man-eating animal in the 1760s

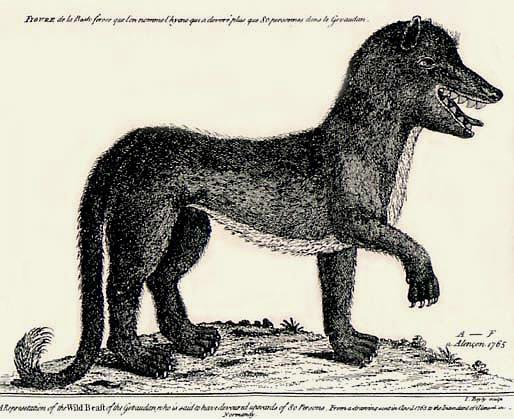
- Artist's conception of one of the Beasts of Gévaudan, 18th-century engraving by A.F. of Alençon Size chart of two of the wolves thought to have been the Beast of Gévaudan

Creature information
- Other name(s): French: La bête du Gévaudan; Occitan: La Bèstia de Gavaudan "Gévaudan Beast"

Origin
- First attested: 1764
- Country: France
- Region: Gévaudan (modern-day Lozère and part of Haute-Loire)

The Beast of Gévaudan (French: La Bête du Gévaudan, IPA: [la bɛt dy ʒevodɑ̃]; Occitan: La Bèstia de Gavaudan) is the historic name associated with a man-eating animal or animals that terrorized the former province of Gévaudan (consisting of the modern-day department of Lozère and part of Haute-Loire), in the Margeride Mountains of south-central France between 30 June 1764 and 19 June 1767.

The attacks, which covered an area spanning 90 by 80 kilometres (56 by 50 mi), were said to have been committed by one or more beasts of a tawny/russet colour with dark streaks/stripes and a dark stripe down its back, a tail "longer than a wolf's" ending in a tuft according to contemporary eyewitnesses. It was said to attack with formidable teeth and claws, and appeared to be the size of a calf or cow and seemed to fly or bound across fields towards its victims. These descriptions from the period could identify the beast as a striped hyena, a large wolf, a large dog, or a wolfdog, though its identity is still the subject of debate and remains unsolved to this day.

The Kingdom of France used a considerable amount of wealth and manpower to hunt the animals responsible, including the resources of several nobles, soldiers, royal huntsmen, and civilians. The number of victims differs according to the source. A 1987 study estimated there had been 210 attacks, resulting in 113 deaths and 49 injuries; 98 of the victims killed were partly eaten. Other sources claim the animal or animals killed between 60 and 100 adults and children and injured more than 30. Victims were often killed by having their throats torn out. Several animals identified as the beast were reportedly killed before the attacks finally stopped.

== History ==
=== Beginnings ===
Burial certificate of Jeanne Boulet in Saint-Étienne-de-Lugdarès (Ardèche), 1 July 1764 (Note: The burial certificate reads: The year 1764 and 1 July was buried Jeane Boulet without sacraments, having been killed by the ferocious beast present Joseph Vigi(er) and Jean Rebour.)

The Beast of Gévaudan committed its first recorded attack in the early summer of 1764. A young woman, who was tending cattle in the Mercoire Forest near the town of Langogne in the eastern part of Gévaudan, saw a beast "like a wolf, yet not a wolf" come at her. However, the bulls in the herd charged the beast, keeping it at bay. They then drove it off after it attacked a second time. Shortly afterwards, on 30 June, the beast's first official victim was recorded: 14-year-old Jeanne Boulet was killed near the village of Les Hubacs near Langogne. On 1 July, this victim was buried "without sacraments" because she could not confess before her death. However, the burial certificate specifies that she was killed by "the ferocious beast" (French: la bette [sic] féroce), which suggests that she is not the first victim but only the first declared. A second victim was reported on 8 August. Aged 14, she lived in the hamlet of Masméjean, in the parish of Puy-Laurent. These two victims were killed in the Allier valley.

From the end of August and in September, other victims were recorded in the Mercoire Forest or its surroundings. Throughout the remainder of 1764, more attacks were reported in the region. Very soon, terror gripped the populace because the beast was repeatedly preying on lone men, women, and children as they tended livestock in the forests around Gévaudan. Reports note that the beast seemed only to target the victim's head or neck regions. Some witnesses claimed the beast had supernatural abilities. They believed that it could walk on its hind legs and feet like humans, that it could perform astounding leaps, and that it could repel bullets and come back from the dead after being struck and wounded.

=== Increased attention ===
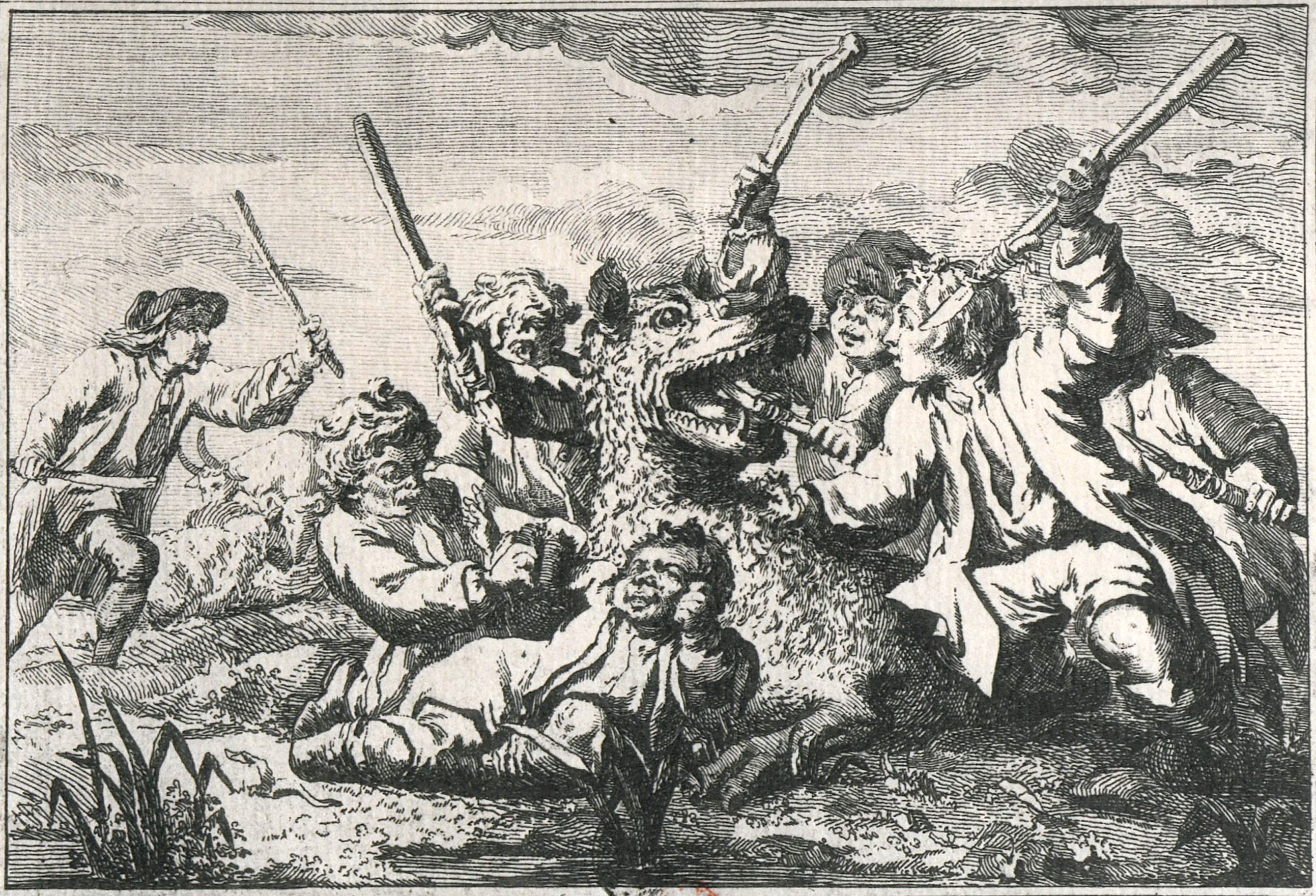
An 18th-century print of the fight of Jacques Portefaix and his companions against the beast. One of the children holds his cheek, partly torn off by the animal.

By late December 1764, rumours had begun circulating that there were a pair of animals behind the killings. This was because there had been so many attacks in a short space of time and because many of the attacks appeared to have occurred or were reported nearly simultaneously. Some contemporary accounts suggest the creature was seen with another such animal, while others report that the beast was accompanied by its young.

On 31 December, the Bishop of Mende Gabriel-Florent de Choiseul-Beaupré, also Count of Gévaudan, called for prayers and penance. This appeal has remained in history under the name of "commandment of the Bishop of Mende". All the priests of the diocese had to announce it to their faithful. In this long text, the bishop described the beast as a scourge sent by God to punish men for their sins. He quoted Saint Augustine in evoking the "justice of God", as well as the Bible and the divine threats uttered by Moses: "I will arm the teeth of wild beasts against them". Following this commandment, prayers of Forty Hours' Devotion were observed for three consecutive Sundays.

In spite of these divine pleas, the massacre continued. On 12 January 1765, Jacques Portefaix and seven children from the village of Villaret, in the parish of Chanaleilles, were attacked by the beast. After several attacks, they drove it away by staying grouped together. The encounter eventually came to the attention of King Louis XV, who awarded 300 livres to Portefaix and another 350 livres to be shared among his companions. The king also rewarded Portefaix with an education at the state's expense. He then decreed that the French state would help find and kill the beast. On 11 February, in the parish of Le Malzieu, was buried a little girl "about twelve years old who had been partly devoured on the present day by a man-eating beast that has been ravaging this country for nearly three months".

By April 1765, the story of the beast had spread throughout Europe. The Courrier d'Avignon and English journalists made fun of the impotence of royal power in the face of a simple animal. Meanwhile, the local bishop and the intendants had to deal with an influx of mail; people from all over France suggesting more or less eccentric methods to overcome the beast. The court also issued depictions of the beast in Gévaudan so that "everyone [was] less terrified at his approach and less likely to be mistaken" and so that the packs of hunting dogs could be trained to chase the beast thanks to an effigy "executed in cardboard".

=== Royal intervention ===
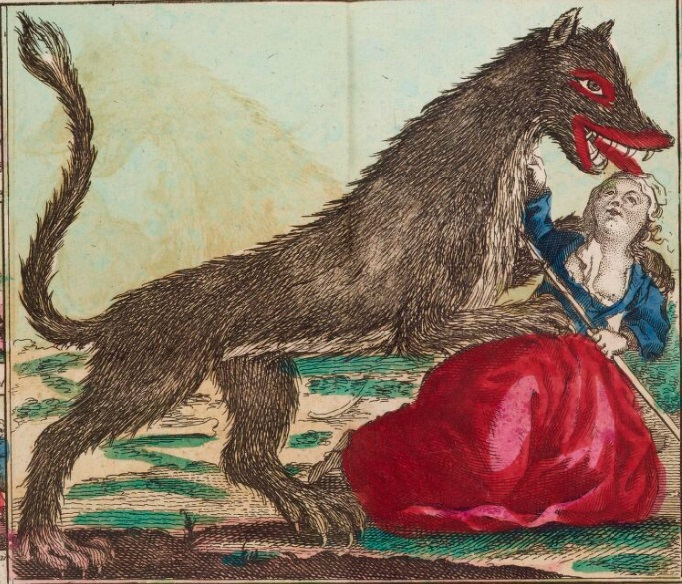
An 18th-century print showing Marie Jeanne Vallet (also known as the "Maid of Gévaudan") defending herself from the beast

First Captain Jean-Baptiste Louis François Boulanger, sieur Duhamel of the Clermont Prince dragoons and his troops were soon sent to Gévaudan. Although extremely zealous in his efforts, non-cooperation on the part of the local herders and farmers stalled Duhamel's efforts. On several occasions he almost shot the beast, but was hampered by the incompetence of his guards. When the village of Le Malzieu was not present and ready as the beast crossed the Truyère river, Duhamel became frustrated.

When Louis XV agreed to send two professional wolf hunters, Jean Charles Marc Antoine Vaumesle d'Enneval and his son Jean-François, Captain Duhamel was forced to stand down and return to his headquarters in Clermont-Ferrand. Cooperating with d'Enneval was impossible as the two differed too much in their strategies; Duhamel organised wolf hunting parties while d'Enneval and his son believed the beast could only be shot using stealthy techniques. Father and son d'Enneval arrived in Clermont-Ferrand on 17 February 1765, bringing eight bloodhounds that had been trained in wolf hunting. Over the next four months, the pair hunted for Eurasian wolves, believing that one or more of these animals was the beast. However, when the attacks continued, the d'Ennevals were replaced in June 1765 by François Antoine (sometimes wrongly identified with his son, Antoine de Beauterne), the king's sole arquebus bearer and lieutenant of the Hunt, who arrived in Le Malzieu on 22 June.

On 11 August, Antoine organised a great hunt. That day saw the feat of the "Maid of Gévaudan". Marie-Jeanne Vallet, about 20 years old, was the servant of the parish priest of Paulhac. In the company of other peasant women, she was taking a footbridge to cross a small stream when the beast appeared. The women took a few steps back but the beast threw itself on Marie-Jeanne. The latter managed to plant her spear into its chest. The beast dropped into the river and disappeared into the woods. The story quickly reached Antoine, who went to the scene. He found that the spear was indeed covered in blood and that the traces found were similar to those of the beast. In a letter to Saint-Florentin, Minister of the King's House, comparing Marie-Jeanne to Joan of Arc, he nicknamed her the "Maid of Gévaudan".

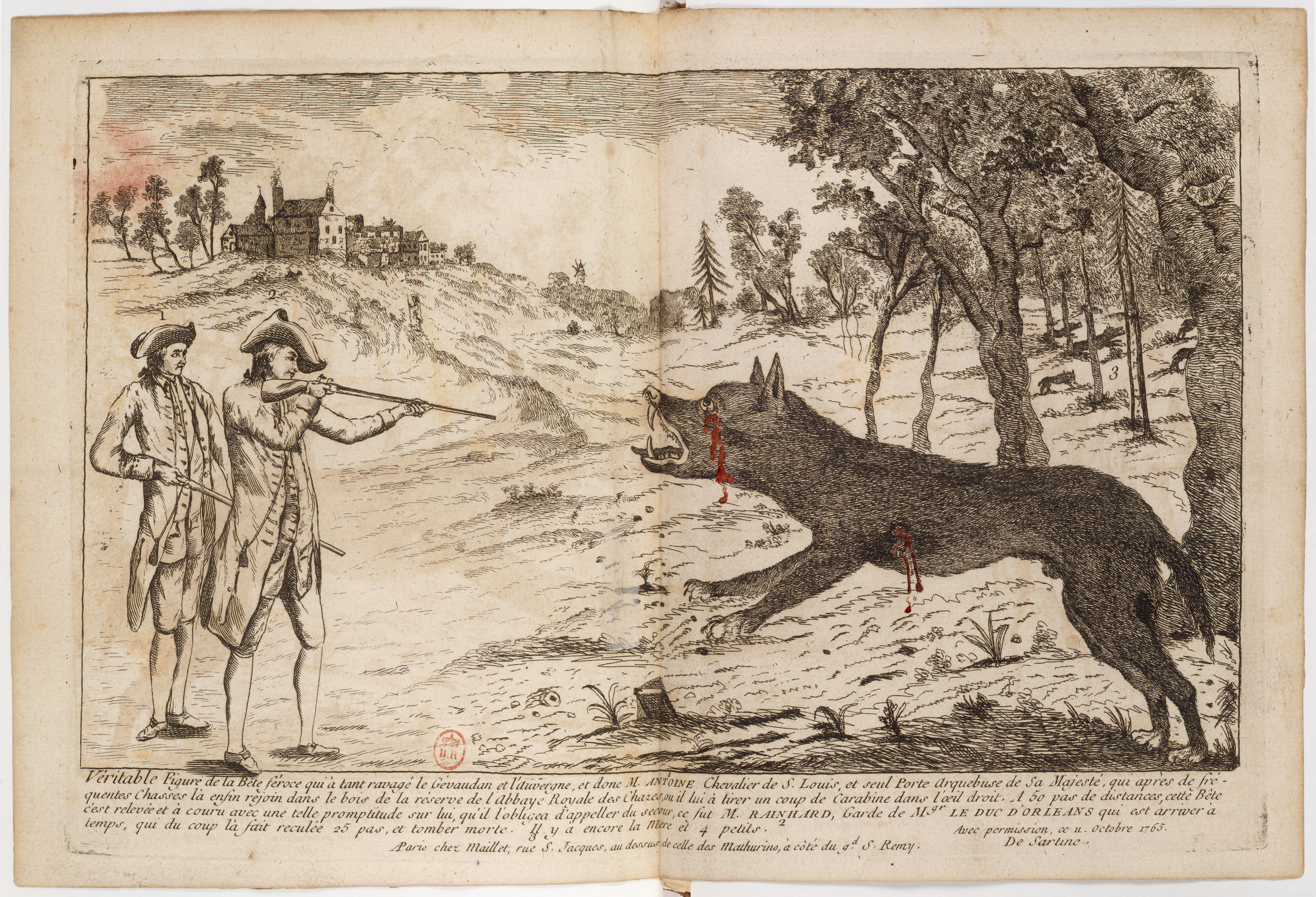
An 18th-century engraving of François Antoine slaying the wolf of Chazes on 21 September 1765

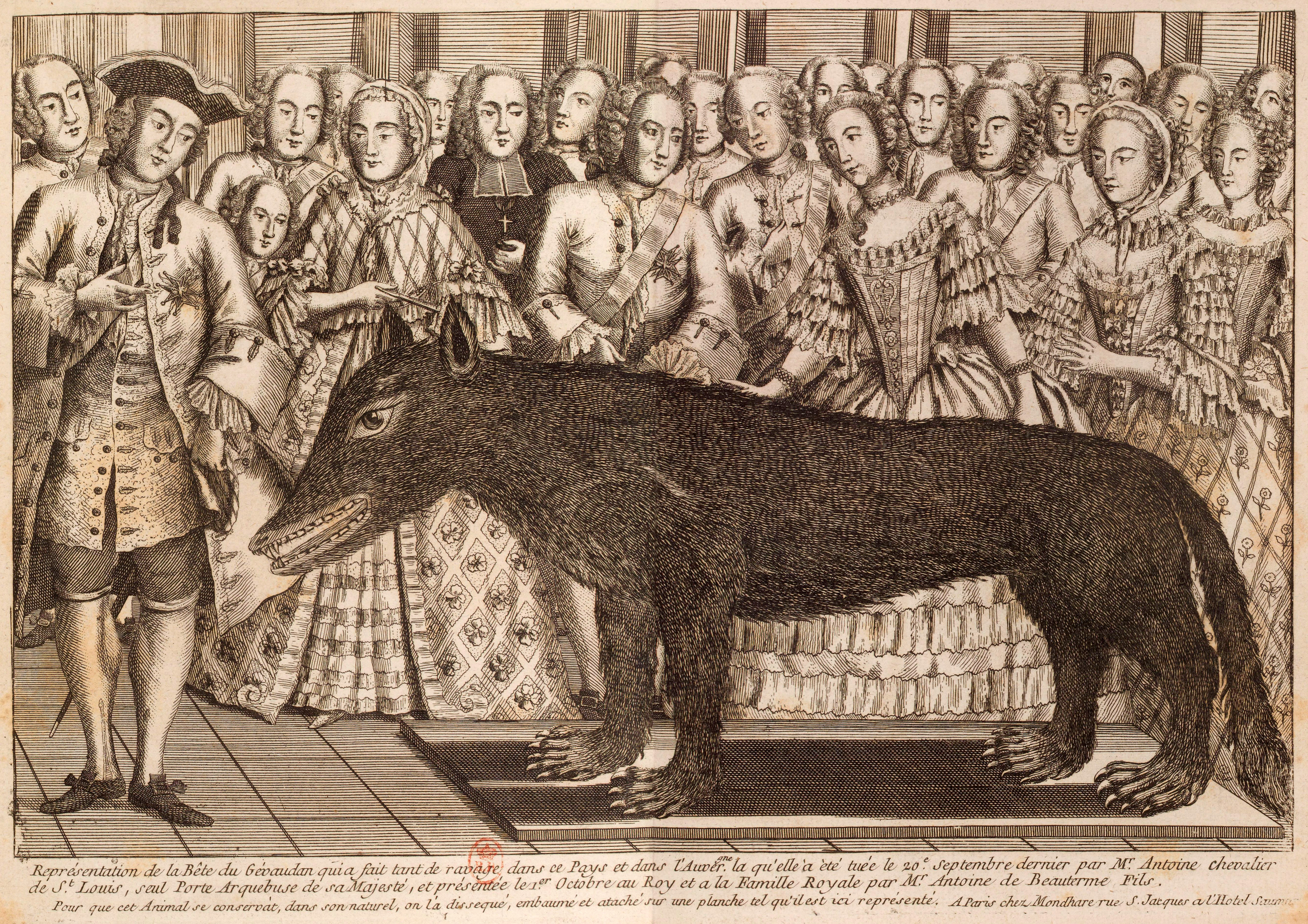
The wolf shot by François Antoine displayed at the court of King Louis XV in Versailles

On 20 or 21 September, Antoine killed a large grey wolf measuring 80 cm (31 in) high, 1.7 m (5 ft 7 in) long and weighing 60 kg (130 lb). The wolf, which was named Le Loup de Chazes after the nearby Abbaye des Chazes, was said to have been quite large for a wolf. Antoine officially stated: "We declare by the present report signed from our hand, we never saw a big wolf that could be compared to this one. Hence, we believe this could be the fearsome beast that caused so much damage." The animal was further identified as the culprit by several attack survivors, who recognised the scars on its body inflicted by victims defending themselves. Among them were Marie-Jeanne Vallet and her sister.

After the report was written, François Antoine's son loaded the animal onto his horse and set off for Paris. At Saint-Flour, he showed it to Monsieur de Montluc. In Clermont-Ferrand, he had it stuffed. He left Clermont on 27 September and arrived at Versailles on 1 October, where he was hailed as a hero. The beast was exhibited in the Jardins du Roi. Meanwhile, François Antoine and his gamekeepers stayed in the Auvergne woods to chase down the beast's female partner and her two grown pups, which had been reported near the Abbey of Chazes. On 19 October, Antoine succeeded in killing the female wolf and a pup, which seemed already larger than its mother. At the examination of the pup, it appeared to have a double set of dewclaws, a hereditary malformation found in the Bas-Rouge or Beauceron dog breed. The other pup was shot and hit and was believed to have died while retreating between the rocks. Antoine returned to Paris on 3 November and received a large sum of money (over 9,000 livres) as well as fame, titles, and awards.

=== Final attacks ===
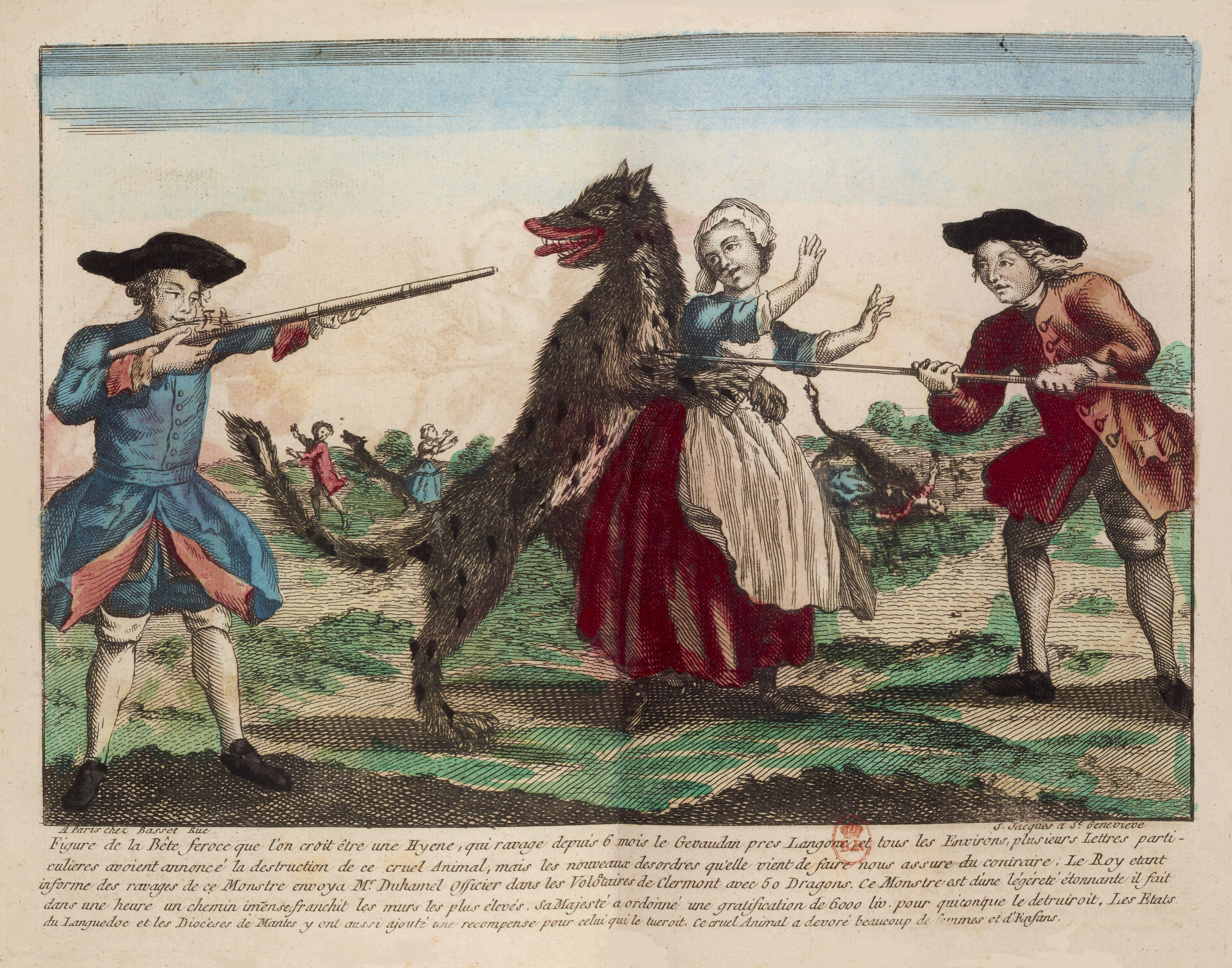
An 18th-century print showing the beast attacking a woman

The month of November passed without any attacks being reported, leading the populace to hope that Antoine had indeed killed the beast. In a letter from 26 November, the syndic Étienne Lafont affirmed to the intendant of Languedoc: "We no longer hear of anything relating to the beast". Before long, however, new attacks were reported around the communes of Saugues and Lorcières, suggesting that the beast was either still alive or had been replaced by another. The first incident, on 2 December, saw the targeting of two boys aged 6 and 12; the beast tried to take the youngest, but it was successfully fought off by the older boy. Soon after, fatal attacks were reported, with a number of witnesses observing that the current beast showed no fear around cattle at all. A dozen more deaths are reported to have followed attacks near La Besseyre-Saint-Mary.

Until the beginning of 1766, the attacks remained sporadic, and no one knew if they were caused by the beast or by wolves. However, in a letter to the intendant of Auvergne on 1 January 1766, Monsieur de Montluc seemed convinced that the beast had indeed reappeared. The intendant alerted the king, but Louis XV no longer wanted to hear about a ferocious beast that, as far as he was concerned, his arquebus bearer had already killed. From then on, newspapers no longer reported any of the attacks that occurred in Gévaudan or in the south of Auvergne.

In March 1766, the attacks multiplied. The local gentlemen now knew that their salvation would not come from the court. On 24 March, the Particular Estates of Gévaudan were held at Marvejols. Étienne Lafont and the young Marquis d'Apcher, a local nobleman, recommended poisoning the corpses of dogs and carrying them to the usual passages of the beast. However, this proved ineffective, as the beast did not seem to cover as much ground as before; rather, it settled in the Trois Monts region, in a 15 km (9.3 mi) area centred around Mont Mouchet, Mont Grand and Montchauvet. Furthermore, the beast's modus operandi had changed; it seemed less aggressive and much more cautious, as revealed by various correspondence, including that of Canon Ollier, parish priest of Lorcières, to Étienne Lafont.

At the beginning of 1767, the attacks experienced a slight lull, but resumed in the spring. With no help coming, the populace no longer knew what to do, except to pray. Local pilgrimages increased, mainly to Notre-Dame-de-Beaulieu (Note: Located in today's municipality of Paulhac-en-Margeride, Lozère) and Notre-Dame-d'Estours. (Note: Located in today's municipality of Monistrol-d'Allier, Haute-Loire) On 18 June, it was reported to the Marquis d'Apcher that the beast had been seen the day before in the parishes of Nozeyrolles and Desges. In the latter, it had killed 19-year-old Jeanne Bastide of the village of Lesbinières. As events transpired, Bastide would be the final confirmed victim of the beast.

=== Killing by Jean Chastel ===
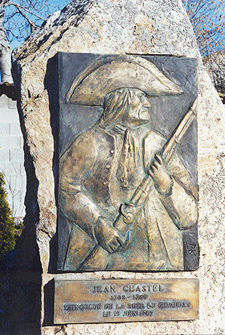
Stele erected in July 1995 in honour of Jean Chastel in the village of La Besseyre-Saint-Mary. Sculpture by Philippe Kaeppelin.

The killing of the creature that eventually marked the end of the attacks is credited to a local hunter named Jean Chastel, who shot it at the slopes of Mont Mouchet (now called la Sogne d'Auvers) during a hunt organised by the Marquis d'Apcher on 19 June 1767. In 1889, Abbot Pourcher told the edifying oral tradition which said that the pious hero Chastel shot the creature after reciting his prayers, but this is not backed up by contemporary reports. The story about the large-caliber silver bullets, made from melted-down medals of the Virgin Mary, is a literary invention by the French writer Henri Pourrat.

The body was then loaded onto a horse and brought to the Château de Besque of the Marquis d'Apcher, located in Charraix, where it was necropsied by Dr. Boulanger, a surgeon at Saugues. Dr. Boulanger's post-mortem report on the animal, along with survivors' testimony of the beast's attacks, was transcribed by the royal notary Roch Étienne Marin and is known as the "Marin Report". The results of the examination were consistent with a large wolf or wolf-dog, but the remains were incomplete by the time Boulanger acquired them, precluding conclusive identification of the animal. The beast was then exhibited at the château for about 12 days, where the Marquis d'Apcher lavishly received the crowds that thronged to see the remains.

=== Fate of the remains ===
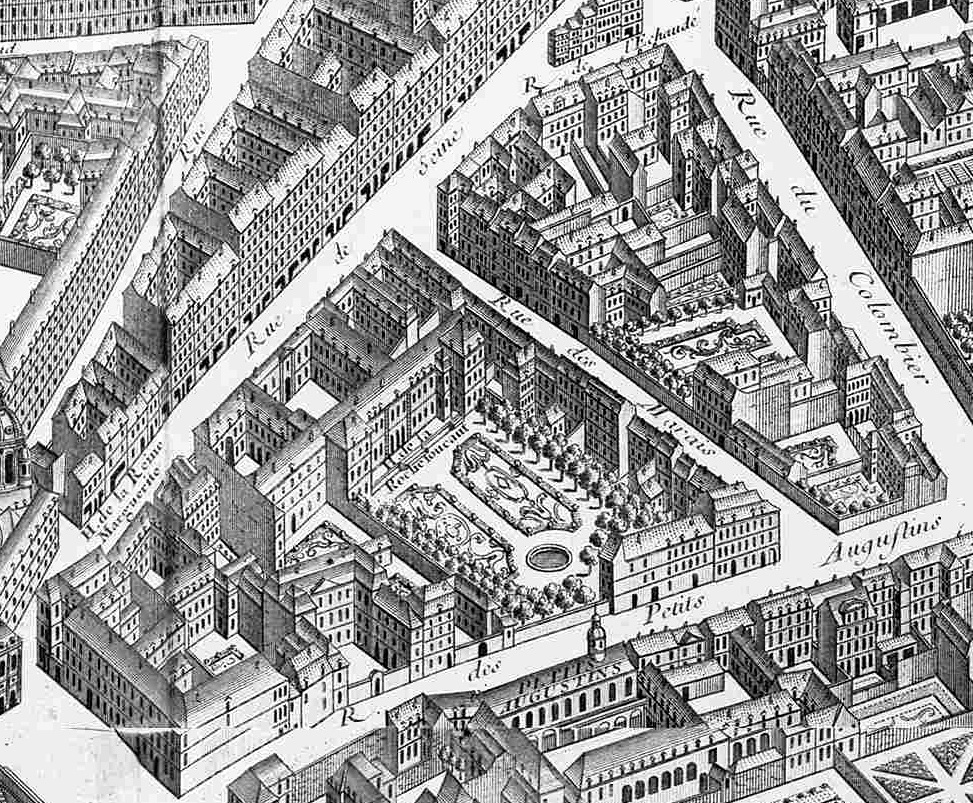
The hotel of La Rochefoucauld represented on the Turgot map (1739). The remains of the beast killed by Jean Chastel were probably buried in the garden of this hôtel particulier. The layout of the garden is visible in the centre of the engraving.

The Marquis d'Apcher instructed a servant named Gibert to take the beast to Versailles to show it to the king. According to an oral tradition reported by Abbot Pourcher and repeated by several authors, Jean Chastel accompanied Gibert, but Louis XV disdainfully rejected them because the remains, summarily stuffed by an apothecary who had contented himself with replacing the entrails with straw, gave off a stench that the heat made even more unbearable. The animal was then reportedly buried within either the grounds of Versailles or of the Chateau de Marly. However, this version has been called into question due to the testimony of a servant of the Marquis d'Apcher, collected in 1809:

Gibert finally arrived in Paris, went to stay at the hôtel particulier of Mr. de la Rochefoucault to whom he at the same time gave a letter in which Mr. d'Apchier begged the lord to inform the king of the happy deliverance of the monster (...) The king was at Compiègne at the time and, according to the news he was told, he gave orders to Mr. de Buffon to visit and examine this animal. This naturalist, in spite of the dilapidation to which the worms had reduced it and the fall of all the hairs, following the heat of the end of July and the beginning of August, in spite of still the bad odor which it gave off, after a serious examination, judged that it was only a big wolf (...) As soon as Mr. de Buffon had made the examination of this animal, Gibert hastened to have it buried because of its great stench and he said he had been so inconvenienced by it that he was sick and bedridden for more than 15 days in Paris. He suffered from this disease for more than 6 years and he even attributed to this bad smell that he breathed for so long the poor health he has always been burdened with since that time.

According to the servant's account, Jean Chastel did not accompany Gibert to Paris. Likewise, the king was not in Paris to receive Gibert, instead sending the Comte de Buffon, who himself left no record of the event, to examine the remains. Rather than being buried at Versailles or Marly, or alternately kept in the Jardin du Roi's natural history collection, the beast was probably buried in the garden of a private mansion owned by Louis Alexandre de La Rochefoucauld, a gentleman sharing a distant common ancestor with the Marquis d'Apcher. La Rochefoucauld's mansion, located on the Rue de Seine, would be demolished in 1825.

After Chastel's beast was shot, the attacks seem to have stopped for good. Jean Chastel was granted 72 livres from the diocese on 9 September, while fellow hunter Jean Terrisse received 78 livres on 17 September. The remaining hunters who had accompanied them on the hunt were granted a shared sum of 312 livres on 3 May 1768.

== Description ==
=== Morphology ===
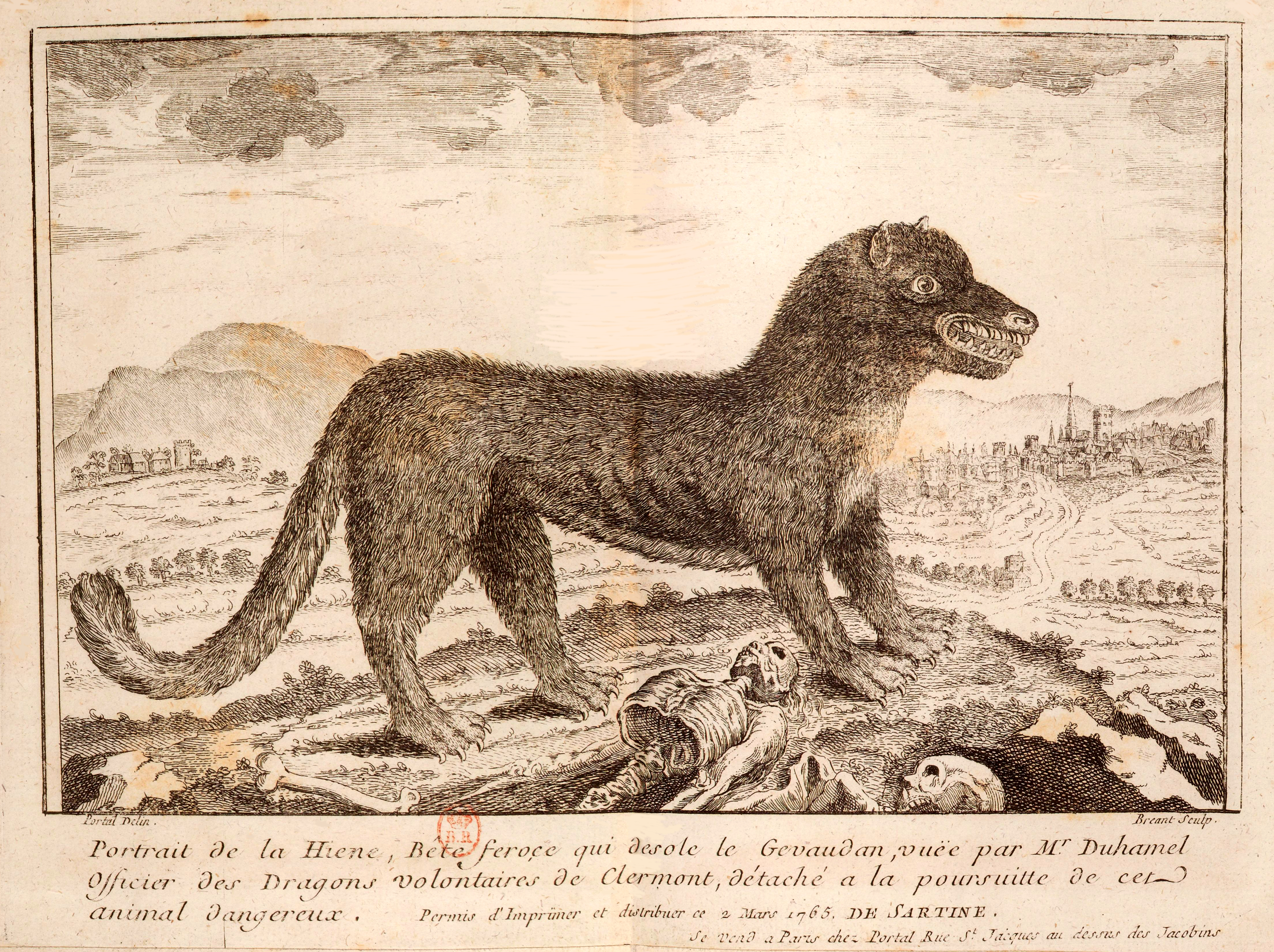
An 18th-century print describing the beast as a hyena. (Note: The description reads: Portrait of the Hyena, ferocious Beast that desolates the Gevaudan, seen by Mr. Duhamel Officer of the Dragoons volunteers of Clermont, detached to the pursuit of this dangerous animal.) Collection of the National Library of France (BnF).

Various questions about the nature of the Beast of Gévaudan have aroused interest and contributed to the enthusiasm for its history. Descriptions of the time vary, and reports may have been greatly exaggerated, owing to public hysteria. In terms of morphology, although none of the killed animals have been preserved, the beast was generally described as a wolf-like canine with a tall, lean frame capable of taking great strides. It was said to be the size of a calf, a cow, or, in some cases, a horse. It had an elongated head similar to that of a greyhound, with a flattened snout, pointed ears, and a wide mouth sitting atop a broad chest. The beast's tail was also reported to have been notably longer than a wolf's, with a prominent tuft at the end. The beast's fur was described as tawny or russet in colour but its back was streaked with black, and a white heart-shaped pattern was noted on its underbelly.

=== Behaviour ===
Several accounts claimed the beast was, or seemed, invulnerable, as it was said to pick itself up and escape after being hit by the bullets of reputedly skilled marksmen. The beast was also said to be extremely agile, said to be able to easily jump over walls that a dog would have trouble with. In addition, it was held that the beast seemed to be everywhere at once; it was reported to sometimes make two or more attacks in one day, in locations several kilometres from each other. However, in many cases, these distances could be covered by a single animal within a reasonable period of time. Two of the beast's most singular traits were its familiarity and its boldness. It was also reported that, at least until François Antoine's departure, the beast seemed to have no fear of man. When it encountered resistance, it would move "40 paces" away, sometimes sitting on its hindquarters for a few moments, and, if not pursued, would attack again. Then it would move away at a walk or a short trot. Several victims were attacked in the middle of villages (Note: According to Michel Louis, 22% of the victims were attacked in the middle of villages.) and most of the testimonies related to attacks during the day. Finally, the beast was noted for being unusually aggressive, with some feeling that its attacks were too determined and ferocious to be driven entirely by hunger.

== The "Marin Report" ==
On 20 June 1767, the day after the death of the animal killed by Jean Chastel, the royal notary Roch Étienne Marin wrote an autopsy report at the Marquis d'Apcher's Château de Besque in Charraix. Preserved in the French National Archives, this memoir was discovered in 1952 by the historian Élise Seguin. It provides precise information on "This animal which seemed to us to be a wolf; But extraordinary and very different by its figure and its proportions from the wolves that one sees in this country."

The report also details the dental formula. The upper jaw consists of 20 teeth: 6 incisors, 2 canines and 12 molars; the lower jaw has 22: 6 incisors, 2 canines and 14 molars. This likely points to a canid. The document also describes the animal's wounds and scars. Finally, it includes the testimonies of several people who recognised it.

Report of the examination of the animal's body addressed to the intendant of Auvergne on 20 June 1767. French National Archives, AE/II/2927.

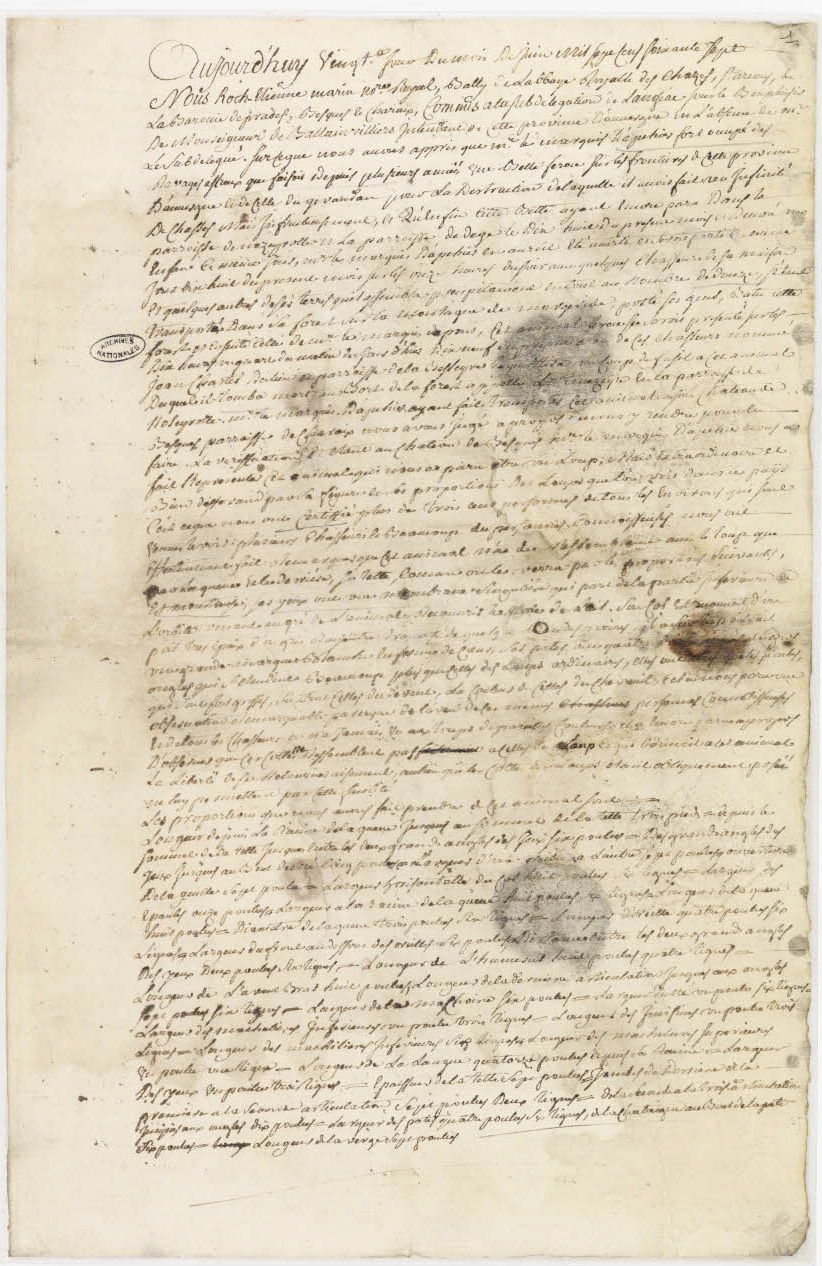

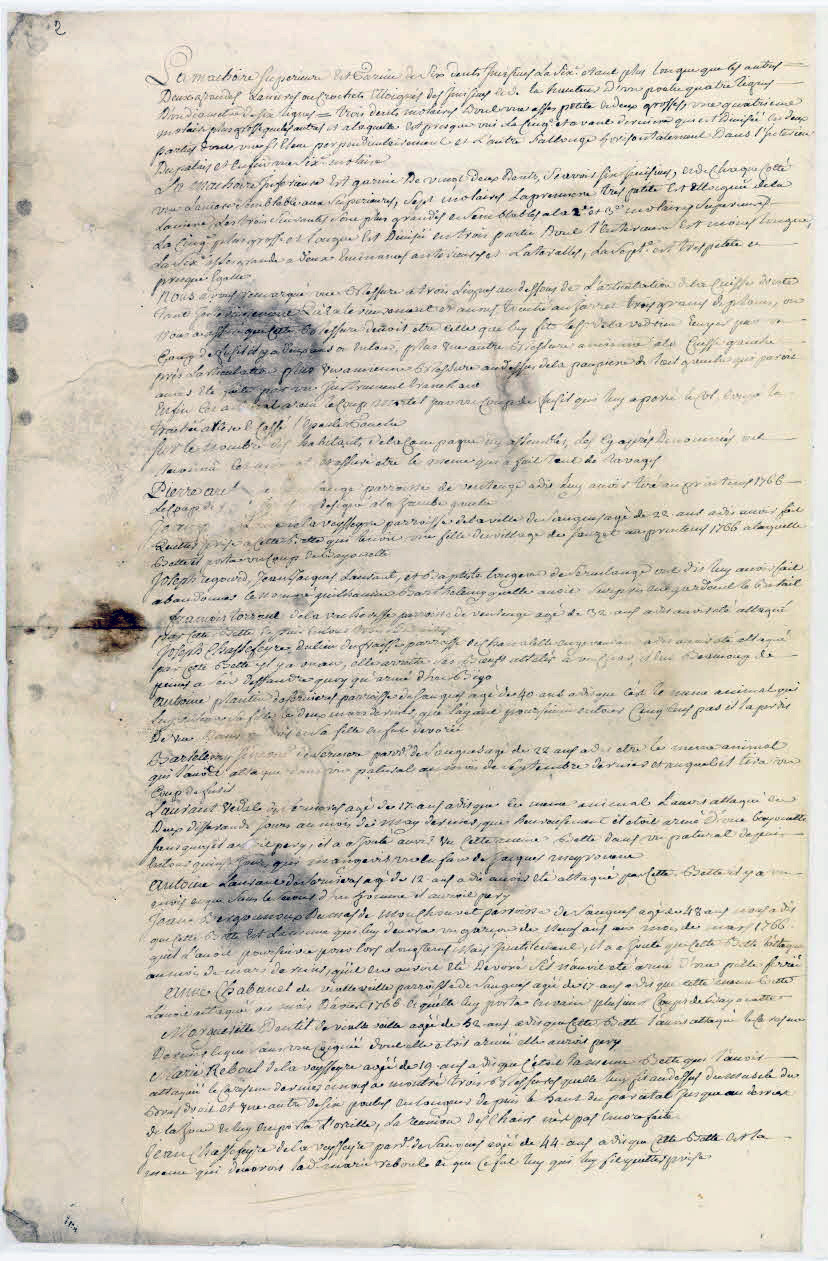

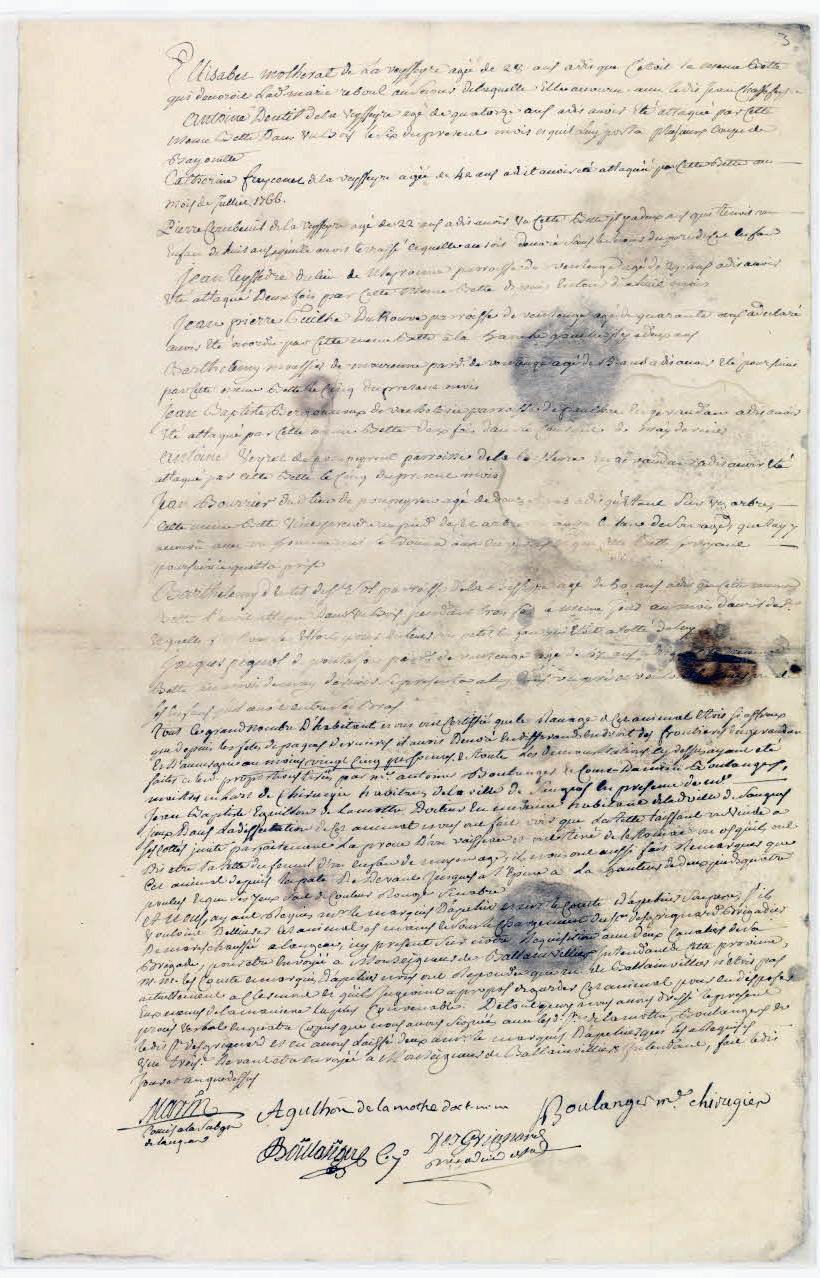

== Hypotheses ==
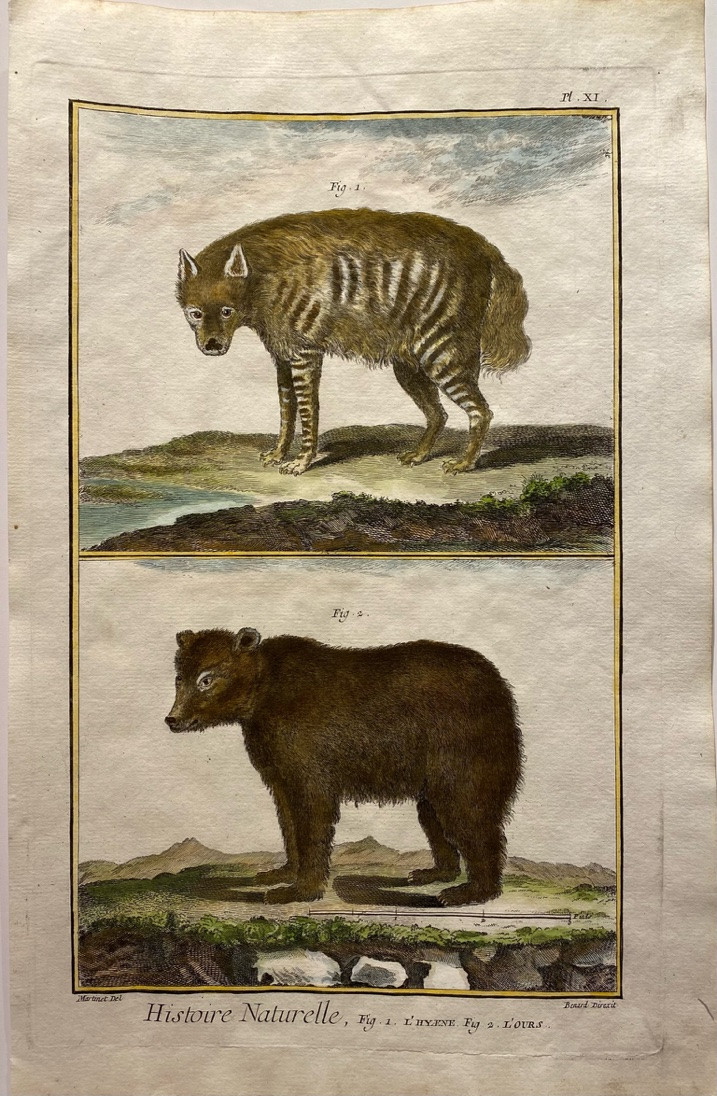
Depiction of a hyena and a bear in the Encyclopédie ou Dictionnaire raisonné des sciences, des arts et des métiers, 1754

According to modern scholars, public hysteria at the time of the attacks likely contributed to the widespread belief that a supernatural beast or beasts roamed Gévaudan. However, the deaths attributed to the beast(s) were more likely to have been the work of one or more individual wolves or wolf packs.

Attacks by wolves were a very serious problem during the era, not only in France but throughout Europe, with thousands of deaths attributed to wolves in the 18th century alone. In the spring of 1765, in the midst of the Gévaudan hysteria, an unrelated series of attacks occurred near the commune of Soissons, northeast of Paris, when a single wolf killed at least four people over a period of two days before being tracked and killed by a man armed with a pitchfork. In a 2021 talk by François-Louis Pelissier, it was argued that, based on descriptions of the beast's appearance and behaviour, as well as inferred historical distribution, that the most likely candidate for the beast was an Italian wolf (Canis lupus italicus). These wolves are known to have a reddish summer pelt, dark stripes on their backs and tails, and a distinctive skull shape compared to other wolves, which somewhat tally with contemporary descriptions of the beast.

The Marin Report itself, while admittedly working from a decaying, incomplete specimen, describes the creature as a wolf of unusually large proportions: "This animal which seemed to us to be a wolf; But extraordinary and very different by its figure and its proportions from the wolves that one sees in this country. This is what we have certified by more than three hundred people from all around who came to see it."

Despite the general consensus that the beast was a wolf or another wild canid, several alternative theories for its identity have been proposed. Some think it was a sub-adult male lion that had escaped from a menagerie, due to the beast's size and some descriptions seeming closer to a lion than a wolf. Others believe it was an escaped striped hyena, due to some drawings of the beast describing it as such. Another theory is that a large feral dog or wolfdog was responsible, since some witnesses described the beast as looking similar to a wolf, but at the same time being noticeably different. Others suggest the beast might have been a maned wolf that escaped from a zoo, based on its coloration and the description of its proportions, though there is no proof of a maned wolf having escaped containment near Gévaudan.

== In popular culture ==
- The Beast of Gévaudan is the main subject of the French video game La Bête du Gévaudan (1985).
- Brotherhood of the Wolf (2001), directed by Christophe Gans, is an action film based on the legend. In the film, the Beast is a lion dressed up in armor to mask its identity.
- In 2022, German power metal band Powerwolf released a single titled "Beast of Gévaudan".
- The Beast is a central antagonist of the 2025 Metroidvania video game Chronicles of the Wolf, in which it is a werewolf.

== See also ==
- List of wolf attacks
- List of wolves
- Peluda, or the Shaggy Beast
- Wolf of Ansbach
- Courtaud
