= Brotherhood of the Wolf =

2001 film by Christophe Gans

- French theatrical release poster
- Directed by: Christophe Gans
- Written by: Christophe Gans; Stéphane Cabel
- Produced by: Richard Grandpierre; Samuel Hadida
- Starring: Samuel Le Bihan; Vincent Cassel; Émilie Dequenne; Monica Bellucci; Jérémie Renier; Mark Dacascos
- Narrated by: Jacques Perrin
- Cinematography: Dan Laustsen
- Edited by: David Wu; Sébastien Prangère; Xavier Loutreuil
- Music by: Joseph LoDuca
- Production companies: StudioCanal; Davis Films; Eskwad
- Distributed by: Metropolitan Filmexport
- Release date: 31 January 2001
- Running time: 142 minutes
- Country: France
- Language: French
- Budget: Fr200 million (€32 million); US$29 million
- Box office: $70.8 million

Brotherhood of the Wolf (French: Le Pacte des loups) is a 2001 French period action horror film directed by Christophe Gans, co-written by Gans and Stéphane Cabel, and starring Samuel Le Bihan, Mark Dacascos, Émilie Dequenne, Monica Bellucci and Vincent Cassel. The story takes place in 18th-century France, where the Chevalier de Fronsac and Mani, an Iroquois man, are sent to investigate the mysterious slaughter of hundreds by an unknown creature in the county of Gévaudan.

The plot is loosely based on a real-life series of killings that took place in France in the 18th century and the famous legend of the beast of Gévaudan; parts of the film were shot at Château de Roquetaillade. The film has several extended swashbuckling fight scenes, with martial arts performances by the cast mixed in, making it unusual for a historical drama. The special effects for the creature are a combination of computer generated imagery, as well as puppetry and animatronics designed by Jim Henson's Creature Shop.

The film received generally positive critical reviews, highlighting its high production values, cinematography, performances and Gans's atmospheric direction. At a $29 million budget, it was a commercial success, grossing over $70 million in worldwide theatrical release. The film also became the sixth-highest-grossing French-language film of all time in the United States, and it also became one of the biggest international successes for French-language films. The film's 4K restored "Director's Cut" version premiered in the Official Selection of 2022 Cannes Film Festival.

== Plot ==
During the French Revolution, Marquis d'Apcher writes his memoirs in his castle. He recounts his experiences in 1764, when a mysterious beast terrorized the county, or historical area, of Gévaudan. Grégoire de Fronsac, a knight and the royal naturalist of King Louis XV, and his Iroquois companion Mani, arrive to capture the beast. Fronsac becomes interested in Marianne de Morangias, the daughter of a local count, whose brother, Jean-François, was also an avid hunter and a world traveller, whose arm was mangled and rendered useless while overseas. Fronsac is also intrigued by Sylvia, an Italian courtesan at the local brothel.

While investigating another victim, Fronsac finds a fang made of steel. A traumatized child witness swears that the beast is controlled by what seems to be a human master. As the investigation proves unfruitful, the king's weapons master, Lord de Beauterne, arrives to put an end to the beast, and Fronsac is sent back to Paris. He realizes that the beast is actually an instrument of a secret society: The Brotherhood of the Wolf, which is working to undermine public confidence in the king and ultimately take over the country. Back in Gévaudan, the attacks by the real beast continue, and Fronsac returns to put an end to the beast's killings. At a secret rendezvous with Marianne, they are attacked by the beast, where it mysteriously refrains from attacking her.

Fronsac, Mani, and a young Marquis set out into the forest and set up an array of traps to capture the beast; it is severely injured but escapes. Mani sets off alone in pursuit, where he finds a catacomb used as the beast's holding pen, inhabited by the Brotherhood. Outnumbered, Mani is shot and killed. Fronsac discovers Mani's body and performs an autopsy, finding a silver bullet—Jean-François' signature choice of ammunition. In a fit of rage, a vengeful Fronsac goes to the catacombs and slaughters many members, but is overpowered by the local authorities and imprisoned.

Sylvia visits him in jail and reveals that she is a spy for the Holy See. She explains that Henri Sardis, the local priest and leader of the Brotherhood, believes that he is restoring worship of God to France. Pope Clement XIII has decided that Sardis is insane, and has sent her to eliminate him. She then poisons Fronsac, saying that he knows too much. Meanwhile, Jean-François comes to Marianne's room and reveals to her that he is the beast's master; it recognized his scent on her when it came near her, which is why it did not attack. He then rapes her when she rejects his advances.

Sylvia's agents exhume Fronsac and he appears at one of the Brotherhood's sermons. He kills several members, including Jean-François, who reveals that he had regained use of his supposedly mangled arm. Sardis escapes into the mountains, but is mauled to death by a pack of wolves. Fronsac and the Marquis go to the beast's lair, where it lies severely wounded. It turns out that the beast was a lion that Jean-François brought back from Africa as a cub that was tortured into becoming vicious and trained to wear spiked metal armor. Fronsac takes pity and kills the beast in an act of mercy.

Marquis d'Apcher finishes writing his account just before he is led to his execution by a revolutionary mob. He states that he doesn't know what happened to Fronsac and Marianne after the death of the beast; but he hopes that somewhere, they are happy together. A final scene shows Fronsac and Marianne sailing on a ship named Frère Loup—Brother Wolf.

== Cast ==
- Samuel Le Bihan as Knight Grégoire de Fronsac
- Vincent Cassel as Jean-François de Morangias
- Émilie Dequenne as Marianne de Morangias
- Monica Bellucci as Sylvia
- Jérémie Renier as Marquis Thomas d'Apcher
  - Jacques Perrin as older Thomas d'Apcher / Narrator
- Mark Dacascos as Mani
- Jean Yanne as Count de Morangias
- Jean-François Stévenin as Father Henri Sardis
- Édith Scob as Countess Geneviève de Morangias
- Johan Leysen as Antoine de Beauterne
- Bernard Farcy as Intendant Pièrre-Jean Laffont
- Hans Meyer as Marquis d'Apcher
- Philippe Nahon as Jean Chastel
- Gaspard Ulliel as Louis
- Nicolas Vaude as Maxime des Forêts
- Virginie Darmon as La Bavarde
- Eric Prat as Captain Duhamel
- Jean-Loup Wolff as Duke Gontrand de Moncan

== Production ==
Among other locations, the film was shot in Lectoure, located in the Gers department, and in Hautes-Pyrénées.

== Reception ==
=== Critical reception ===
Brotherhood of the Wolf garnered mostly positive reviews, with a 74% rating on Rotten Tomatoes, based on 126 reviews with the consensus stating: "Brotherhood of the Wolf mixes its genres with little logic, but the end result is wildly entertaining." whereas on Metacritic it accumulated a score of 57. The usage of various cinematographic techniques employed by Christophe Gans, the fight sequences, the atmosphere and particularly the performance of Mark Dacascos as the Native American Mani attracted particularly strong praise.

Roger Ebert of the Chicago Sun-Times awarded it 3 stars out of possible 4, describing the film as resembling "an explosion at the genre factory" with varied stylistic elements that sometimes did not work well together. More positivity, he praised the visuals and added: "I would be lying if I did not admit that this is all, in its absurd and overheated way, entertaining." James Berardinelli of ReelViews also rated the movie three stars out of four, saying that it "has something in it to appeal to just about everyone" and that it is "daring in its approach and successful in its result – assuming the result is to provide pure entertainment to the viewer." Michael Atkinson of Village Voice wrote "It's easily the most disarming and inventive movie made for genre geeks in years." Harry Knowles of Ain't It Cool News wrote that this film is "exciting, alluring and thrilling", whereas Empire gave the film a three-star rating out of five stating that "An undeniably handsome creation, but its excessive length and surplus of directorial flourishes merely exacerbate the emptiness of an initially promising plot". Lisa Nesselson from Variety gave a positive review mentioning that "a little Sergio Leone here, a little Sleepy Hollow there and, uh, martial arts-style confrontations are all deftly melded in Brotherhood of the Wolf, an attempt to elucidate the French urban legend of the Beast of Gevaudan. This is a home-grown French actioner that wears its sincere desire to entertain on its flamboyantly tailored sleeve".

The blend of various movie genres, such as martial arts, mystery, costume drama and horror attracted certain amounts of criticism. In particular, Peter Travers of Rolling Stone wrote "This new take on horror is more of the bloody same", whereas Stephen Hunter of The Washington Post said that it is "a mad agglomeration of styles and traditions that ultimately results in nothing so much as a mad agglomeration of styles and traditions".

Joan Dupont of The New York Times labelled Brotherhood of the Wolf as a "cult" film.

=== Box office ===
The film was one of the biggest box office hits for 2001 in France, grossing an estimated $24 million. The film also enjoyed commercial success in the United States; Universal Pictures paid $2 million to acquire the film's North American distribution rights and went on to gross $11.3 million in limited theatrical release, making it the sixth-highest-grossing French-language film of all time in the United States (behind Amelie, La Cage aux Folles, Z, A Man and a Woman and Emmanuelle). The film also did brisk video and DVD sales in the United States. Gans said that the film's United States release was a great success. On the other hand, the film was also number one at the Italian box office for two weeks. Overall, the film grossed $70 million in worldwide box office against $29 million production budget.

== Alternate versions ==
There are three distinct and very different versions of the film:

- The original French/US theatrical cut, running 143 minutes (sometimes listed as 142 minutes).
- The UK cut, running 139 minutes, released on home video in the UK and Australia; in this version, all the scenes involving the Royal Hunter Beauterne are removed and some scenes from "Director's Cut" are added in.
- The "Director's Cut", running 150 minutes (sometimes listed as 152 minutes), released on home video in France and Canada in 2002, and later in the US and other territories.

In the United States, Universal Pictures originally released the 143 minute theatrical cut on DVD & VHS, on 1 October 2002. Focus Features released a two-disc, special-edition DVD containing the "Director's Cut" on 26 August 2008. Shout! Factory released the "Brotherhood of the Wolf [Collector's Edition]" 4K & Blu-ray version with a runtime of 151 minutes on 23 May 2023.

== Awards ==
Won

- 2001 Cabourg Romantic Film Festival: Best New Actress (Émilie Dequenne)
- 2001 Sitges Film Festival: Grand Prize of European Fantasy Film in Silver (Christophe Gans)
- 2002 César Awards: Best Costume Design (Dominique Borg)
- 2003 Home Entertainment Awards (held by Video Software Dealers Association): Foreign Language Title of the Year (Universal Studios Home Entertainment)

Nominations

- 2001 European Film Awards: Best Director (Audience Award)-(Christophe Gans)
- 2002 International Horror Guild Award: Best Horror Film
- 2002 César Awards: Best Music Written for a Film (Joseph LoDuca), Best Production Design (Guy-Claude François), Best Sound (Cyril Holtz and Jean-Paul Mugel).
- 2002 Saturn Award: Best Action/Adventure/Thriller Film, Best Costume (Dominique Borg), Best Director (Christophe Gans), Best Music (Joseph LoDuca), Best Special Effects (Arthur Windus, Val Wardlaw, Hal Bertram, Nick Drew and Seb Caudron), Best Supporting Actor (Mark Dacascos), Best Supporting Actress (Monica Bellucci), Best Writing (Stéphane Cabel and Christophe Gans).
