= List of 2001 box office number-one films in Italy =

This is a list of films which have placed number one at the box office in Italy during 2001. Amounts are in lire.

== Number-one Films ==
†	This implies the highest-grossing movie of the year.

#	Week ending	Film	Box office	Notes	Ref
1	4 January 2001	Ask Me If I'm Happy	₤11,480,506,000		
2	11 January 2001	Ask Me If I'm Happy	₤7,606,632,000		
3	18 January 2001	Cast Away	₤7,491,876,000		
4	25 January 2001	Cast Away	₤7,536,974,000		
5	1 February 2001	Cast Away	₤5,864,410,000		
6	8 February 2001	Meet the Parents	₤6,855,472,000		
7	15 February 2001	Hannibal	₤11,290,480,000	Hannibal set an opening weekend record for a US release beating The Blair Witch Project with a gross of $4.6 million	
8	22 February 2001	Hannibal	₤6,943,758,000		
9	1 March 2001	What Women Want	₤4,300,292,000	What Women Want reached number one in its third week of release	
10	8 March 2001	What Women Want	₤2,855,658,000		
11	15 March 2001	Traffic	₤2,894,916,000		
12	22 March 2001	Traffic	₤2,278,106,000		
13	29 March 2001	Finding Forrester	₤1,851,430,000		
14	5 April 2001	Finding Forrester	₤1,633,774,000		
15	8 April 2001	The Emperor's New Groove	₤1,792,630,000		
16	19 April 2001	The Emperor's New Groove	₤3,444,886,000		
17	26 April 2001	The Mexican	₤6,091,914,000		
18	3 May 2001	The Mexican	₤2,332,416,000		
19	10 May 2001	The Mexican	₤1,216,960,000		
20	16 May 2001	The Mummy Returns	₤6,015,386,000	The Mummy Returns set a May opening record	
21	24 May 2001	The Mummy Returns	₤3,563,768,000		
22	31 May 2001	The Mummy Returns	₤1,542,300,000		
23	6 June 2001	Pearl Harbor	₤6,387,734,000		
24	14 June 2001	Pearl Harbor	₤4,275,578,000		
25	21 June 2001	Shrek	₤3,658,000,000		
26	28 June 2001	Shrek	₤2,268,000,000		
27	5 July 2001	Shrek	₤1,587,914,000		
28	12 July 2001	Evolution	₤1,343,242,000		
29	19 July 2001	Evolution	₤925,622,000		
30	26 July 2001	Evolution	₤551,218,000		
31	2 August 2001	Shrek	₤430,562,000	Shrek returned to number one in its seventh week of release	
32	9 August 2001	Shrek	TBD		
33	16 August 2001	Shrek	TBD		
34	23 August 2001	Shrek	TBD		
35	30 August 2001	Final Fantasy: The Spirits Within	₤2,717,740,000		
36	6 September 2001	Jurassic Park III	₤5,500,000,000		
37	13 September 2001	Save the Last Dance	₤3,935,506,000		
38	20 September 2001	Planet of the Apes	₤5,185,138,000		
39	27 September 2001	The Others	₤3,378,672,000	The Others reached number one in its second week of release	
40	4 October 2001	Swordfish	₤2,669,917,000	The Crow reached number one in its second week of release	
41	11 October 2001	A.I. Artificial Intelligence	₤3,112,664,000		
42	18 October 2001	Scary Movie 2	₤4,484,184,000		
43	25 October 2001	Bridget Jones's Diary	₤6,543,134,000		
44	1 November 2001	Bridget Jones's Diary	₤7,128,178,000		
45	8 November 2001	Bridget Jones's Diary	₤4,003,740,000		
46	15 November 2001	Bridget Jones's Diary	₤3,212,786,000		
47	18 November 2001	Bridget Jones's Diary	₤1,611,234,000		
48	29 November 2001	Brotherhood of the Wolf	₤4,349,980,000		
49	6 December 2001	Brotherhood of the Wolf	₤3,084,060,000		
50	13 December 2001	Harry Potter and the Philosopher's Stone †	₤13,312,000,000	Harry Potter and the Philosopher's Stone beat the opening record set by Fireworks	
51	20 December 2001	Harry Potter and the Philosopher's Stone †	₤8,394,474,000		
52	27 December 2001	Merry Christmas	₤11,726,498,000		

== See also ==
- Lists of box office number-one films
