= La Bête du Gévaudan (video game) =

1985 video game

- Developer: Compagnie Informatique Ludique
- Publisher: Compagnie Informatique Ludique
- Platform: Apple II
- Release: 1985
- Genre: Adventure
- Mode: Single-player

La Bête du Gévaudan is a 1985 text-and-graphics adventure video game developed and published by Compagnie Informatique Ludique for the Apple II.

== Gameplay ==
La Bête du Gévaudan is a text-and-graphics adventure video game in which the player controls a villager who must find the four ingredients needed to concoct a cure before he transforms back into the Beast of Gévaudan. A 12-hour countdown is constantly displayed on screen; when it reaches zero, the game ends. The player can navigate around the village with the N, E, S, and O keys and can perform actions by entering a verb-noun combination. The game allows the player to save progress at any time.

== Plot ==
The game is set in a small village of France in 1765. The villagers are afraid to go outside after dark, as a beast has begun prowling at night, killing both people and livestock. Soldiers try to kill the beast but repeatedly fail. One night, they manage to injure it. The following morning, the main protagonist wakes up with a gunshot wound on his arm. After his neighbours inform him of the events of the previous night, he realises that he is the Beast of Gévaudan and sets out to find a cure. The village alchemist explains to him that four ingredients are required to create the antidote.

== Reception ==
Tilt praised the game's visuals and described La Bête du Gévaudan as "a very good adventure game in French". The French magazine Casus Belli : Le magazine des jeux de simulation also commended the visual aspect of the game, although they considered the animations to be "a failure". The magazine highlighted the sense of freedom given to the player, noting that the village can be explored freely. The French magazine Jeux & stratégie described the game as "one of the best adventure games we have seen recently on Apple computers". The magazine found the game challenging but not overly frustrating, stating that the player is "never stuck for too long", and also praised the quality of the graphics.
