= George Glas =

George Glas (1725 – 30 November 1765) was a Scottish seaman and merchant adventurer in West Africa.

The son of John Glas, the divine, Glas was born at Dundee in 1725, and is said to have been brought up as a surgeon. He obtained command of a ship which traded between Brazil, the northwest coasts of Africa and the Canary Islands.

During his voyages he discovered on the Western Sahara seaboard a river navigable for some distance inland, and here he proposed to found a trading station. The exact spot is not known with certainty, but it is plausibly identified with Gueder, possibly the haven where the Spaniards had in the 15th and 16th centuries a fort called Santa Cruz de Mar Pequeña.

Glas made an arrangement with the Lords of Trade whereby he was granted £15,000 if he obtained free cession of the port he had discovered to the British crown; the proposal was to be laid before Parliament in the session of 1765. Having chartered a vessel, Glas, with his wife and daughter, sailed for Africa in 1764, reached his destination and made a treaty with the Moors of the district. He named his settlement Port Hillsborough, after Wills Hill, earl of Hillsborough (afterwards marquis of Downshire), president of the Board of Trade and Plantations (1763–1765). In November 1764, Glas and some companions, leaving his ship behind, went in the longboat to Lanzarote, intending to buy a small barque suitable for the navigation of the river on which was his settlement. From Lanzarote he forwarded to London the treaty he had concluded for the acquisition of Port Hillsborough. A few days later he was seized by the Spaniards, taken to Tenerife and imprisoned at Santa Cruz de Tenerife. In a letter to the Lords of Trade from Teneriffe, dated 15 December 1764, Glas said he believed the reason for his detention was the jealousy of the Spaniards at the settlement at Port Hillsborough because in a time of war the English might ruin their fishery and effectually stop the whole commerce of the Canary Islands.

The Spaniards further looked upon the settlement as a step towards the conquest of the islands. They therefore contrived how to make out a claim to the port and forged old manuscripts to prove their assertion (Calendar of Home Office Papers, 1760-1765). In March 1765 the ships company at Port Hillsborough was attacked by the natives and several members of it killed. The survivors, including Mrs and Miss Glas, escaped to Tenerife. In October following, through the representations of the British government, Glas was released from prison. With his wife and child he set sail for England on board the barque Earl of Sandwich. On 30 November British mariners George Gidley, Richard St. Quinton, Peter McKinlie and a Dutchman Andres Lukerman, who had learned that the ship contained much treasure, mutinied, killing the captain and passengers. Glas was stabbed to death, and his wife and daughter thrown overboard. The murderers were afterwards captured and hanged at Dublin. There is some evidence to suggest that Robert Louis Stevenson based his novel Treasure Island in part on the murders of the Glas family. He grew up in the shadow of the Glasite church in Edinburgh. After the death of Glas the British Government appears to have taken no steps to carry out his project.

In 1764, Glas published in London The History of the Discovery and Conquest of the Canary Islands, which he had translated from the manuscript of an Andalusian monk named Juan de Abréu Galindo, then recently discovered at La Palma. To this Glas added a description of the islands, a continuation of the history and an account of the manners, customs, trade, etc., of the inhabitants, displaying considerable knowledge of the archipelago.
