= François Antoine =

French gentilhomme

François Antoine, Officer of the Royal Bedchamber, Knight Equerry of the Royal Military Order of Saint Louis, served as Gun-Bearer to the King and Lieutenant of the Hunt under Louis XV, and is most notable as having pursued and slain what was thought to be the Beast of Gévaudan, its mate, and its whelps between 23 June and 17 October 1765.

Antoine, by personal decree of the King, arrived in Malzieu on 23 June 1765 to replace the ineffective Norman father-son duo of Jean-Charles-Marc-Antoine Vaumesle d'Enneval and Jean-François, who had been at the hunt since March with little to show for their efforts but the skins of ordinary wolves. His hunting party consisted of eight gamekeepers from the Royal Captaincies of the Hunt, two mounted gamekeepers on loan from the Duke of Orléans, three aides of the Duke of Penthiévre, a servant of the Prince de Condé, two doghandlers, a valet, and Antoine's own son, de Beauterne, of the National Gendarmerie. With him Antoine brought four male wolfhounds and a female greyhound, all hand-picked from the Royal Pack. He intended to supplement this small group with hounds from d'Enneval's own pack, as the Norman had yet to receive the recall of the King, and experienced dogs from local packs that had fought with the Beast.

Antoine first hunted with the d'Ennevals on 23 June, a Sunday, in the Malzieu area. Though the majority of the Gévaudanais were Catholic, thereby restricting them from strenuous activity on the Sabbath, Sunday hunts allowed the citizenry to depart from churches en-masse and move to the positions to which they had been assigned by local government officials, often as beaters.

== Background ==
The d'Ennevals themselves had on 17 February replaced capitaine-aide-major Duhamel and his fifty-seven dragoons as masters of the hunt in Gévaudan, but they were proving to be equally unsuccessful in the field. On 8 April Duhamel relocated to new quarters at Pont-Saint-Esprit with his mixed regiment, the Volunteers of Clermont, having been removed and reassigned by Clément Charles François de Laverdy, whose faith in the Duhamel placed him outside of the King's favour. Despite enjoying the reputation of a great wolf hunter in Normandy, d'Enneval having destroyed 1200 wolves during his career, the Beast remained at large. Moreover, his surly demeanor towards the Gévaudanais and local government officials, including the Bishop of Mende, did not place him in a favorable position, no matter how much favour he had at the court of the King, where he was vouched for by the intendant of his province M. Lallemant de Levignen.

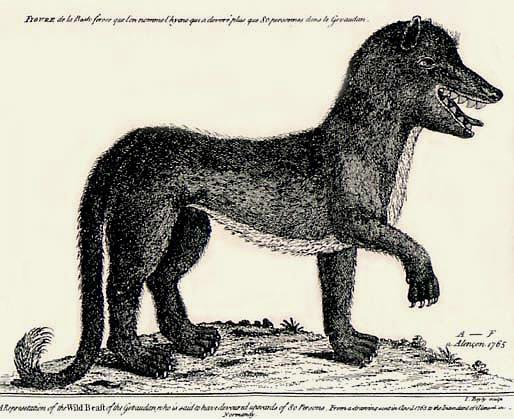
Artist's conception of the Beast of Gévaudan, 18th-century engraving by A.F. of Alençon

Public confidence in the d'Ennevals collapsed on 24 May during the popular fair at Malzieu. The Beast made its first attack of the day at Julianges, critically wounding twenty-year-old Marguerite Martin, who received extreme unction by the roadside from the vicar of Saint-Privat. A mile from this episode, in Amourettes, a boy of eleven was seized, but the Beast was put to flight by neighbors coming to his aid. It then fell upon a boy and girl as they entered a copse, devouring thirteen-year-old Marie Valét even as her companion attempted to fight off the assailant. When the boy brought help from local villagers, they found only a headless corpse from which most of the flesh had been eaten. A huntsman of d'Enneval was sent to set an ambush at the corpse of Valét, but the Beast did not return. Instead, it arrived in Lorciéres and attacked Marguerite Boney, eighteen, by the village of Marcillac, emerging from its hiding place in a juniper thicket and rending her clothes until she was naked from the waist up. To her aid came sixteen-year-old Pierre Tanavelle, whose aunt had been slain by the Beast on 23 February. Wielding an improvised spear he wounded the Beast, and it fled. News of these depredations reached the marketplace at Malzieu even as the Beast went about its business, prompting many to pack up their wares and head home.

Louis XV, upon hearing of the events of 24 May, became furious and informed his court that he intended to replace the d'Ennevals, who had fared no better than Duhamel before them, with Antoine. The Royal Gunbearer departed for the Gévaudan on 8 June. Antoine and the d'Ennevals cooperated in the field until 18 July, when de Laverdy assented to the orders of Étienne Lafont, syndic of the estates of the Gévaudan and subdelegate to the intendant of Languedoc, to remove the Normans and give Antoine complete control of the hunt. D'Enneval and son soon returned to Normandy after they were mocked for their futile efforts at the court of the King. A contemporary was noted as saying the d'Ennevals bore "shame tantamount to that of a fox who has been caught by a chicken."

== July through September ==
Antoine had been busy in the field long before the d'Ennevals packed for Normandy. On 6 July he and his party arrived in Broussolles, where a cowherd had been slain by the Beast two days before. Antoine discovered two sets of tracks at the site of the latest attack, that of a large male wolf and a she-wolf, which he suspected to be the Beast's mate. If the Beast had in fact reproduced, Antoine surmised, the she-wolf and whelps would have to be destroyed as well. His first formal hunt occurred on 11 July, but yielded nothing, and activity among the huntsmen was sporadic for the remainder of the month due to heavy rains, with large-scale hunts on 24 and 28 July. The Beast, however, continued to assail the Gévaudanais irrespective of the weather.

Several local government officials were soon the recipients of a communique from Antoine titled Observations, including Louis Phélypeaux, Count de Saint-Florentin and Ministre d'État; M. Marie-Joseph-Emmanuel de Guignard de Saint-Priest, intendant of the Languedoc; and Jean-Bapstiste de Morin, Count de Moncan, the provincial commander who had originally assigned Duhamel to the hunt. His correspondence highlighted the extreme severity of the terrain in the Gévaudan, which Antoine found more difficult than that of any region he had hunted in the last fifty years, including all of France, and locales in Germany, Piedmont, and the Pyrenees. He also requested a dozen sergeants to organize the peasants who served as beaters during the large hunts, and pleaded for a detachment of hounds and coursers to replace the dogs of his own pack, which were faring none too well. The Duke of Penthiévre, who had already donated three of his personal huntsmen to Antoine's cause, was among the nobility to which Antoine sent his requests.

On 11 August, Marie-Jeanne Valet and her younger sister were attacked while fording a tributary of the River Desges, on the road from Paulhac-en-Margeride to Broussous. Valet successfully defended herself and her sister with a bayonet mounted at the end of a staff, wounding the Beast, which threw itself into the river and thrashed about madly before escaping. Antoine and company quickly made their way to Paulhac when they heard of this event, praising Marie-Jeanne for her bravery. The Royal Gunbearer compared her favourably to Joan of Arc, calling her the "Maid of the Gévaudan." Unconvinced that the Beast had been wounded to the death, however, he remained in the field. Writing to M. Saint-Priest, Antoine respectfully requested if a monetary reward for Marie-Jeanne Valet would be forthcoming. "By the way", he added, "I have sent to the royal kennels for help, just in case the Beast is not dead. While awaiting the arrival of this help, we shall gather all our strength and our wits to finish thereby the tragedy whose sad enactment has gone on too long."

Antoine was in Besseyre on 19 August for a special mass said in honour of the Holy Ghost, attended by many members of the surrounding parishes and presided over by such notables as the prior of Prévac, the prior-vicar of Nozeyrolles, and the vicars of Paulhac, Sauges, and Venteuges. A procession of Antoine's huntsmen in full dress lead to the nearby castle at Besset, where a feast was held, followed by a celebration in honour of Saint Louis, accompanied by fireworks, fusillades, and the music of hunting horns. The men were in good spirits after the festivities, some believing that Marie-Jean Valet's bayonet thrust on 11 August had done the Beast in. Their spirits fell when a woman of twenty-two was attacked near the village of Diége on 2 September. Attacks increased in frequency through the first weeks of the month, on 8, 11, 12, and 13 September, resulting in four injuries and two deaths, and Antoine was at the verge of surrender. "Had I the wit of a Voltaire", wrote Antoine to Saint-Priest and Lafont, tantamount to a resignation with the onset of winter, "I could pen a moving farewell." On 16 September, as he was composing his official withdrawal from the hunt, he was surprised by the arrival of two doghandlers and a dozen hounds, the progeny of the requests he had submitted at the end of July. Heartened, Antoine abandoned his surrender and again took to the field.

== Loup de Chazes ==
On 19 September, a huntsman informed Antoine that a large wolf had been sighted in Saint-Julien-des-Chazes, and that a she-wolf and her whelps were nearby. Antoine and his party quickly moved in, and on 21 September a doghandler gave the good news that the entire wolf pack had been located in the Pommier Woods, north of the abbey Sainte-Marie-des-Chazes. The forest was soon surrounded. Antoine's hunting party, bolstered by the addition of forty sharpshooters from Langeac and elsewhere, moved into the trees, houndsmen at the front. Antoine himself had set up at the exit to a defile known as the Béal Ravine, and it was there that he encountered the wolf as it emerged from the forest. His musket loaded with no less than five charges of powder, a ball, and thirty to forty pieces of shrapnel known as "wolf shot", he fired at a range of fifty yards, the kick of his weapon knocking him nearly to the ground. The wolf collapsed, having taken the ball to his right eye and the shot to his right shoulder and side. As Antoine raised the call of triumph to his fellow huntsmen, the wolf struggled to its feet and made straight for him, only to be put to flight by a shot from Rinchard, cousin to Antoine and one of the mounted gamekeepers supplied by the Duke of Orléans. The wolf, struck by Rinchard's shot, made a dash of twenty-five yards before at last dropping dead.

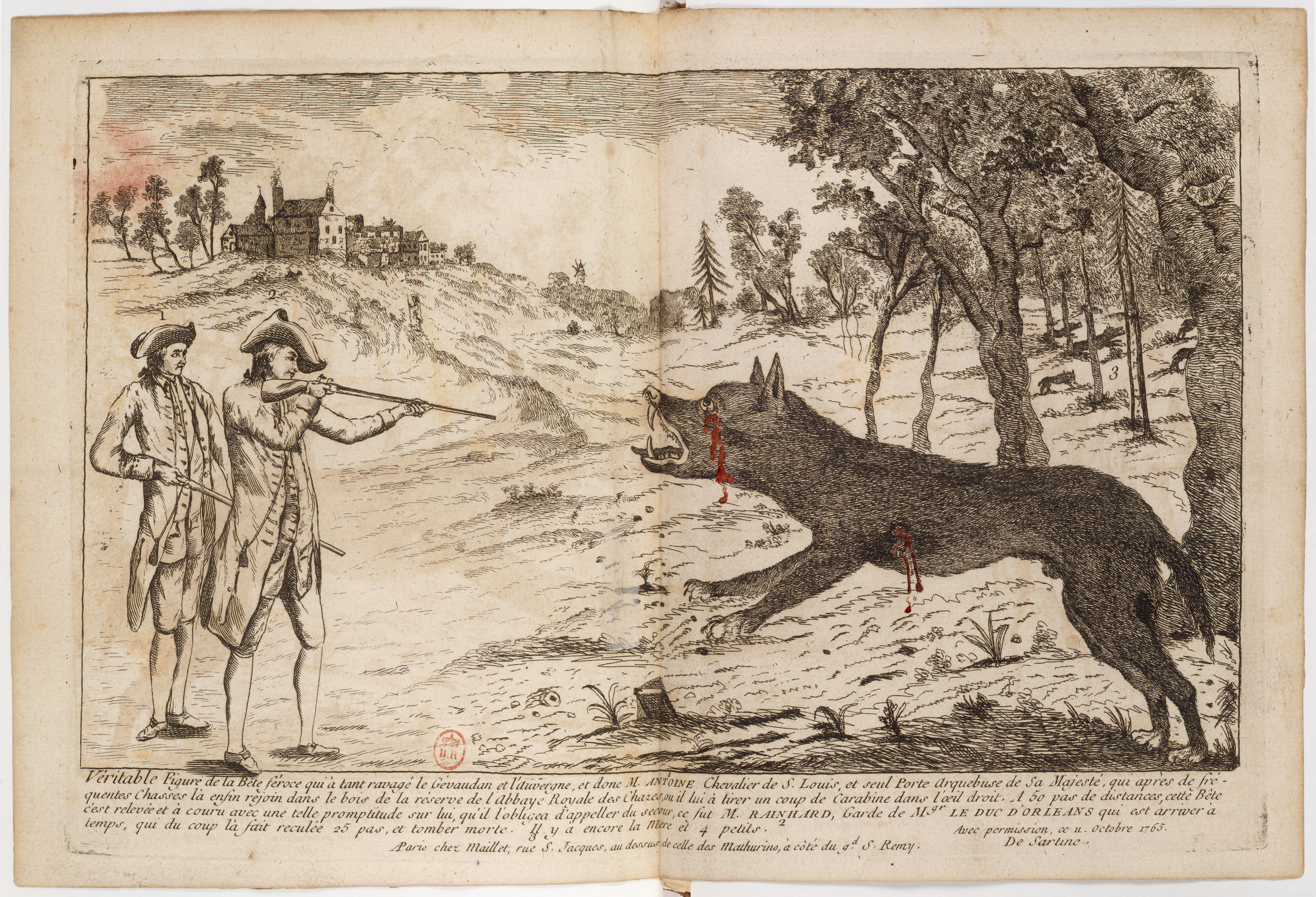
Antoine killing the Wolf of Chazes, 18th-century engraving

Le Loup de Chazes, as it was afterward known, was six feet long, slightly over three feet tall, and weighed a hundred and forty pounds. Antoine was anxious to confirm without doubt that the dead animal before him was the Beast, so it was soon taken to Besset where a necropsy was performed by the surgeon Boulanger. Though no human remains were uncovered in its stomach or intestines, a number of individuals who had been attacked by the Beast came forward and identified Antoine's wolf as their assailant, including Marie-Jeanne Valet, whom Antoine had called the "Maid of the Gévaudan." His hopes confirmed, Antoine arranged for the embalming of the animal, whose carcass was to be presented before Louis XV himself.

The death of the Wolf of Chazes notwithstanding, Antoine was unable to locate the rest of the wolf pack. The she-wolf and her whelps remained unaccounted for until October. It was said at the time that Antoine, having left his post at the Pommier Woods when his father Antoine let out his cry of victory, allowed the escape of the she-wolf and whelps, he having been positioned at the edge of forest where they made their escape.

== She-wolf and whelps ==
Antoine, fearing that the hunger and ferocity of the Beast may have passed into its offspring, also resolved to destroy the she-wolf and its whelps, ignoring premature celebration over the events of 21 September. From 22 September to 3 October Antoine and his party continued the hunt to no avail. On 4 October, however, Antoine returned to the abbey of Sainte-Marie-des-Chazes, where his huntsmen wounded one of two wolves traveling together. Due to the evidence at hand, Antoine believed that the wounded wolf was one of the cubs and, moreover, had suffered a mortal injury.

On 5 October Antoine again hunted in the Forest of Chazes and his marksmen shot and wounded the she-wolf, which escaped. His renewed activities had kept the Beast's mate and its progeny at bay; during this week they had killed nothing but sheep. On 13 October Antoine returned to Chazes at the behest of Madame de Guerin de Lugeac, prioress of Sainte-Marie-des-Chazes, who reported the presence of two wolves in her timber preserves. After a pursuit of nearly an hour and a half, Regnault, one of the eight gamekeepers from the Royal Captaincies of the Hunt, wounded the she-wolf, and she was finished off by two sharpshooters from Langeac twenty yards from where Antoine had fired on the Wolf of Chazes, the Beast, on 21 September. The she-wolf was twenty-six inches at the shoulder and showed signs of having recently nursed whelps. Antoine, who believed the first whelp to have fallen on 4 October, surmised that but one wolf remained.

17 October brought the death of the last wolf, shot fittingly by Antoine himself. The carcasses of the wolf and its mother were poorly preserved, unlike that of the Beast, and prepared for shipment to Versailles. The reward for the slaying of the Beast, by now hovering at ten-thousand livres, Antoine distributed among his huntsmen while only taking a small fraction for himself. After more than four months in the field Antoine departed the Gévaudan for Versailles on 3 November, reaching the court of the King where he received copious praise for his victory, the Cross of the Order of Saint Louis, a pension of a thousand livres, and the right to add the image of the Beast to his coat of arms.

Attacks ceased for a time after the destruction of the Loup de Chazes, the she-wolf, and her whelps, but began anew on 3 December 1765, and continued until 19 June 1767. It was Gévaudan rustic Jean Chastel who ended the scourge of the wolves once and for all, mortally wounding the new Beast at Mountmouchet during a hunt organized by M. le Marquis d'Apcher. It was guessed by many at the time that the whelp Antoine had believed to be wounded to the death on 4 October was the animal killed by Chastel, which had retreated into the Margeride Range for two months, recuperating and growing in size and returning to continue the depredations of its sire.

== See also ==
- Wolf of Soissons
- List of fatal wolf attacks
- Wolfcatcher Royal, who curiously was not assigned to this task
- Wolf hunting
