= Charraix =

- Commune
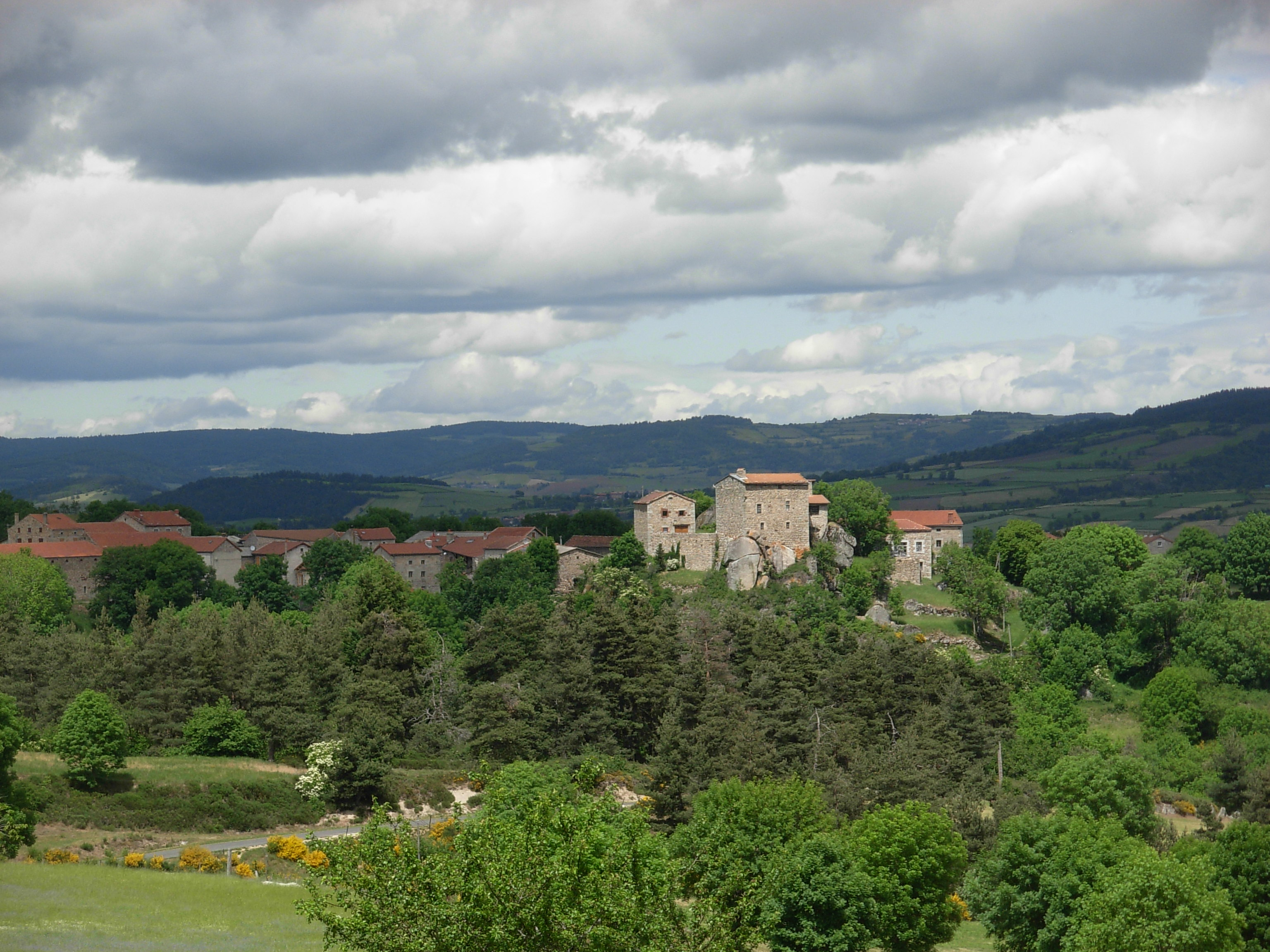
- Location of Charraix
- Location within France Location within Auvergne-Rhône-Alpes
- Coordinates: 45°01′37″N 3°34′10″E
- Country: France
- Region: Auvergne-Rhône-Alpes
- Department: Haute-Loire
- Arrondissement: Brioude
- Canton: Gorges de l'Allier-Gévaudan

Government
  - Mayor (2020–2026): Roland Galtier
- Area^{1}: 9.46 km^{2} (3.65 sq mi)
- Elevation: 920 m (3,020 ft)
- Highest elevation: 1,030 m (3,380 ft)
- Lowest elevation: 720 m (2,360 ft)
- Population (2023): 67
  - Density: 7.1/km^{2} (18/sq mi)
- Time zone: UTC+01:00 (CET)
  - Summer (DST): UTC+02:00 (CEST)
- INSEE/Postal code: 43060 /43300
- ^{1} French Land Register data, which excludes lakes, ponds, glaciers > 1 km^{2} (0.386 sq mi or 247 acres) and river estuaries.

Charraix (French pronunciation: [ʃaʁɛ]) is a commune in the Haute-Loire department in south-central France.

== Population ==
Historical population
Year	Pop.	±% p.a.
1968	173	—
1975	152	−1.83%
1982	130	−2.21%
1990	111	−1.96%
1999	82	−3.31%
2007	96	+1.99%
2012	87	−1.95%
2017	71	−3.98%
2023	67	−0.96%
Source: INSEE

== See also ==
- Communes of the Haute-Loire department
