= La Besseyre-Saint-Mary =

- Commune
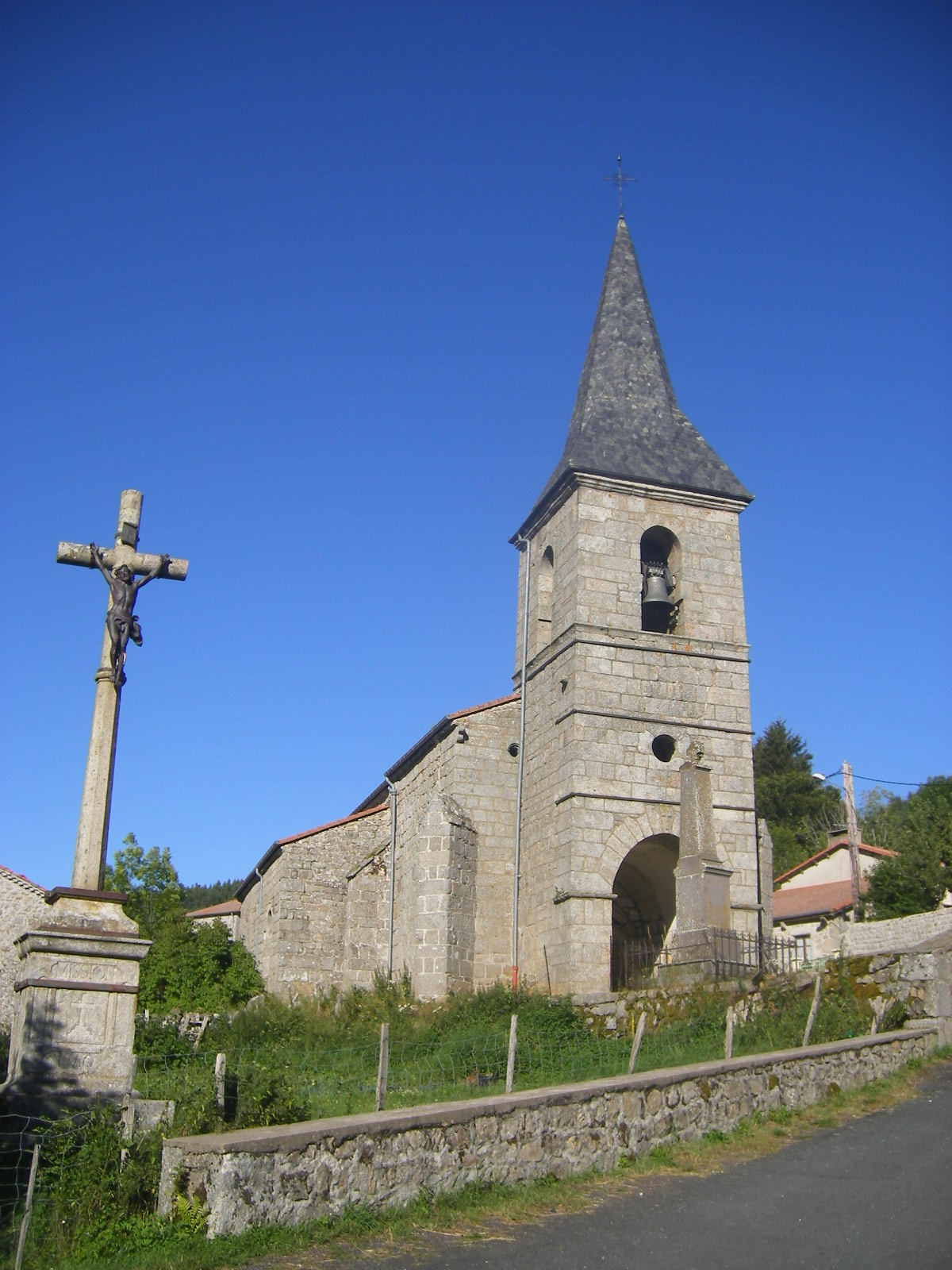
- Location of La Besseyre-Saint-Mary
- Location within France Location within Auvergne-Rhône-Alpes
- Coordinates: 44°58′15″N 3°25′06″E
- Country: France
- Region: Auvergne-Rhône-Alpes
- Department: Haute-Loire
- Arrondissement: Brioude
- Canton: Gorges de l'Allier-Gévaudan

Government
  - Mayor (2020–2026): Jean Pascal
- Area^{1}: 21.57 km^{2} (8.33 sq mi)
- Elevation: 1,030 m (3,380 ft)
- Highest elevation: 1,496 m (4,908 ft)
- Lowest elevation: 749 m (2,457 ft)
- Population (2023): 103
  - Density: 4.78/km^{2} (12.4/sq mi)
- Time zone: UTC+01:00 (CET)
  - Summer (DST): UTC+02:00 (CEST)
- INSEE/Postal code: 43029 /43170
- ^{1} French Land Register data, which excludes lakes, ponds, glaciers > 1 km^{2} (0.386 sq mi or 247 acres) and river estuaries.

La Besseyre-Saint-Mary (French pronunciation: [la besɛʁ sɛ̃ maʁi]; Occitan: La Becèira) is a commune in the Haute-Loire department in south-central France.

== Population ==
Historical population
Year	Pop.	±% p.a.
1968	302	—
1975	244	−3.00%
1982	204	−2.53%
1990	156	−3.30%
1999	131	−1.92%
2007	138	+0.65%
2012	127	−1.65%
2017	100	−4.67%
2023	103	+0.49%
Source: INSEE

== See also ==
- Communes of the Haute-Loire department
