= Paulhac-en-Margeride =

- Commune
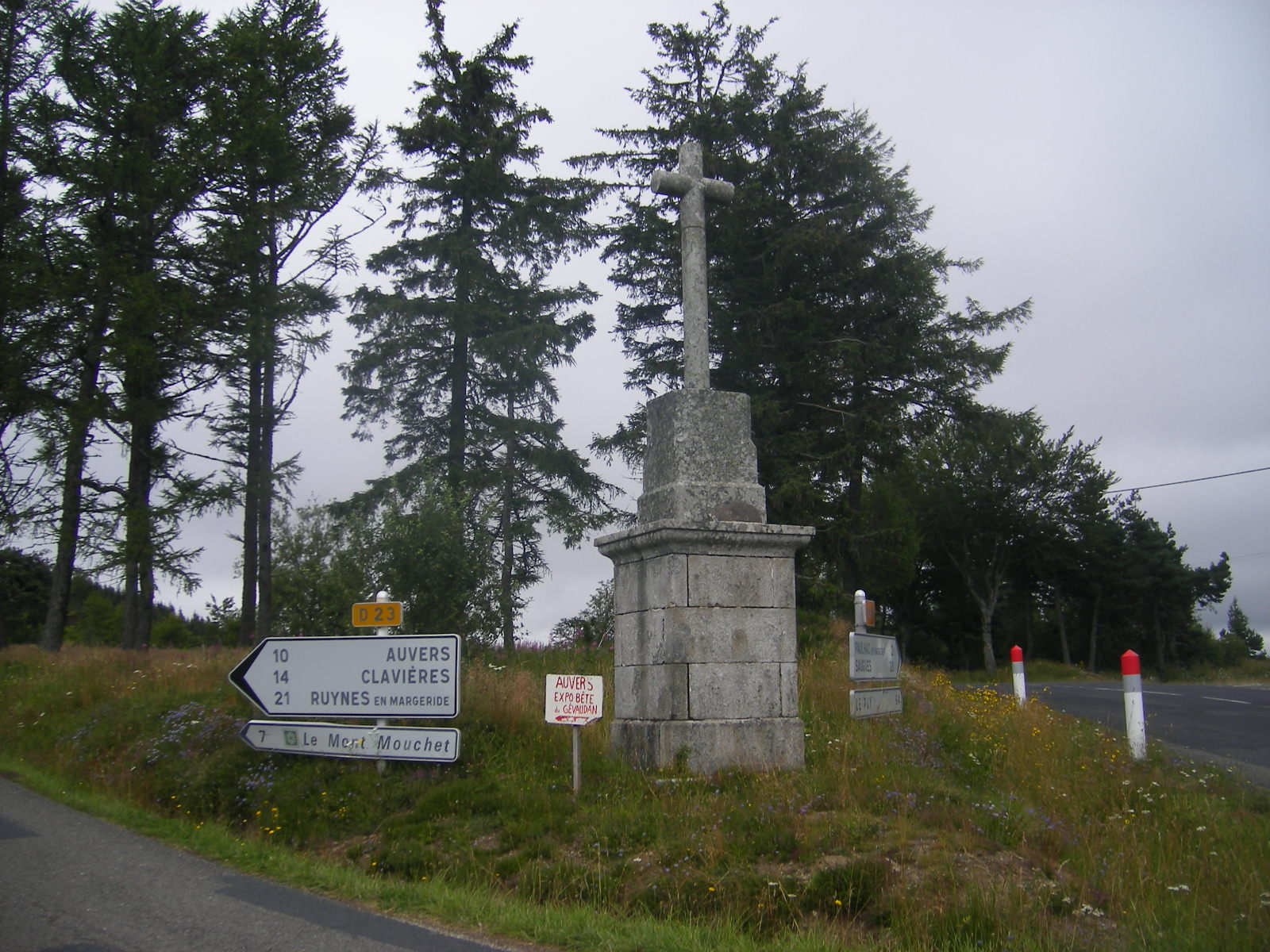
- The Croix de Fau, in Paulhac-en-Margeride

- Coat of arms
- Location of Paulhac-en-Margeride
- Location within France Location within Occitanie
- Coordinates: 44°56′52″N 3°22′53″E
- Country: France
- Region: Occitania
- Department: Lozère
- Arrondissement: Mende
- Canton: Saint-Alban-sur-Limagnole
- Intercommunality: Terres d'Apcher-Margeride-Aubrac

Government
  - Mayor (2020–2026): Alain Guennou
- Area^{1}: 15.79 km^{2} (6.10 sq mi)
- Elevation: 1,168 m (3,832 ft)
- Highest elevation: 1,496 m (4,908 ft)
- Lowest elevation: 1,056 m (3,465 ft)
- Population (2023): 87
  - Density: 5.5/km^{2} (14/sq mi)
- Time zone: UTC+01:00 (CET)
  - Summer (DST): UTC+02:00 (CEST)
- INSEE/Postal code: 48110 /48140
- ^{1} French Land Register data, which excludes lakes, ponds, glaciers > 1 km^{2} (0.386 sq mi or 247 acres) and river estuaries.

Paulhac-en-Margeride is a commune in the Lozère departement in southern France.

== See also ==
- Communes of the Lozère department
