= Courtaud =

15th-century wolf

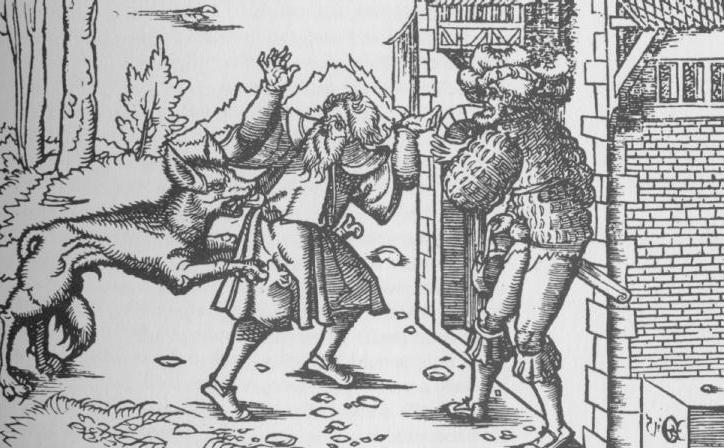
- A German engraving from 1516 depicting a wolf attack. Source: Johann Geiler von Kaisersberg, Die Emeis
- Other name: Courtaut
- Species: Wolf (Canis lupus)
- Died: near Paris, France
- Known for: Killing dozens of people in the 1430s
- Named after: Its missing tail

Courtaud (Old French: Courtaut, "short (or stumpy) tail") was a wolf blamed for numerous fatal attacks on humans near Paris in the 1430s, during a period of frequent wolf attacks in the region in the later years of the Hundred Years' War. It was captured near Paris in the autumn of 1439. Courtaud is described in contemporary chronicles, mainly in the anonymous Journal d'un bourgeois de Paris, as unusually dangerous, and it was named for its missing tail. Historians attribute the rise in wolf attacks during this period to war-related disruption and a severe famine in the late 1430s, which are thought to have brought wolves into closer contact with humans. In the 20th century, Ernest Thompson Seton retold and embellished Courtaud's story, and his version influenced later accounts.

== History ==
Wolf attacks on the population around Paris were recorded sporadically for two decades before Courtaud's capture, as attested in the anonymous Journal d'un bourgeois de Paris sous Charles VI et Charles VII, which describes various events of the first half of the 15th century. According to the Journal, during July 1421, "starving" wolves would come into inhabited areas surrounding Paris to feed upon bodies recently buried in the nearby fields and villages, and at night scavenging wolves would enter towns and occasionally Paris itself. Wolves entering Paris itself were not always deadly: in 1423, several were reportedly caught in the city most nights, and captured wolves were paraded through the streets hung by their hind legs, with onlookers giving money to see them.

In December 1438, wolves entered Paris via the river and killed a child at night near the Place aux Chats, behind the Cemetery of the Innocents. By 1439, the wolves surrounding Paris had become emboldened and began to devour human beings: men, women, and children, even preying on shepherds while leaving their flock unscathed. According to the journal's account, during the last week of September alone, 14 victims "large and small" were "strangled" and eaten by the wolves "between Montmartre and the Porte St. Antoine, both in the vineyards and within the swamps". Between 1436 and 1440, the wolves claimed between 60 and 80 human lives. Additional accounts of similar behavior in wolves appear in other chronicles which document the Hundred Years' War. Some describe the infiltration of starving wolves into major towns at night to "feast on the dead and dying", and the chronicles of Jean Chartier (1385–1464) state that there "were so many wolves in the areas around Paris that it was astonishing, some of them ate people".

Among the wolves blamed for the attacks, one gained particular notoriety: a "terrible and horrible wolf," according to the Journal. This particular wolf was missing its tail, and thus was given the nickname of Courtaud, meaning "short (or stumpy) tail". It was caught in autumn 1439, on the eve of Saint Martin's day (10 November), after being pursued at length. It was said to have been responsible for more deaths than all the other wolves combined. Courtaud's ferocity was of great public concern in Paris, and people going out to the field were warned, "Beware of Courtaud!" When the beast was finally caught, it was placed in a wheelbarrow with its jaws held open and taken through the city. The Journal concludes that people left everything they were doing in order to view Courtaud's carcass, and that the sight "was worth to them more than ten francs".

Attacks did not end with Courtaud's capture. In December 1439, wolves "strangled" four women near Paris, and several days later mauled seventeen more people around the city, eleven of whom died of their injuries. More than two decades later, with the accession of Louis XI to the French throne in 1461, widespread wolf-hunts were conducted, and over a period of six months in that year, 227 wolves were officially killed in the viscounty of Paris.

== Interpretation ==
The divergence of the Parisian wolves from their ordinary behavior of avoiding humans has been explained by some as the result of the Hundred Years War. The desolated villages, the abundance of corpses and the vulnerability and availability of the mortally wounded, women and children all are considered contributing factors to the development of the man-eating canids. This suggestion was adopted by authors Seton and Mannix. Historian John Knifton drew attention to the succession of extremely cold winters during the mid 15th century and a severe famine between 1437 and 1439, which may have influenced the wolves' behavior. Similarly, early modern sources point to a correlation between famines and the venturing of wolves into the area ruled by the House of Valois during 1437–1438 (translated from French):

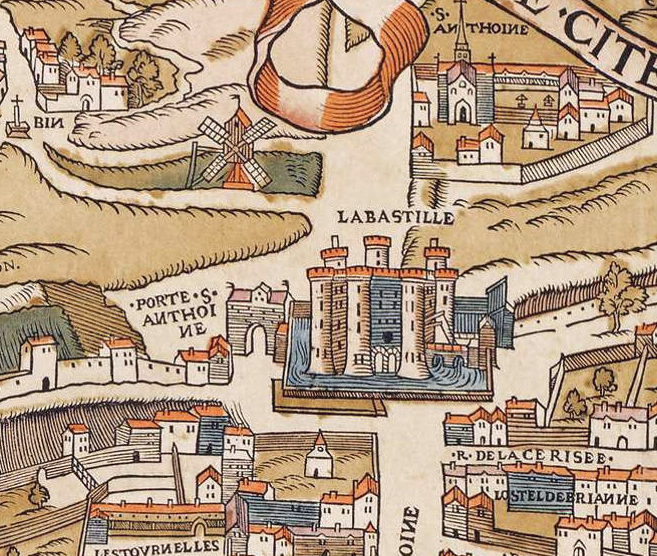
St-Antoine gate and La Bastille on the plan of Truschet and Hoyau (1550)

To this fury of mutual plundering and slaughter, and to the abandonment of agriculture, which caused a terrible famine in the country, were added continuous rains that carried away a large part of its resources. This new disaster caused widespread mortality. As an additional misfortune, there occurred an extraordinary scourge that has sometimes been observed following famines: packs of wolves suddenly emerged from the forests and roamed the countryside for several months.

—Claude Carlier (1764). Histoire du duché de Valois. Paris. p. 477.

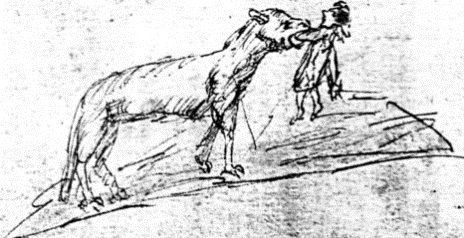
Loup anthropophage (1589). A man-eating wolf in Brittany, during the French Wars of Religion.

== Modern depictions ==
Author Ernest Thompson Seton provided a much expanded account of the events surrounding Courtaud in his 1937 work Mainly about Wolves, though he admitted that while all the main outlines of the story were historically correct, he had "embellished and expanded with the utmost freedom". Seton's adaptation, together with the account in the Journal, served as the sources for the reconstruction of Courtaud's story in The Wolves of Paris by Daniel P. Mannix. Authors Michael Wallace and Lance Roddick wrote novels with a name identical to that of Mannix, and used Courtaud's story as a setting.

== See also ==
- Beast of Gévaudan
- List of wolf attacks
- List of individual wolves
- Peluda, or the Shaggy Beast
- Wolf of Ansbach
- Wolf of Soissons
- Wolves in folklore, religion and mythology
