= Custer Wolf =

Notorious gray wolf in North America

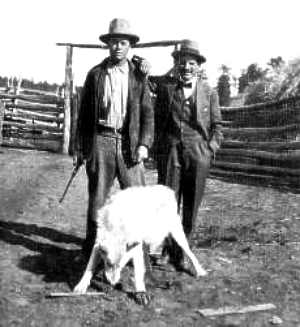
- Federal hunter H.P. Williams (pictured left) and local rancher stand over slain Custer Wolf on October 11, 1920
- Species: Canis lupus nubilus
- Died: 11 October, 1920
- Known for: Extensive damage to ranchers' livestock in the area surrounding Custer, South Dakota
- Named after: Custer, South Dakota

The Custer Wolf was a Great Plains wolf who was held responsible for extensive damage to ranchers' livestock in the area surrounding Custer, South Dakota, between 1911 and 1920, with the damage estimated at $25,000. The wolf was shot by a hunter employed by the federal government, who tracked the wolf for months and killed him after the wolf had triggered a trap.

== Legend of the Custer Wolf ==
Responsible for the death of $25,000 (equivalent to roughly $320,000 in 2020) worth of horses, cattle, and calves, the wolf eluded professional hunters, sportsmen, and bounty-hunters for nine years, during which time the bounty on his head increased from $100 to $500, ten times the usual price of a normal wolf at the time. Until H.P. Williams, an experienced hunter, killed the wolf, no hunts were successful; one tracked the wolf for five years before giving up. Local folklore added greatly to the mystery and hysteria surrounding the wolf. Locals claimed that he was not just a wolf but a "monstrosity of nature", a hybrid between a wolf and a mountain lion. The wolf had escaped death so many times that the ranchers of the area believed that they would have to endure their livestock losses until the wolf died of natural causes.

The wolf reportedly killed more than he needed to survive; in one week he killed more than 30 cattle, castrating and mutilating them. One newspaper even called the wolf "The cruelest, most sagacious, and most successful animal outlaw"; another author called him "the master criminal of the animal world". It was believed that four years prior to the beginning of his rampage, his mate and their pups were killed, and that the wolf never took another mate or joined another pack: popular belief of the townspeople of Custer held that the wolf was seeking vengeance against the humans that had killed his mate and pups.

== Federal involvement ==
In 1911, 55 gray wolves were killed in the South Dakota Black Hills, with bounties paid. In 1915, 8 more were killed; in 1916, 5 more. A pregnant wolf and her four pups were killed in 1917, and what was possibly her mate was killed in 1920. Without the buffalo and other game to prey on, wolves had to adapt to changing circumstances; they did so by attacking livestock. Many wolves were simply poisoned with strychnine; others were shot in a large federally funded eradication program, which between 1915 and 1920 employed over 300 hunters, who killed a staggering number of animals: 110,000 coyotes, 15,000 bobcats and lynxes, 3,000 wolves. Counting those killed by poison, the total exceeded 250,000.

To kill the Custer Wolf, the United States Department of Agriculture sent top federal hunter H.P. Williams, who was ordered to stay in South Dakota until the wolf was dead. Williams was credited with trapping and killing over a thousand wolves across the Western United States from the late 19th century to the mid-1920s.

== H.P. Williams's hunt ==
Williams arrived in April 1920. The wolf had been known to travel in an area of 300 square miles (780 km^{2}) in southern South Dakota, and had even been seen in parts of Wyoming and Nebraska. When Williams first saw the Custer Wolf he was unable to get a clear shot, but along the way, he realized that two coyotes had allied themselves with the wolf: though keeping a distance from the much larger wolf, the two coyotes would often eat the wolf's leftovers. Reportedly, the two coyotes would travel ahead at the flanks of the wolf and warn him of any danger ahead. Williams realized this and decided to kill both coyotes in hopes of being able to get a clear shot; the deaths of the coyotes did indeed spook the wolf.

After coming close on a number of occasions throughout the summer of 1920, Williams did not see the wolf for almost the entire month of August; in early September, a trap Williams had laid ripped some hair off the wolf's paw. He tracked the wolf again when livestock attacks resumed in early September. After eluding Williams for yet another month, the Custer Wolf stepped on a trap one mid-October morning. The wolf ran with it for about 150 yards (140 m) until getting caught on a tree, breaking the swivel of the trap. The severely injured wolf left an easy trail, and Williams shot him after trailing him for 3 miles (4.8 km), on October 11.

The Custer Wolf was shot seven months after Williams arrived in South Dakota. To the surprise of many residents of Custer, the animal they had thought a monstrosity of nature was just a normal North American gray wolf, 98 pounds (44 kg) heavy and just over 6 feet (1.8 m) in length. The wolf was so aged that his pelt had turned white. Williams noted that the wolf's teeth would have been strong enough to hunt for another 15 years. In an interview Williams gave 40 years after leaving South Dakota, he spoke of the great respect that he had for the wolf for giving him the most difficult hunt of his career. In total, the Custer Wolf was credited with killing more than 500 livestock and horses, worth around $25,000, or $400,000 in 2025 dollars.

== Legacy ==
In 1966, wildlife writer Roger A. Caras published a book called The Custer Wolf, which tells the story of a family of wolves in the Custer area through the eyes of one of the wolves. Beginning in a world of natural harmony, the wolves' lives and those of all other animals are disturbed when iron ore from Michigan and coal from Pennsylvania are turned into guns and traps; strychnine is imported from India, all to make war on the wolf. The book ends with H.P. Williams's reflection on the animals he killed.

== See also ==
- Surplus killing
- Three Toes of Harding County
- List of wolves
