= O-Six =

Female gray wolf and hunting victim

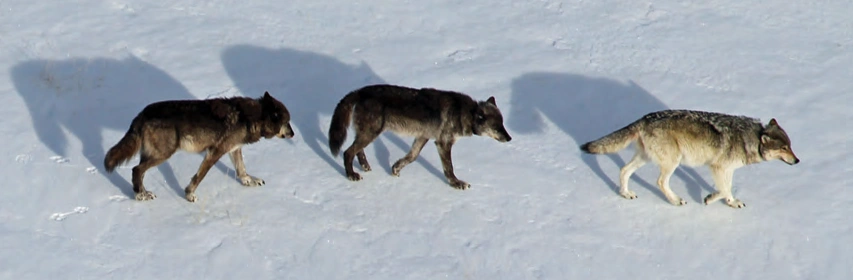
- The "O-Six" Female (right) pictured in March 2012 alongside her mate 755M (center) and his brother 754M (left)
- Other names: 832F; The 06 Female; She Wolf
- Species: Gray wolf (Canis lupus)
- Sex: Female
- Born: April 2006; Lamar River Valley, Yellowstone National Park
- Died: 6 December 2012 (6 years 8 months); Wyoming, Sunlight Unit
- Cause of death: Legal harvest via firearm
- Known for: Lead female of the Lamar Canyon Pack (2010 - 2012); Highly visible and photographed The impact her death had across the world
- Residence: Yellowstone National Park
- Parents: 472F (mother); 113M (father)
- Mate: 755M
- Offspring: 3 litters of pups (2010, 2011 and 2012); 926F (Spitfire) (in the 2011 litter)

O-Six (2006–2012), also known as 832F or "The 06 Female", was a female northwestern wolf, whose death by hunting just outside the protected area of Yellowstone National Park stirred debate about the hunting and protection of wolves in Wyoming, Montana and Idaho. The bestselling book American Wolf focused on O-Six's life and on conservation policies in the Yellowstone region.

== Life ==
O-Six (named after the year of her birth). was for several years [2010 - 2012] the dominant breeding female of the Lamar Canyon pack in Yellowstone National Park. Born in 2006 in the Agate Creek pack to Agate Creek Wolves #113M (born a Chief Joseph Wolf in 1997) and Wolf #472F (born a Druid Peak wolf in 2000), she was principally known by the year of her birth. She was a member of the fourth generation of wolves born in Yellowstone after the 1995 reintroduction of wolves to the park. Leaving her birth pack to claim new territory, she established the Lamar Canyon pack as a three-year-old in 2010. The pack's territory in the easily accessible Lamar River Valley (named after Lucius Quintus Cincinnatus Lamar) allowed tourists and wolf researchers to observe and extensively document the activities and behaviours of the wolves. As the dominant breeding female ("alpha female"), O-Six was one of the most visible and photographed wolves in Yellowstone and was described as a "rock star." She was famous for hunting and taking down elk by herself, which is extremely rare as wolves usually hunt in packs.

After several years, O-Six was captured, fitted with a radio-tracking collar and released, gaining the collar number 832F. She produced three litters of pups with her mate, Wolf #755M, before the Lamar Canyon pack was displaced by another wolf pack. Wandering into new territory, the remaining pack members, including O-Six, left the park, where no hunting is allowed, and appeared on private land to the east, near Crandall, Wyoming, during Wyoming's 2012 wolf hunting season. The allowed take in that season was eight wolves. She was shot by a hunter on December 6, 2012, the eighth wolf to be legally killed in Wyoming in 2012.

== Legacy ==
The death of O-Six was immediately reported in the New York Times, leading to extensive coverage of O-Six and wolf-hunting policies surrounding Yellowstone. Following the publication of the bestselling book American Wolf by Nate Blakeslee in 2017, which focused on O-Six's life, O-Six received additional media coverage, and was the subject of a National Geographic documentary. More coverage followed the shooting of O-Six's daughter 926F in Montana in 2018.

== See also ==
- 302M - Another Yellowstone Wolf.
- History of wolves in Yellowstone
- List of wolves
