= Old Ephraim =

Individual grizzly bear

- Other name: Old Three Toes
- Species: Grizzly bear
- Sex: Male
- Died: August 22, 1923
- Nationality: United States
- Appearance: Deformed foot with three toes
- Named after: Folkloric name for the grizzly bear

Old Ephraim (also known as Old Three Toes due to a deformity in his foot) was a large grizzly bear that roamed Logan Canyon, Utah, in the early 20th century. Famous for preying on livestock and evading hunters for over a decade, he was eventually trapped and killed by sheepherder Frank Clark on August 22, 1923. He should not be confused with Three Toes of Harding County, another notorious surplus killing predator with the same nickname. Old Ephraim is remembered as one of the last grizzly bears in Utah.

== Background ==
The name "Old Ephraim" (or "Ol' Ephraim") had been a term popularized in the 19th-century American West to refer to the grizzly bear, and was used in frontier folklore to refer to specific animals. It appears as the name of a bear in a story by P. T. Barnum.

Additionally, Theodore Roosevelt referred to a grizzly bear by the same name in his 1885 book, Hunting Trips of a Ranchman, when discussing a bear in the Bighorn Mountains of Wyoming. This indicates that the name "Old Ephraim" was commonly used in various regions of the American West to describe large, powerful grizzlies. The name may also have biblical origins, referencing the figure Ephraim from the book of Genesis.

The grizzly bear from the Cache National Forest known as "Old Ephraim" was first identified by its distinctive tracks. The bear lived within a large wilderness from as far north as Soda Springs, Idaho to as far south as Weber County, Utah, before settling in Logan Canyon, about 20 miles east of Logan, Utah.

Frank Clark (born 1879 in Cherry Creek, Idaho) was a part-owner of the Ward Clark Sheep Company since his arrival there in July 1911. During his first summer in the Cache National Forest, Clark counted 154 adult domestic sheep that had been killed by bears in the area.

In 1914, Frank Clark set out to stop Old Ephraim. He placed many traps in Old Ephraim's favorite resting and feeding spots, but the traps were always reportedly found disturbed, either removed, un-sprung, or thrown aside. Although Clark seldom saw the bear, dead sheep around the herd indicated its presence. Despite Clark's efforts, Old Ephraim killed more and more sheep without being stopped. He is said to have once killed 50 sheep in a single incident, an example of surplus killing observed in nature.

== The story of Old Ephraim ==
By the early 1920s, Frank Clark had become well-acquainted with Old Ephraim's habits. In the summer of 1923, he set a trap in one of the bear's favorite resting spots, but Old Ephraim reportedly continued to avoid or disable the traps.

On the night of August 22, 1923, Clark was awakened by a loud noise near his camp. Armed with a .25-35 caliber carbine, he went to investigate, initially thinking a horse was in distress. However, upon approaching the creek, he reportedly saw Old Ephraim standing on his hind legs, with a 23-pound bear trap on his paw and a 14-foot chain wrapped around his forelimb. Despite firing several shots, Clark could not stop the bear, who continued advancing, holding the trap above his head. It was only after seven bullets, with the final one hitting the bear in the brain, that Old Ephraim finally collapsed and died.

== The reality behind the legend ==
Many elements of Old Ephraim's story have been exaggerated over time. Initial reports described the bear as standing nearly 10 feet tall and weighing over 1,100 pounds. However, modern analysis of the bear's skull suggests he was closer to 7 feet, 6.5 inches tall and weighed approximately 550 pounds - slightly larger than average but not extremely large as folklore would claim.

=== Date of death ===
There is some uncertainty about the exact date of Old Ephraim's death. While most sources, including Clark's own accounts, place the event on August 22, 1923, some sources—including a 1928 retelling in Nature Magazine—suggest that Old Ephraim may have been killed as early as July 1922. The Smithsonian's records support the earlier date.

== Legacy ==
Old Ephraim's story became a part of the folklore of the American West. Despite Clark's description of Old Ephraim as a bear that only killed what he needed to survive, local stories often depicted the bear as a menace to livestock and people. Old Ephraim's reputation as an “outlaw animal” is similar to that of other notable predators, such as Lobo the King of Currumpaw and the last mountain lions of the West.

A stone monument commemorating Old Ephraim was erected at his gravesite in Logan Canyon in 1966. Designed, lettered, and erected by Max, Arthur, and Howard Jorgensen, the monument stands 11 feet tall, representing the fictional height of the bear as reported in local stories. The monument also features a poem written by Nephi J. Bott:

Old Ephraim, Old Ephraim, your deeds were so wrong,
Yet we build you this marker and sing you this song.
To the king of the forest so mighty and tall,
We salute you, Old Ephraim, the king of them all.

Old Ephraim's skull was exhumed by Logan Boy Scout Troop 43 a few months after his death and sent to the Smithsonian Institution for verification. It remained there until 1978, when it was returned to Utah State University, where it is displayed in the Special Collections at the Merrill-Cazier Library.

In 2024, Utah State University Libraries commemorated the 101st anniversary of Old Ephraim's death with an exhibit titled Old Ephraim: 100 Years of Legend. The exhibit features Old Ephraim's skull, Frank Clark's handwritten account of the encounter, and other artifacts related to the bear.

== Trail to Old Ephraim's grave ==
Old Ephraim's Grave Trail
- Length: 5.4 miles (8.7 km)
- Location: Logan Canyon, Utah
- Use: Hiking, Mountain biking
- Difficulty: Moderate
- Season: Spring through Fall
- Sights: Stone monument, scenic views of Bear River Range
- Hazards: Rocky terrain, wildlife
- Surface: Dirt

Visitors can access the trail to Old Ephraim's grave by traveling to the Right Hand Fork of Logan Canyon. The trailhead is well-marked, and the route follows a path through Ricks Canyon and Steel Hollow. The trail to the gravesite is approximately 5.4 miles one way and offers views of the Bear River Range. The monument stands at the gravesite, marking the location of one of Utah's last known grizzly bears. Additionally, it is a popular destination for hikers and mountain bikers, with the trail being accessible from spring through fall.

== See also ==
- List of individual bears
- Three Toes of Harding County
- Lobo, the King of Currumpaw
- Surplus killing
