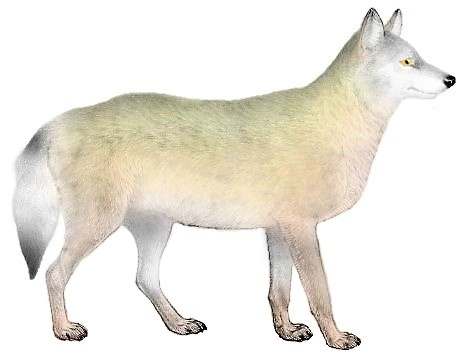
- Illustration based on a description by Edward Alphonso Goldman

Conservation status
- Extinct (1935) (IUCN 3.1)

Scientific classification
- Kingdom: Animalia
- Phylum: Chordata
- Class: Mammalia
- Order: Carnivora
- Family: Canidae
- Genus: Canis
- Species: C. lupus
- Subspecies: †C. l. youngi

Trinomial name
- †Canis lupus youngi Goldman, 1937
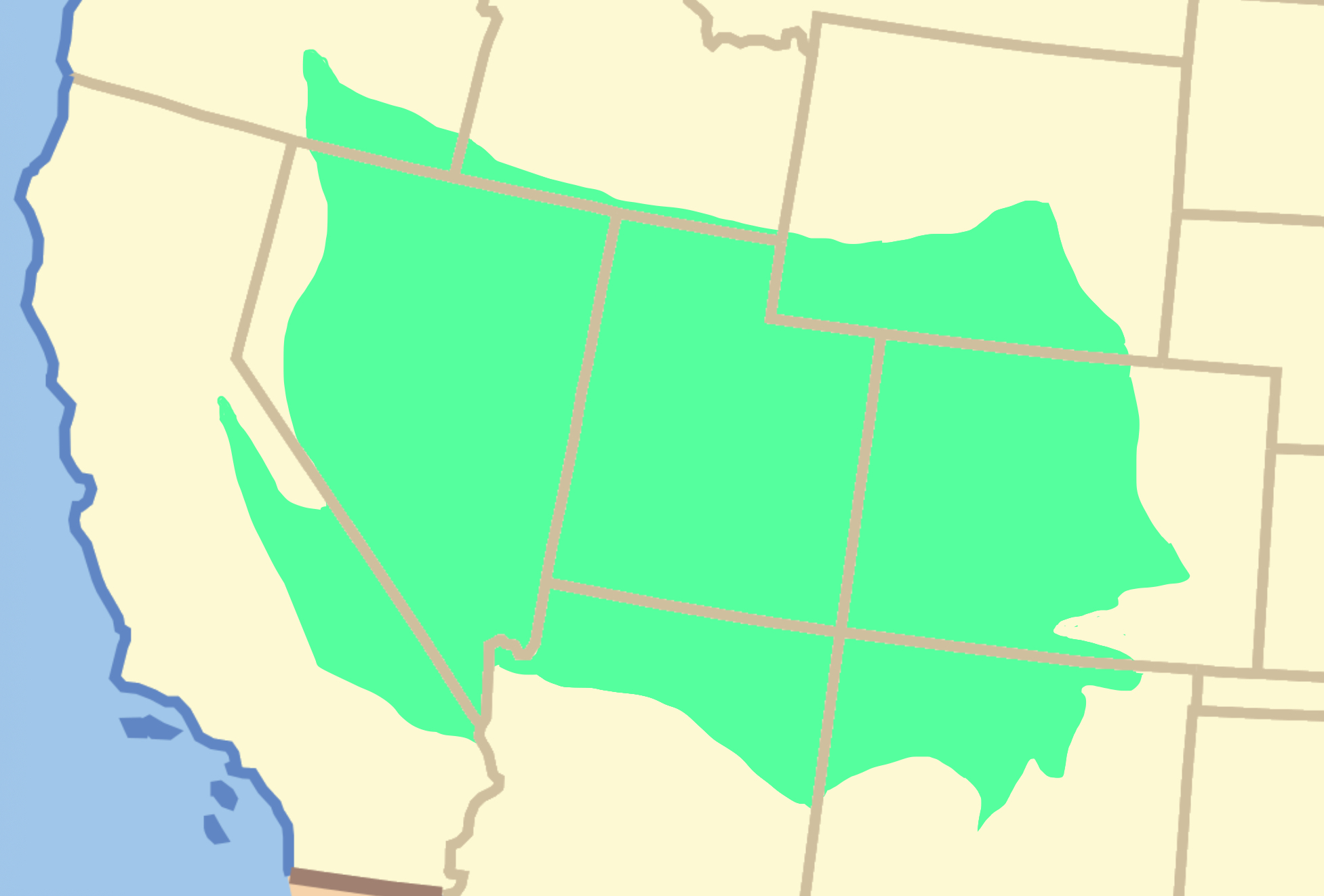
- Former range

= Southern Rocky Mountain wolf =

Southern Rocky Mountains wolf

Extinct subspecies of the gray wolf

The Southern Rocky Mountain wolf (Canis lupus youngi) is an extinct subspecies of gray wolf which was once distributed over southeastern Idaho, southwestern Wyoming, northeastern Nevada, Utah, western and central Colorado, northwestern Arizona (but north of the Grand Canyon), and northwestern New Mexico. It was a light-colored, medium-sized subspecies closely resembling the Great Plains wolf (C. l. nubilus), though larger, with more blackish-buff hairs on the back. This wolf went extinct by 1935. Wolves of the subspecies Canis lupus occidentalis have now been reestablished in Idaho and Wyoming.

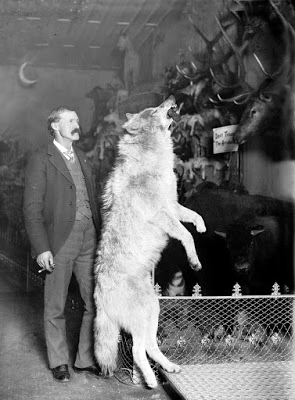
A Southern Rocky Mountain wolf killed in Colorado.

== Taxonomy ==
It is named after Stanley P. Young, who described it with Edward Alphonso Goldman in 1937. This wolf is recognized as a subspecies of Canis lupus in the taxonomic authority Mammal Species of the World (2005).

=== Lineage ===
Gray wolves (Canis lupus) migrated from Eurasia into North America 70,000–23,000 years ago and gave rise to at least two morphologically and genetically distinct groups. One group is represented by the extinct Beringian wolf and the other by the modern populations. One author proposes that the Southern Rocky Mountain wolf forms part of a clade whose ancestors pushed the Mexican wolf's range more southwards.

A 2005 study compared the mitochondrial DNA sequences of modern wolves with those from 34 specimens dated between 1856 and 1915. The historic population was found to possess twice the genetic diversity of modern wolves, which suggests that the mDNA diversity of the wolves eradicated from the western U.S. was more than twice that of the modern population. Some haplotypes possessed by the Mexican wolf, the Great Plains wolf, and the extinct Southern Rocky Mountain wolf were found to form a unique "southern clade". All North American wolves group together with those from Eurasia, except for the southern clade which forms a group that is exclusive to North America. The wide distribution area of the southern clade indicates that gene flow was extensive across the recognized limits of its subspecies.

=== Ancestor ===
In 2021, a mitochondrial DNA analysis of North American wolf-like canines indicates that the extinct Late Pleistocene Beringian wolf was the ancestor of the southern wolf clade, which includes the Mexican wolf and the Great Plains wolf. The Mexican wolf is the most basal of the gray wolves that live in North America today.
