= Lobo wolf =

Lobo wolf may refer to either of two subspecies of gray wolves in the United States:

- Great Plains wolf (Canis lupus nubilus), found throughout the Great Plains
- Mexican wolf (Canis lupus baileyi), native to Arizona, New Mexico, and northern Mexico
