= 926F (Spitfire) =

Wolf from Yellowstone National Park (2011-2018)

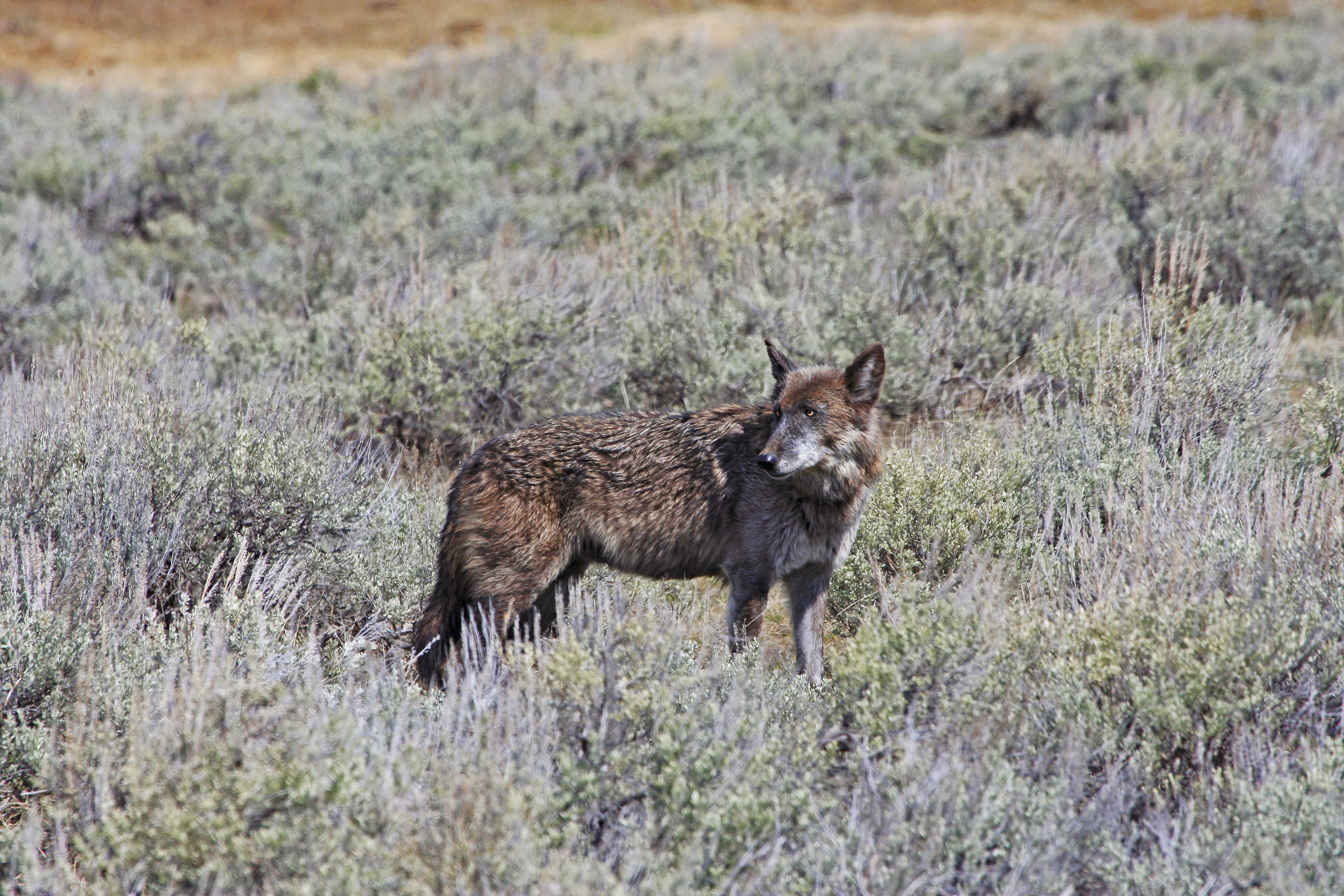
- Wolf 926F at age 7 years in May 2018 (Picture of the NPS / Kira Cassidy)
- Other names: Spitfire; Queen of Wolves
- Species: Gray wolf (Canis lupus)
- Sex: Female
- Born: April 2011; Lamar River Valley, Yellowstone National Park
- Died: 24 November 2018 (7 years 7 months); Montana
- Cause of death: Legal Harvest via firearm
- Known for: Daughter of O-Six (832F); Longtime lead female of the Lamar Canyon Pack (2013 - 2018)
- Residence: Yellowstone National Park
- Parents: 832F (mother); 755M (father)
- Mates: 925M; 949M

926F (Spitfire) (April 2011 – November 2018) was a wild wolf popular with visitors of Yellowstone National Park. She was killed about a mile outside the park boundary by a hunter when she crossed from the park into Montana, where the hunting of wolves was legal.

== Life ==
926F was born in the spring of 2011 in the Lamar River Valley. She was a small, black wolf with a notch in her right ear and a graying face. 926F was the daughter of 832F, a she-wolf who was founder of the Lamar Canyon Pack which has its territory in Yellowstone National Park. She was the great-great-great-granddaughter of wolf "No. 9", one of the first wolves from Alberta, Canada that was reintroduced into Yellowstone in 1995.

When she was just a few months old, her outnumbered pack was attacked by 16 adult wolves from another pack, the Mollies. She and her fellow pups were likely to be killed, but her mother 832F and older sister were able to save them.

The early winter of 2012-2013 was difficult and her pack followed elk herds outside the park boundaries for food. During one of these excursions, her adult packmate, 754M was legally shot and killed by a hunter. A few weeks later, her famous mother, 832F, was also legally shot and killed. These killings left her father, 755M, and the pack only with his daughters. Accordingly, he had to leave the pack for viable mates. The Lamar Canyon pack remained east of Yellowstone Park, but 926F and her older sister returned to Yellowstone.

Upon their return, the sisters met 925M. As her elder sister was "more aggressive and dominant", she quickly paired with 925M. However, 926F was able to woo 925M away from her sister and they became a mating pair in 2013. Wolf 925 and 926F had their first litter in the spring of 2014. This litter had 6 pups: Little T and 5 other pups. Due to severe mange, all but Little-T died within a year. 926F had another litter, with “Dot” the only surviving pup.

Rick McIntyre, a naturalist and former Yellowstone wolf researcher, described an incident in March 2015, in which 926F, who was pregnant, and Wolf 925 led their 11 month old pups into the territory of a rival pack in search of elk to hunt. After killing a cow elk and feeding their pups, 926F and Wolf 925 began to lead the pups back to their own territory, when they were spotted by the 12-member Prospect Peak Pack who began to chase them. Wolf 925 lured the Prospect Peak Pack away from other members of the Lamar Canyon Pack, and Wolf 925 was attacked and died of his injuries. Several days later, a pregnant 926F was found by 4 large males from the Prospect Peak pack. She stood up to the largest male, half again as large as she. "They were growling at each other. It looked certain that she would be killed. Then she started to wag her tail at him. He was confused by that. She romped toward him". And a new pack was formed, who helped raise her new pups.

By the end of 2016, the pack was down to 926F, her two surviving daughters, and 949M. Though 949M mated with both 926F and her daughter, Little T, no pups resulted. By August, 2017, 949M died of illness, likely mange and distemper.

926F became a very popular subject for Yellowstone wolf watchers and photographers. She was one of the stars of the “wolf-watching mecca” of Yellowstone and was called “Queen of Wolves”.

In 2018, 926F ceded the role of breeding female to her daughter, who produced the first surviving pups in three years. Of the five black pups from that breeding season, only two survived the winter of 2017–2018. Her daughter and mate, and her two grandchildren were likely in the vicinity when she was shot, as there are recording of them howling shortly thereafter.

In a tribute to 926F, Rick McIntyre, a naturalist and former Yellowstone wolf researcher, wrote that "until the last moment of her life, no matter what challenges and tragedies she faced, she always figured out a way to survive, to carry on".

== Death ==
On November 24, 2018, 926F was shot and killed between Silver Gate and Cooke City, Montana, after she had crossed a mile outside the park boundaries and was reportedly near cabins. The hunter then "took her body home, placed his license tag on her and skinned her". He disposed of the carcass after meeting with a Montana Department of Fish, Wildlife, and Parks representative, who deemed the killing legal under Montana law. However, some advocacy groups believe that 926F was illegally killed and have called for a boycott of the hunter's business. He has also received death threats since the killing.

After 926F's death, her daughter Little T, Small Dot and the five pups could be heard howling for some time. 926F's daughters Little T and Dot were reported to be the new leaders of the Lamar Canyon Pack. Doug Smith, Yellowstone's wolf biologist, was quoted in the New York Times as saying that "their survival is an open question". Her daughter Little T successfully had 4 surviving pups in 2019 and they are sometimes seen in the Round Prairie or Lamar Valley area.

Mary Cooke, president of Wolves of the Rockies, cited 926F's killing as an example of why the government should strengthen protection for wolves who venture out of Yellowstone into areas where they become legal targets for hunters.

== Legacy ==
On September 26, 2021, three years following the death of 926F, Gloria Straube released the book titled "926 Raindrops - Gift of the Wild" in a tribute to her personal journey in Yellowstone National Park and her experience with Wolf 926F.

== See also ==
- List of wolves
- Yellowstone (British TV series)

== Sources ==
- Horton, Alex (2 December 2018). "A hunter killed a legendary Yellowstone wolf. Years later, her cub died the same way". Washington Post.
- McIntyre, Rick (13 March 2019). "In Memory of Yellowstone Wolf 926F". Outside Online.
- Robbins, Jim (30 November 2018). "A Famous Alpha Wolf's Daughter, Spitfire, is Killed by a Hunter". New York Times.
