= Tiger of Sabrodt =

Wolf specimen

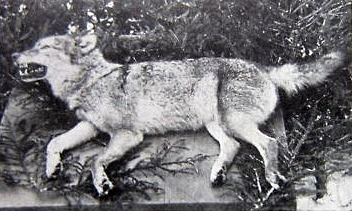
- Species: Gray wolf
- Sex: Female
- Years active: 1904
- Known for: Killing livestock
- Weight: 41 kg (90 lb)
- Height: 80 cm (31 in)
- Named after: Village of Sabrodt (part of Elsterheide) where it first appeared

Tiger of Sabrodt (German: Tiger von Sabrodt; Lower and Upper Sorbian: Tiger ze Zabroda) is the name given to a wolf shot in Lusatia in 1904; it is the last free-living wolf to be shot within the current borders of Germany prior to 1945.

== Death ==
The wolf was shot near the town of Hoyerswerda (then part of Silesia) on 27 February 1904, by a forester who received a 100 mark bounty for killing it. It had broken away from hunters several times and reputedly weighed 41 kilograms (90 lb) and measured 1.60 metres (5 ft 3 in) long and 80 centimetres (31 in) high at the shoulder.

The carcass was mounted and remains on display in the museum in Castle Hoyerswerda. In the meantime wolves have returned to Lusatia, successfully breeding there in 2009.

== See also ==
- List of wolves
