= Dogor =

Mummified wolf puppy

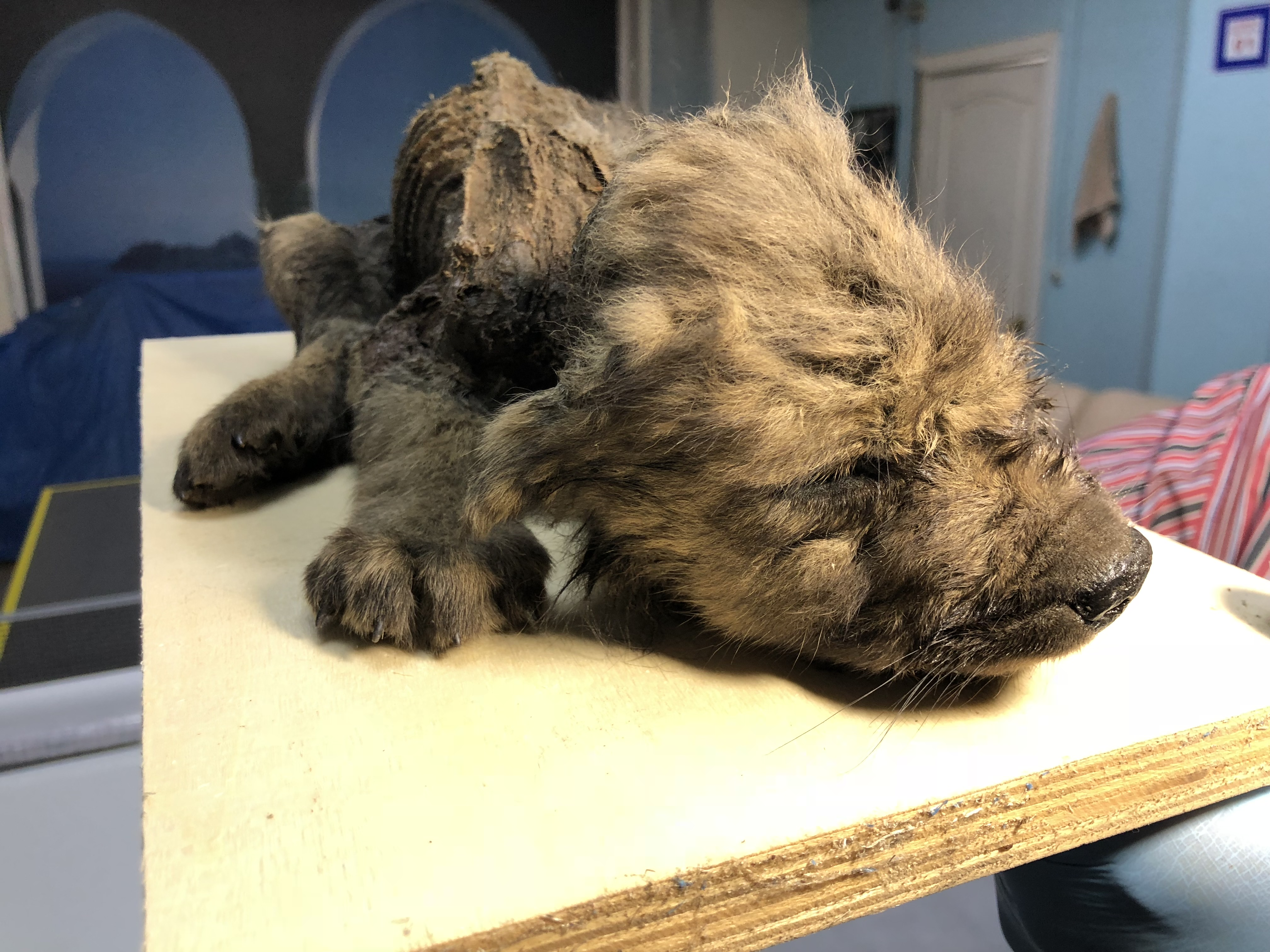
- Common name: Dogor
- Species: Wolf
- Age: c. 18,000 years (aged c. 2 months)
- Place discovered: Sakha, Russia
- Date discovered: 2018

Dogor is a preserved wolf specimen that was found in the Siberian permafrost of Sakha in 2018. It is a remarkably well preserved two-month-old male puppy with fur and whiskers remaining. The animal has been determined to have died around 18,000 years ago. At first, DNA sequencing was unable to identify the animal as either a dog or a wolf. Anders Bergström, a postdoctoral fellow in ancient genomics at the Francis Crick Institute in London, identified Dogor as a wolf as reported in a research study on June 29, 2022 in Nature magazine. However, the specimen did not belong to the ancient east Eurasian progenitor population of wolves from which dogs are thought to have evolved, suggesting perhaps a dual ancestry for dogs.

The specimen was named Dogor by Russian scientists with the local Yakut word meaning 'friend' (Yakut: Догор).

== Description ==
Dogor was found in the permafrost near the Indigirka River, north-east of Yakutsk, Sakha in eastern Siberia during the summer of 2018. It is the body of a two-month-old male canine puppy. The body is remarkably well preserved, and its fur, whiskers, nose, and teeth remain intact. A part of its rib bone was analysed by radiocarbon dating, which placed it at around 18,000 years ago.

== Identification ==
Due to the animal's age, it was possible that it represented an evolutionary link between dogs and wolves. Scientists continue to debate the exact point at which dogs were first domesticated, but if Dogor was determined to be a dog, he would have been the oldest ever discovered. Dogor was, therefore, described as coming from "a very interesting time in terms of wolf and dog evolution", possibly from around the time of the first domestication of dogs.

DNA sequencing is usually sufficient to distinguish between dogs and wolves; however, even after a large amount of analysis, it was not initially possible to determine to which species Dogor belonged. Further DNA sequencing was undertaken in Denmark to provide more insight. Dogor was eventually identified as a wolf in June 2022.

== Gallery ==
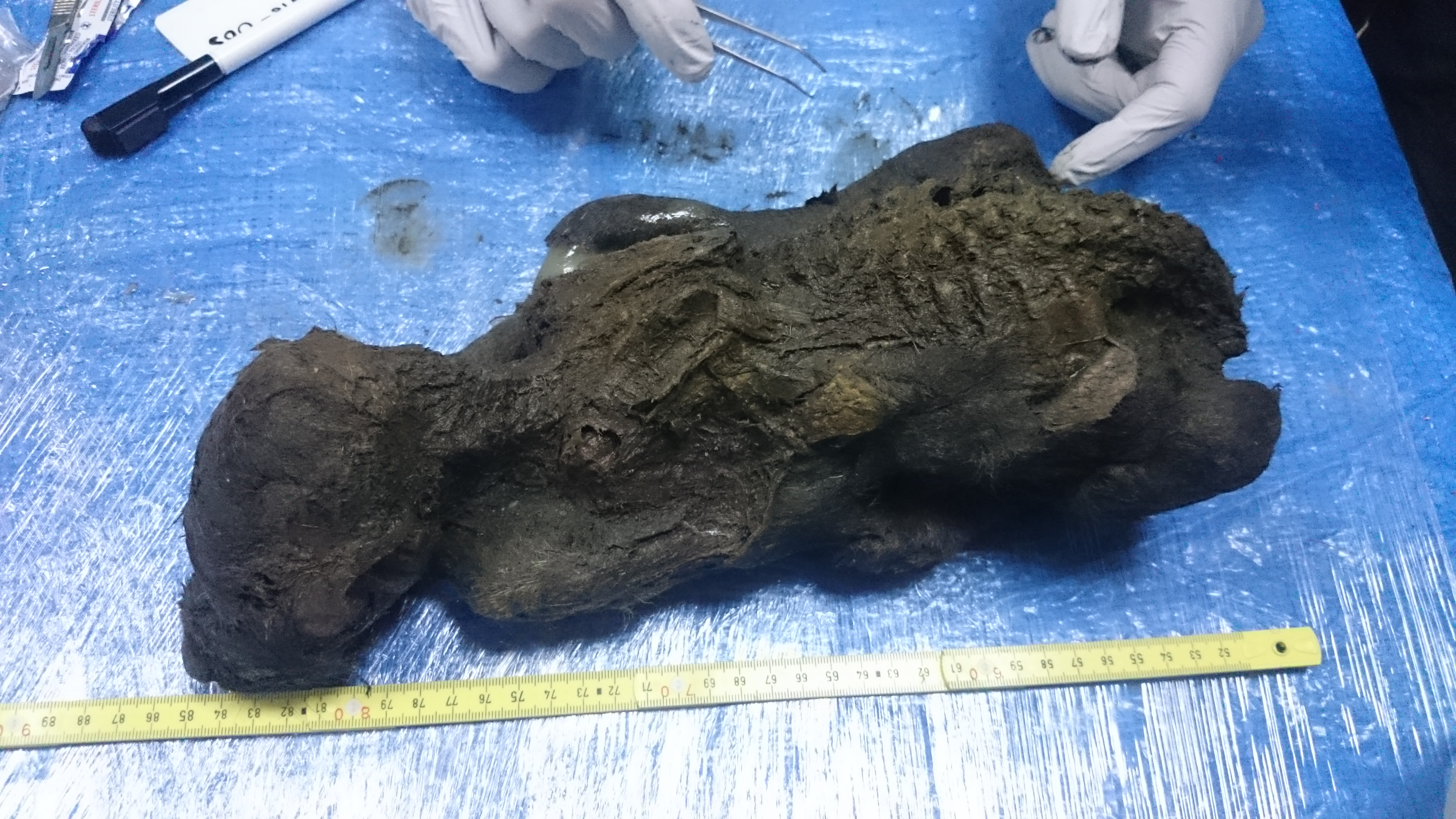

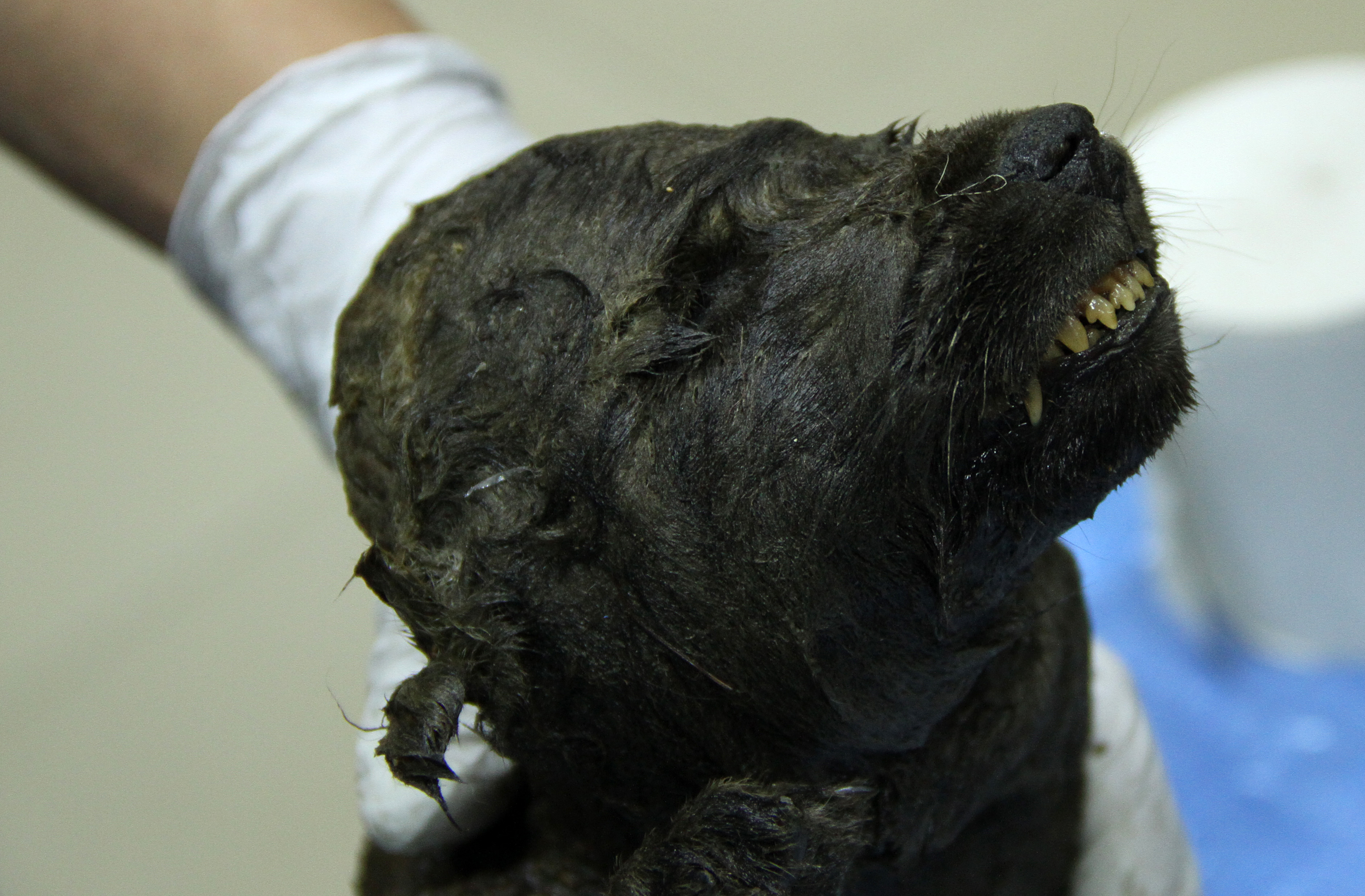

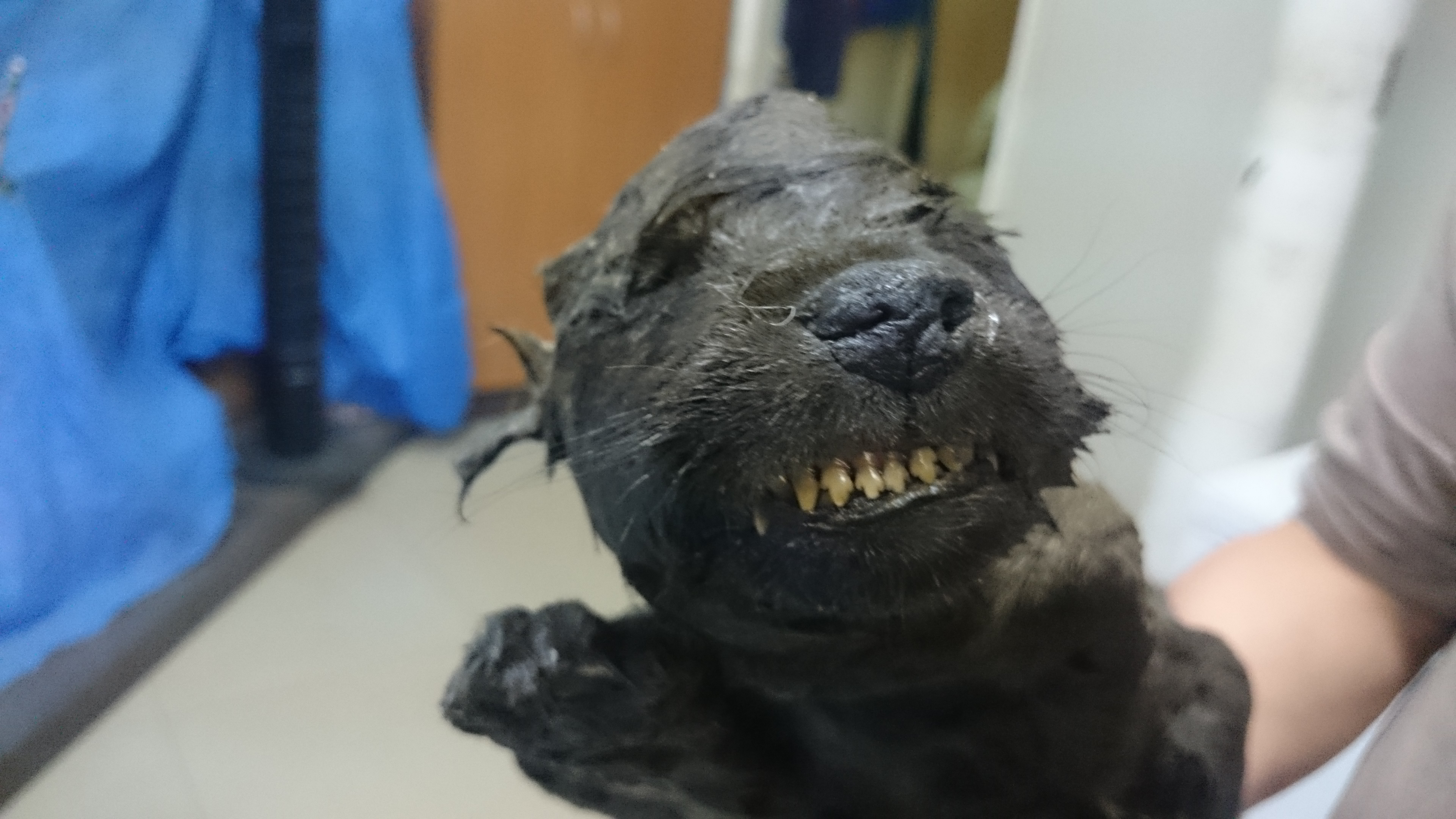

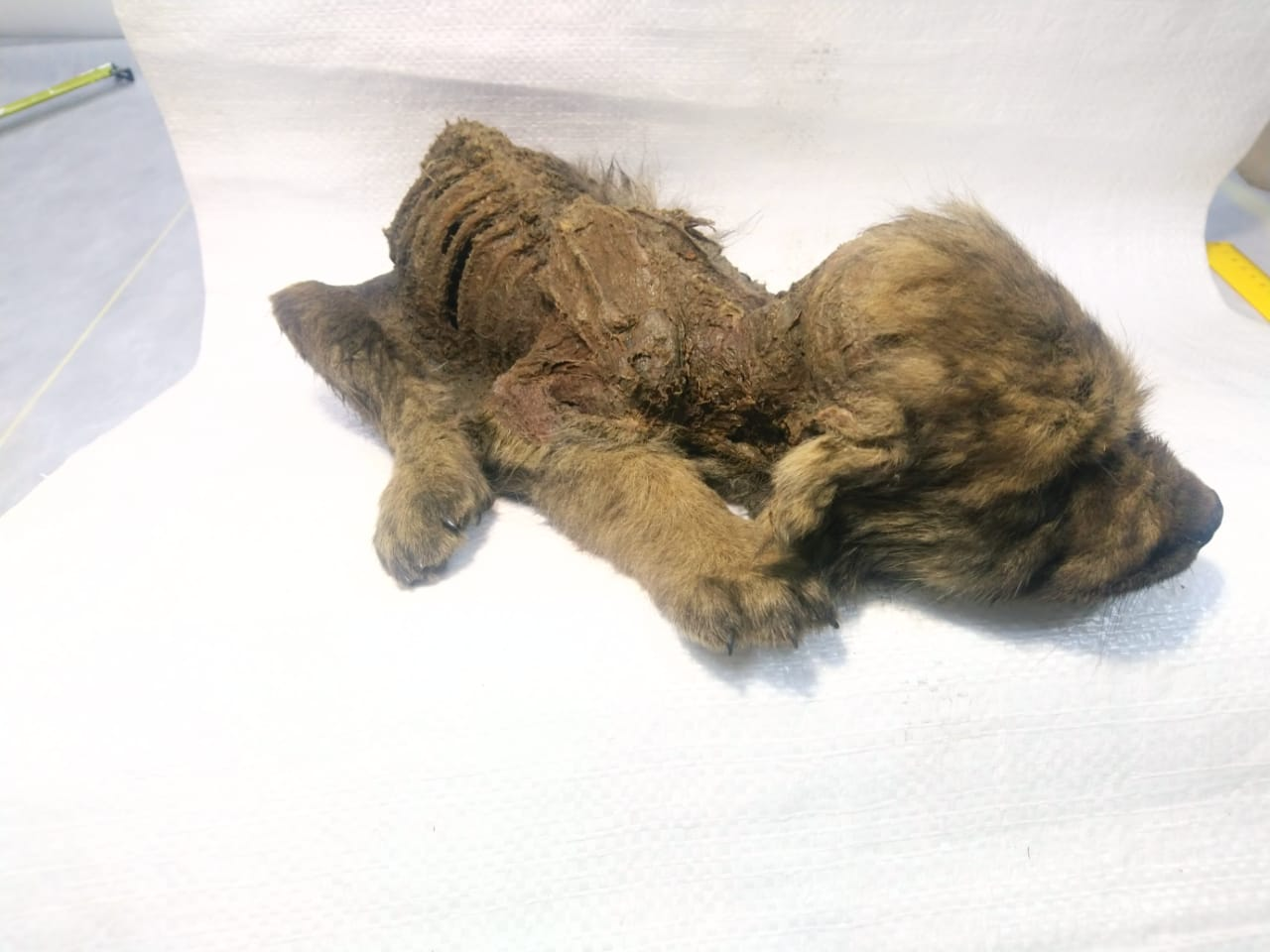

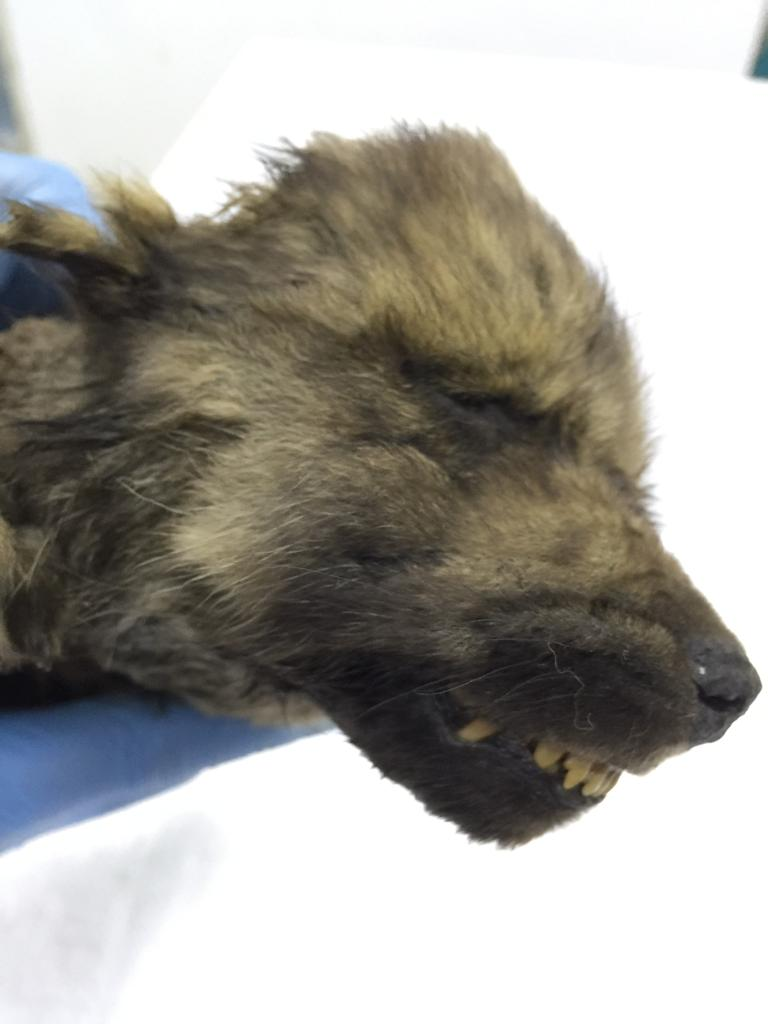

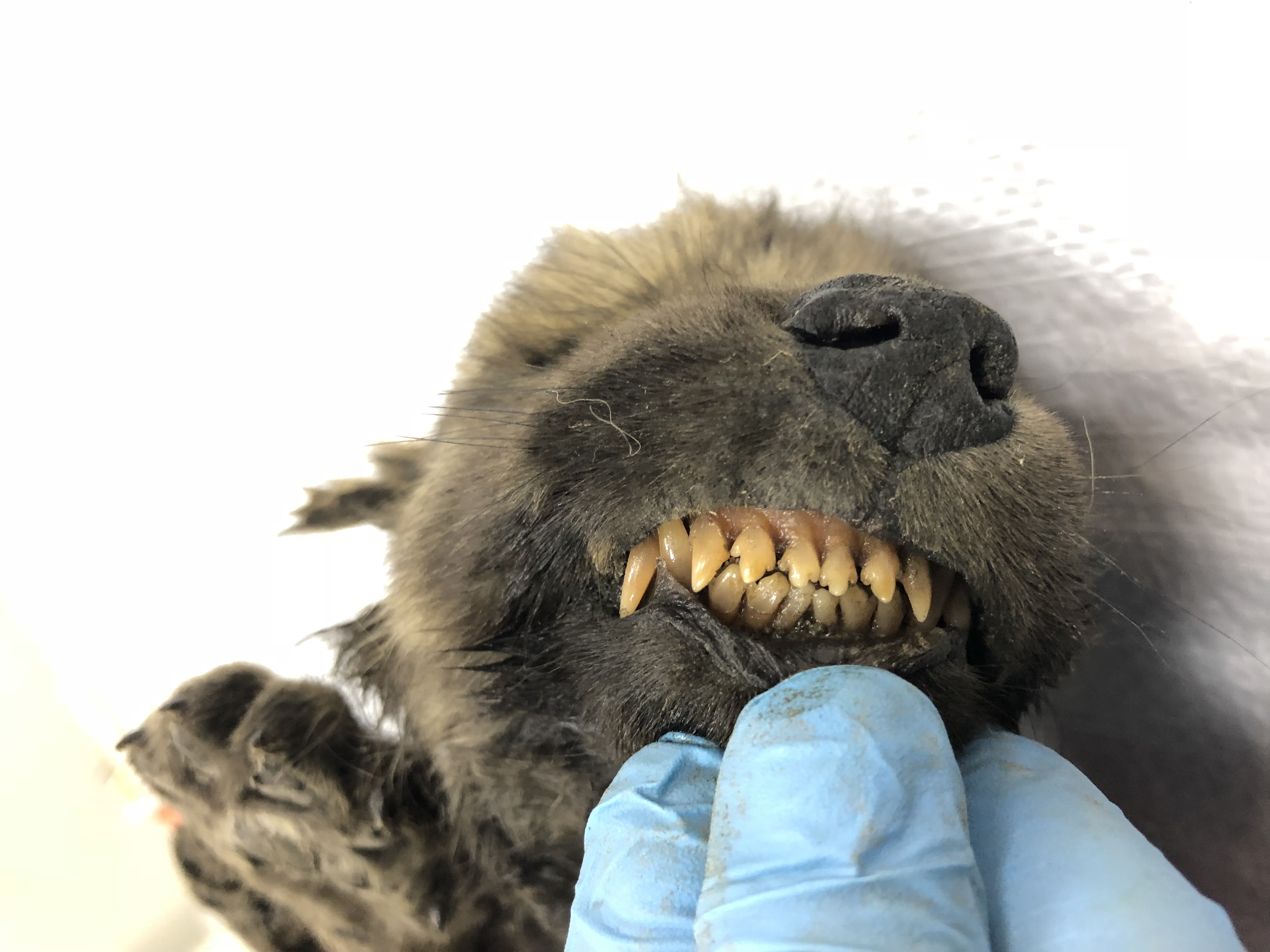

== See also ==
- List of individual wolves
