= Wolves of Hazaribagh =

Wolves of Hazaribagh Attacks
- Location: 23.98°N 85.35°E; Hazaribagh, Bihar, India
- Date: February 15, 1981- August 1981 (1981 attacks); April 1993- April 1995 (1993-1995 attacks)
- Attack type: Animal attack, man-eating wolves
- Deaths: 13 (1981 attacks); 60 (1993-1995 attacks)
- Injuries: 13 (1981 attacks); Approximately 20 (1993-1995 attacks)
- Victim: Children aged 4 to 10 years
- Defenders: Local villagers, hunters, authorities

The Wolves of Hazaribagh were a pack of five man-eating Indian wolves which between February and August 1981, killed 13 children aged from 4 to 10 years. Their hunting range was 2.7 square miles (7 square km) around the town of Hazaribagh in the eastern Indian district of Bihar. They were apparently attracted to the area by the town's rubbish dump, where livestock carcasses and bodies from the local mortuary were often buried, and frequently attracted wolves, striped hyenas, golden jackals and pariah dogs.

One of the first attacks occurred on 15 February 1981, when a wolf entered a yard bordered by brushwood and attacked a young boy. The boy's cries attracted several people, who attacked the wolf with wooden poles, beating it to death. Over the next six months, the remaining wolves killed 13 children and mauled 13 others. On a night of June 1981, they were seen via a headlight to be exhuming and eating a human corpse. During the year, 4 wolves were killed, the last of which, thought to be the dominant male, was caught in a scrub forest and shot.

Another report, titled Human-Wolf Conflict in human dominated landscapes of Ahmednagar District, Maharashtra, states that in the Hazaribagh area, 80 children were attacked - 60 of them fatally - between April 1993 and April 1995 (Rajpurohit 1999). It was thought that five wolf packs were responsible for the attacks. Indeed, Hazaribagh appears to be particularly prone to wolf attacks on children; as attacks have been a regular occurrence over a large area in Hazaribagh from the 1930s onwards (and perhaps even before this), it seems likely that a number of packs have been in operation over the years (Linnell et al. 2002).

== See also ==
- List of wolves
