= 302M =

Notable wolf

- Other name: The Casanova
- Species: Canis lupus
- Breed: Gray Wolf
- Sex: Male
- Born: 2000; Yellowstone National Park
- Died: 2009; Yellowstone National Park
- Cause of death: Fight
- Known for: Featuring in multiple documentaries

302M, also known as "The Casanova" (2000–2009), was a wolf in the Yellowstone Wolf Project. He was featured in the PBS documentary In the Valley of the Wolves and National Geographic's documentary Rise of Black Wolf.

== Early life ==
He was born in 2000 to the Leopold alpha wolves #7F and #2M and was a nephew to famous Druid wolf #21M (#7F's half brother). He dispersed from the pack in 2003 and mingled with the Druid Peak Pack breeding pair's (wolves #21M & #42F) daughters during the breeding season of 2003. Whilst 21M was in charge he raised a litter. The following spring, he opportunistically visited his pups when the Druid Peak Pack breeding pair were away.

== Joined Druid Peak pack ==
Later, in 2004, both breeders of the Druid Peak Pack died. Wolf #42F was killed by another wolf pack in early February 2004 and Wolf #21M was found dead on Specimen Ridge in June 2004. With these events, he joined the pack permanently as the assumed new breeding male. However, his nephew, Wolf #480M stepped up in that role shortly after.

In 2006, only 4 wolves remained (302M, 480M, and two yearling females from the last litter of 21M). The breeding female was collared as Wolf #529F and her sister, Wolf 569F was collared on the last day of 2006.

All 4 wolves bred in 2006 and produced a total of 11 pups in two litters, reviving the famous Druid Pack.

== Left Druid Peak ==
In late 2008, Wolf 302M decided to disperse from the pack with a group of five younger males (his nephews and sons), drifting through rival pack territories until joining four females of the Agate Creek Pack, one adult, one young adult, and two yearlings, to form the Blacktail Plateau pack in late 2008, which 302M began leading. The name of the pack comes from the location their territory was centered on and it was the natal land of Wolf 302M as the Blacktail Plateau was the core of the Leopold Pack territory.

In October 2009, he died from wounds inflicted by other wolves.

== See also ==
- List of wolves
