= Wolf of Soissons =

Man-eating wolf in France

The Wolf of Soissons was a man-eating wolf which terrorized the commune of Soissons northeast of Paris over a period of two days in 1765, attacking eighteen people, four of whom died from their wounds.

== First victim ==
The first victim of the wolf was a pregnant woman, attacked in the parish of Septmont on the last day of February. Locals had taken the second trimester fetus from the womb to be baptized before it died when the wolf struck again not three hundred yards from the scene of the first attack. One woman named Madame d'Amberief and her son survived only by fighting together.

== Subsequent attacks ==
On 1 March, near the hamlet of Courcelles, a man was attacked by the wolf and survived with head wounds. The next victims were two young boys, named Boucher and Maréchal, who were attacked on the road to Paris, both badly wounded. A farmer on horseback lost part of his face to the wolf before escaping to a local mill, where a seventeen-year-old boy was caught unaware and slain. After these attacks, the wolf fled to Bazoches, where it partially decapitated a woman and severely wounded a girl, who ran screaming to the village for help. Four citizens of Bazoches set an ambush at the body of the latest victim, but when the wolf returned it proved to be too much for them and the villagers soon found themselves fighting for their lives. The arrival of more peasants from the village finally put the wolf to flight, chasing it into a courtyard where it fought with a chained dog. When the chain broke the wolf was pursued through a pasture, where it killed a number of sheep, and into a stable, where a servant and cattle were mutilated.

== Death ==
The episode ended when Antoine Saverelle, a former member of the local militia, who was armed only with a pitchfork tracked the wolf to a small lane. The wolf sprang at him but he managed to pin its head to the ground with the instrument, holding it down for roughly fifteen minutes before an armed peasant came to his aid and killed the animal. Saverelle received a reward of 300 livres from King Louis XV for his bravery.

== See also ==
- Beast of Gévaudan
- List of wolf attacks
- List of wolves
- Wolf hunting
- Wolf of Ansbach
