= Wolf of Ansbach =

1685 man-eating wolf of Holy Roman Empire

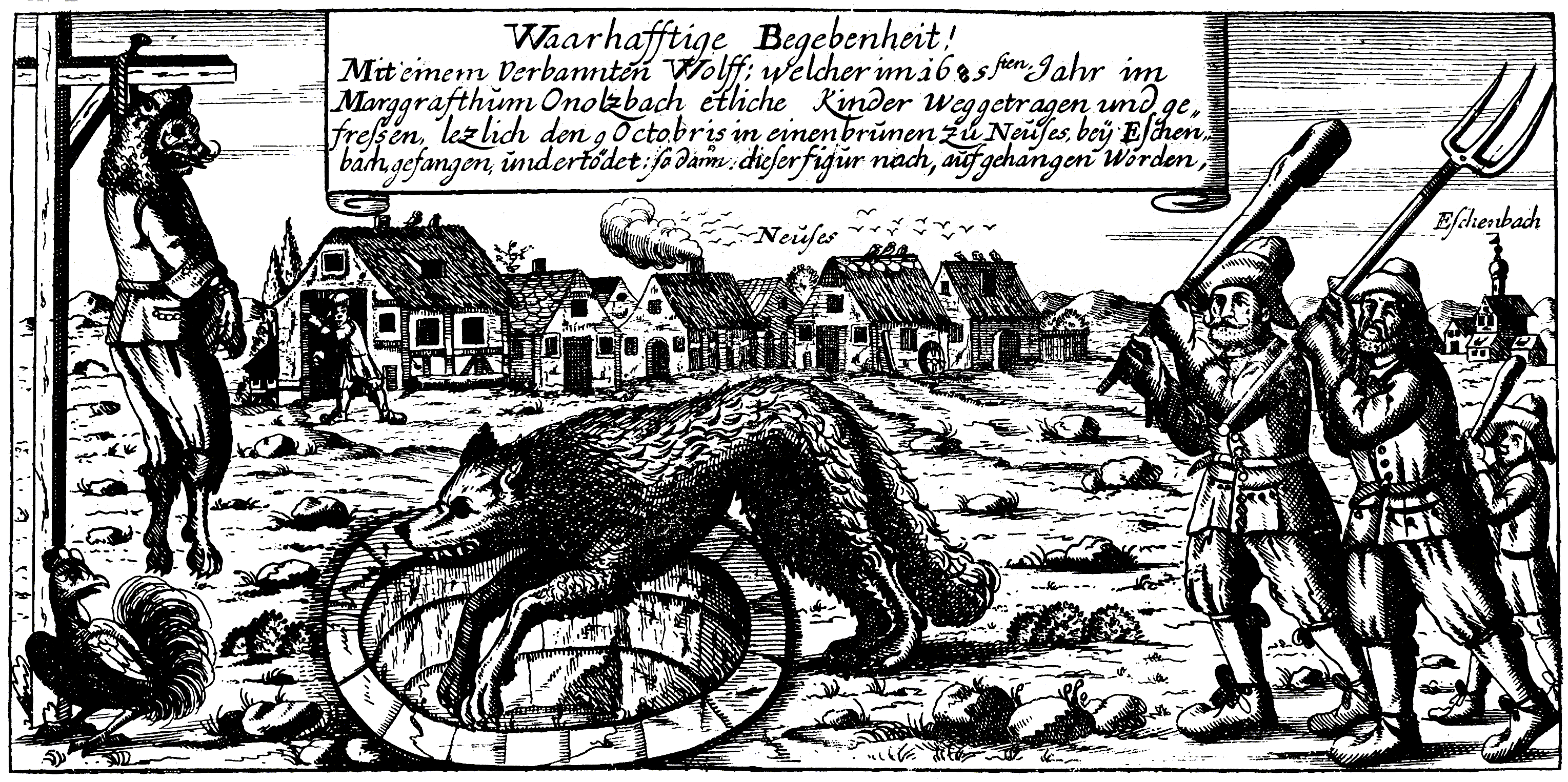
The Wolf of Ansbach, chased into a well, and displayed on a gibbet (left side)

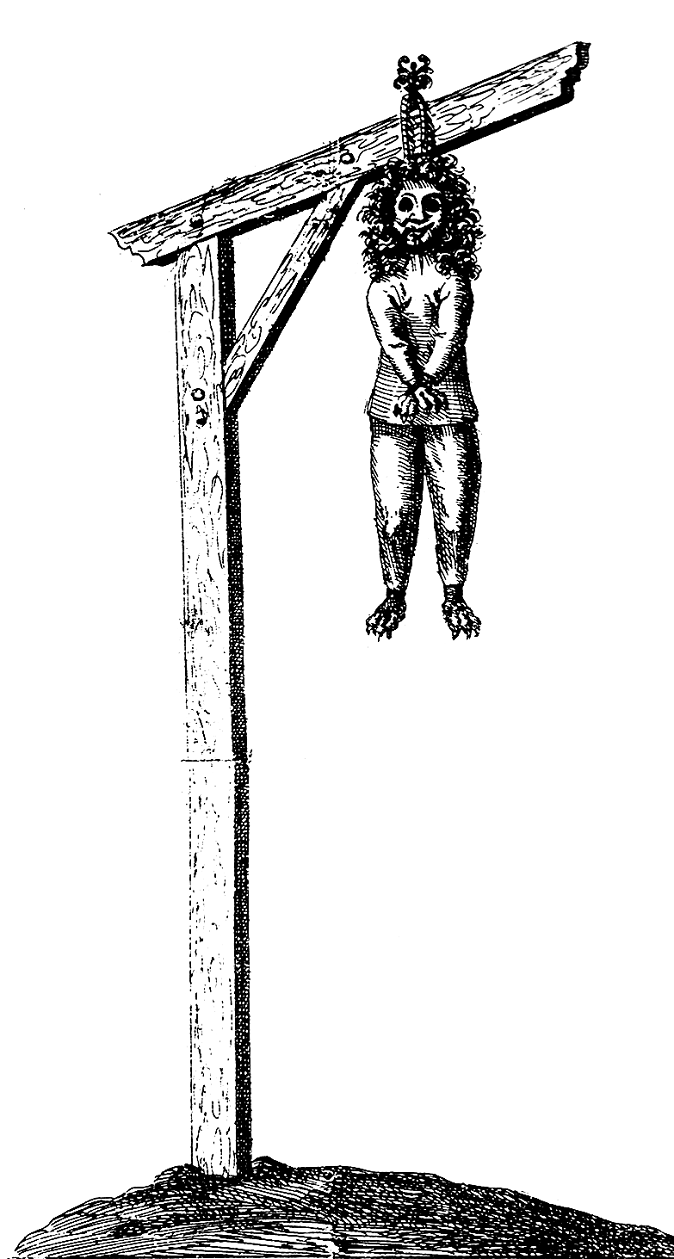
A 1685 German broadsheet print from Neuses in the Margraviate of Onolzbach (Ansbach) depicts the masked and dressed carcass of the Wolf of Ansbach, hanged from a gibbet

The Wolf of Ansbach was a man-eating wolf that attacked and killed an unknown number of people in the Principality of Ansbach in 1685, then a part of the Holy Roman Empire.

== History ==
Initially a nuisance preying on livestock, the wolf soon began attacking children. The citizens of the region of Ansbach believed the animal to be a werewolf, a reincarnation of their late and cruel Pfleger (administrator) Michael Leicht, whose recent death had gone unlamented. During an organized hunt, around Neuses near Eschenbach, the locals succeeded in driving the wolf from a nearby forest and chasing it down with dogs until it leaped into an uncovered well for protection. Trapped, the wolf was slain.

The wolf carcass was paraded through the city marketplace. It was dressed in a man's clothing and, after severing its muzzle, the crowd placed a mask, wig, and beard upon its head, giving it the appearance of the former administrator. The wolf's body was then hanged from a gibbet for all to see until it underwent preservation for permanent display at a local museum.

Franz Ritter von Kobell and other writers wrote poems about the wolf and its actions.

== See also ==
- List of wolf attacks
- List of wolves
- Wolf hunting
- Wolves in folklore, religion and mythology
- Beast of Gévaudan
- Courtaud
