= List of individual wolves =

Wolves are mammals in the genus Canis. While the term "wolf" most commonly refers to the grey wolf, it may also refer to closely related species such as the African wolf or Ethiopian wolf, as well as more distantly related species such as the dire wolf.

== Notable wolves ==
- 302M, a wolf featured in PBS and National Geographic documentaries
- 926F (Spitfire), a wolf popular with visitors of Yellowstone National Park, USA
- Beast of Gévaudan, a man-eating animal in France speculated to be a wolf
- Custer Wolf, a grey wolf held responsible for extensive damage to livestock
- Dogor, a preserved specimen found in Siberian permafrost
- Hexham wolf, a wolf that escaped a zoo and killed livestock in 1904
- Jed, a wolf-dog hybrid known for acting in films
- Lichtenmoor Strangler, an unknown predator in Germany speculated to be a wolf
- Lobo the King of Currumpaw, a grey wolf from New Mexico
- Maya, a cloned arctic wolf
- OR-7, a male grey wolf from Oregon, USA
- O-Six, a female grey wolf from Yellowstone National Park, USA
- Romeo, a black wolf in Alaska
- Romulus, Remus, and Khaleesi, three genetically modified grey wolves
- Slavc, a male wolf that was electronically tracked by the University of Ljubljana's Biology department between July 2011 and August 2012
- Takaya, a lone wolf in British Columbia
- Thornton Wolf, a fossil wolf from England
- Three Toes of Harding County, a solitary North American male Great Plains wolf
- Tiger of Sabrodt, the last free-living wolf to be shot within the current borders of Germany prior to 1945
- Wolf of Ansbach, a man-eating wolf from the Holy Roman Empire
- Wolf of Gubbio, a tame wolf attested in the hagiography of Francis of Assisi
- Wolf of Gysinge, a man-eating wolf from Sweden
- Wolf of Soissons, a man-eating wolf from France
- Wolves of Ashta, a pack of man-eating wolves from Ashta, India
- Wolves of Hazaribagh, a pack of man-eating wolves from Hazaribagh, India
- Wolves of Turku, a pack of man-eating wolves from Finland

== See also ==
- Wolf (disambiguation)
- List of fictional wolves
- List of gray wolf populations by country
