= Surplus killing =

Animal and human predatory behavior

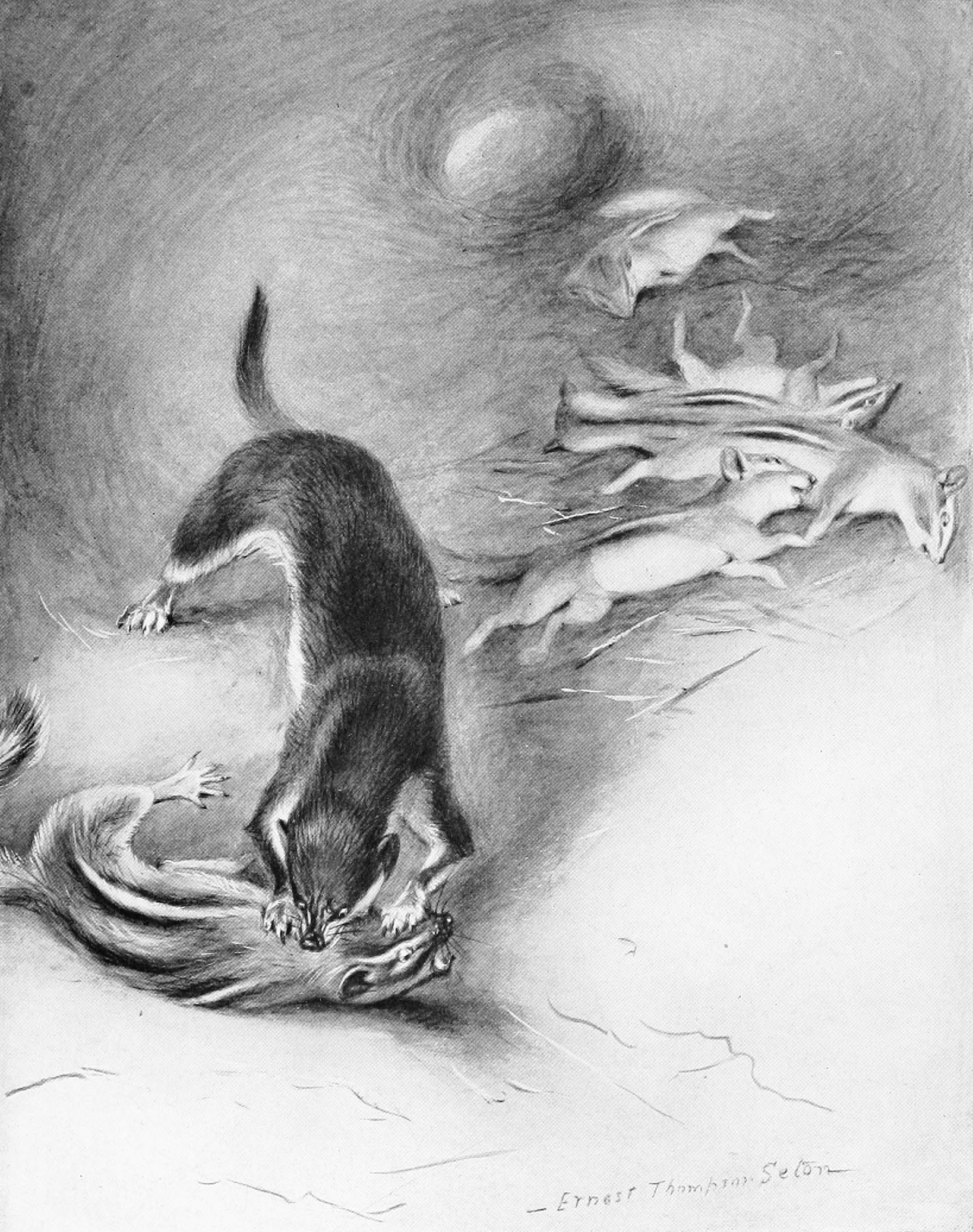
A stoat surplus killing chipmunks (Ernest Thompson Seton, 1909)

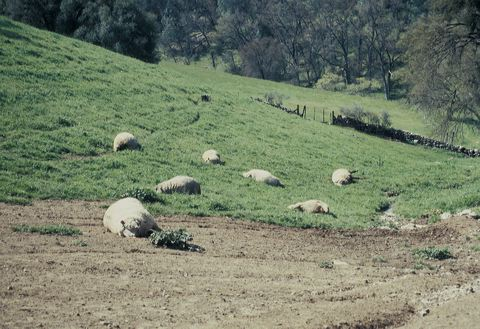
Multiple sheep killed by a cougar

Surplus killing, also known as excessive killing, henhouse syndrome, or overkill, is a common behavior exhibited by predators, in which they kill more prey than they can immediately eat and then they either cache or abandon the remainder. The term was invented by Dutch biologist Hans Kruuk after studying spotted hyenas in Africa and red foxes in England.

== Species ==
Some animals which have been observed engaging in surplus killing hunt alone, while some are mainly pack hunters. Humans also engage in surplus killing.

The behavior has been observed in brown bears, American black bears, polar bears, leopards, lions, lynxes, wolves, coyotes, red foxes, dogs, martens, weasels, honey badgers, minks, raccoons, spotted hyenas, orcas, zooplankton, damselfly naiads, and spiders.

== Example cases ==
In Tasmania, in a single dog attack, 58 little penguins were killed. In mainland Australia, a single fox once killed around 74 penguins over several days, eating almost nothing. One leopard in Cape Province, South Africa killed 51 sheep and lambs in a single incident. Similarly, two caracal in Cape Province killed 22 sheep in one night, eating only part of the buttock of one carcass. Up to 19 spotted hyenas once killed 82 Thomson's gazelle and badly injured 27, eating just 16%.

In late autumn, least weasels often surplus-kill vole and then dig them up and eat them on winter days when it is too cold to hunt. In March 2016, a pack of 9 grey wolves in Wyoming was found to have killed 19 elk. John Lund, of the Wyoming Game and Fish Department, said that he had never documented surplus killings that extreme from grey wolves. In Florida, laboratory experiments documented cases of surplus killing in larvae of the predatory midge Corethrella appendiculata against specific larval stages of different species of mosquitoes of the genus Toxorhynchites.

== Possible causes ==
In surplus killing, predators eat only the most-preferred animals and animal parts. Bears engaging in surplus killing of salmon are more likely to eat unspawned fish because of higher muscle quality, and high-energy parts such as brains and eggs. Surplus killing can deplete the overall food supply, waste predator energy and risk them getting injured. Nonetheless, researchers say animals surplus-kill whenever they can, in order to procure food for offspring and others, to gain valuable killing experience, and to create the opportunity to eat the carcass later when they are hungry again.

== See also ==
- Old Ephraim
- Three Toes of Harding County

== Bibliography ==
- Jennifer L. Maupin and Susan Reichert, Superfluous killing in spiders.
- Joseph K. Gaydos, Stephen Raverty, Robin W. Baird, and Richard W. Osborne, SUSPECTED SURPLUS KILLING OF HARBOR SEAL PUPS (PHOCA VITULINA) BY KILLER WHALES (ORCINUS ORCA) .
- William G. George and Timothy Kimmel, A Slaughter of Mice by Common Crows.
- Wildlife Online: Foxes-Surplus Killing, Why do foxes kill to excess....
- For Wolves: Ralph Maughan Wolf Report, Jackson Trio makes some surplus kills .
- High Country News, Zachary Smith, Wolf pack wiped out for ‘surplus killing’ .
- Victor Van Ballenberghe, Technical Information on Wolf Ecology and Wolf/Prey Relationships.
- Pierre-Yves Daoust, Andrew Boyne, Ted D’Eon, Surplus killing of Roseate Terns and Common Terns by a mink.
