= Three Toes of Harding County =

Wolf killed in 1925

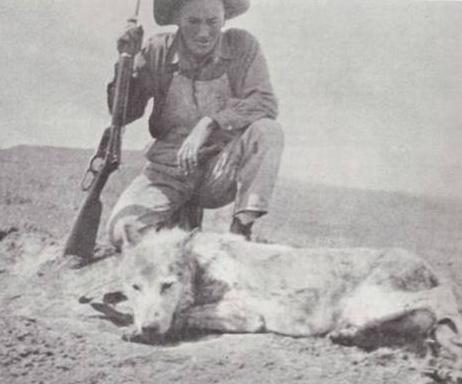
Clyde F. Briggs stands over Three Toes of Harding County

Three Toes of Harding County was the nickname given to a solitary male Great Plains wolf who killed livestock at ranches in Harding County, South Dakota, United States, over a thirteen-year period in the early 20th century. His hunting range extended into southwestern North Dakota and southeastern Montana.

Three Toes began his depredations in 1912, becoming a fully fledged livestock killer by 1917. He was estimated to have killed $50,000 worth of livestock in his thirteen-year career. In an example of surplus killing he is known to have killed 66 sheep in two nights shortly before his capture. He was pursued by over 150 men, only to be trapped on July 23, 1925, in the Kahoun pasture, near Gallup, South Dakota, by Clyde F. Briggs, the state deputy predatory animal inspector.

Three Toes was initially planned to be taken to Buffalo alive, though he died prematurely. He was thought to have been 20 years old, and measured 6 feet (1.8 m) in length and weighed between 75 and 80 pounds (34 and 36 kg).

== See also ==
- List of wolves
- Lobo the King of Currumpaw
- Surplus killing
