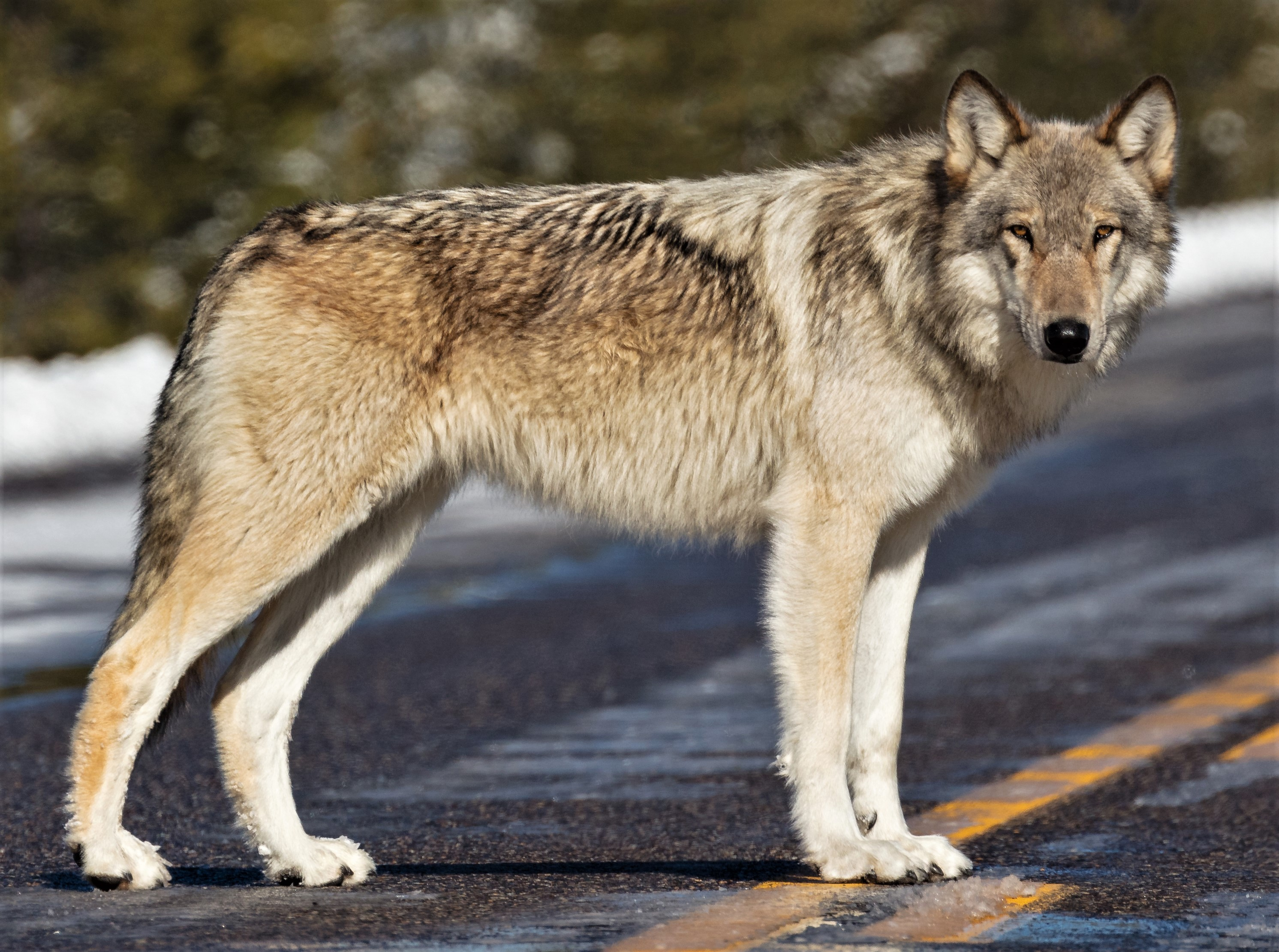
- Northwestern wolf in Yellowstone National Park

Conservation status
- Apparently Secure (NatureServe)

Scientific classification
- Kingdom: Animalia
- Phylum: Chordata
- Class: Mammalia
- Infraclass: Placentalia
- Order: Carnivora
- Family: Canidae
- Genus: Canis
- Species: C. lupus
- Subspecies: C. l. occidentalis

Trinomial name
- Canis lupus occidentalis Richardson, 1829

Synonyms
- ater (Richardson, 1829); sticte (Richardson, 1829); Canis occidentalis (Richardson, 1829)

= Northwestern wolf =

Northwestern wolf Temporal range: Late Pleistocene–recent

Subspecies of mammal

The northwestern wolf (Canis lupus occidentalis), also known as the Mackenzie Valley wolf, Alaskan timber wolf, or Canadian timber wolf, is a subspecies of gray wolf in western North America. Arguably the largest gray wolf subspecies in the world, it ranges from Alaska, the upper Mackenzie River Valley; southward throughout the western Canadian provinces, aside from prairie landscapes in its southern portions, as well as the Northwestern United States.

== Taxonomy ==
This wolf is recognized as a subspecies of Canis lupus in the taxonomic authority Mammal Species of the World (2005). The subspecies was first written of by Scottish naturalist Sir John Richardson in 1829. He chose to give it the name occidentalis in reference to its geographic location rather than label it by its color, as it was too variable to warrant such.

=== Lineage ===
Gray wolves (Canis lupus) migrated from Eurasia into North America 70,000–23,000 years ago and gave rise to at least two morphologically and genetically distinct groups. One group is represented by the extinct Beringian wolf and the other by the modern populations.

According to one source, phylogenetic analyses of North American gray wolves show that there are three clades corresponding to C. l. occidentalis, C. l. nubilus and C. l. baileyi, each one representing a separate invasion into North America from distinct Eurasian ancestors. C. l. occidentalis, the most northwestern subspecies, is descended from the last gray wolves to colonize North America. It likely crossed into North America through the Bering land bridge after the last ice age, displacing C. l. nubilus populations as it advanced, a process which has continued until present times. Along with C. l. nubilus, C. l. occidentalis is the most widespread member of the four gray wolf subspecies in North America, with at least six different synonyms.

== Description ==
Northwestern wolves are one of the largest subspecies of wolves. In British Columbia, Canada, five adult females averaged 42.5 kg (94 lb) with a range of 85 to 100 lb (39 to 45 kg) and ten adult males averaged 112.2 lb (50.9 kg) with a range of 105 to 135 lb (48 to 61 kg), with a weight range for all adults of 38.6 to 61.2 kg (85 to 135 lb). In Yellowstone National Park, adult females were average about 40 kg (88 lb) and adult males average about 50 kg (110 lb), with a mean adult body mass in winter of 46.4 kg (102 lb). More recent studies have reported the average range of height and weight in the north-west of the United States, both sexes were between 68 and 91.5 cm (26.8 and 36.0 in) tall at the shoulder. Here the weight of males was reported at between 45 and 72 kg (99 and 159 lb), while the females were reported at 36 to 60 kg (79 to 132 lb).

The Northwestern wolf is also one of the longest wolf subspecies, as its length usually ranges from 5 to 6 ft (1.5 to 1.8 m) and can reach as long as 7 ft (2.1 m).

In comparison, the mean adult weights of its nearest rivals in size, the Eurasian wolf (C. l. lupus) and the Interior Alaskan wolf (C. l. pambasileus), was reported as 39 kg (86 lb) and 40 kg (88 lb), respectively. Sir John Richardson described the northwestern wolf as having a more robust build than the Eurasian wolf, with a larger, rounder head and a thicker, more obtuse muzzle. Its ears are also shorter, and its fur bushier.

== Reintroduction ==
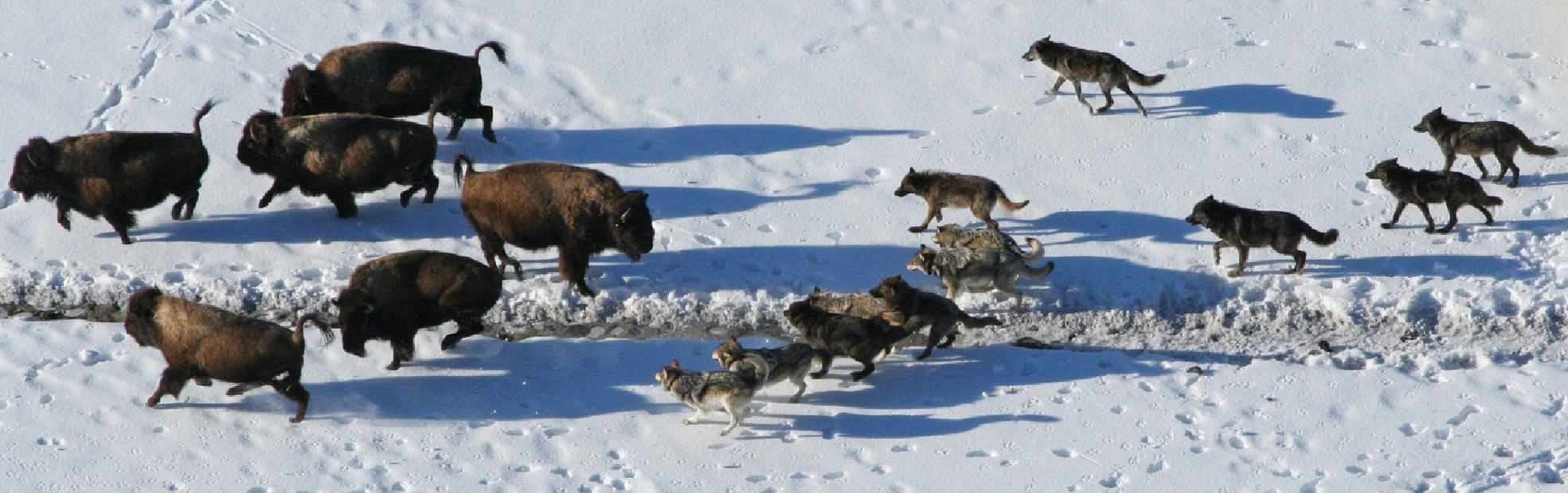
Wolves hunting bison in Yellowstone National Park

In Yellowstone National Park, reintroduced northwestern wolves have been well-documented feeding on elk. They usually stampede the herd using pack teamwork to separate the younger elk from the adults. They also will charge young calves separated from their parents. Winter-weakened or sick elk also play an important part of Yellowstone wolf diets, and it is estimated that over 50 percent of winter-weakened or sick elk in Yellowstone are killed by wolves. Of these, about 12 percent of carcasses were scavenged by other predators, including ravens, bald eagles, black bears, grizzly bears, and coyotes. In the same national park, wolves also prey on bison, though such attacks usually involve sick animals or calves because healthy, adult bison can easily kill wolves with their hooves.

Wolves are present in Canadian and British safari parks including Longleat, Woburn, and Parc Omega.
