= Leopard attack =

Attacks by leopards

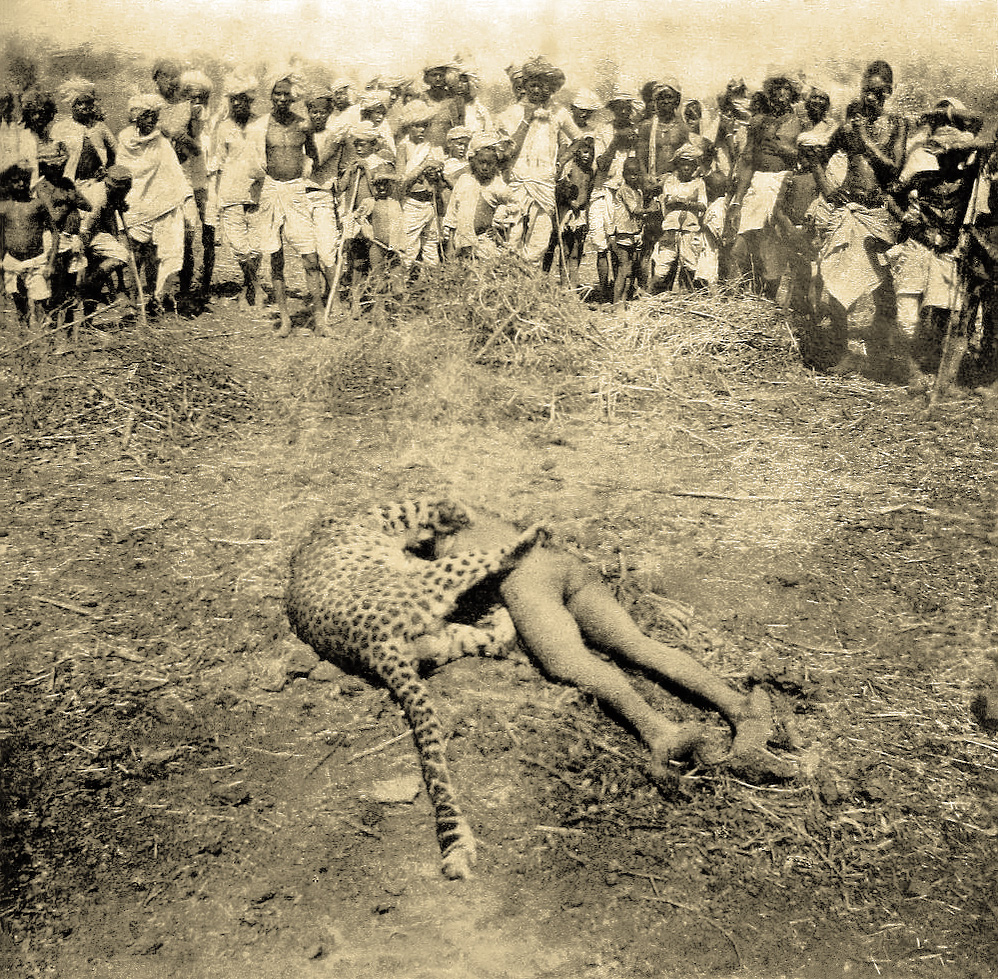
The Gunsore man-eater (credited with killing at least 20 people) after it was shot by British officer W. A. Conduitt on 21 April 1901. The leopard was killed on top of its last victim, a child from Somnapur village in present-day Seoni district, Madhya Pradesh, India.

Leopard attacks are attacks inflicted upon humans, other leopards and other animals by the leopard. The frequency of leopard attacks on humans varies by geographical region and historical period. Despite the leopard's (Panthera pardus) extensive range from sub-Saharan Africa to Southeast Asia, attacks are regularly reported only in India and Nepal. Among the five "big cats", leopards have been known to become man-eaters despite their smaller size compared to lions and tigers—only jaguars and snow leopards have a less fearsome reputation. However, leopards are established predators of non-human primates, sometimes preying on species as large as the western lowland gorilla. Other primates may make up 80% of the leopard's diet. While leopards generally avoid humans, they tolerate proximity to humans better than lions and tigers, and often come into conflict with humans when raiding livestock.

Indian leopard attacks may have peaked during the late nineteenth and early twentieth centuries, coinciding with rapid urbanization. Attacks in India are still relatively common, and in some regions of the country leopards kill more humans than all other large carnivores combined. The Indian states of Gujarat, Himachal Pradesh, Maharashtra, Uttarakhand, and West Bengal experience the most severe human–leopard conflict. In Nepal, most attacks occur in the midland regions (the Terai, midhills, and lesser Himalaya). One study concluded that the rate of leopard predation on humans in Nepal is 16 times higher than anywhere else, resulting in approximately 1.9 human deaths annually per million inhabitants, averaging 55 kills per year. In the former Soviet Central Asia, leopard attacks have been reported in the Caucasus, Turkmenia (present day Turkmenistan), and the Lankaran region of present-day Azerbaijan. Rare attacks have occurred in China.

== Leopard predation on hominids ==
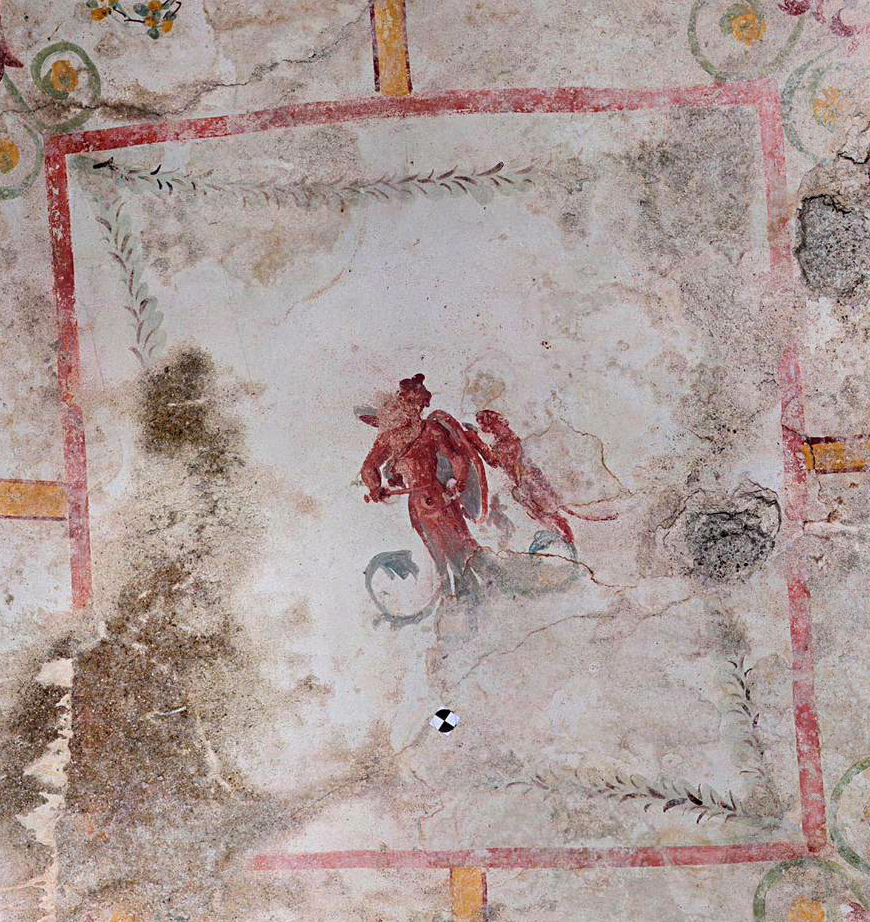
Panther attacks a man. Roman fresco in the Sala della Sfinge, Domus Aurea, Rome, 65-68 A.D.

In 1970, South African paleontologist C. K. Brain showed that a juvenile Paranthropus robustus individual, SK 54, had been killed by a leopard at Swartkrans in Gauteng, South Africa approximately 1.8 million years ago. The SK 54 cranium bears two holes in the back of the skull—holes that perfectly match the width and spacing of lower leopard canine teeth. The leopard appears to have dragged its kill into a tree to eat in seclusion, much like leopards do today. Numerous leopard fossils have been found at the site, suggesting that the felids were predators of early hominids. The revelation that these injuries were not the result of interpersonal aggression but were leopard-inflicted dealt a fatal blow to the then-popular killer ape theory. Another hominid fossil consisting of a 6-million-year-old Orrorin tugenensis femur (BAR 1003'00), recovered from the Tugen Hills in Kenya, preserves puncture damage tentatively identified as leopard bite marks. This fossil evidence, along with modern studies of primate–leopard interaction, has fueled speculation that leopard predation played a major role in primate evolution, particularly on cognitive development.

== Human–leopard conflict ==
Reducing human–leopard conflict has proven difficult. Conflict tends to increase during periods of drought or when the leopard's natural prey becomes scarce. Shrinking leopard habitat and growing human populations also increase conflict. In Uganda, retaliatory attacks on humans increased when starving villagers began expropriating leopards' kills (a feeding strategy known as kleptoparasitism). The economic damage resulting from loss of livestock to carnivores caused villagers in Bhutan's Jigme Singye Wangchuck National Park to lose more than two-thirds of their annual cash income in 2000, with leopards blamed for 53% of the losses. Like other large carnivores, leopards are capable of surplus killing. Under normal conditions, prey are too scarce for this behavior, but when the opportunity presents itself leopards may instinctually kill in excess for later consumption. One leopard in Cape Province, South Africa killed 51 sheep and lambs in a single incident.

Translocation (the capture, transport, and release) of "problem leopards", as with other territorial felids, is generally ineffective: translocated leopards either immediately return or other leopards move in and claim the vacant territory. One translocated leopard in Cape Province traveled nearly 500 kilometres (310 mi) to return to his old territory. Translocations are also expensive, tend to result in high mortality (up to 70%), and may make leopards more aggressive towards humans, thus failing as both a management and a conservation strategy. Historically, lethal control of problem animals was the primary method of conflict management. Although this remains the situation in many countries, leopards are afforded the highest legal protection in India under the Wildlife Protection Act of 1972—only man-eaters can be killed and only when they are considered likely to continue to prey on humans. In Uttarakhand, the state with the most severe human–leopard conflict, 45 leopards were legally declared man-eaters and shot by wildlife officials between 2001 and 2010.

Where legal, herders may shoot at leopards who prey on their livestock. An injured leopard may become an exclusive predator of livestock if it is unable to kill normal prey, since domesticated animals typically lack natural defenses. Frequent livestock-raiding may cause leopards to lose their fear of humans, and shooting injuries may have caused some leopards to become man-eaters. There has been increasing acceptance that the "problem leopard" paradigm may be anthropomorphization of normal carnivore behavior, and that translocations are unlikely to stop livestock depredation. In an effort to reduce the shooting of "problem leopards" and lessen the financial burden on herders, some governments provide monetary compensation, although the sum is often less than the value of the lost livestock.

Number of human deaths due to leopard attacks^{†}
Country	Region	Deaths	Year(s)	Ref
India	Indian subcontinent ^{‡}	11,909	1875–1912	
India	Bhagalpur district, Bihar	350	1959–1962	
India	Uttarakhand	239	2000–2007	
India	Throughout India (mainly Uttarakhand)	170	1982–1989	
India	Pauri Garhwal district, Uttarakhand	140	1988–2000	
India	Garhwal division, Uttarakhand	125	1918–1926	
India	Gujarat	105	1994–2007	
India	Uttar Pradesh	95	1988–1998	
India	Junagadh district, Gujarat	29	1990–2012	
India	Pune district, Maharashtra	18	2001–2003	
India	Jammu and Kashmir	17	2004–2007	
India	Sanjay Gandhi National Park, Maharashtra	16	1986–1996	
India	North Bengal	15	1990–2008	
India	Mandi district, Himachal Pradesh	13	1987–2007	
India	Chikkamagaluru district, Karnataka	11	1995	
India	Kanha National Park, Madhya Pradesh	8	1961–1965	
India	Himachal Pradesh	6	2000–2007	
Nepal	Baitadi district, Mahakali zone	15	2010–2012	
Nepal	Pokhara Valley, Gandaki zone	12	1987–1989	
Pakistan	Ayubia National Park, Khyber Pakhtunkhwa	12	1989–2006	
Pakistan	Machiara National Park, Azad Kashmir	2	2004–2007	
Somalia	Golis Mountains, Togdheer	100	c. 1889	
South Africa	Kruger National Park	5	1992–2003	
Sri Lanka	Punanai, Batticaloa district	12	1923–1924	
Zambia	Chambezi River	67	1936–1937	
Zambia	Luangwa River	8	1938	
^{†} No comprehensive global database of fatal leopard attacks exists, and many countries do not keep official records. Due to the fragmentary nature of the data, the deaths reproduced here should be considered minimum figures only.^{‡} The territories forming British India (Bangladesh, Burma, India, and Pakistan)

== Man-eaters ==
=== Characteristics ===
The leopard is largely a nocturnal hunter. For its size, it is the most powerful large felid after the jaguar, able to drag a carcass larger than itself up a tree. Leopards can run more than 60 kilometres per hour (37 mph), leap more than 6 metres (20 ft) horizontally and 3 metres (9.8 ft) vertically, and have a more developed sense of smell than tigers. They are strong climbers and can descend down a tree headfirst. Man-eating leopards have earned a reputation as being particularly bold and difficult to track. British hunters Jim Corbett (1875–1955) and Kenneth Anderson (1910–1974) wrote that hunting leopards presented more challenges than any other animal. Indian naturalist J. C. Daniel (1927–2011), former curator of the Bombay Natural History Society, reprinted many early twentieth-century accounts of man-eating leopards in his book The Leopard in India: A Natural History (Dehradun: Natraj Publishers, 2009). One such account in the Journal of the Bombay Natural History Society describes the unique danger posed by leopards:

Like the tiger, the panther [leopard] sometimes takes to man-eating, and a man-eating panther is even more to be dreaded than a tiger with similar tastes, on account of its greater agility, and also its greater stealthiness and silence. It can stalk and jump, and...can climb better than a tiger, and it can also conceal itself in astonishingly meager cover, often displaying uncanny intelligence in this act. A man-eating panther frequently breaks through the frail walls of village huts and carries away children and even adults as they lie asleep.

One study concluded that only 9 of 152 documented man-eating leopards were female. Drawing on the sex and physical condition of 78 man-eating leopards, the same study concluded that man-eaters were typically uninjured mature males (79.5%), with a fewer number of aged and immature males (11.6% and 3.8%, respectively). Once a leopard has killed and eaten a human, they are likely to persist as man-eaters—they may even show a nearly exclusive preference for humans. In "Man-Eaters of Kumaon", Jim Corbett mentioned that leopards are driven to man-eating by acquiring a taste for human flesh due to scavenging on corpses thrown into the jungle during an epidemic and also due to humans being an easier catch than other species they prey upon. He wrote,"A leopard, in an area in which his natural food is scarce, finding these bodies very soon acquires a taste for human flesh, and when the disease dies down and normal conditions are established, he very naturally, on finding his food supply cut off, takes to killing human beings". Of the two man-eating leopards of Kumaon, which between them killed 525 people, the Panar Leopard followed on the heels of a very severe outbreak of cholera, while the Rudraprayag Leopard followed the 1918 influenza epidemic which was particularly deadly in India. Corbett wrote that the Rudraprayag man-eater once broke into a pen holding 40 goats, but instead of attacking the livestock it killed and ate the sleeping 14-year-old boy who had been assigned to guard them.

Leopard attacks on humans tend to occur at night, and often close to villages. There have been documented incidents of leopards forcing their way into human dwellings at night and attacking the inhabitants in their sleep. A number of fatal attacks have also occurred in zoos and homes with pet leopards. During predatory attacks, leopards typically bite their prey's throat or the nape of the neck, lacerating or severing jugular veins and carotid arteries, causing rapid exsanguination. The spine may be crushed and the skull perforated, exposing the brain. Survivors of attacks typically suffer extensive trauma to the head, neck, and face. Multibacterial infection resulting from the contamination of wounds by leopard oral flora occurs in 5–30% of attack survivors, complicating recovery. Before the advent of antibiotics, 75% of attack survivors died from infection.

=== Notable man-eaters ===
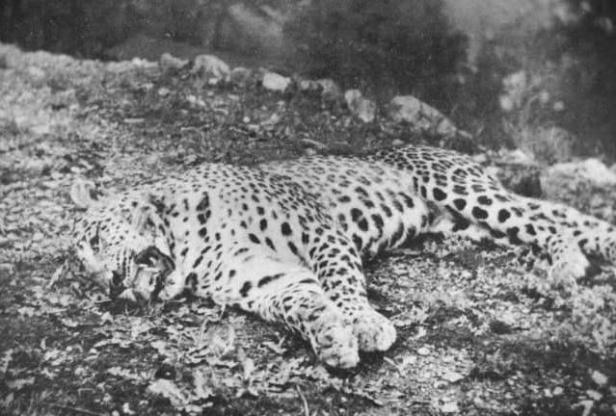
The Panar Leopard killed by Jim Corbett

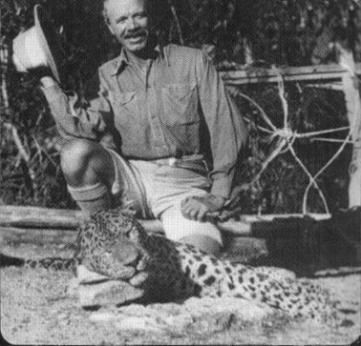
British hunter Jim Corbett poses after shooting the Rudraprayag leopard on 2 May 1926

- Leopard of Panar: A male leopard reported to have killed at least 400 people in the Panar region of the Almora district - situated in Kumaon, Northern India - during the early 20th century. Jim Corbett heard of the leopard while hunting the Champawat tiger in 1907, and in 1910 he set out to kill it. Although it apparently claimed significantly more lives than the Rudraprayag man-eater, the Panar man-eater received less attention from the British Indian press, which Corbett attributed to the remoteness of Almora.
- Leopard of the Central Provinces
- Leopard of Rudraprayag
- Leopard of Gummalapur: Active in the area around Gumlapur in the Jagtial district of Telangana. Was reported to have killed around 42 people, and to have displayed a "veritable cunning that almost exceeded human intelligence." According to hunter Kenneth Anderson, the man who eventually shot the leopard, it went so far as to break into village huts, and, on one occasion, had killed an entire family after finding itself trapped and unable to carry its victim out.
- Leopard of the Yellagiri Hills - Active around the village of Yellagiri in the Yadadri Bhuvanagiri district of Telangana. This leopard started out preying on cattle and goats, but moved on to people after being shot by a forester. While it reportedly only claimed three victims, the leopard proved elusive, requiring three separate hunts before being shot by Kenneth Anderson.
- Leopard of the Golis Range: In 1899, British officer H. G. C. Swayne (1860–1940) wrote of a man-eating leopard that had allegedly killed more than 100 people in the Golis Mountains of British Somaliland. Swayne's brief account appears in the volume Great and Small Game of Africa (London: Roland Ward, 1899), edited by the prominent British naturalist Henry Bryden (1854–1937):
  In 1889 there was a leopard, said to be a panther, which had haunted the Mirso ledge of the Golis range for some years, and was supposed to have killed over a hundred people. It was in the habit of lying in wait at a corner of a very dark, rough jungle path, where huge rocks overlooked the track; and the Somalis used to show a boulder, some 6 feet high, a yard from the path, in the flat top of which was a depression shaped like a panther's body, from which the beast was said to spring upon travellers.
  According to Swayne, leopards were more abundant in the Golis Mountains than anywhere else in British Somaliland, and were responsible for 90% of all attacks on sheep and goats. The rocky terrain of the Golis made tracking and killing leopards next to impossible. At the time of the attacks, this remote territory remained largely unexplored by the British, and little else is known of the Golis Range man-eater.
- Leopard of the Mulher Valley: In 1903 L. S. Osmaston (1870–1969), a conservator employed by the Imperial Forestry Service, reported that a man-eating leopard had killed more than 30 people in the Mulher Valley between 1901 and 1902. Osmaston twice set out to kill the leopard in February and March 1902, but was unsuccessful. His forestry work required him to leave Mulher later that month, and he was unable to return until late November. The leopard's last attack occurred a few days later on 3 December:
  I heard a boy of 15 had been killed at Wadai, 4 miles [6 km] from my camp; this boy was most unfortunate. Last year the panther had tried to get him, but only mauled one leg; my wife and I were able to dose the wound with carbolic oil and the boy got well; this time he and one or two others were sitting close to a bright fire on a threshing floor near the village in the early part of the night and the panther came and carried him off: the panther took him about a quarter of a mile [400 m] to a patch of high grass and brushwood and ate all he could of the head, the flesh of one leg and all his inside; so there was plenty left for the beast to come back for.
  Osmaston constructed a blind 11 metres (36 ft) from the boy's corpse and waited. The leopard returned to the area in the afternoon, but cautiously avoided approaching the body until after dark. When it finally ventured within shooting range, Osmaston fired with his double-barreled express rifle. The injured animal darted off into the night, and was killed the following morning when it was discovered alive some distance away. Osmaston speculated that the attacks began during the Indian famine of 1899–1900, the leopard having taken to man-eating after killing a dying person in the jungle. He also believed the man-eater was responsible for other fatal attacks in the nearby Dang and Dhule districts, but did not know the exact number of fatalities.
- Leopard of Kahani: Robert A. Sterndale (1839–1902) and James Forsyth (1838–1871) gave accounts of a man-eating leopard that killed "nearly a hundred persons" in the Seoni district between 1857 and 1860. When Sterndale received word of the attacks he pursued the man-eater with his brother-in-law, W. Brooke Thomson, but their efforts proved fruitless. The breakout of the Indian Rebellion of 1857 sent Sterndale away for two years and ended his chance to capture the man-eater. The leopard evaded all attempts by locals to kill it and terrorized the villages of Dhuma and Kahani, sometimes killing three humans in a single night. According to Sterndale, the leopard preferred to consume blood rather than flesh, and most bodies showed few injuries other than telltale bite marks to the throat. A large reward was offered for the leopard's capture, and it was then unexpectedly killed one night by an inexperienced native hunter. When Forsyth passed through Seoni several years later, the leopard's story had become legendary. He later recounted a myth he had heard from the locals:
  A man and his wife were travelling back to their home from a pilgrimage to Benares, when they met on the road a panther. The woman was terrified; but the man said, "Fear not, I possess a charm by which I can transform myself into any shape. I will now become a panther, and remove this obstacle from the road, and on my return you must place this powder in my mouth, when I will recover my proper shape." He then swallowed his own portion of the magic powder, and assuming the likeness of the panther, persuaded him to leave the path. Returning to the woman, he opened his mouth to receive the transposing charm; but she, terrified by his dreadful appearance and open jaws, dropped it in the mire, and it was lost. Then, in despair, he killed the author of his misfortune, and ever after revenged himself on the race whose form he could never resume.
- Leopard of Punanai: The leopard called "man-eater of Punanai" is the only officially accounted for man-eating leopard of Sri Lanka, where leopard attacks rarely happen. It killed at least 12 people on a jungle road near the hamlet of Punanai, not far from Batticaloa in the east of Sri Lanka. Its first victim was a child. Roper Shelton Agar, the hunter who killed it in August 1924, made a detailed record of the leopard and his killing of it. Agar relates that the man-eater was very bold and stealthy:

"attacking even gangs of three or four people and carts. The beast never appears on the road, but stalks them through the jungle and at a suitable opportunity springs out upon one of the unfortunate stragglers."

After a failed attempt the previous day, Agar was successful in killing it when waiting for it in a tree hut that he got made near the corpse of a man that had been killed by the leopard, knowing that it would return to eat the remainder of the corpse:

"It was about 3 p.m. after a heavy shower, that the leopard came out. ... "licking" his chops, looking at his kill a few yards away, and looking at me. ... My 4790 was ready on my lap, the safety catch slipped up. I knew at that range I could place the bullet where I liked, and I chose the neck shot, as I knew at that angle the explosive bullet would rake the creature's vital organs. At the shot the leopard rolled over-stone-dead-never to do any more dirty work. ... At the sound of the shot, all my people and others who had collected round my car to wait for the result came running back. ... I wished to get out of the cursed place with its ugly sights as soon as possible. Corpse smells were suffocating me. ... The man-eater was not a very large leopard. ... He stood high off the ground, was in fine condition, and showed abnormal development for its size in respect of pads, neck muscles and head. The canine teeth were very long. He had a great number of knife wounds, old and new, showing that some of his victims had fought for their lives. ... I heard that his first victim was a young Moor boy, and that may possibly have been the beginning of his notorious career."

The leopard was stuffed and is now in the National Museum of Sri Lanka in Colombo. The leopard features in one of the books of Michael Ondaatje: The Man-eater of Punanai — a Journey of Discovery to the Jungles of Old Ceylon (1992).

== Recent attacks ==
=== In the wild ===
- On January 6, 2015, an Indian leopard injured a boy in Katarniaghat Wildlife Sanctuary, Uttar Pradesh. Another leopard killed 2 men in Kolar district, Karnataka. On January 13, 2015, a leopard injured a woman's neck with its paw in Jiuni Valley of Mandi district, while she had gone to collect fodder for household animals. On January 16, 2015, 2 boys were killed by a leopard in Uttarakhand. On January 25, 2015, a leopard killed a girl in Galyat, Pakistan. This was one of a number of attacks that were reported in the area for over a year and a half. The next day, a leopard mauled 5 people, seriously injuring 3, before being killed in Jalpaiguri district.
- On February 14, 2015, a leopard injured 2 villagers in Sagar district. Four days later, a leopard injured 6 people in Shravasti district. On February 22, 2015, a girl was injured on the head when a leopard attacked her in Dingore village (approximately 20 km (12 miles) from Junnar). On March 5, 2015, a leopardess critically injured 4 people before being stabbed to death in a forest of Jorhat district.
- On the night of Friday the 4th of May, 2018, a leopard killed and ate a 3-year-old boy in an unfenced part of a safari lodge in Queen Elizabeth National Park, Uganda. The toddler, whose mother was a ranger at the park, had been following a nanny outdoors without the latter's knowledge when he was attacked.
- In June 2019, a leopard attacked and killed the 2-year-old son of an employee in Kruger National Park, after the animal managed to access staff living quarters. The leopard was put down, also because it had shown signs of losing its fear from humans.
- In July 2024, a leopard attacked two men at Air Force Base Hoedspruit of the South African air force, very near Kruger National Park. Both men survived without major injuries. The leopard was trapped and relocated 100 km away.
- In 26th March 2026, a leopard killed a 43 years old monk in a cave at the Bambaragasthalawa Aranya Senasana in the Kumana National Park, Sri Lanka.

=== In captivity ===
- On February 21, 1914, a leopard escaped from Melbourne Zoo into a garden, where it attacked a 17-year-old girl. It was shot dead by a neighbour.
- On April 28, 1997, a 52-year-old woman was attacked and killed in a fenced run by a Persian leopard at an exotic animal farm in Oklahoma County. The animal was killed by two deputies after trying to escape.
- In early January 2003, an injured female leopard at Johannesburg Zoo mauled the vet Matt Hartley when he entered her enclosure. He sustained minor wounds on his right shoulder.
- On November 16, 2005, a 9-year-old boy was mauled by a 13-year-old Persian leopard while visiting Melbourne Zoo with his school. After running away and putting his arms on the wire in front of the cage, he was scratched on his arm.
- On November 13, 2006, a 23-year-old zookeeper at Chemnitz Zoo was attacked and killed by a female Persian leopard after leaving a cage door open. In September 2017, the same animal attacked a 56-year-old zookeeper and bit him in the face.
- In December 2007, a 5-year-old girl was severely injured by a leopard at the National Zoo of Malaysia. After crossing a barrier to the enclosure, the animal grabbed her by the collar of her dress and scratched her back, neck and mouth. The girl was hospitalised and, according to her parents, needed plastic surgery.
- On May 6, 2011, a 7-year-old boy was attacked by an Amur leopard at Sedgwick County Zoo after getting to close to its cage. He was treated in hospital.
- On August 31, 2020, 50-year-old Dwight Turner was mauled by a black leopard after paying its owner for a "full-contact experience" involving playing, rubbing its belly and taking photos.
- In August 2021, 36-year-old model Jessica Leidolph was attacked by a leopard and bitten in the head and face during a photo shoot at a retirement home for show animals in Nebra (Unstrut), Saxony-Anhalt, Germany. Her injuries were treated in hospital. The 48-year-old owner of the leopard was being investigated on suspicion of negligent bodily harm
- One June 6, 2022, a leopard injured a zookeeper's arm at the zoo of Córdoba, Spain while he was carrying out food.
- In August 2024, a leopard killed its 63-year-old owner in a private zoo in Jasenie, Slovakia.
- In December 2024, an employee at Odesa Zoo was attacked by a leopard in its enclosure. Because another person went into the enclosure to help the victim, the police neutralized the animal. The employee was treated in hospital, the other person was not harmed.
- On April 15, 2025, a zookeeper at National Zoological Park Delhi was mauled by a leopard called Bunty, sustaining injuries on his chest and back. Although he had been working for the zoo for over 25 years, the zookeeper only had experience with herbivores.
- On August 1, 2025, 26-year-old zookeeper Uriel Nuri was attacked during a behind-the-scenes tour at Jerusalem Biblical Zoo by a Persian leopard that had exited its exclosure. The victim succumbed to his injuries in Hadassah Medical Center.
- On August 15, 2025, a leopard attacked a 12 or 13-year-old boy called Suras in the Safari section of Bannerghatta Biological Park. The animal leaped after the safari vehicle and scratched the boy through an open window. After injuring his hand, the boy was treated in a hospital.
- On October 24, 2026, a 40-year-old zookeeper at Safaripark Beekse Bergen was mauled by one or two Persian leopards. She was able to alert her colleagues and was taken to a hospital in a helicopter, where she died of her injuries three days later.

== In fiction ==
In the 1942 film Cat People and its 1982 remake, a woman transforms into a monstrous black panther when aroused, which can only be reverted by killing a human.

In the Disney adaptation of Edgar Rice Burroughs' Tarzan novels, a female leopard called Sabor kills Tarzan's parents, which leads to young Tarzan being adopted by gorillas.

Several people are attacked and killed by mutated leopards in the season 1 episode "Eats, Shoots and Leaves" of the CBS television series Zoo.

== See also ==
- Chinese leopard
- Human–wildlife conflict
- Tiger attack
- Anthrozoology
- List of large carnivores known to prey on humans
