= Rushby =

Rushby is a surname. Notable people with the surname include:

- John Rushby (born 1949), British computer scientist
- Tom Rushby (1880–1962), English cricketer
- George Gilman Rushby (1900–1968), English hunter
- William Rushby (1888–1981), English footballer
