= Wolves of Turku =

1880/81 man-eating wolves in Finland

The Wolves of Turku were a trio of man-eating wolves which in 1880 and 1881 killed 22 children in Turku, Finland. The average age of the victims of these wolves was 5.9 years. Their depredations caused such concern that the local and national government became involved, seeking help from Russian and Lithuanian hunters, as well as the army. The wolves killed their last victim on 18 November 1881. On 12 January 1882, an old female wolf was shot and twelve days later, an adult male was poisoned, putting an end to the attacks. One of the dead wolves was sent to the hunting museum of Riihimäki, the other to the St Olof's school where they can still be seen today. The third wolf ended up as a doormat and disappeared.

In recent times, some Finnish conservationists, notably Pousette (2000), have debated the accuracy of the depicted events. Although he stated that there was no direct evidence that the wolves were previously captive animals as the wolf of Gysinge had been, he indicated that the possibility could not be ruled out. He also stated that the female had poor teeth. Erkki Pulliainen, the leading wolf specialist of the Wolf Specialist Group of the IUCN stated that the historical information was very unreliable, and told the newspaper Demari on 27 October 2005, that one Turku wolf was really a wolf-dog hybrid. Eirik Granqvist wrote an article in the leading daily Helsingin Sanomat confirming that they had been positively identified as wolves after their remains had been examined in both the hunting museum and St Olof's school.
