= George Gilman (disambiguation) =

George Gilman (1826–1901) was an American businessman, founder of the A&P.

George Gilman may also refer to:

- George Gilman (Oregon politician), American politician in Oregon's State House of Representatives
- George G. Gilman, pseudonym of British author Terry Harknett

== See also ==
- George Gilman Fogg (1813–1881), United States senator and diplomat from New Hampshire
- George Gilman Rushby (1900–1968), elephant hunter
