= Leopard of the Central Provinces =

Individual Indian leopard

The Leopard of the Central Provinces, also known as the Devilish Cunning Panther, was a man-eating male Indian leopard which over the course of a couple of years, killed over 150 people, all women and children, in the Central Provinces of British India in the early 20th century. The leopard reportedly claimed a victim once every 2–3 days, each time in a different area to the last, with the killings sometimes taking place 48 to 62 kilometres (30 to 39 mi) apart. The leopard caused such panic that the native communities in its range rarely left their homes alone or unarmed.

== Hunt for the leopard ==
An unnamed British hunter set up headquarters in a large village, where he compiled information on the leopard's depredations with the local thana. Ten days later, a man entered the hunter's camp one morning, and claimed that the leopard had entered a hut in a village a mile from the camp, and had unsuccessfully attempted to carry off a small girl the previous night. The hunter dressed the girl's wounds and she recovered. The leopard struck again two days later in another village. The hunter searched for the leopard from his camp for three weeks without success.

With the body count rising, the hunter considered moving camp, until a boy from a village four miles away came to him, and stated that the leopard had dragged off his brother when they were driving cattle. At 14:00, the hunter set himself on a tree overlooking the boy's corpse, in the hope that the leopard would return for it. The leopard came at night, though the hunter was unable to get a clear shot due to the darkness, and the canopy of dense creeper vine. The hunter attempted to startle the leopard into coming out for a clear shot, but all attempts failed to intimidate the leopard, even firing in the air had no effect. The shots got the attention of the villagers, but the hunter called at them to clear the area. After a few hours, the hunter fell asleep at 1:00, and upon waking, found the leopard clawing at the foot of the tree. The leopard left after a few moments, but returned three hours later to finish its meal. By sunrise, all that remained of the boy's body were hands, feet and a few bones. The hunter attempted to track down the leopard in case it was still in the area, but after a search spanning one mile, he gave up. A few days later, the hunter moved camp ten miles away, hoping for more success. On the second night of his arrival, the hunter was awoken from his sleep by the leopard scratching outside his tent, though it was driven off by the shouting of the villagers.

== Death and post mortem ==
Three days later, the leopard attacked the goats of a Gond farmer, but was driven off. Upon shortly returning however, it was fatally shot with a projectile propelled from a gas pipe five yards away from it. The Gond presented the hunter with the leopard's skin and stomach contents, among which was a ball of human hair, thus confirming it as the man-eater. The hunter purchased the hide for 10 rupees, later noting that the fur and claws were in fine condition, not what was to be expected from an old, infirm animal. There were no signs of past injuries which could have prevented it from hunting, thus leaving the hunter to conclude that the leopard had probably been fed human flesh as a cub by its mother, a likely man-eater herself.

== See also ==
- Leopard attack
