= Leopard of Rudraprayag =

Leopard known to eat humans

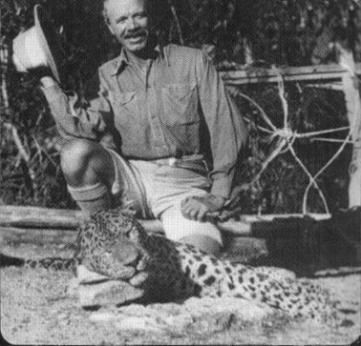
Leopard of Rudraprayag after being shot by Jim Corbett in 1926

The Leopard of Rudraprayag was a male man-eating leopard that measured about 2.28 m (7 ft 5 in) long, reputed to have killed over 125 people. It was eventually killed by hunter and author Jim Corbett using a .275 Rigby rifle now owned by the gunmaker.

== Attacks ==
The first victim of the leopard was from Benji Village, and was killed in 1918. For the next eight years, people were afraid to venture alone at night on the road to the Hindu holy shrines of Kedarnath and Badrinath, for it passed through the leopard's territory, and few villagers left their houses after dark. The leopard, preferring human flesh, would break down doors, leap through windows, claw through the mud or thatch walls of huts and drag the occupants out before devouring them. According to official records, the leopard killed over 125 people. However, Corbett notes that the number of deaths was probably higher as a result of unreported kills and deaths due to injuries sustained in attacks.

== Hunt for the leopard ==
Units of Gurkha soldiers and British soldiers were sent to track it, but failed. Attempts to kill the leopard with high powered gin traps and poison also failed. Several well-known hunters tried to capture the leopard and the British government offered financial rewards. All of this, however, ended in failure. In the autumn of 1925, Jim Corbett took it upon himself to try to kill the leopard and, after a ten-week hunt, he successfully did so on 2 May 1926.

== Reasons for becoming a man-eater ==
Corbett's notes revealed that this leopard, a large elderly male, was in fine condition except for a few healed injuries caused by hunters after it had become a man-eater. The leopard had started hunting people eight years earlier, when it was still young; therefore it was not old age that caused it to turn to hunting people. Corbett wrote that, in his opinion, human bodies left unburied during disease epidemics were the main reason for the Rudraprayag and Panar leopards to become man-eaters.

At the end of the introduction of his book Man-Eaters of Kumaon, Corbett wrote:

A leopard, in an area in which his natural food is scarce, finding these bodies very soon acquires a taste for human flesh, and when the disease dies down and normal conditions are established, he very naturally, on finding his food supply cut off, takes to killing human beings. Of the two man-eating leopards of Kumaon, which between them killed over five hundred and twenty-five human beings, one followed on the heels of a very severe outbreak of cholera, while the other followed the mysterious disease which swept through India in 1918 and was called war fever.

== Aftermath ==
In Rudraprayag, there is a sign-board which marks the spot where the leopard was shot. There is a fair held at Rudraprayag commemorating the killing of the leopard.

The leopard was the subject of a 2005 BBC Two TV Series Manhunters, in the episode The Man-Eating Leopard of Rudraprayag, which presents an entirely fictionalized representation of Jim Corbett's hunt.
