= Manhunters (TV series) =

- Genre: Drama
- Starring: Jason Flemyng
- Country of origin: United Kingdom
- No. of series: 1
- No. of episodes: 3

Production
- Running time: 50 min

Original release
- Network: BBC Two
- Release: 2 December – 16 December 2005

Manhunters is a three-part TV drama series that aired on BBC Two in the United Kingdom in 2005. It tells the story of three cases of man-eaters through the memoirs of those who hunt them and, in the case of the third episode, accidentally unleash them on their community. The first tells the story of Jim Corbett (played by Jason Flemyng) and the Man-Eating Leopard of Rudraprayag. The second tells the story of George Rushby and the Lions of Njombe, and the third tells the story of the Wolf of Gysinge.

== Reception ==
The Guardian television critic Sam Wollaston called the series "done very nicely" with "a half-decent script" and "reasonable actors" but found the show to be similar to Channel 5's shows. The newspaper's Nicole Mowbray of The Guardian had a similar view, calling Manhunters "basically an historical version" of When Animals Attack!. She said, "Once you've seen one man-eating beastie stalking a remote African village, you've seen them all." David Stubbs of The Guardian found that "the magnificent photography of this drama" renders it "thoroughly agreeable" to watch a story portraying wolves eating kids who are five years old.

The Glasgow Times reviewer Marianne Taylor penned a mixed review of the episode "The Man-Eating Leopard of Rudraprayag". She wrote, "The action is sometimes slow-burning, as the tension grows, but when the big cat finally reveals itself, there are moments of sheer terror." The Observer's Mick Bradley praised the episode "The Man-Eating Wolves of Gysinge" for being "a well conceived drama which proves that, as usual, man is to blame for corrupting nature".
