= Man-eating animal =

Creature that preys on humans

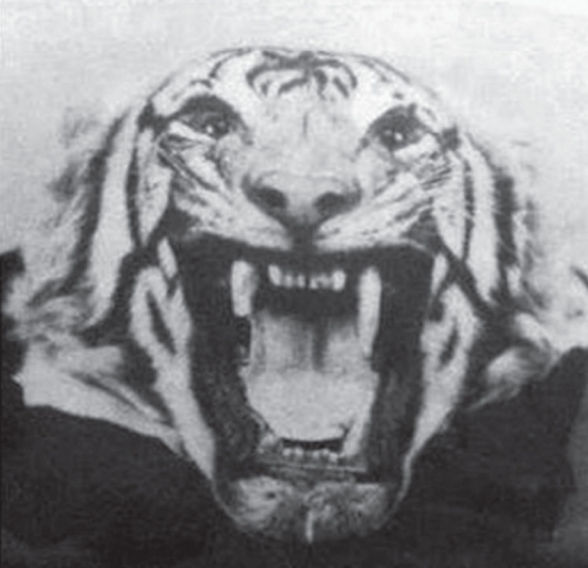
Head of the Champawat tiger, which killed over 430 people in Nepal and India, before being shot by Jim Corbett in 1907. Because of her broken upper and lower right canines, she was not able to hunt her natural prey, and started feeding on humans.

A man-eating animal or man-eater is an individual animal or being that preys on humans as a pattern of hunting behavior. This does not include the scavenging of corpses, a single attack born of opportunity or desperate hunger, or the incidental eating of a human that the animal has killed in self-defense.

Although humans can be attacked by many kinds of non-human animals, man-eating animals are those that have incorporated human flesh into their usual diet and actively hunt and kill humans. Most reported cases of man-eaters have involved lions, tigers, leopards, polar bears, and large crocodilians.

== Felids ==
=== Tigers ===
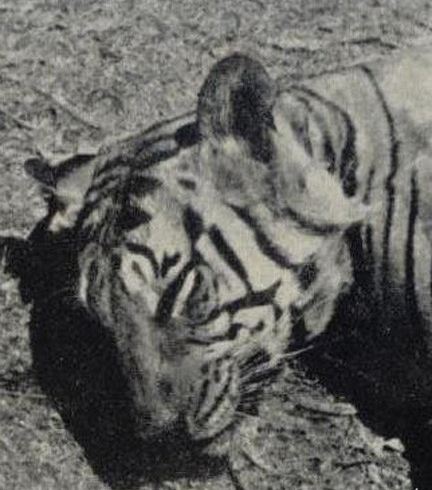
The man-eater of Segur, a young man-eating male Bengal tiger who killed 5 people in the Nilgiri Hills of Tamil Nadu state in South India.

Tigers are recorded to have killed more people than any other big cat, and have been responsible for more human deaths through direct attack than any other wild mammal. About 1,000 people were reportedly killed each year in India during the early 1900s, with one individual Bengal tigress killing 436 people in India and Nepal. Tigers killed 129 people in the Sundarbans mangrove forest from 1969 to 1971. Unlike leopards and lions, man-eating tigers rarely enter human habitations to acquire prey. The majority of victims were reportedly in the tiger's territory when the attack took place. Additionally, tiger attacks mostly occur during daylight hours, unlike those involving leopards and lions. The Sundarbans is home to approximately 600 royal Bengal tigers who before modern times used to "regularly kill 50 or 60 people a year". In 2008, a loss of habitat due to Cyclone Sidr led to an increase in the number of attacks on humans in the Indian side of the Sundarbans, as tigers were crossing over to the Indian side from Bangladesh.

A theory promoted to explain this increase in attacks suggests that, since tigers drink fresh water, the salinity of the area waters serve as a destabilizing factor in the diet and life of tigers of Sundarbans, keeping them in constant discomfort and making them extremely aggressive. Other theories include the sharing of their habitat with humans and the consumption of human corpses during floods.

=== Lions ===
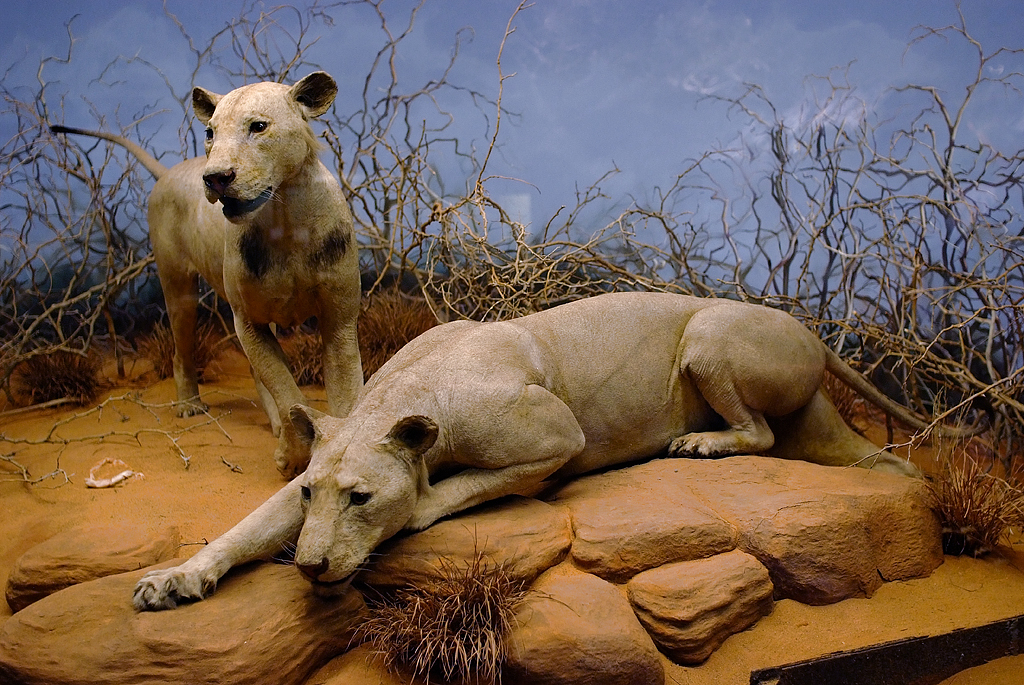
The Tsavo maneaters on display in the Field Museum of Natural History in Chicago.

Man-eating lions have been recorded to actively enter human villages at night as well as during the day to acquire prey. This greater assertiveness usually makes man-eating lions easier to dispatch than tigers. Lions typically become man-eaters for the same reasons as tigers: starvation, old age, and illness, though as with tigers, some man-eaters were reportedly in perfect health.

The most notorious case of man-eating lions ever documented happened in 1898 in what was then known as British East Africa, now Kenya. During the construction of a rail bridge over the Tsavo River (part of the Uganda Railway) in modern-day Tsavo East National Park, two enormous maneless male Tsavo lions terrorized the railway workers, most of them imported from India, and were believed to have killed or devoured over 130 men. The entire railway project had to be halted as the then British prime minister sounded the alarm. They were eventually tracked and killed by the project's chief engineer and required eight men to carry each to camp.

Man-eating lions studies indicate that African lions eat humans as a supplement to other food, not as a last resort. In July 2018, a South African news website reported that three rhino poachers were mauled and eaten by lions at Sibuya Game Reserve in Eastern Cape province, South Africa.

=== Leopards ===
Man-eating leopards are a small percentage of all leopards, but have undeniably been a menace in some areas; one leopard in India killed over 200 people. Jim Corbett was noted to have stated that unlike tigers, which usually became man-eaters because of infirmity, leopards more commonly did so after scavenging on human corpses. In the area that Corbett knew well, dead people are usually cremated completely, but when there is a bad disease epidemic, the death rate outruns the supply of cremation pyre wood and people burn the body a little and throw it over the edge of the burning ghat. In Asia, man-eating leopards usually attack at night, and have been reported to break down doors and thatched roofs in order to reach humans. Attacks in Africa are reported less often, though there have been occasions where attacks occurred in daylight. In 2019 in India, an infant was stolen and decapitated by a leopard.

=== Jaguars ===
Jaguar attacks on humans are rare nowadays. In the past, they were more frequent, at least after the arrival of Conquistadors in the Americas. The risk to humans would likely increase if the number of capybaras, the jaguar's primary prey, decreased. However, occasional attacks still occur; for example, in April 2025, a man was killed by a jaguar while collecting honey in a rural area of the Brazilian Pantanal, near Aquidauana in the state of Mato Grosso do Sul.

=== Cougars ===
Due to the expanding human population, cougar ranges increasingly overlap with areas inhabited by humans. Attacks on humans are very rare, as cougar prey recognition is a learned behavior and they do not generally recognize humans as prey. Attacks on people, livestock, and pets may occur when a puma habituates to humans or is in a condition of severe starvation. Attacks are most frequent during late spring and summer, when juvenile cougars leave their mothers and search for new territory. Unlike other big cat man-eaters, cougars do not kill humans as a result of old age or food preference, but in defense of their territory. Such behavior has been documented in hunts by humans, where the cougar is flushed out by dogs which it either outruns or mauls some distance away. Then, the cougar circles around and mauls the hunter in ambush attack.

== Canids ==
=== Wolves ===
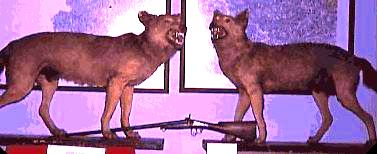
Two of the Wolves of Périgord, a pack allegedly responsible for the deaths of 18 people in February 1766, on display at the chateau of Razac in Thiviers

Contrasted to other carnivorous mammals known to attack humans for food, the frequency with which wolves have been recorded to kill people is rather low, indicating that, though potentially dangerous, wolves are among the least threatening for their size and predatory potential, except for the dog which poses lethal hazards for reasons other than predation. In the rare cases in which man-eating wolf attacks occur, the majority of victims are children. Habituation is a known factor contributing to some man-eating wolf attacks which results from living close to human habitations, causing wolves to lose their fear of humans and consequently approach too closely, much like urban coyotes. Habituation can also happen when people intentionally encourage wolves to approach them, usually by offering them food, or unintentionally, when people do not sufficiently intimidate them. This is corroborated by accounts demonstrating that wolves in protected areas are more likely to show boldness toward humans than ones in areas where they are actively hunted.

=== Dingoes ===
Attacks on humans by dingoes are rare, with only two recorded fatalities in Australia. Dingoes are normally shy of humans and avoid encounters with them. The most famous record of a dingo attack was the 1980 disappearance of nine-week-old Azaria Chamberlain. Her parents reported that they both saw a dingo taking Azaria out of their tent when she and her family were out on a camping trip to Uluru. In 2019, a father saved his 14-month-old child from a dingo which had dragged him away.

=== Domestic dogs ===
Although dogs have many of the characteristics of bears and big cats, they are unlikely to act as man-eaters themselves. More often humans can be bitten to death by packs of stray dogs, but not eaten. Such attacks often occur in the countries of Eastern Europe, post-Soviet states, and some South Asian countries, such as India.

=== Coyotes ===
Almost all known predatory coyote attacks on humans have failed. To date, other than the Kelly Keen coyote attack and the Taylor Mitchell coyote attack, all known victims have survived by fighting, fleeing, or being rescued, and only in the latter case was the victim partially eaten, although that case occurred in Nova Scotia where the local animals are eastern coyotes (coywolves).

=== Jackals ===
In June 2019, a nine-year-old boy was killed by jackals in Farakka, West Bengal, India. This was witnessed by a neighbor, who saw the child's half-eaten body being dragged by the pack of seven jackals.

== Bears ==
=== Polar bears ===
Polar bears, particularly young and undernourished ones, will hunt people for food. Although bears rarely attack humans, bear attacks often cause devastating injuries due to the size and immense strength of the giant land and shoreline carnivores. As with dogs, predatory intent is not necessary; territorial disputes and protection of cubs can result in death by bear attack. Truly man-eating bear attacks are uncommon, but are known to occur when the animals are diseased or natural prey is scarce, often leading them to attack and eat anything they are able to kill.

=== Brown bears ===
Brown bears are known to sometimes hunt hikers and campers for food in North America. For example, Lance Crosby, 63, of Billings, Montana, was hiking alone and without bear spray in Yellowstone National Park in August 2015 when he was attacked by a 259-pound (117 kg) grizzly bear. The park rules say people should hike in groups and always carry bear spray – a form of pepper spray that is used to deter aggressive bears. His body was found in the Lake Village section of the park in northwest Wyoming. Timothy Treadwell and his girlfriend Amie Huguenard were killed and almost fully eaten by a 28-year-old brown bear on October 5, 2003. The bear's stomach was later found to contain human remains and clothing. In July 2008, dozens of starving brown bears killed two geologists working at a salmon hatchery in Kamchatka. After the partially eaten remains of the two workers were discovered, authorities responded by dispatching hunters to cull or disperse the bears.

=== American black bears ===
While American black bears rarely attack people, lone, predatory black bears are responsible for most fatal black bear attacks on humans in the United States and Canada, according to a study from 2011. Unlike female bears, motivated to attack humans to protect cubs, male black bears may display predatory behavior toward humans and view them as a potential food source. The same study cautioned that the chances of a black bear attacking a human were small, writing, "Each year, millions of interactions between people and black bears occur without any injury to a person, although by 2 years of age most black bears have the physical capacity to kill a person."

=== Other bear species ===
Though usually shy and cautious animals, Asian black bears are more aggressive toward humans than the brown bears of Eurasia. In some areas of India and Burma, sloth bears are more feared than tigers, due to their unpredictable temperament.

== Other mammals ==
=== Hyenas ===
Although hyenas readily feed upon human corpses, they are generally very wary of humans and less dangerous than the big cats whose territory overlaps with theirs. Nonetheless, both the spotted hyena and the smaller striped hyena are powerful predators quite capable of killing an adult human, and are known to attack people when food is scarce. Like most predators, hyena attacks tend to target women, children, and infirm men, though both species can and do attack healthy adult males on occasion. The spotted hyena is the more dangerous of the two species, being larger, more predatory, and more aggressive than the striped hyena. The brown hyena and aardwolf are not known to prey on humans.

=== Pigs ===
Pigs are competent predators and can kill and eat helpless humans unable to escape them. Numerous animal trials in the Middle Ages involved pigs accused of eating children. In 2019, a woman was attacked and killed by a herd of feral hogs in rural Texas. She died due to exsanguination (i.e. bled to death) from bite wounds.

Wild pigs are opportunistic omnivores that can function as aggressive predators. Being scavengers, wild pigs have been specifically documented to feed on human corpses or remains in post-combat, rural accident (e.g., plane crash) and crime (e.g., homicide) situations. In addition, there is at least one instance on record of a wild pig in southern France that became a confirmed repeated man-eater. In four of the attacks reviewed in a study, the wild pig either partially or mostly consumed the remains of the human victim that had been fatally injured by that animal in the attack. Three of the four attacks were explicitly characterized by the investigating authorities as being predatory. In two additional attacks, the pig's motivation was also described by either the victim or the victim's companion as predatory; of those, one victim survived with serious injuries while the other was fatally injured. In a 2009 attack in India, a 3-year-old girl, walking on a trail with her father, was grabbed by a wild pig, which then tried to flee with the child in its mouth. The father chased the animal, fighting with it until his daughter was released. Both the father and daughter were seriously injured during the attack; the child later died of her injuries. Although attacks by wild pigs are primarily defensive in nature, the potential for an attack of a predatory nature cannot be completely discounted.

=== Primates ===
The only documented man-eating hominids (great apes) have been humans themselves and chimpanzees. As humans encroach further on chimpanzee habitat, the occurrence of chimpanzees killing human children has allegedly become more common.

=== Rats ===
Despite small individual size, rats in large numbers can kill helpless people by eating them alive.

Rat torture has been documented by Amnesty International. Large sized rats (some as big as a small cat) have been seen to feed upon human corpses in mortuaries in India.

== Reptiles ==
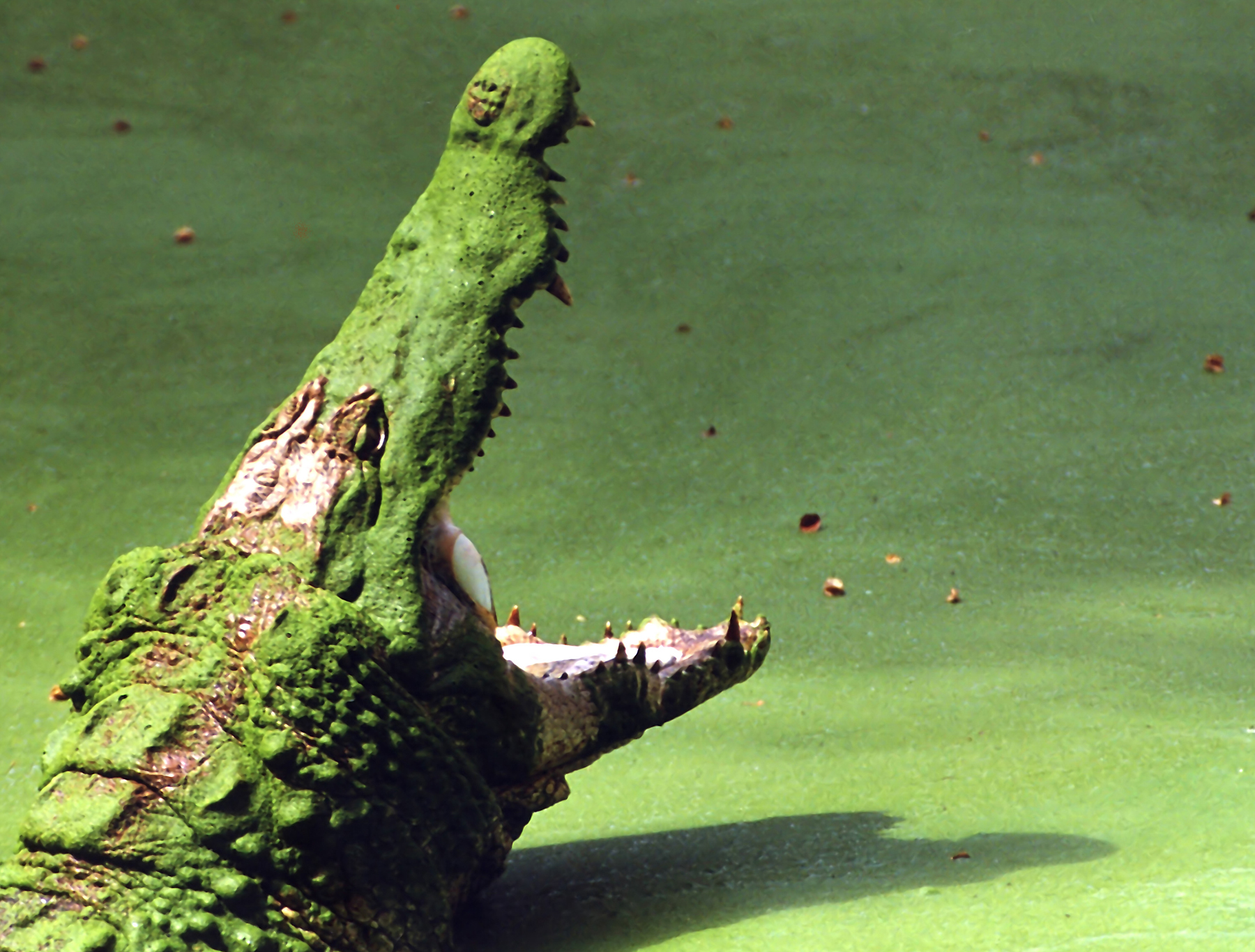
The Nile crocodile is one of the species involved in the most unprovoked fatal attacks on humans.

=== Crocodiles ===
Crocodile attacks on people are common in places where crocodiles are native. The saltwater and Nile crocodiles are responsible for more attacks and more deaths than any other wild predator that attacks humans for food. Each year, hundreds of deadly attacks are attributed to the Nile crocodile within sub-Saharan Africa. Because many relatively healthy populations of Nile crocodiles occur in East Africa, their proximity to people living in poverty and/or without infrastructure has made it likely that the Nile crocodile is responsible for more attacks on humans than all other species combined. One notorious man-eating crocodilian is Gustave. In Australia, crocodiles have also been responsible for several deaths in the tropical north of the country. Mugger crocodiles are another crocodile species that may see people as prey as they kill many people in Asia each year, although not to the same level as the saltwater and Nile crocodiles. All crocodile species are potentially dangerous to humans, but most do not actively prey on them.

=== Alligators ===
Despite their manifest ability to kill prey similar to or larger than humans in size and their commonness in an area of dense human settlement (the southeastern United States, especially Florida), American alligators rarely prey upon humans. Even so, there have been several notable instances of alligators opportunistically attacking humans, especially the careless, small children, and elderly. Unlike the far more dangerous saltwater and Nile crocodiles, the majority of alligators avoid contact with humans if possible, especially if they have been hunted. Incidents have happened, and they may not all have been predatory in nature.

=== Snakes ===
Very few species of snakes are physically capable of swallowing an adult human. Although quite a few claims have been made about giant snakes swallowing adult humans, only a limited number have been confirmed. Various species of pythons are the most commonly recorded perpetrators. In 2017 in Indonesia, an adult male was discovered inside a 7-metre-long (23 ft) python. On 14 June 2018 a 54-year-old woman named Wa Tiba was eaten by a reticulated python, which had slithered into her garden at her home. A 45-year-old woman farmer in Indonesia, who had been missing since the day before, was found dead inside a 5-metre-long (16 ft) python in June 2024.

Large constricting snakes will sometimes constrict and kill prey that are too large to swallow. Also, multiple cases are documented of medium-sized (3 to 4 m [10 to 13 ft]) captive Burmese pythons constricting and killing humans, including several nonintoxicated, healthy adult men, one of whom was a "student" zookeeper. In the zookeeper case, the python was attempting to swallow the zookeeper's head when other keepers intervened. In addition, at least one Burmese python as small as 2.7 m (8.9 ft) constricted and killed an intoxicated adult man.

A large constricting snake may constrict or swallow an infant or a small child, a threat that is legitimate and empirically proven. Cases of python attacks on children have been recorded for the reticulated python, the African rock python, and the Burmese python.

In the Philippines, more than a quarter of Aeta men (a modern forest-dwelling hunter-gatherer group) have reported surviving reticulated python predation attempts. Pythons are nonvenomous ambush predators, and both the Aeta and pythons hunt deer, wild pigs, and monkeys, making them competitors and prey.

In South Africa in 2002, a 10-year-old boy was swallowed whole by a 6-metre-long (20 ft) Southern African rock python, but cases like these are empirically observed and recorded but not entirely confirmed unlike the cases mentioned above.

In Australia there has been one recorded case of an Australian scrub python attempting to consume an adult human.

=== Lizards ===
Large Komodo dragons are the only known lizard species to occasionally attack and consume humans. Because they live on remote islands, attacks are infrequent and may go unreported. Despite their large size, attacks on people are often unsuccessful and the victims manage to escape with their lives, albeit severely wounded. Komodo dragons have been known to consume human corpses, usually by digging up shallow graves. This has led to the villagers of Komodo Island to relocate their graves, and pile rocks on top of them to deter the dragons.

== Birds ==
Some evidence supports the contention that the African crowned eagle occasionally views human children as prey, with a witness account of one attack (in which the victim, a seven-year-old boy, survived and the eagle was killed), and the discovery of part of a human child skull in a nest. This would make it the only living bird known to prey on humans, although other birds such as ostriches and cassowaries have killed humans in self-defense and a lammergeier might have killed the ancient Greek playwright Aeschylus by accident. Various large raptors like golden eagles are reported attacking humans, but it is unclear if they intend to eat them or if they have ever been successful in killing one.

A series of incidents in which a martial eagle attacked and killed one human child as well as injuring two others was recorded in Ethiopia in 2019.

Some fossil evidence indicates large birds of prey occasionally preyed on prehistoric hominids. The Taung Child, an Australopithecus africanus found in Africa, is believed to have been killed by an eagle-like bird similar to the crowned eagle. The extinct Haast's eagle may have preyed on humans in New Zealand, and this conclusion would be consistent with Māori folklore. Leptoptilos robustus might have preyed on both Homo floresiensis and anatomically modern humans, and the Malagasy crowned eagle, teratorns, Woodward's eagle and Caracara major are similar in size to the Haast's eagle, implying that they similarly could pose a threat to a human being.

== Fish ==
=== Sharks ===
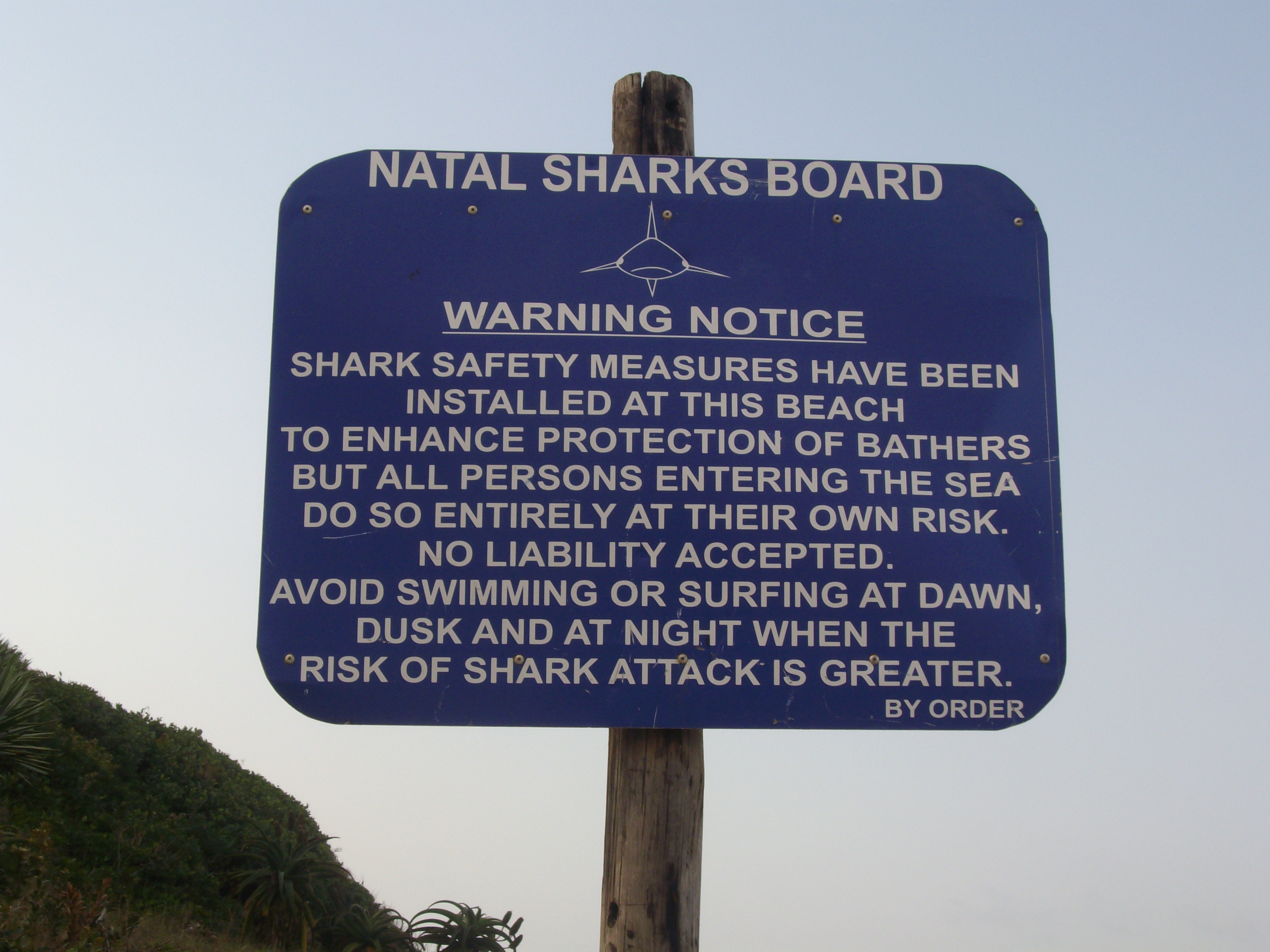
Sign warning swimmers of the danger of shark attacks

Contrary to popular belief, only a limited number of shark species are known to pose a serious threat to humans. The species that are most dangerous can be indiscriminate and will take any potential meal they happen to come across (as an oceanic whitetip shark might eat a person floating in the water after a shipwreck), or may bite out of curiosity or mistaken identity (as with a great white shark attacking a human on a surfboard possibly because it resembles its favoured prey, a seal).

Of more than 568 shark species, only four have been involved in a significant number of fatal unprovoked attacks on humans: the great white shark, tiger shark, bull shark, and the oceanic whitetip shark. These sharks, being large, powerful predators, may sometimes attack and kill humans; it is worth noting that they have all been filmed in open water by unprotected divers. One of the most notorious and well known incidents of shark predation came with the sinking of the USS Indianapolis (CA-35), where sharks believed to be oceanic whitetips fed on an estimated 150 of the survivors who were stranded for days.

More recently, on 8 June 2023, due to the popularity of social media the fatal tiger shark attack on Vladimir Popov off the coast of Hurghada, Egypt, in the Red Sea has also gained significant notoriety as almost the entire attack was caught on film before going viral.

=== Piranhas ===
Attacks by piranhas resulting in deaths have occurred in the Amazon basin. In 2011, a drunk 18-year-old boy was attacked and killed in Rosario del Yata, Bolivia. In 2012, a five-year-old Brazilian girl was attacked and killed by a shoal of red-bellied piranhas. Some Brazilian rivers have warning signs about lethal piranhas.

=== Catfish ===
Reports have been made of goonch catfish eating humans in the Kāli River in India. Additionally there have been reports of wels catfish killing and eating humans in Europe. Large predatory catfish such as the redtail catfish and piraíba are thought to have contributed to the loss of life when the Sobral Santos II ferry sank in the Amazon River in 1981.

=== Groupers ===
The giant grouper is one of the largest species of bony fish in the world, reaching a maximum length of 3 meters (10 ft) and weight of 600 kilograms (1,300 lb). There have been cases of this species attacking humans, along with the closely related Atlantic goliath grouper.

== Invertebrates ==
=== Cephalopods ===
Some large cephalopods, in particular the Humboldt squid, are said to attack and eat humans.

== Death tolls ==
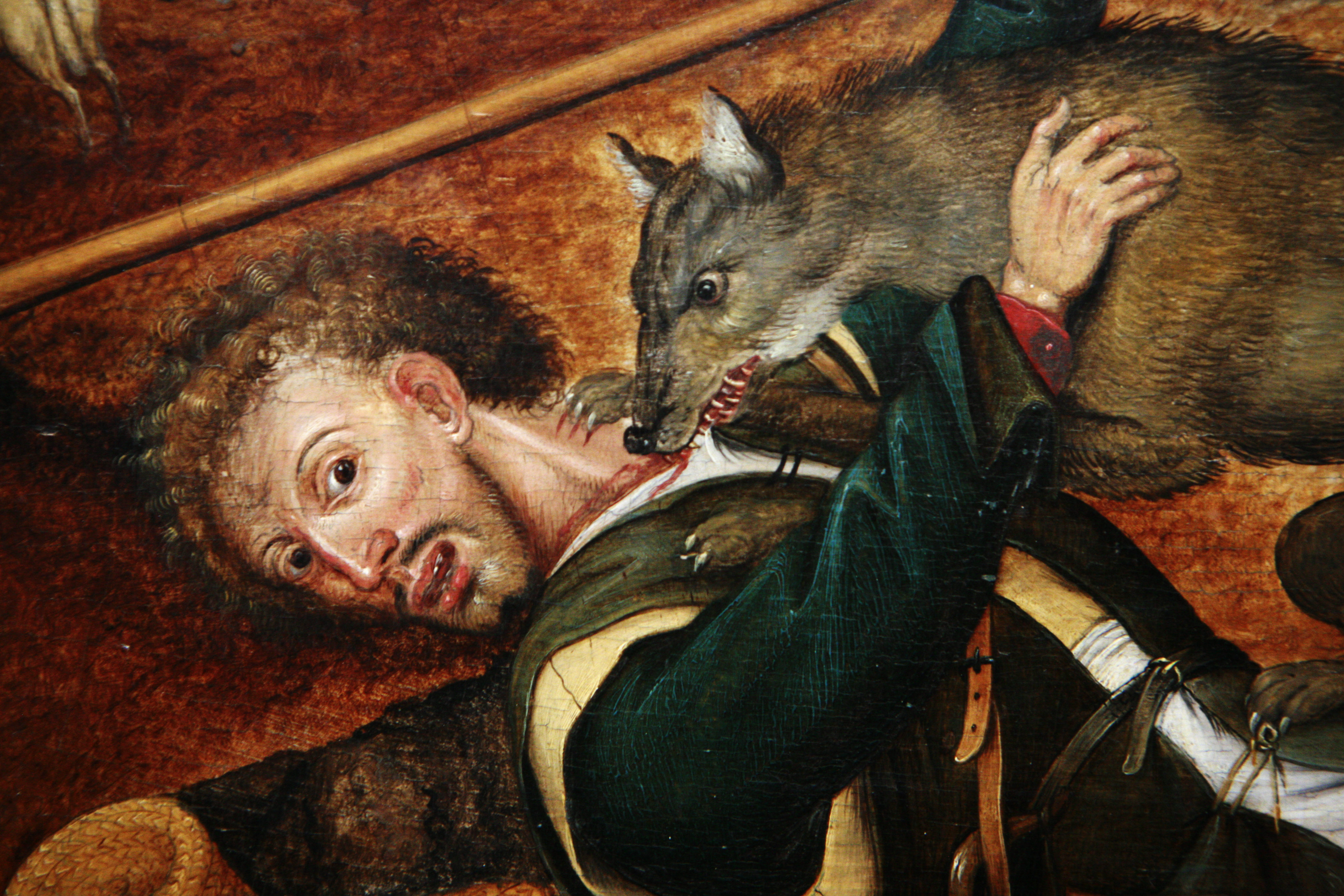
Detail of wolf attacking a shepherd. Painting The Good Shepherd by Pieter Brueghel the Younger, 1616

Individual man-eater death tolls include:

Name	Alleged death toll	Location
Njombe man-eaters (lions)	Up to 1500 (according to the main source)	Tanzania
Champawat Tiger	436	Nepal/India
Leopard of Panar	400	Northern India
Gustave (crocodile)	300+	Burundi, rumored
Talla Des Man Eater	150	India
Leopard of the Central Provinces	150	India
Tsavo's man-eating lions	34–100+	Kenya
Leopard of Rudraprayag	125+	India
Beast of Gévaudan	113	France
Leopard of Golis Range	100	Somaliland
Leopard of Kahani	100	India
Tiger of Bhimashankar	100	India
Chiengi lion	90+	Zambia
Osama Crocodile	83	Uganda
Tigers of Chowgarh	64	India
Wolves of Uttar Pradesh	60+	India
Osama Lion	50+	Tanzania
Namelieza Lion	43	Namibia
Leopard of Gummalapur	42	India
Wolves of Paris	40	France
Mulanje Hyenas	36	Malawi
Leopard of Mulher Valley	30+	India
Tiger of the Dudhwa National Park	24	India
Kirov wolf attacks	22	Russia
Wolves of Turku	22	Finland
Beast of Sarlat (likely a rabid wolf)	18	France
Wolves of Ashta	17	India
Tigress of Jowlagiri	15	India
Wolves of Hazaribagh	13	India
Tigress of Yavatmal	13	India
Wolf of Gysinge	12	Sweden
Sloth bear of Mysore	12	India
Leopard of Punanai	12	Sri Lanka
Port St-John Shark Attacks	11	South Africa Second Beach
Gaver Tigers	10	India
Wolf of Cusago	9	Italy
Tiger of Mundachipallam	7	South India
Sankebetsu bear	7	Japan
Tigress of Moradabad	7	India
Mfuwe man eating lion	6	Zambia
Crocodile of Bang Mood	6	Thailand
Kanda Man Eater	5	India
Tiger of Segur	5	India
Wolf of Soissons	4	France
New Jersey Shark	4	North New Jersey
Thak man-eater	4	India
Leopard of the Yellagiri Hills	3	India
Chuka Man Eater	3	India
Malawi Terror Beast (hyena)	3	Malawi
Battle of Ramree Island crocodile attacks	Uncertain	Myanmar
Wolf of Ansbach	Uncertain	Germany of the Holy Roman Empire
USS Indianapolis shark attacks	Uncertain	Philippine Sea

== See also ==
- Animal attack
- Damnatio ad bestias, an ancient form of execution where condemned prisoners were killed by animals
- Human–wildlife conflict
- Man-eating plant, various legendary large carnivorous plants
- List of large carnivores known to prey on humans
