= Njombe man-eaters =

Series of lion attacks on humans

The Njombe man-eaters were one or more prides of lions responsible for a prolonged series of attacks on people in the Njombe District of southern Tanganyika Territory, now part of Tanzania, between approximately 1932 and 1947. The lions have been described as the most prolific group of man-eating lions recorded, although the number of victims is uncertain.

Later accounts have attributed as many as 1,500 deaths to the lions. This figure cannot be verified from complete contemporary records and is generally presented as a maximum estimate. More cautious descriptions state that the lions killed hundreds of people over a period of about 15 years.

== Background ==
Njombe lies in the southern highlands of Tanzania. During the late nineteenth and early twentieth centuries, East African populations of cattle and wild ungulates were severely affected by outbreaks of rinderpest. Wildlife-control programmes and changes in land use also reduced the availability of some natural prey species.

Researchers studying man-eating lions have identified prey scarcity, illness, injury and patterns of human activity as possible factors in attacks on people.

The precise causes of the Njombe attacks remain uncertain. It has been suggested that shortages of normal prey encouraged lions to hunt people and that the behaviour was subsequently learned by younger members of the prides.

== Attacks ==
The attacks are generally dated from 1932 until 1947. They occurred across a wide rural area rather than at a single settlement. Contemporary and later accounts describe lions attacking people on footpaths, in cultivated fields and near villages.

Unlike several well-known cases involving a solitary animal or a pair of lions, the Njombe attacks were attributed to a substantial pride or a succession of related prides. Some accounts describe approximately 15 lions participating in the attacks.

The reported death toll varies considerably. The frequently repeated figure of 1,500 victims appears in later accounts, but surviving documentation is insufficient to establish an exact total.

== Control campaign ==
British game ranger George Gilman Rushby was assigned to address the attacks during the final years of the outbreak. Rushby had previously worked as an elephant hunter, forestry officer and game ranger in Tanganyika.

Rushby organised trackers and conducted a sustained campaign against lions believed to belong to the man-eating prides. The methods reportedly included following tracks, staking out animal carcasses and shooting lions at bait sites.

The attacks ceased in or around 1947. Rushby subsequently described the campaign in his 1965 memoir, No More the Tusker. His account is one of the principal narrative sources for the events, although it was published nearly two decades after the attacks ended.
