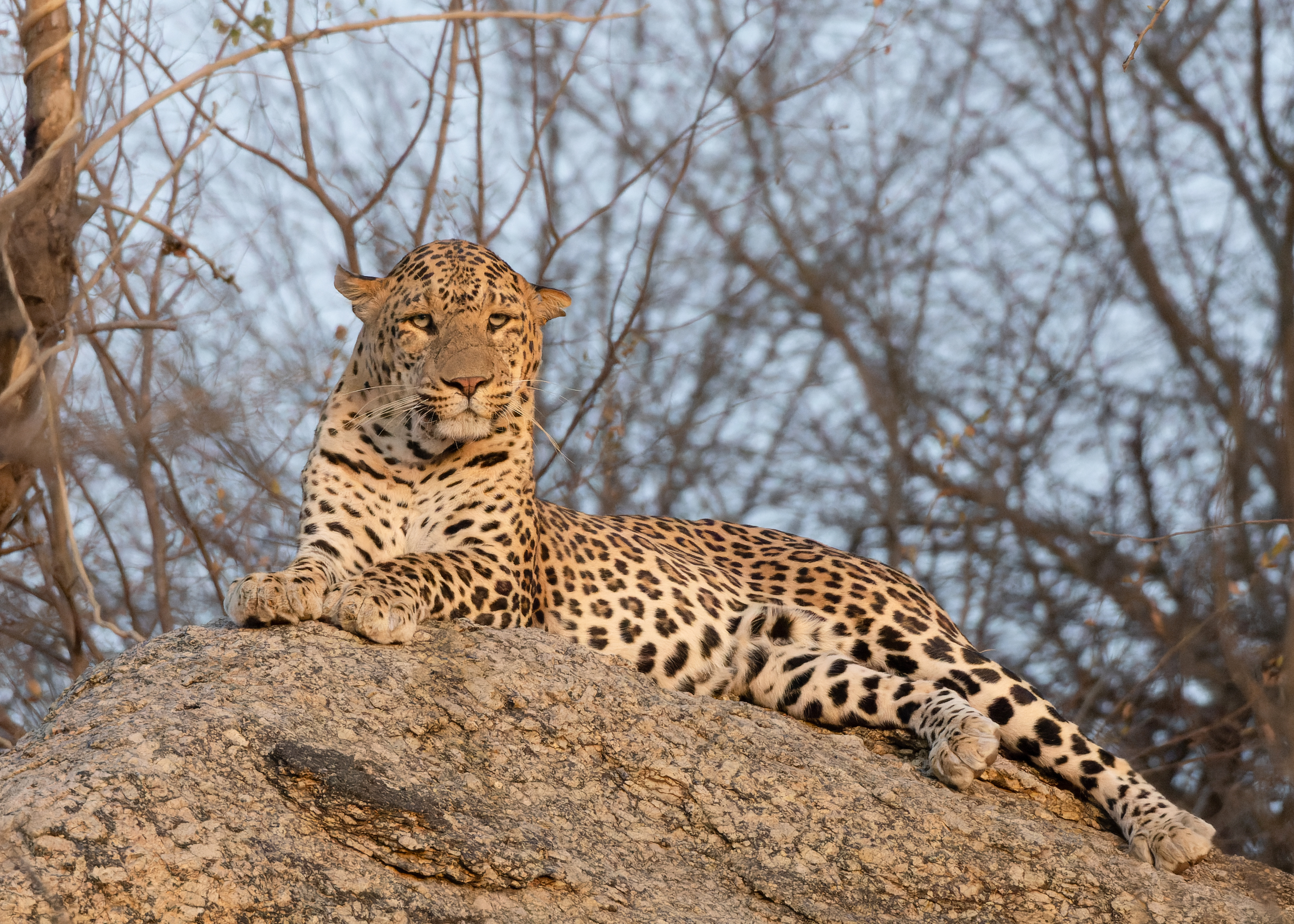
- In Jawai Bandh, Rajasthan, India

Conservation status
- Near Threatened (IUCN 3.1)

Scientific classification
- Kingdom: Animalia
- Phylum: Chordata
- Class: Mammalia
- Order: Carnivora
- Family: Felidae
- Genus: Panthera
- Species: P. pardus
- Subspecies: P. p. fusca

Trinomial name
- Panthera pardus fusca (Meyer, 1794)

Synonyms
- P. p. pernigra (Hodgson, 1863); P. p. millardi (Pocock, 1930)

= Indian leopard =

Leopard subspecies

The Indian leopard (Panthera pardus fusca) is a subspecies of the leopard (P. pardus). It is widely distributed on the Indian subcontinent. It is threatened by illegal trade of skins and body parts, and persecution due to human-leopard conflict and retaliation for livestock depredation.

== Taxonomy ==
Felis fusca was the scientific name proposed by Friedrich Albrecht Anton Meyer in 1794 who described a black leopard from Bengal that was on display at the Tower of London. Leopardus perniger proposed by Brian Houghton Hodgson in 1863 were five leopard skins from Nepal, out of which three were black. He mentioned Sikkim and Nepal as habitat. Panthera pardus millardi proposed by Reginald Innes Pocock in 1930 was a single leopard skin and skull from Kashmir. It differed from typical P. p. fusca skins by longer hair and a more greyish colour.

Since leopard populations in Nepal, Sikkim and Kashmir are not geographically isolated from leopard populations in the Indian subcontinent, they were subsumed to P. p. fusca in 1996. The Indus River in the west and the Himalayas in the north form topographical barriers to the dispersal of this subspecies. In the east, the Ganges Delta and the lower course of the Brahmaputra River are thought to form natural barriers to the range of the Indochinese leopard.

A genetic analysis of 49 leopard skin samples collected in Azad Jammu Kashmir and Galyat regions of northern Pakistan revealed haplotypes of both Persian and Indian leopards, indicating intergradation of both subspecies in this region.

== Characteristics ==
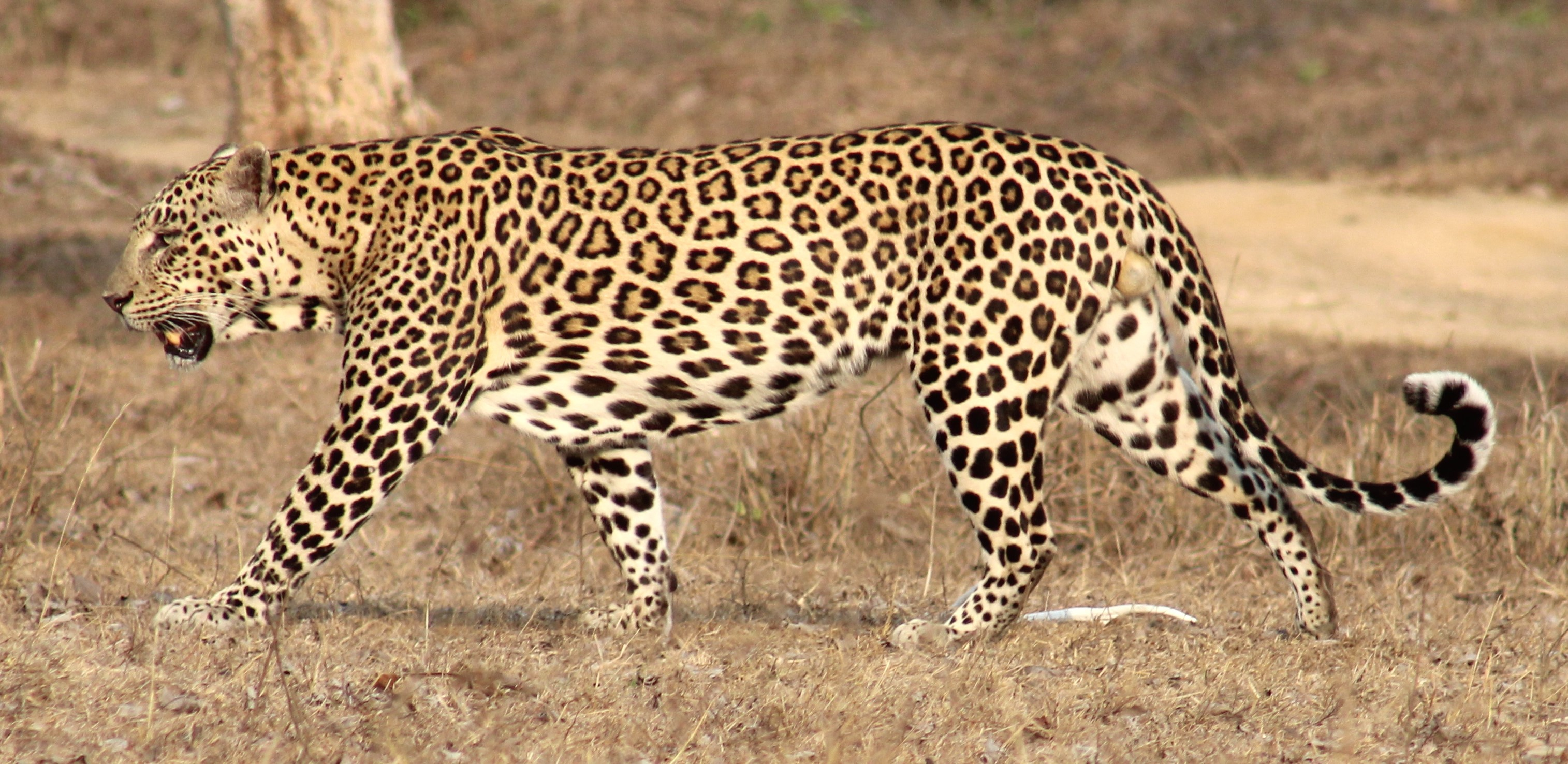
Indian leopard in Bandipur National Park

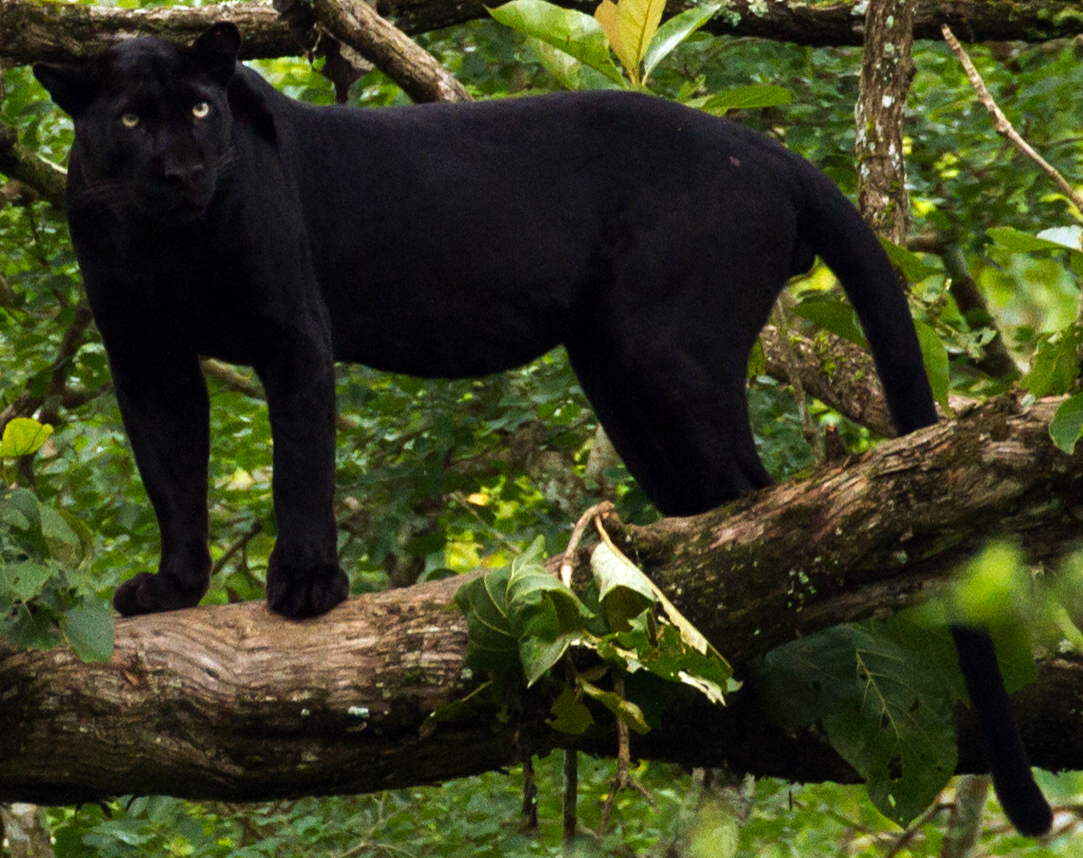
Black leopard at Nagarhole National Park

The Indian leopard has strong legs and a long, well-formed tail, broad muzzle, short ears, small, yellowish-grey eyes, and light-grey ocular bulbs. Its coat is spotted and rosetted on a pale yellow to yellowish-brown or golden background, except for the melanistic forms; the spots fade toward the white underbelly and the insides and lower parts of the legs. Rosettes are most prominent on the back, flanks and hindquarters. The pattern of the rosettes is unique to each individual. Juveniles have woolly fur, and appear dark due to the densely arranged spots. The white-tipped tail is 60–100 cm (24–39 in) long, white underneath, and displays rosettes, which form incomplete bands toward the end. The rosettes are larger in other leopard subspecies in Asia. Fur colour tends to be more pale and cream in arid habitats, more grey in colder climates, and of a darker golden hue in rainforest habitats.

The clouded leopard can be told apart by its diffuse "clouds" of spots compared to the smaller and distinct rosettes of the leopard, longer legs and thinner tail.

=== Skull ===
The largest skull for an Indian leopard was recorded in 1920, and belonged to a large, melanistic cat in the area of Ootacamund, Tamil Nadu. The black panther was said to have bigger forelimbs and forequarters than hind-limbs and hind-quarters, with a skull and claws nearly as large as those of a tigress. The skull measured 280 mm (11.2 in) in basal length, and 200 mm (7.9 in) in breadth, and weighed 1,000 g (2 lb 4 oz). By comparison, the skull of one western African leopard measured 286 mm (11.25 in) in basal length, and 181.0 mm (7.125 in) in breadth, and weighed 0.79 kg (1 lb 12 oz).

=== Size ===
Male Indian leopards grow to between 127 cm (4 ft 2 in) and 142 cm (4 ft 8 in) in body size with a 76 cm (2 ft 6 in) to 91 cm (3 ft) long tail and weigh between 50 and 77 kg (110 and 170 lb). Females are smaller, growing to between 104 cm (3 ft 5 in) and 117 cm (3 ft 10 in) in body size with a 76 cm (2 ft 6 in) to 87.6 cm (2 ft 10.5 in) long tail, and weigh between 29 and 34 kg (64 and 75 lb). Sexually dimorphic, males are larger and heavier than females.

The largest wild individual appears to have been a male man-eater that was shot in the Dhadhol area of Bilaspur district, Himachal Pradesh in 2016. It reportedly measured 2.62 m (8 ft 7 in) from head to tail, 860 mm (34 in) at the shoulder, and weighed 71 kg (157 lb).

== Distribution and habitat ==
The Indian leopard is distributed in India, Nepal, Bhutan and parts of Pakistan. Bangladesh has no viable leopard population but there are occasional sightings in the forests of Sylhet, Chittagong Hill Tracts and Cox's Bazar. It inhabits tropical rainforests, dry deciduous forests, temperate forests and northern coniferous forests but does not occur in the mangrove forests of the Sundarbans.

In southern Tibet, it was recorded in Qomolangma National Nature Preserve.

In Nepal's Kanchenjunga Conservation Area, a melanistic leopard was photographed at an elevation of 4,300 m (14,100 ft) by a camera trap in May 2012.

=== Population in India ===
In 2015, 7,910 leopards were estimated to live in and around tiger habitat in India; about 12,000 to 14,000 leopards were speculated to live in the entire country. The following table gives the major leopard populations in the Indian states. As of 2020, the leopard population within forested habitats in India's tiger range landscapes was estimated at 12,172 to 13,535 individuals. Surveyed landscapes included elevations below 2,600 m (8,500 ft) in the Shivalik Hills and Gangetic plains, Central India and Eastern Ghats, Western Ghats, as well as the Brahmaputra River basin and hills in Northeast India. As per 2022, the Indian leopard population was estimated at 13,874 individuals.

Leopard population by state
State	Leopards (2022)
Andhra Pradesh	569
Arunachal Pradesh	42
Assam	74
Bihar	86
Chhattisgarh	722
Goa	77
Jharkhand	51
Karnataka	1,879
Kerala	570
Madhya Pradesh	3,907
Maharashtra	1,985
Odisha	568
Rajasthan	721
Tamil Nadu	1070
Telangana	297
Uttar Pradesh	371
Uttarakhand	652
West Bengal	233
Total	13,874

== Behaviour and ecology ==
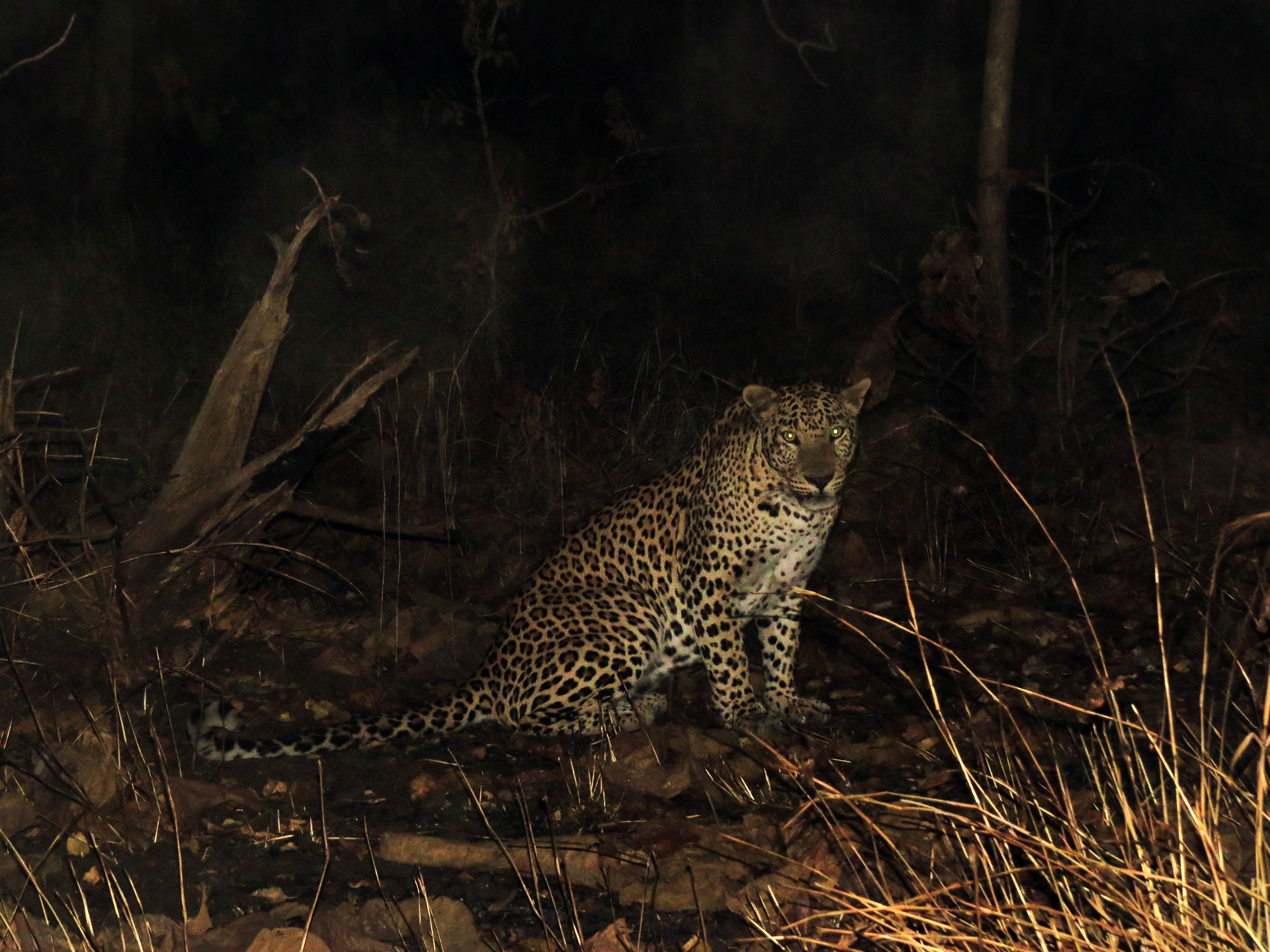
Leopard at night in Gir National Park

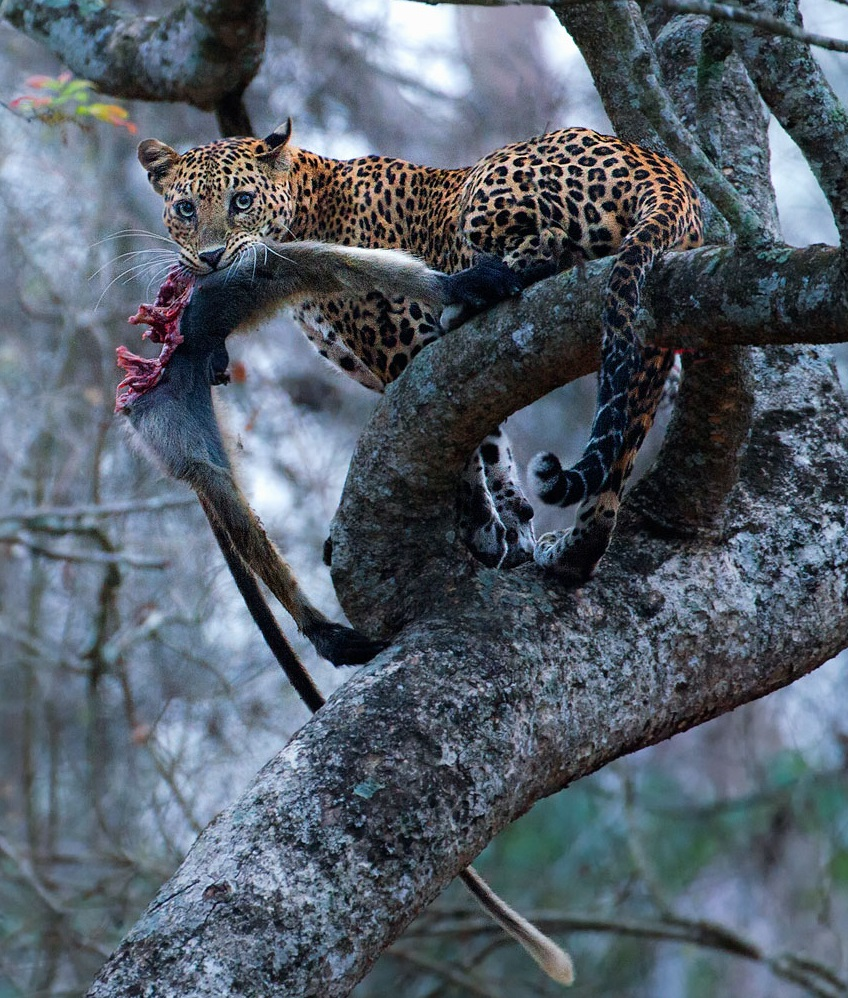
Leopard with a killed langur

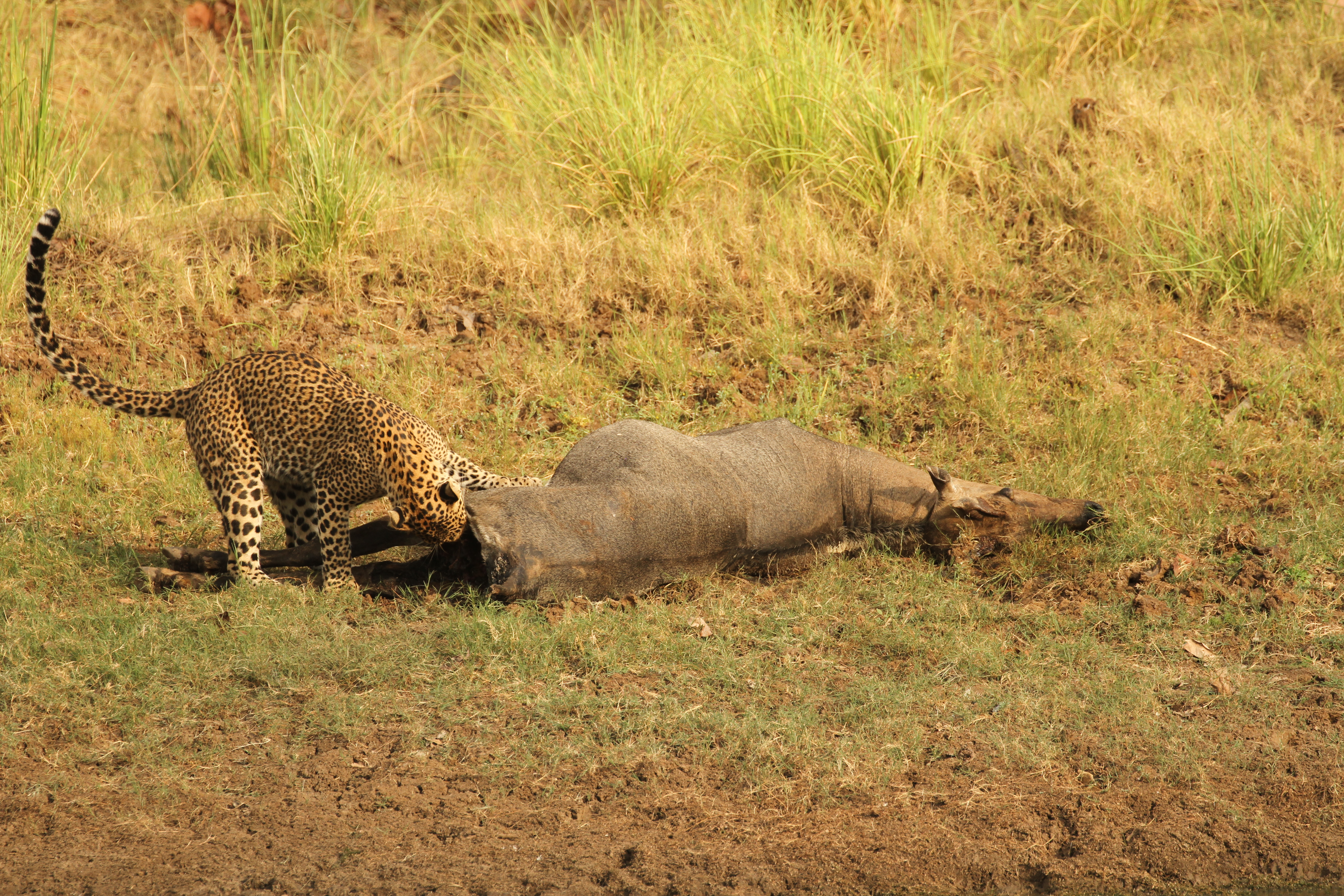
Leopard with a killed nilgai in Satpura National Park

The leopard is elusive, solitary, and largely nocturnal. It is known for its ability in climbing, and has been observed resting on tree branches during the day, dragging its kills up trees and hanging them there, and descending from trees headfirst. It is a powerful swimmer, although is not as disposed to swimming as the tiger. It is very agile, and can run at over 58 km/h (36 mph), leap over 6 m (20 ft) horizontally, and jump up to 3 m (9.8 ft) vertically. It produces a number of vocalizations, including grunts, roars, growls, meows, and purrs.

In Nepal's Bardia National Park, home ranges of male leopards comprised about 48 km^{2} (19 sq mi), and of females about 17 km^{2} (6.6 sq mi); female home ranges decreased to 5 to 7 km^{2} (1.9 to 2.7 sq mi) when they had young cubs. In Gir National Park, the home range of a male radio-collared leopard was estimated at 28.15 km^{2} (10.87 sq mi). It killed prey once in 3.7 days.

The leopard is a versatile, opportunistic hunter, and has a very broad diet. It is able to take large prey due to its massive skull and powerful jaw muscles. In Sariska Tiger Reserve, the dietary spectrum of the Indian leopard includes axis deer, sambar deer, nilgai, wild boar, common langur, Indian hare and peafowl. In Periyar Tiger Reserve, primates make up a large proportion of its diet.

=== Reproduction ===
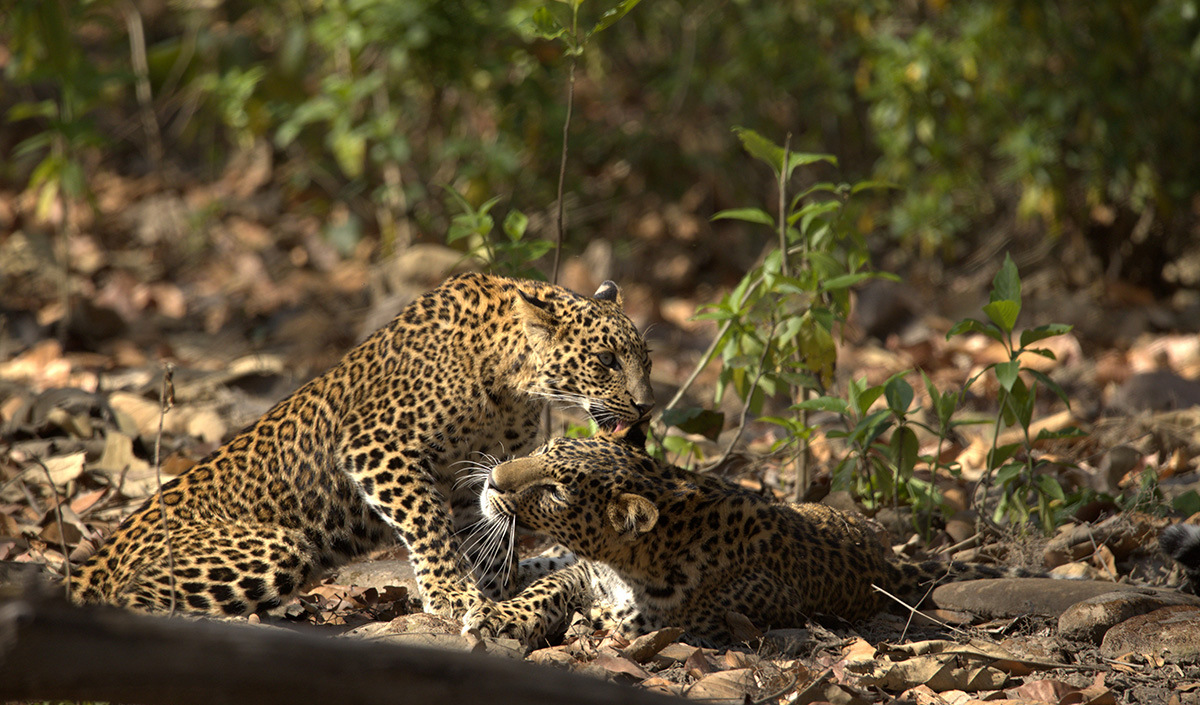
A pair of leopards in Rajaji National Park

leopard in Chitwan National Park

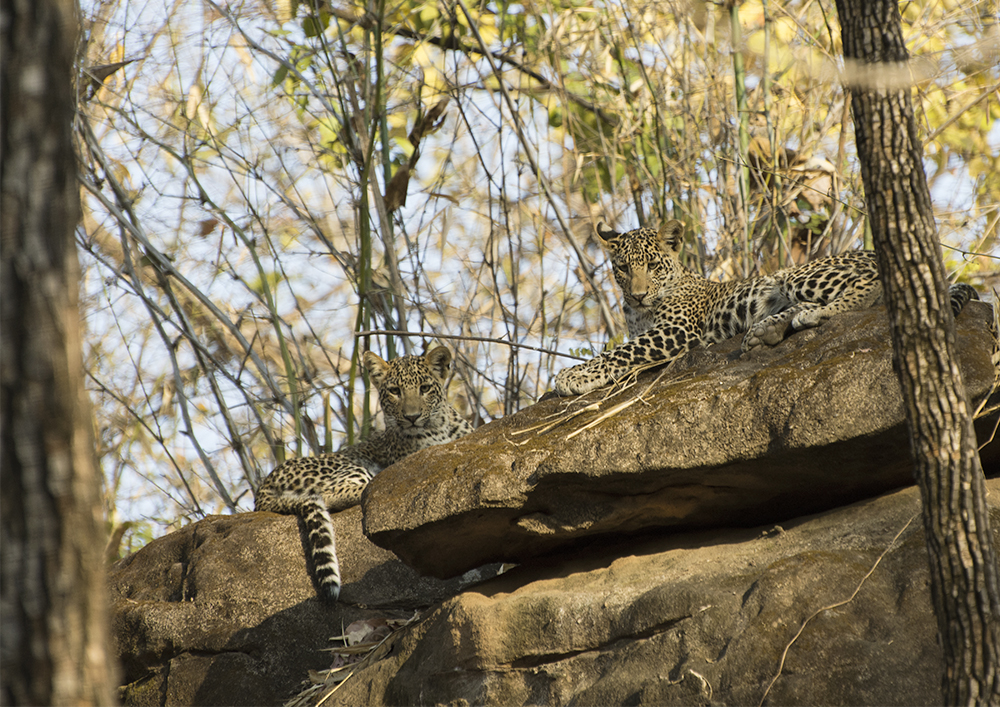
Leopard cubs in Satpura Tiger Reserve

Depending on the region, the leopard mates all year round. The estrous cycle lasts about 46 days and the female usually is in heat for 6–7 days. Gestation lasts for 90 to 105 days. Cubs are usually born in a litter of 2–4 cubs. Mortality of cubs is estimated at 41–50% during the first year. Females give birth in a cave, crevice among boulders, hollow tree, or thicket to make a den. Cubs are born with closed eyes, which open four to nine days after birth. The fur of the young tends to be longer and thicker than that of adults. Their pelage is also more grey in colour with less defined spots. Around three months of age, the young begin to follow the mother on hunts. At one year of age, leopard young can probably fend for themselves, but remain with the mother for 18–24 months. The average typical life span of a leopard is between 12 and 17 years.

=== Sympatric carnivores ===
Indian leopards are not common in habitats where tiger density is high, and are wedged between prime tiger habitat on the one side, and cultivated village land on the other. Where the tiger population is high or increasing, tigers drive leopards off to areas located closer to human settlements, like in Nepal's Bardia National Park and Sariska Tiger Reserve. Resource partitioning occurs where leopards share their range with tigers. Leopards tend to take smaller prey, usually less than 75 kg (165 lb), where tigers are present. In areas where leopard and tiger are sympatric, coexistence is reportedly not the general rule, with leopards being few where tigers are numerous. The mean leopard population density decreased significantly from 9.76 to 2.07 animals per 100 km^{2} (39 sq mi), while the mean tiger population density increased from 3.31 to 5.81 animals/100 km^{2} from 2004–2005 to 2008 in Rajaji National Park following the relocation of pastoralists out of the park. There, the two species have high dietary overlap, and an increase in the tiger population resulted in a sharp decrease in the leopard population and a shift in the leopard diet to small prey (from 9% to 36%) and domestic prey from 6.8% to 31.8%. In Chitwan National Park, leopards killed prey ranging from less than 25–100 kg (55–220 lb) in weight with most kills in the 25–50 kg (55–110 lb) range. Tigers killed more prey in the 50–100 kg (110–220 lb) range. There were also differences in the microhabitat preferences of the individual tiger and leopard followed over five months; the tiger used roads and forested areas more frequently, while the leopard used recently burned areas and open areas more frequently. When a tiger killed baits at sites formerly frequented by leopards, the leopards did not hunt there for some time.

In the tropical forests of India's Nagarhole National Park, tigers selected prey weighing more than 176 kg (388 lb), whereas leopards selected prey in the 30–175 kg (66–386 lb) range. In tropical forests, they do not always avoid the larger cats by hunting at different times. With relatively abundant prey and differences in the size of prey selected, tigers and leopards seem to successfully coexist without competitive exclusion or interspecies dominance hierarchies that may be more common to the leopard's co-existence with the lion in savanna habitats. In areas with high tiger populations, such as in the central parts of India's Kanha National Park, leopards are not permanent residents, but transients. They were common near villages at the periphery of the park and outside the park. In a reserved forest of southern India, species preyed upon by leopard, dhole and striped hyena overlapped considerably.

The leopard and snow leopard both hunt Himalayan tahr and musk deer, but the leopard usually prefers forested habitats located at lower elevations. Leopard may conflict with sloth bears and can follow them up trees. Bear cubs are probably far more vulnerable and healthy adult bears may be avoided by leopards. One leopard killed a three-quarters grown female sloth bear in an apparently lengthy fight that culminated in the trees. Apparently, a sloth bear killed a leopard in a confrontation in Yala National Park, Sri Lanka but was itself badly injured in the fight and was subsequently put down by park rangers.

== Threats ==
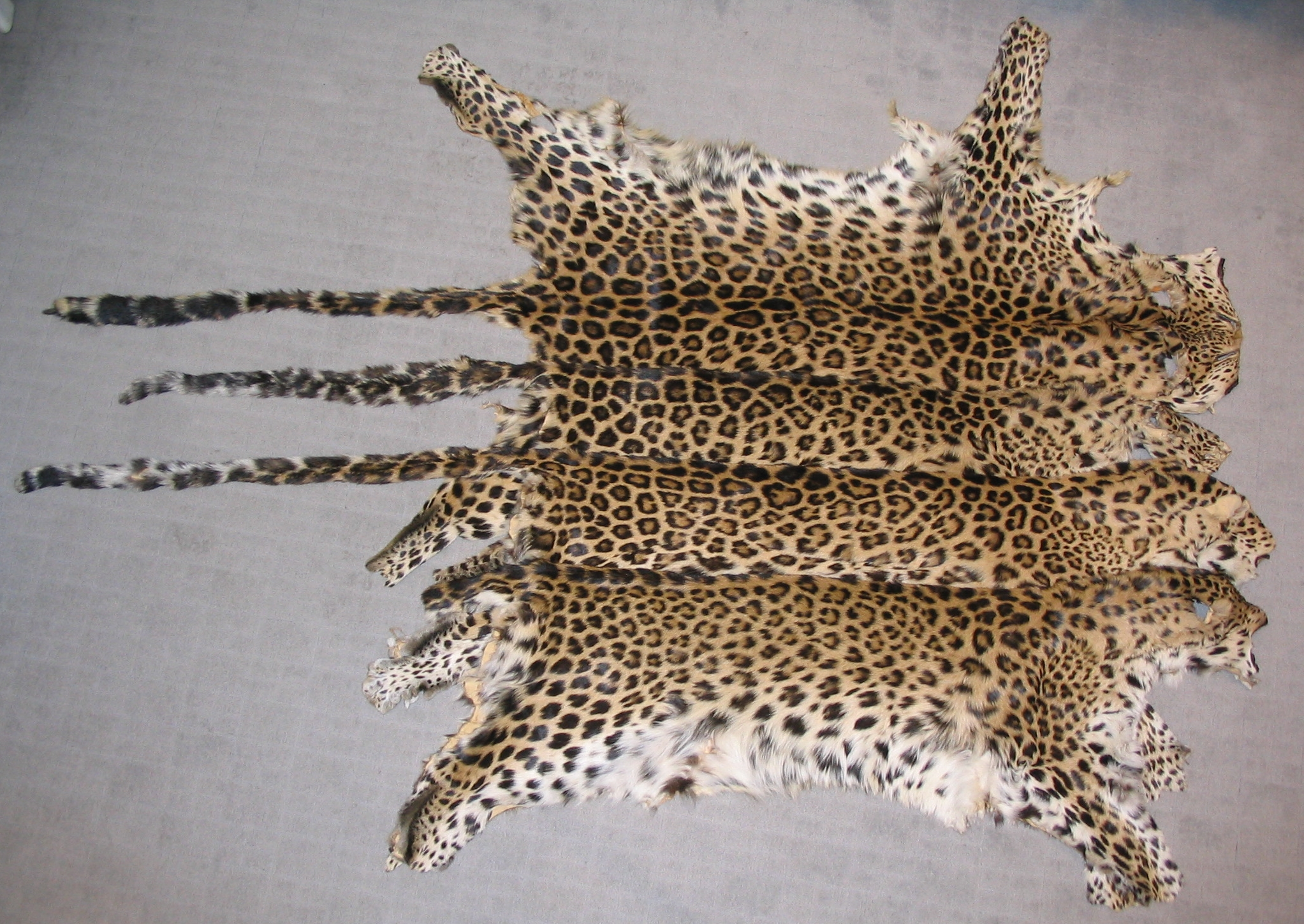
Leopard skins

Hunting of Indian leopards for the illegal wildlife trade is the biggest threat to their survival. They are also threatened by loss of habitat and fragmentation of formerly connected populations, and various levels of human–leopard conflict in human–dominated landscapes.

Several newspapers reported of leopards falling into open wells and being rescued with the help of Forest Department officials.

=== Poaching ===
A significant immediate threat to wild leopard populations is the illegal trade in poached skins and body parts between India, Nepal and China. The governments of these countries have failed to implement adequate enforcement response, and wildlife crime remained a low priority in terms of political commitment and investment for years. There are well-organised gangs of professional poachers, who move from place to place and set up camp in vulnerable areas. Skins are rough-cured in the field and handed over to dealers, who send them for further treatment to Indian tanning centres. Buyers choose the skins from dealers or tanneries and smuggle them through a complex interlinking network to markets outside India, mainly in China. Seized skins in Kathmandu confirm the city's role as a key staging point for illegal skins smuggled from India bound for Tibet and China.

It is likely that seizures represent a tiny fraction of the total illegal trade, with the majority of smuggled skins reaching their intended end market. Seizures revealed:

- in India: more than 200 leopards killed by humans every year, leopards in India are seven times more likely to be killed than Indian tigers. WPSI reported that during 1994-2010 at least 3,189 leopards were killed, then again in 2002-2010 period at least 200 or four leopards per week were reportedly killed by poachers for illegal trade. For every tiger skin, there are at least seven leopard skins in the haul.
- in Nepal: more than 40 leopards were reported killed by humans every year, e.g. 243 poached leopards between May 2002 and May 2008;
- in China and Tibet: nearly 130 leopards were killed every year, e.g. more than 774 poached leopards between July 1999 and September 2005.

=== Human–leopard conflict ===
==== Causes of conflict ====
Expansion of agriculturally used land, encroachment by humans and their livestock into protected areas are main factors contributing to habitat loss and decrease of wild prey. As a result, leopards approach human settlements, where they are tempted to prey on dogs, pigs and goats – domestic livestock, which constitutes an important part of their diet, if they live on the periphery of human habitations. Human–leopard conflict situations ensue, and have increased in recent years. In retaliation for attacks on livestock, leopards are shot, poisoned and trapped in snares. The leopards are considered to be unwanted trespassers by villagers. Conservationists criticize these actions, claiming that people are encroaching on the leopard's native habitat. India's Forest Department is entitled to set up traps only in cases of a leopard having attacked humans. If only the presence of a crowd of people prevents the leopard from escaping, then the crowd has to be dispersed and the animal allowed to escape.

As urban areas expanded, the natural habitats of leopards shrunk resulting in leopards venturing into urbanized areas due to easy access of domestic food sources. Karnataka has a high number of such conflicts. In recent years, leopards were sighted in Bangalore, and the forest department captured six leopards in the city's outskirts, relocated four of them to various other locations.

==== Man-eater leopards ====
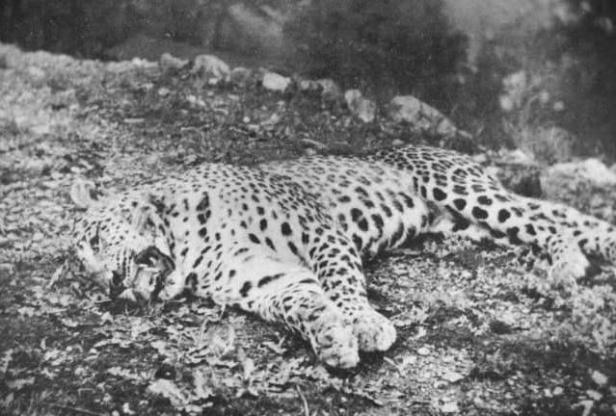
The Panar Leopard killed by Jim Corbett

Every year more leopards are killed by humans than the humans killed by leopards. On average nearly 400 leopards are reported killed yearly in India, Nepal and China combined based on the leopard skins caught from the poachers, though the actual number of leopards killed by humans is likely to be several times higher. In and around the Shivalik hills of Himachal Pradesh alone, 68 leopards were killed by people between 2001 and 2013, of which only 10 were man-eaters.

The frequency of Leopard attacks on humans varies by geographical region and historical period. Since India and Nepal have the majority of Indian leopards population, consequently attacks are regularly reported only from India and Nepal. Among the five "big cats", leopards are less likely to become man-eaters—only jaguars and snow leopards have a less fearsome reputation. While leopards generally avoid humans, they tolerate proximity to humans better than lions and tigers and often come into conflict with humans when raiding livestock.

Attacks in India are still reported, since leopards population in India outnumber population of all other large carnivores combined, consequently the number of humans killed by leopards is also more than those killed by all other large carnivores combined.

In Nepal, where most attacks occur in the midland regions, i.e. in the Terai, midhills, and lesser Himalaya, the rate of leopard predation on humans results in approximately 1.9 human deaths annually per million inhabitants. .

Historically, with rapid urbanization in late 19th and early 20th centuries, leopard attacks may have peaked in India during those times. Notable man-eaters of that era include Leopard of Central Provinces, Rudraprayag, Gummalapur, Yellagiri Hills, Golis Range and Panar.

==== Ways to minimise conflict ====
Key to avoiding conflict or leopard's predation of humans is to shift the focus on human's behavioral change to minimise the chances of a leopard encounter or attack, which can be achieved by "clearing bushes and overgrowth around homes to minimise hiding spaces for leopards, leaving a light on at night to deter them, and ensuring people, especially children, did not go out alone at night." Leopards are shy and avoid humans and are more active at night, during encounter with leopards "give way to the leopard and move away calmly" and alert the forest department immediately.

== Conservation ==
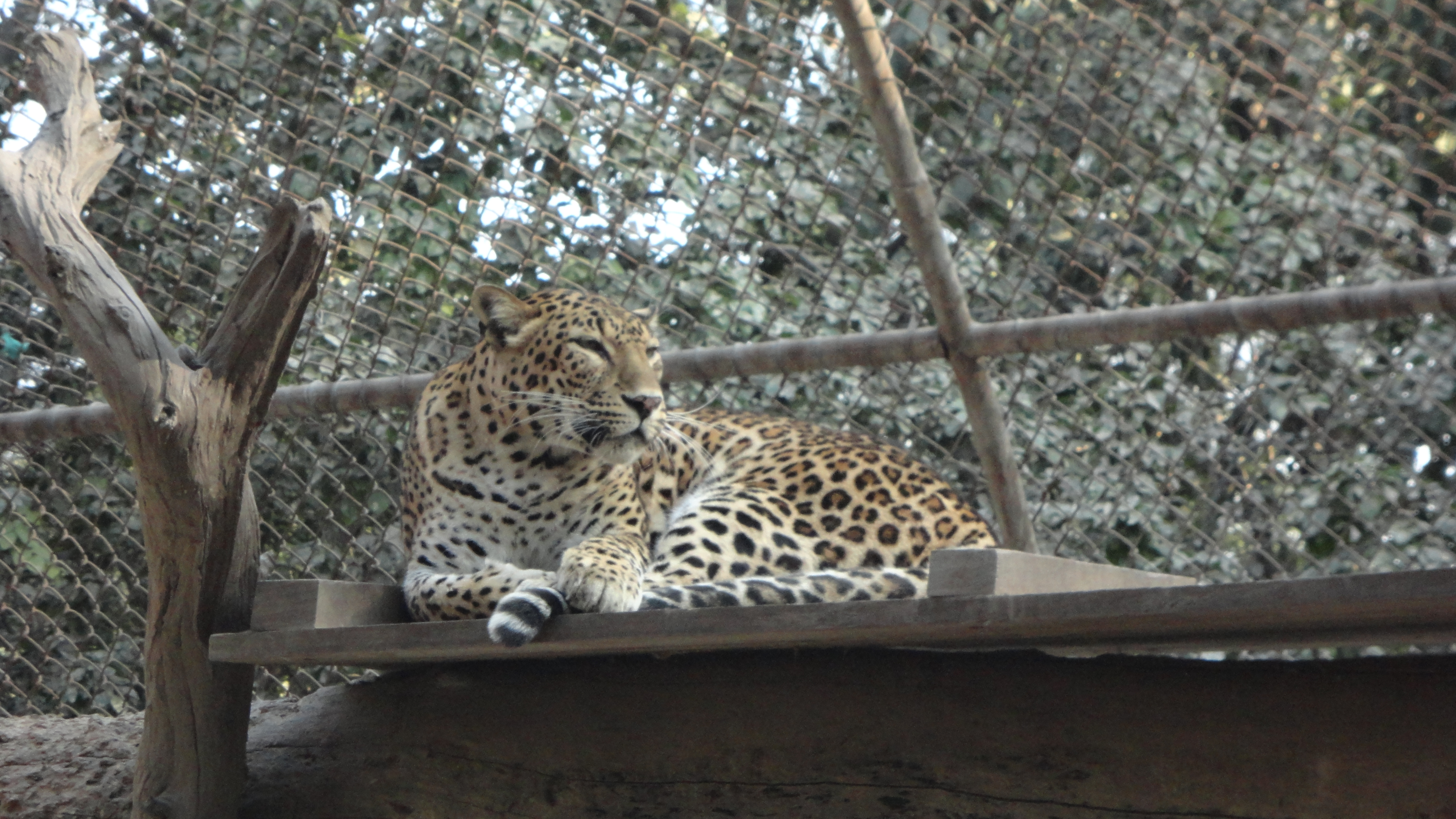
A leopard in National Zoological Park Delhi

Panthera pardus is listed in CITES Appendix I. Despite India and Nepal being contracting parties to CITES, national legislation of both countries does not incorporate and address the spirit and concerns of CITES. Trained human resources, basic facilities and effective networks for control of poaching and trade in wildlife are lacking. The Indian leopard is considered Vulnerable in India, Bhutan, and Nepal but Critically Endangered in Pakistan.

Frederick Walter Champion was one of the first in India who after World War I advocated for the conservation of leopards, condemned sport hunting and recognised their key role in the ecosystem. Billy Arjan Singh championed their cause since the early 1970s.

There are a few leopard rescue centres in India, such as the Manikdoh Leopard Rescue Centre in Junnar, but more rescue and rehabilitation centres are being planned. Some wildlife experts think that such centres are not an ideal solution, but that conflict resolution by way of changing human behaviour, land use or grazing patterns and implementing responsible forest management to lessen human-animal conflict would be far more effective to conserve leopards.

== In culture and literature ==
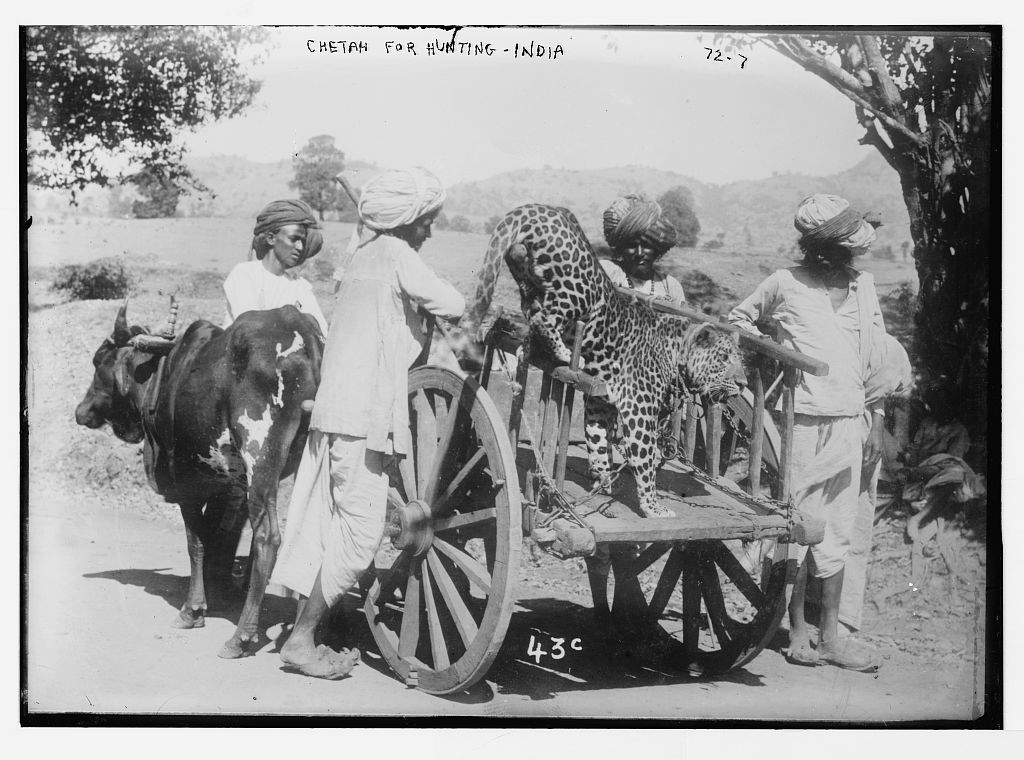
An Indian leopard used for hunting, probably early 20th century

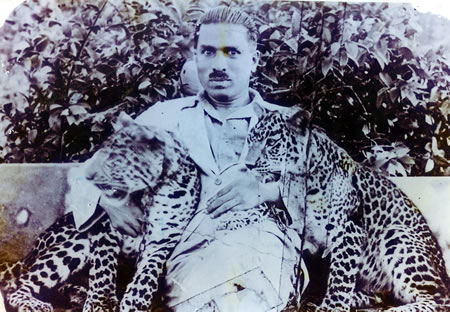
Cajetan Lobo with two pet Indian leopards

- An Indian black panther named 'Bagheera' is featured in Rudyard Kipling's 1894 novel The Jungle Book, as well as in Disney's 1967 and 2016 film adaptations.
- The book Man-Eaters of Kumaon is based on man-eating leopards and tigers in Kumaon Division.
- Ajoba is a 2014 Marathi film directed by Sujay Dahake and written by Gauri Bapat. It is supposedly based on true events.
- Local people in the Western Ghats call a darkish grey panther pogeyan, which purportedly lives in the high-elevation grasslands of the Anamudi forest.

== See also ==
- African leopard
- Amur leopard
- Panthera pardus tulliana
- Arabian leopard
- Indochinese leopard
- Javan leopard
- Sri Lankan leopard
- Zanzibar leopard
- Panthera pardus spelaea
