= Punanai =

Village in Eastern Province, Sri Lanka

Punani புனானை දොඹාපෙ
- Village
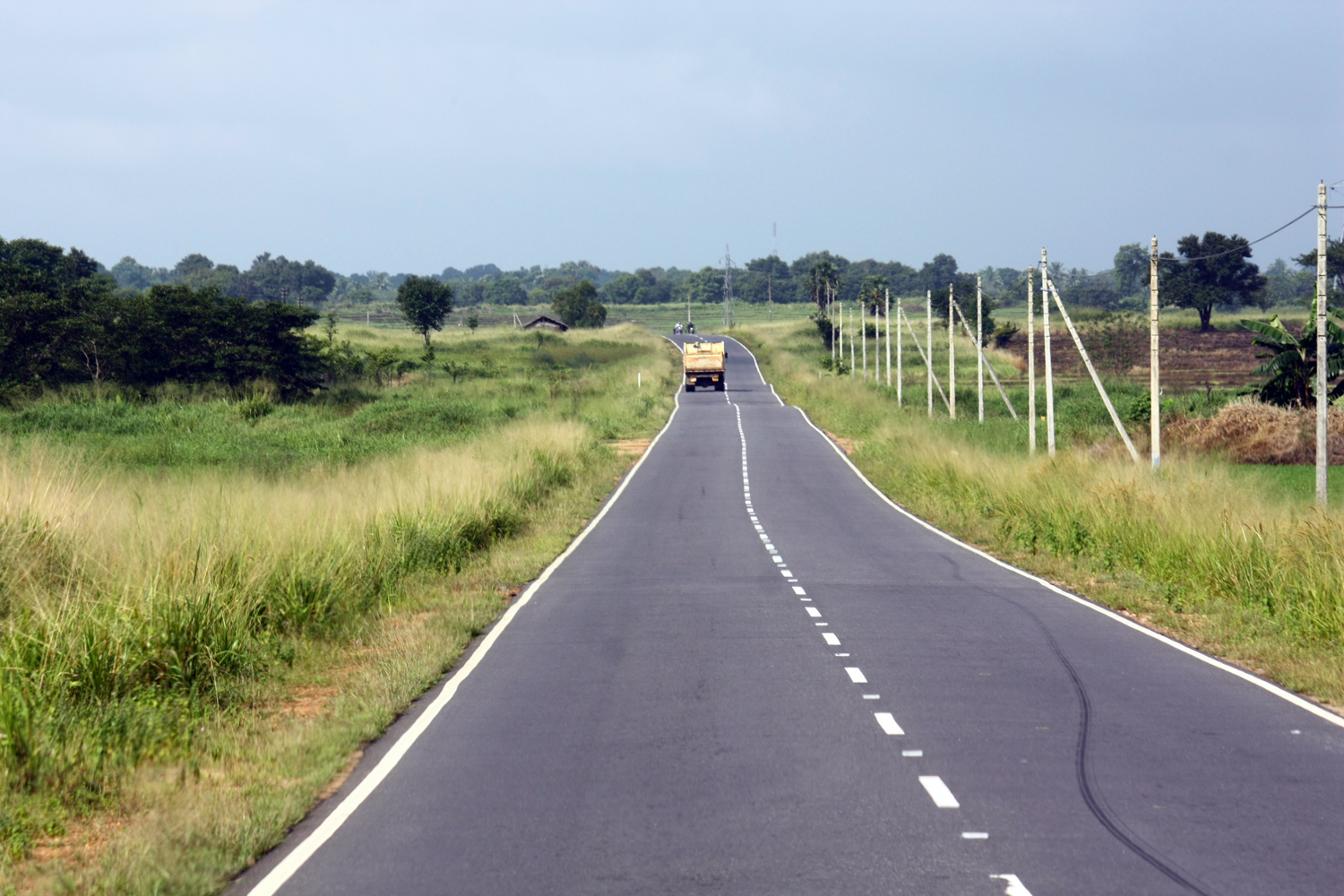
- Batticaloa Highway from Punanai

- Location within Sri Lanka
- Country: Sri Lanka
- Province: Eastern
- District: Batticaloa
- DS Division: Koralai Pattu West

Punanai (Tamil: புனானை, romanized: Puṉāṉai; Sinhala: දොඹාපෙ, romanized: Dom̆bāpe; sometimes spelled Punani) is a small hamlet in Sri Lanka, made famous in 1920 by a man-eating leopard. This is reflected in the book titled The Man-Eater of Punanai: A Journey of Discovery to the Jungles of Old Ceylon, by Christopher Ondaatje.
