= Malawi Terror Beast =

Unidentified man-eating animal

The Malawi terror beast refers to a possibly rabid spotted hyena which killed at least three people and severely injured 16 others in the central Dowa district, some 100 kilometres (62 mi) from Lilongwe, in 2003.

== History ==
=== Attacks ===
The incidents occurred in the Dowa district in early 2003. After a suspected spotted hyena infected with the rabies virus was seen near the central Dowa district, at least 4,000 people fled from the area (and from at least four nearby villages) to seek refuge at a community hall located inside the district headquarters. The animal would terrorize several heavily populated areas; attacked survivors would bear life-altering injuries and serious disfigurement, ranging from hands being chewed off to losing their ears, eyes, fingers, toes and feet during their respective struggles, in addition to various bite wounds and scratches. One woman having her lips and nose bitten off by the animal.

A similar set of attacks occurred in August 2002, with a rabid hyena eventually being tracked down and shot by wildlife rangers.

The animal in the 2003 attacks was ultimately responsible for the deaths of three people, and the injuring of at least 16 more. By April, while the animal was still loose, the affected communities had returned to their normal daily routines.
