= William Rushby =

English footballer

Personal information
- Full name: William Rushby
- Date of birth: 18 November 1888
- Place of birth: Cleethorpes, England
- Date of death: 1981 (aged 92–93)
- Position: Wing half

Senior career*
Years	Team	Apps	(Gls)
1911–1912	Cleethorpes Town		
1912–1914	Grimsby Town	5	(0)
1914	Castleford Town		
1914–1919	Grimsby Rovers		
1919–1920	Cleethorpes Town		
1920–192?	Haycroft Rovers		
- * Club domestic league appearances and goals

William Rushby (18 November 1888 – 1981) was an English professional footballer who played as a wing half.
