= Wolf of Gysinge =

1820s man-eating wolf in Sweden

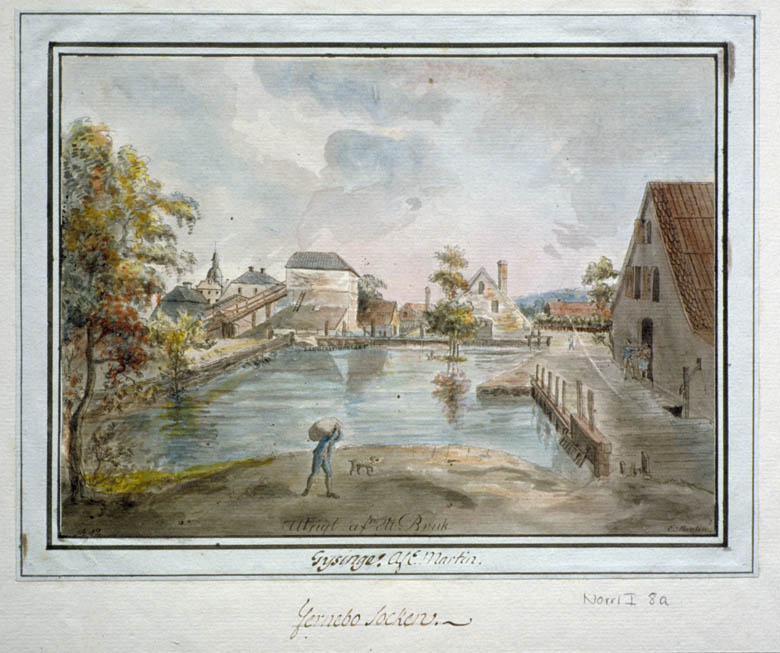
Gysinge as it looked around 1790.

The Wolf of Gysinge was a man-eating wolf which, in three months, attacked and killed many children in Gysinge near central Sweden in the early 1820s.

== Attacks ==
During a three-month period between December 30, 1820, and March 27, 1821, the wolf attacked 31 people, which resulted in a total of 12 fatalities, most of whom were partially consumed by the wolf. The attacks occurred near Gysinge (within present-day Sandviken Municipality) in Uppland, near the border of Dalarna and Gästrikland in central Sweden.

With the exception of one 19-year-old woman, all victims of fatal attacks were children between the ages of three and a half and 15; in addition, the 15 injured victims were mostly children, except for one 18-year-old male.

== Wolf ==
The wolf was killed on March 27, 1821. Historical accounts indicate that before becoming a man-eater, the wolf was captured as a pup in 1817, and kept in captivity for several years before escaping. In captivity, wolves tend to lose their natural shyness of humans and thus attack more frequently if they escape from captivity.

== Dramatisation ==
The incident was dramatised in the BBC Two TV series Manhunters in the final episode, "The Man-Eating Wolves of Gysinge", which aired on 16 December 2005. The episode took artistic liberty in portraying the number of wolves involved in the attacks, showing two animals instead of one. The man-eating wolves were portrayed by Czechoslovakian Wolfdogs.

== See also ==
- List of wolves
