= Gumlapur =

Gumlapur Gumlapoor
- Village
- Location in Telangana, India Gumlapur (India)
- Coordinates: 18.803173°N 78.758264°E
- Country: India
- State: Telangana
- Mandal: Korutla
- District: Jagtial
- Region: Telangana

Government
  - Type: Grama Panchayath
  - Body: Yadagiri Ammai(Sarpanch) Tota Narayana(MPTC)
- Elevation: 308 m (1,010 ft)

Population (2009)
  - Total: 1,600

Languages
  - Official: Telugu
- Time zone: UTC+5:30 (IST)
- Postal code: 505 453
- Area code: 91-(0)8722
- Vehicle registration: AP 15
- Climate: BW (Köppen)

Gumlapur (also Gumlapoor or Gummulapuram) is a village in the Korutla Mandal Jagtial district of the Indian state of Telangana, in the Deccan Plateau in the north part of Telangana.
