= Odesa Zoo =

Coordinates: 46.4675°N 30.7317°E

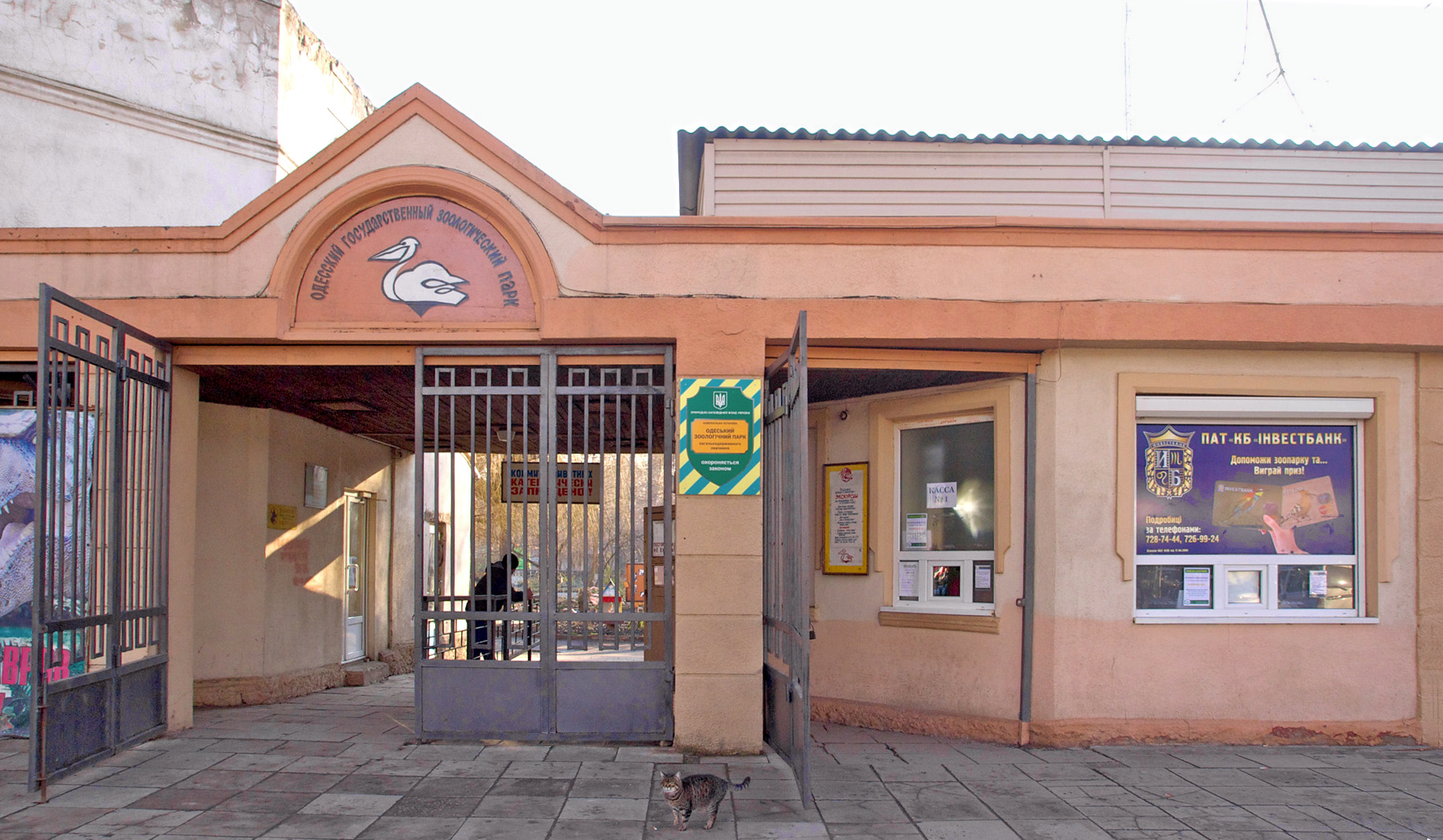
- Odesa Zoo, main entrance
- Interactive map of Odesa Zoo
- Date opened: 1922
- Location: Odesa, Ukraine
- Land area: 5.9 hectares (15 acres)
- No. of animals: 720 (May 2011)
- No. of species: 153 (May 2011)
- Annual visitors: 349921 (2010)
- Website: http://zoo.od.ua/

The Odesa Zoo has the status of a nature reserve of nationwide value, which was granted in 1992. The collection of the zoo is about 1,600 animals (243 types), a part from which are mentioned in International Red Book, red book of Ukraine and European Red List.

The Odesa Zoo is located in downtown Odesa, opposite Odesa's Pryvoz Market, 25 Novoshepnoy Ryad Street.

== History ==
The first mention of the Odesa Zoo was in 1889 on the city's 100th anniversary when a draft of the plan was first created. Due to delays caused by World War I and the Ukrainian War of Independence, the building of the zoo on Prymorskyi Boulevard did not begin until 1922. In December 1927, three projects were accepted as a zoo building basis. The zoo opened for visitors in 1938. At the zoo housed a unique nursery of rare species of birds of prey and owls of southern Ukraine, where the chicks are prepared to life and later released into the wild nature. For the young nature lovers the zoo regularly hosts thematical festivals, where you can spend your time having fun and advantage. In the zoo every year a lot of pups of rare animals are born. It became possible due to the active work on a complete set of pairs, full feeding and comfortable maintenance pets. In May 2013 Odesa zoo was accepted into the ranks of the Eurasian Regional Association of Zoos and Aquariums.
