= George Gilman Rushby =

Animal hunter in England and South Africa

George Gilman Rushby (1900–1969), was an English elephant hunter, poacher, prospector, farmer, forestry officer, and game warden in Tanzania. Born in England, he was responsible for the hunting down of The Man-eaters of Njombe – a pride of lions that had killed and devoured over 1500 people, reputedly under the influence of a witchdoctor named Matamula Mangeraaa. These events, albeit somewhat fictionalised, were featured in an episode of the BBC docudrama Manhunters. As the Senior Game Ranger of Tanganyika, George Rushby first proposed the Ruaha National Park in 1949. He also helped ensure the park was gazetted in 1951. He died in South Africa in 1969.
