= Gonda =

Gonda may refer to:

== Places ==
=== India ===
- Gonda, Uttar Pradesh, a city in Uttar Pradesh
  - Gonda district
  - Gonda Junction railway station
  - Gonda (Lok Sabha constituency)
  - Gonda Assembly constituency
- Gonda, Aligarh, a town in Aligarh district, Uttar Pradesh
- Gonda, Raebareli, a village in Raebareli district, Uttar Pradesh

=== Elsewhere ===
- Gondā, a village in Iran
- Tang Gonda, a village in Iran
- Gondar, Ethiopia
- Gonda Building of the Mayo Clinic in Rochester, Minnesota

== Name ==
=== Surname ===
- George Gonda (1919–1994), American football player
- Jan Gonda (1905–1991), Dutch orientalist and Indologist
- János Gonda (born 1932), Hungarian jazz pianist
- Ivett Gonda (born 1986), Hungarian-born Canadian taekwondo competitor
- Leslie Gonda (1919–2018), Hungarian-born American businessman
- Louis Gonda (born 1949/1950), American businessman (son of Leslie)
- Michal Gonda (born 1982), Slovak association football player
- Richard Gonda (born 1994), Slovak racing driver
- Shūichi Gonda (born 1989), Japanese association football player
- Yasunosuke Gonda (1887–1951), Japanese sociologist and film theorist

=== Forename ===
- Gonda Van Steen (born 1964), Belgian-American classical scholar and linguist

== Others ==
- Gonda's sign, a clinical sign in medicine
- Gonda (tribe) or Khonds, a tribal people of eastern India, speakers of the Dravidian Kui language (India)

== See also ==
- Gondi (disambiguation)
- Gond (disambiguation)
- Gondia, a city in the state of Maharashtra in Central India
