= Big Five game =

African game-hunting species

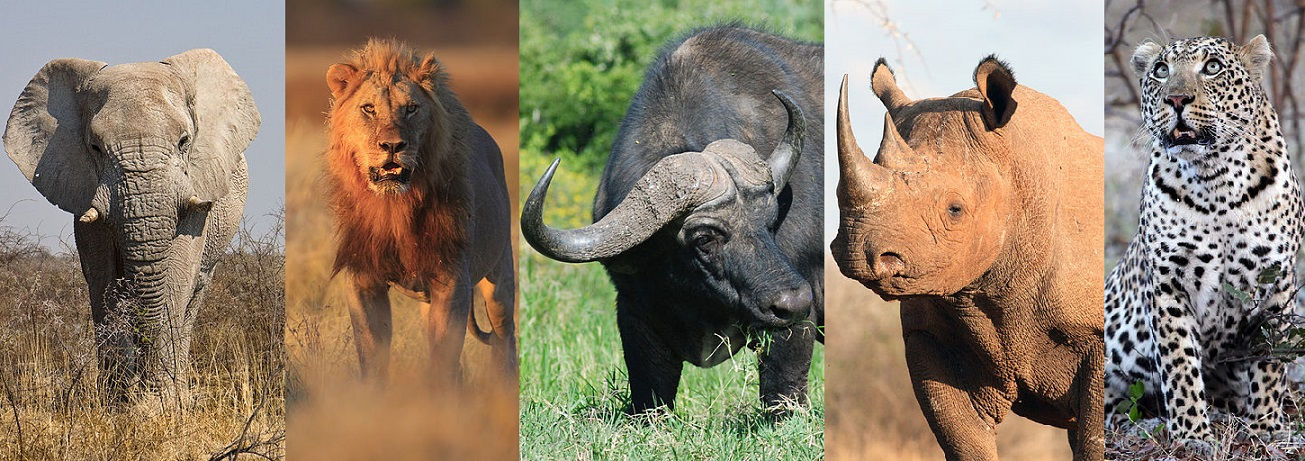
The Big Five

In Africa, the Big Five game animals are the lion, leopard, rhinoceros, elephant, and African buffalo. The term was coined by big-game hunters to refer to the five most difficult animals to hunt on foot. The Big Five has a long hunting history that started at the end of the 19th century during European control of Africa.

Today, the animals are still hunted but are more often targets of ecotourists and safari tour operators. The hunting of Big Five game species can be lucrative for game preserves, presenting opportunities for conservation, however, there are limitations. All Big Five species are examples of charismatic megafauna, featuring prominently in popular culture, and are among the most famous of Africa's large animals.

== Big Five species ==
=== Elephant ===
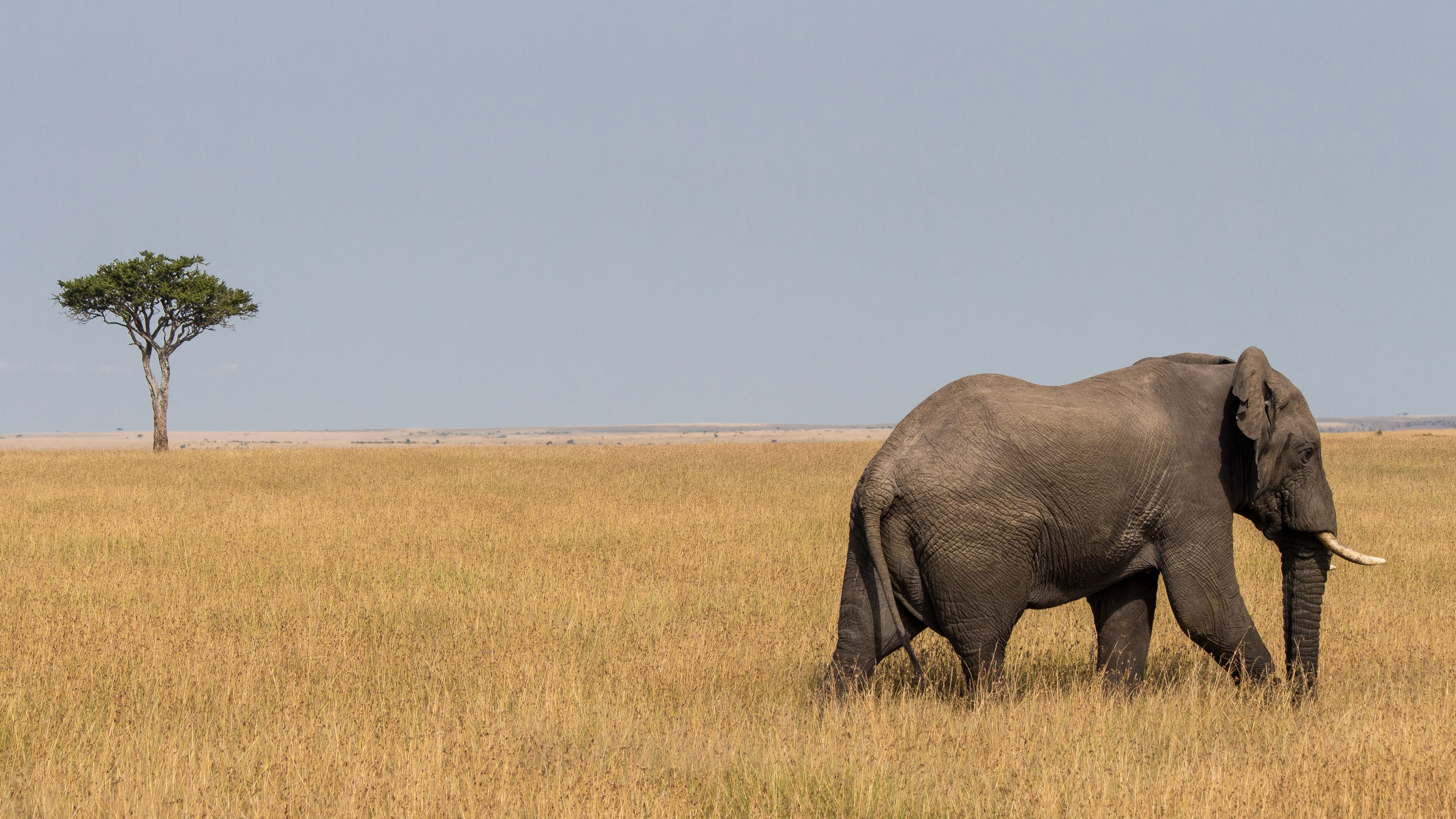
Bull African bush elephant in the Maasai Mara national reserve, Kenya.

The African bush elephant (Loxodonta africana) is the largest extant land animal currently found in 24 African countries and a variety of habitats. As called the African savanna elephant, the species is listed as endangered by the IUCN. Tusks are present on males and females, which are used to make a variety of ivory products and are a prized trophy for hunters.

=== Rhino ===
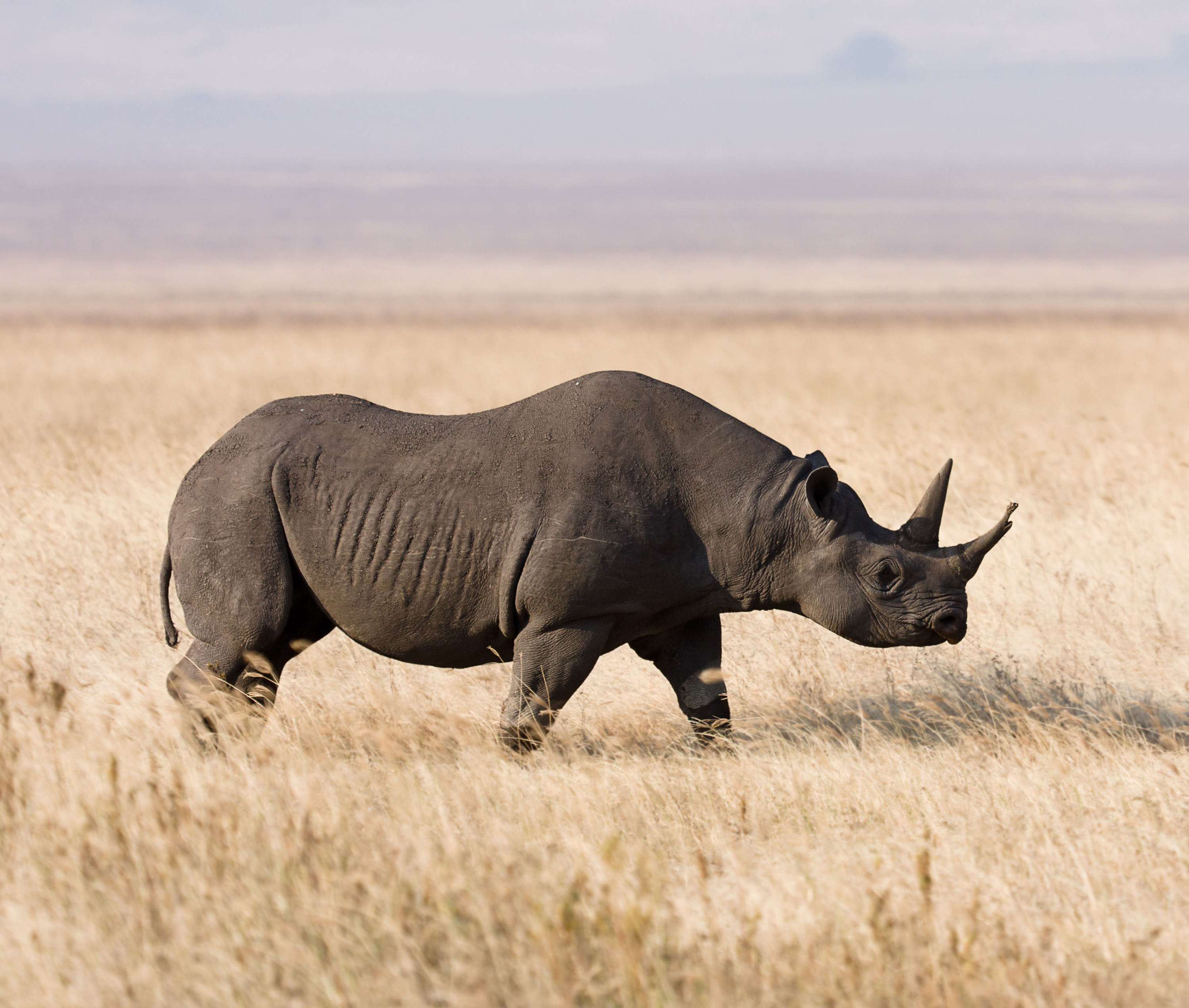
Black rhinoceros in Ngorongoro Conservation Area, Tanzania.

Two species of African rhinoceros are considered part of the Big Five, the white (Ceratotherium simum) and black (Diceros bicornis), each have several subspecies. Both currently exist in several south and eastern African countries in savanna or grassland habitats. The white rhinoceros is listed as near threatened by the IUCN, and the black rhinoceros is considered to be critically endangered. Both species have two keratinized horns, which are desirable as trophies and in traditional Chinese medicine, making them popular targets for trophy hunting.

=== African buffalo ===
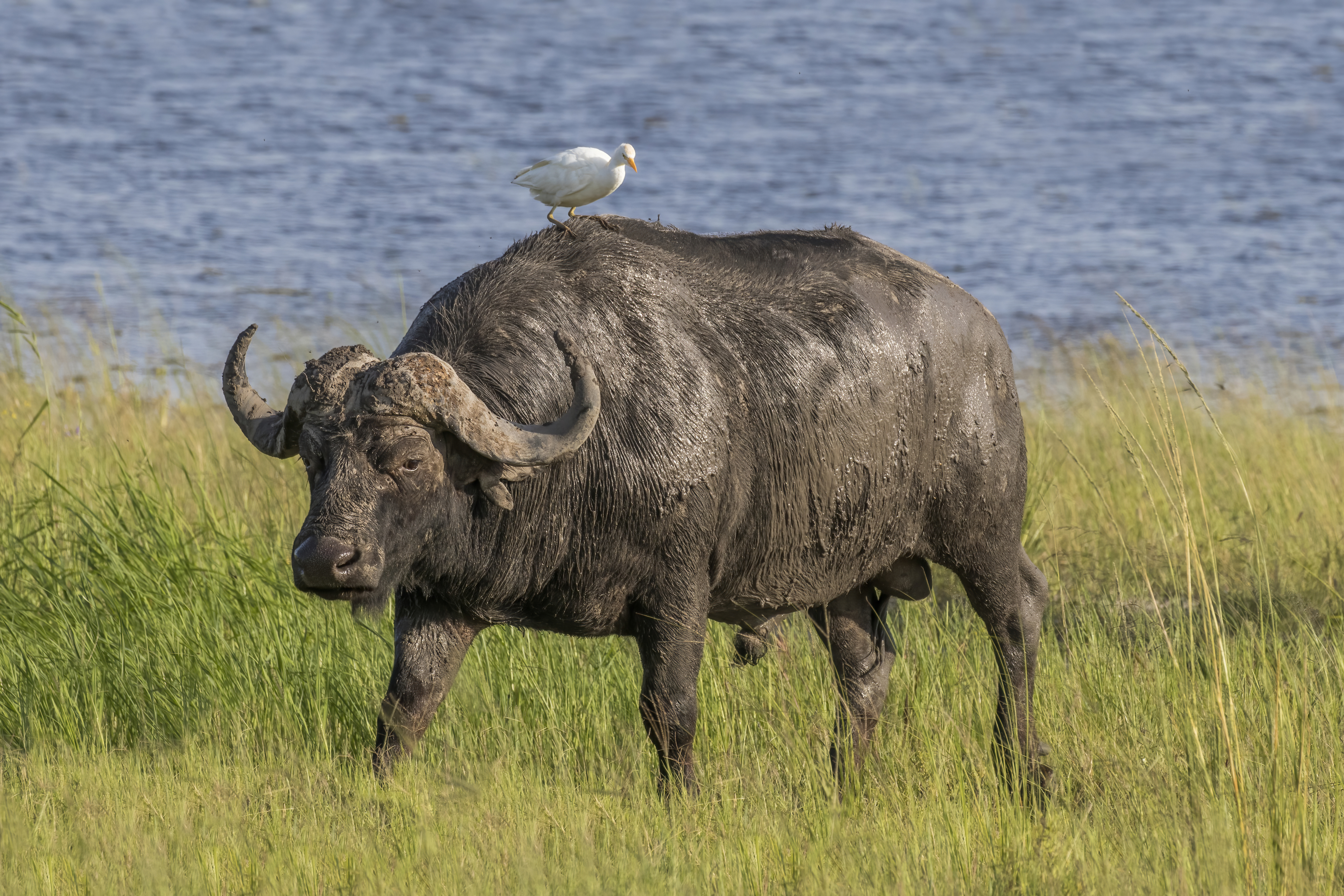
African buffalo bull in Chobe National Park, Botswana.

The African buffalo (Syncerus caffer) is a large horned bovid. There are 4 recognized subspecies found in a variety of habitats in central and southern Africa. The IUCN lists the species as near threatened with a decreasing population. They were typically hunted for food but their broad horns have become a popular trophy for hunters.

=== Leopard ===
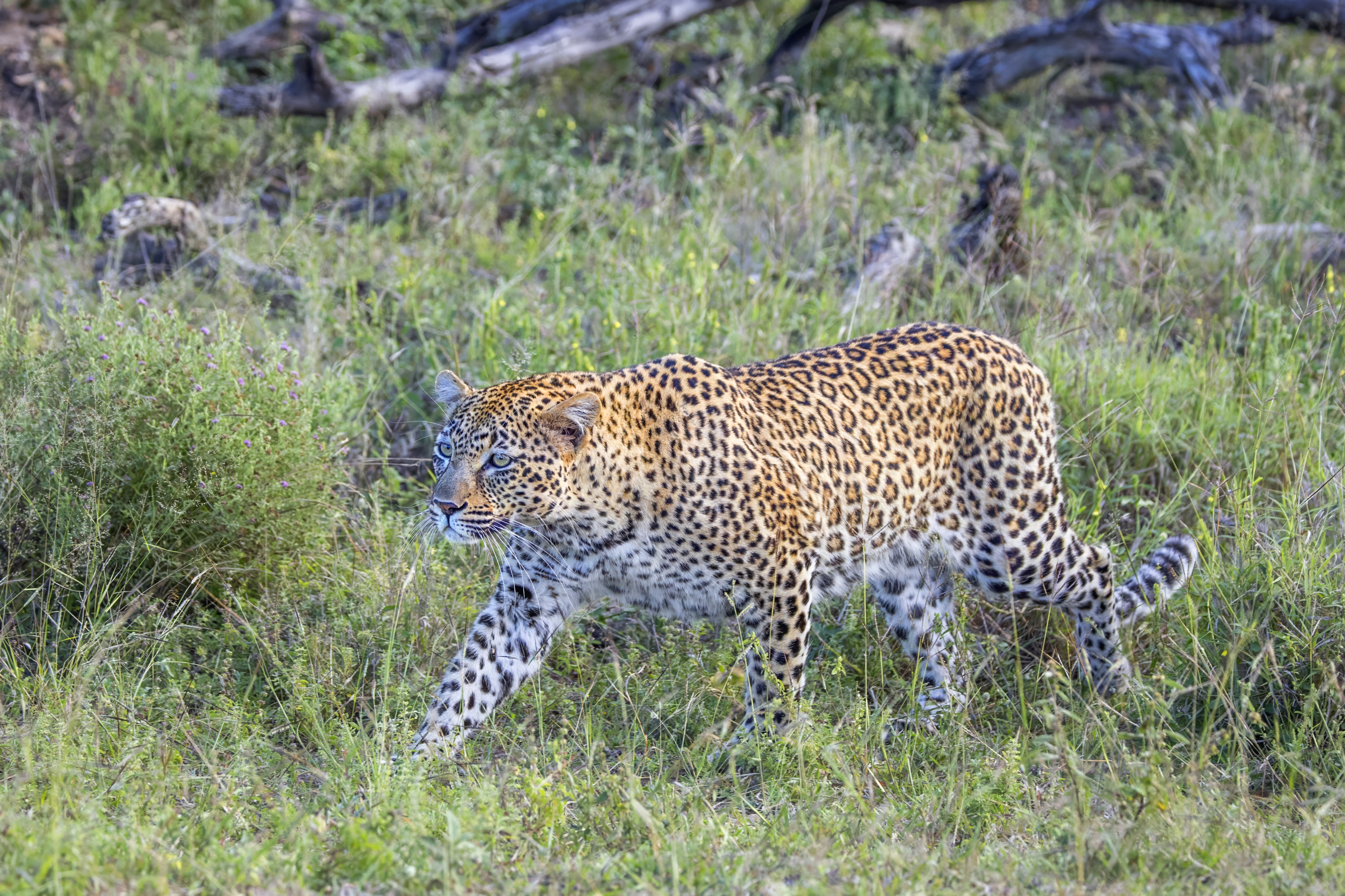
Female leopard in Kruger National Park, South Africa.

The leopard (Panthera pardus) is a large, carnivorous feline which has an expansive range across Africa and Asia. Leopard habitats vary greatly from tropical forests, plains, deserts and mountains. The IUCN lists the species as vulnerable with a decreasing population. Being large carnivores, hunting leopards is desirable due to the perceived danger associated with the species.

=== Lion ===
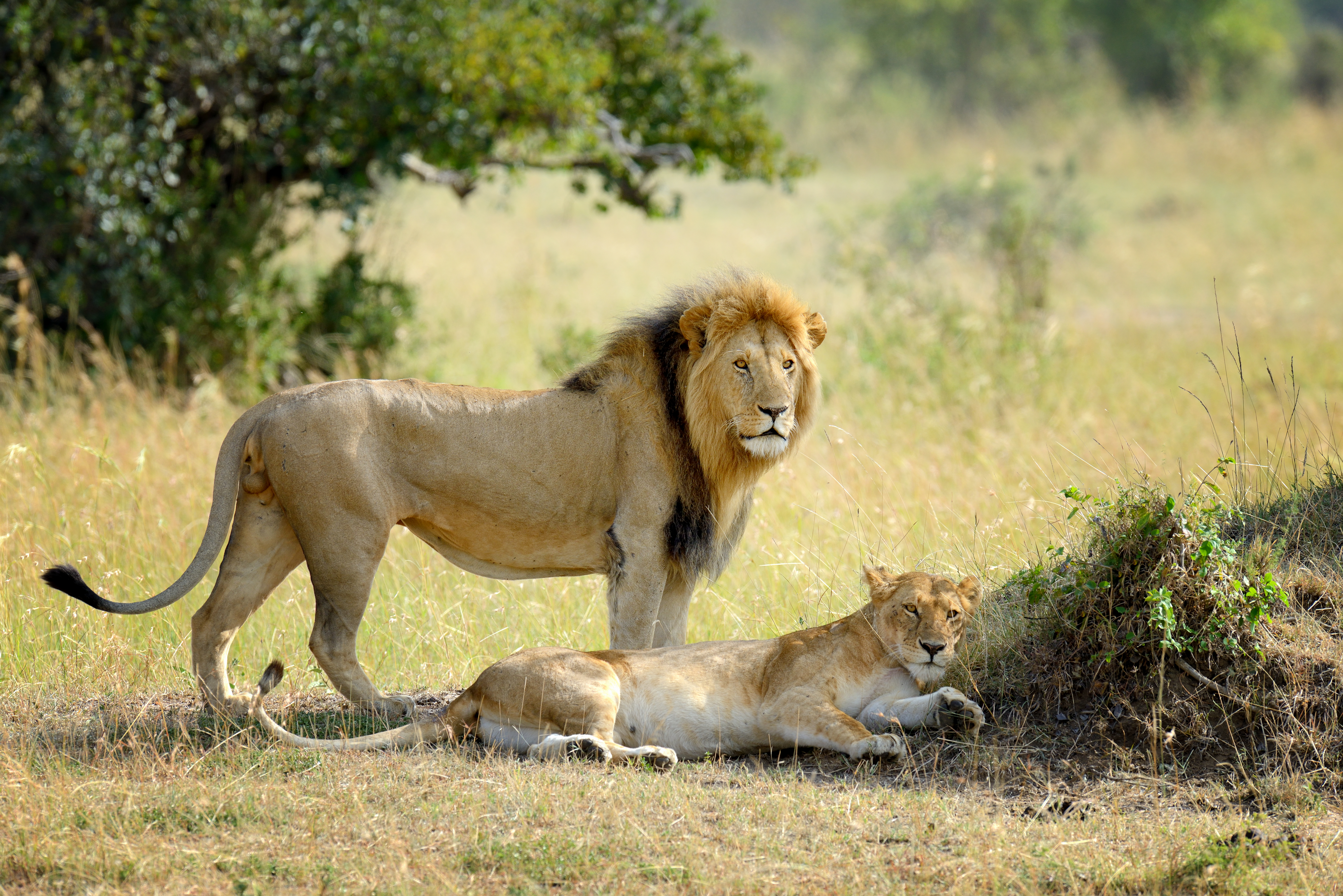
Male and female lion in the Maasai Mara national reserve, Kenya.

The lion (Panthera leo) is a large, carnivorous feline found across Africa, with a small population in the Gir forest of northwestern India. The IUCN lists the species as vulnerable. As a large and charismatic apex predator with cultural significance, lions are among the most popular species to view on safari tours, as desirable for hunters given the perceived danger of hunting a large carnivore.

== Hunting history ==
=== Elephants ===
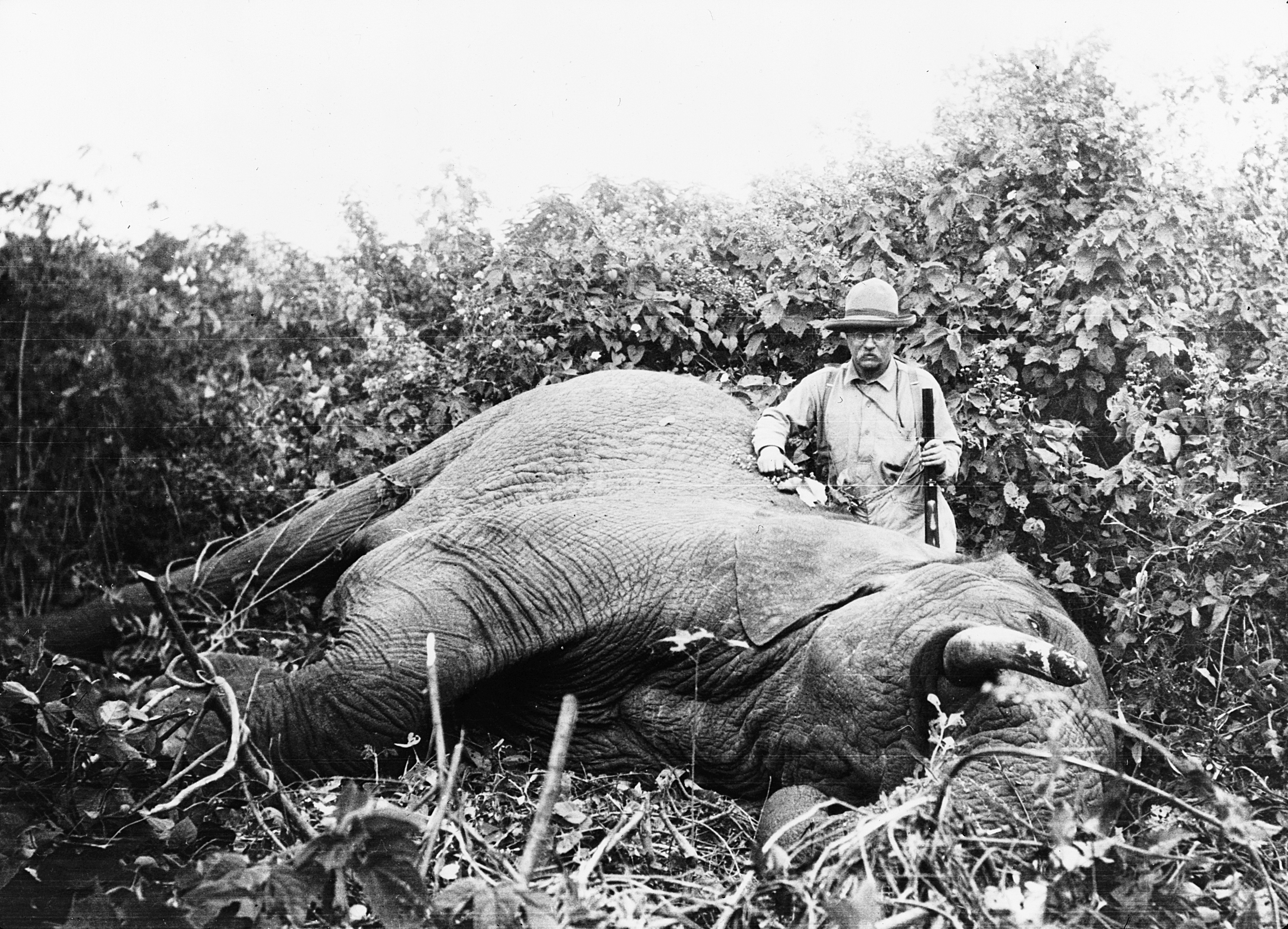
Theodore Roosevelt beside a dead African bush elephant on a trophy hunting trip in Africa, circa 1909 – 1919

Historically, African elephants have been hunted and killed for two main reasons: sport and their ivory (tusks). The hunting of elephants began with European explorers and colonial hunters in the late 19th and early 20th centuries with the rise in popularity of big game hunting in Africa. In the late 1890s, hunters conducted raids in countries like Namibia that caused dramatic decreases to the large elephant populations seen at the time. Locals involved in the industry at this time often traded the tusks for other supplies like food. The rise of more modern guns and hunting methods meant more efficient elephant hunting, leading to it becoming popular continent-wide. The international market for elephant tusk ivory products grew quickly, with a high demand for luxury items such as carved objects or piano keys. This created a lucrative industry that further increased the hunting pressure on elephants.

Moreover, beyond the economic value of hunting elephants, it also held a symbolic importance during the colonial time for hunters. The hunting of elephants was closely related with the expansion of European imperialism and was linked with aspects for hunters such as masculinity, skills as well having dominance over nature which all contributed to its popularity within groups of elite hunters. During the 20th century, elephant populations decreased even further due to the combination of legal hunting as well as the illegal poaching for their ivory.

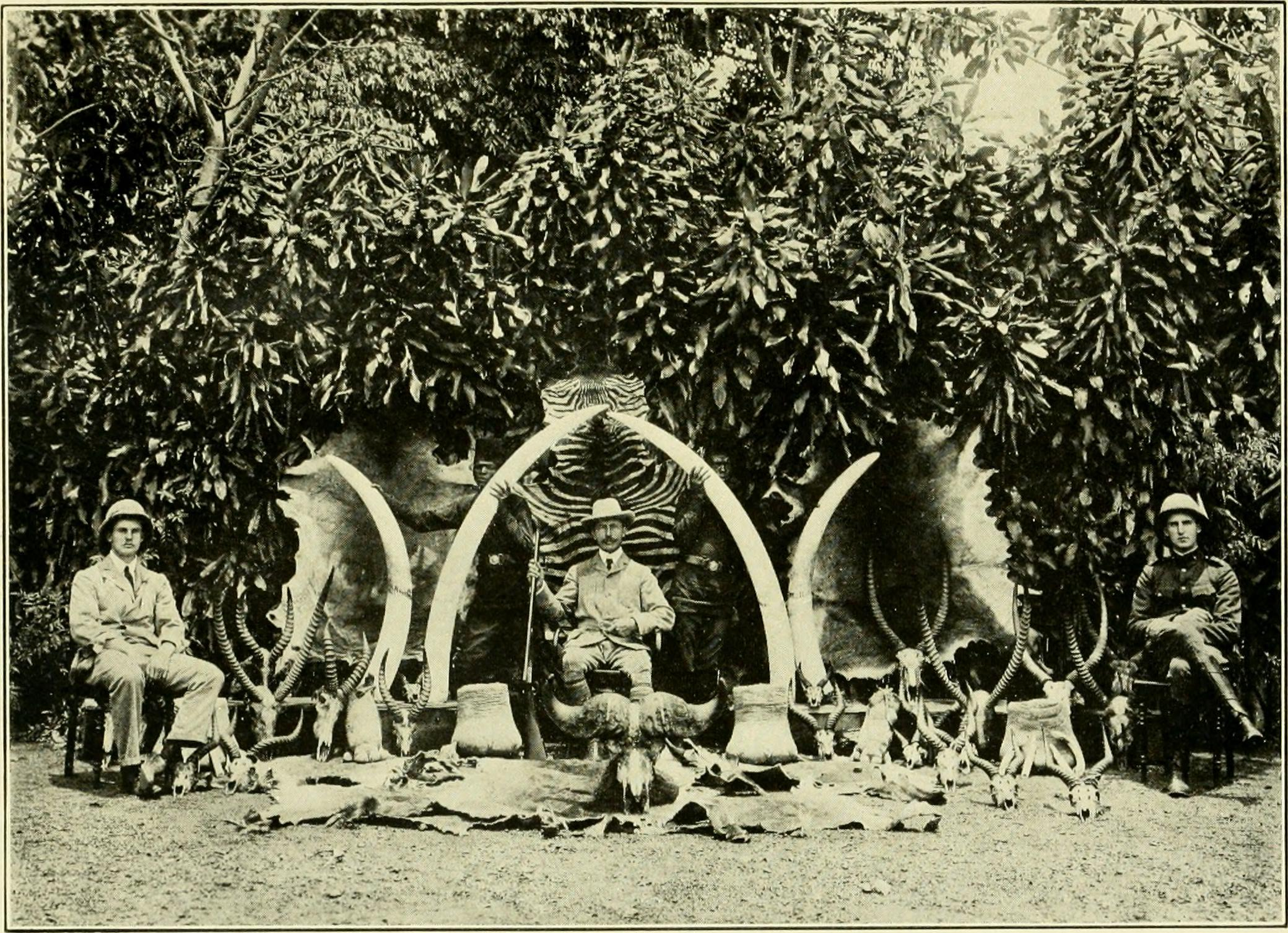
British Governor Sir Henry Bell with hunting trophies in Uganda, 1908

=== Rhinoceros ===
The rhinoceros was once very abundant across the African continent, with populations of around 500 000 animals in the early twentieth century. During expeditions to Southern Africa in the 1830s, large numbers of black rhinoceros were reported, though those expeditions often included hunting the animals as game. Concern over their declining numbers emerged early on, as officials in Kenya were already alarmed by large scale poaching by 1906. By 1932, extinction was considered a serious possibility, with observers reporting that rhinoceros were being killed faster than they could reproduce. By the 1960s, very few numbers of black rhinoceros remained south of the Rivers Zambezi and Kunene. In 2011, the Western black rhinoceros was declared extinct by the IUCN, with poaching being the primary cause.

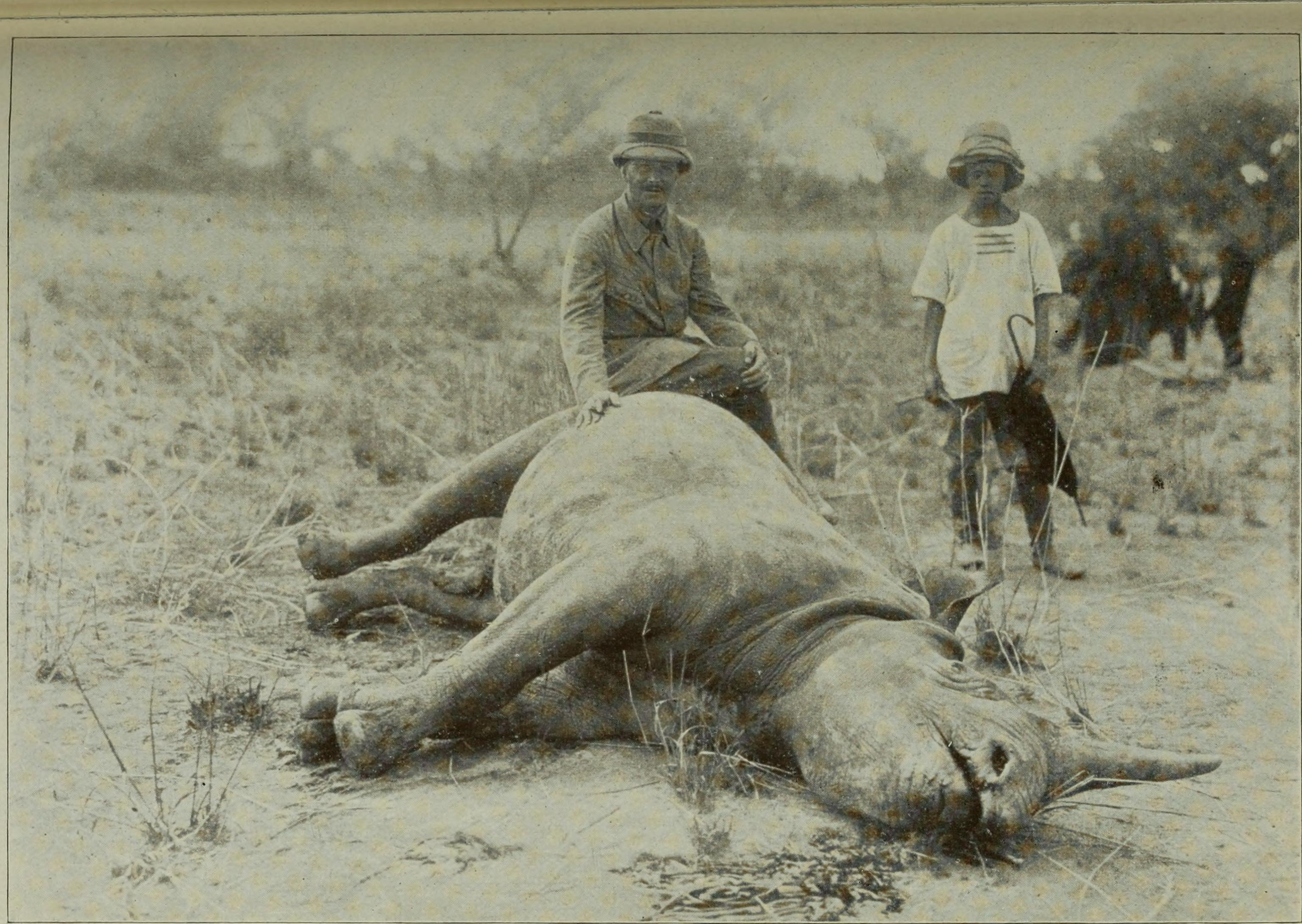
Black rhinoceros killed by the Duke Adolf Friedrich of Mecklenburg during an expedition in Central Africa, 1913

Beyond trophy hunting, rhinoceros have been targeted by poachers due to the high value placed on their horn. The market price has risen from $550 per kilogram in 1979 to $60,000 per kilogram today. Poaching is also driven by illegal trade supplying some Asian Markets, where rhinoceros horn is valued for its perceived medicinal properties. Legal hunting of black and white rhinoceros happens on a small regulated scale in South Africa and Namibia. From the first regulated hunt in 1972 through 2018, 2,538 white rhinoceros were hunted in South Africa and 61 in Namibia. From 2005 to 2018, 47 black rhinoceros were hunted in South Africa and 12 in Namibia. By contrast, 6,087 rhinoceros were recorded as poached in South Africa and Namibia from 2013 to 2017, compared to 423 legally hunted rhinoceros over the same period.

=== African buffalo ===
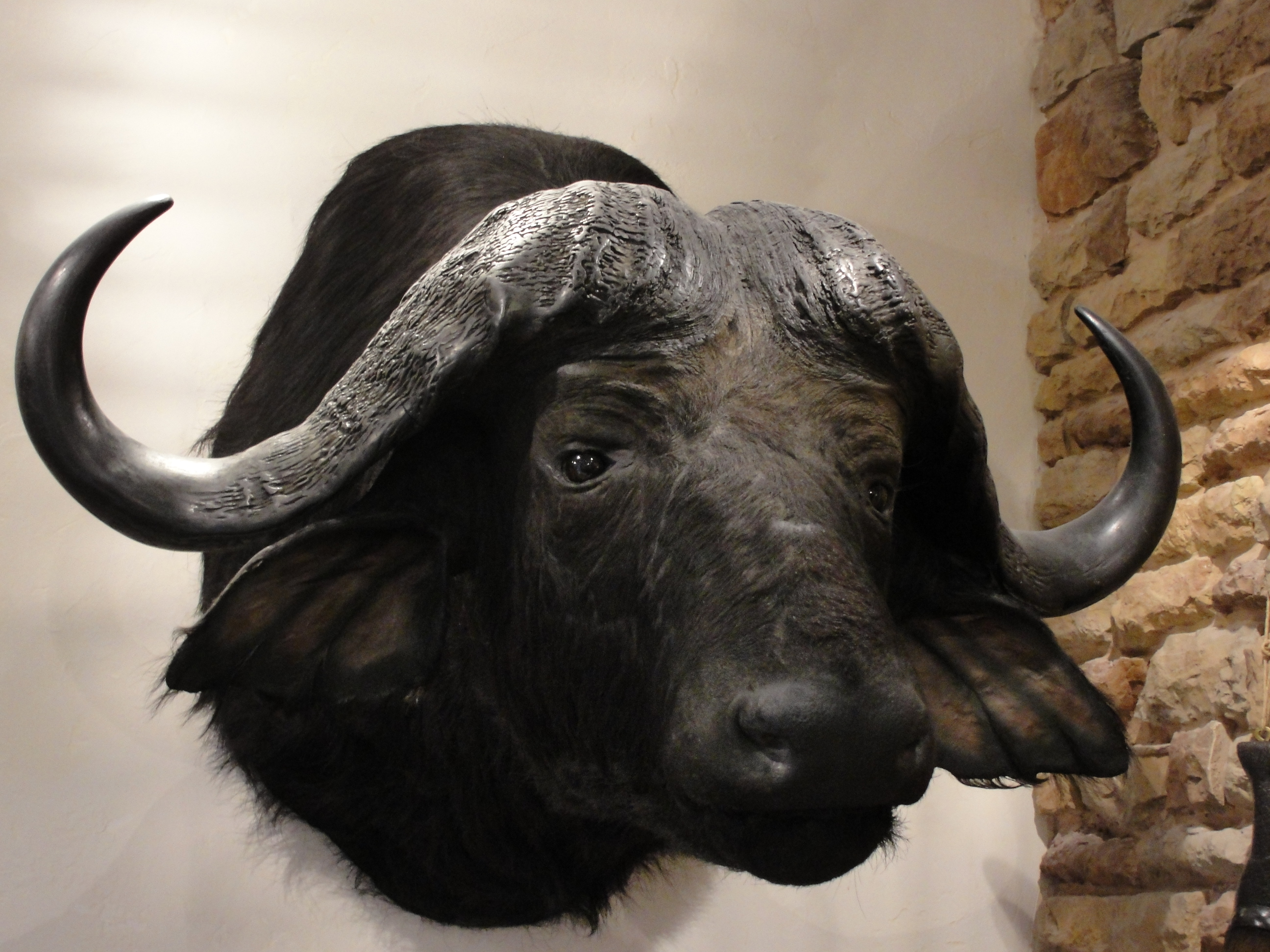
Taxidermied shoulder mount of an African buffalo head.

Throughout history, buffalo were highly valuable game typically hunted by Indigenous communities for food. In the early 1800s, hunting of important game like buffalo in many African countries was tightly controlled by the Indigenous tribes in the area, and these groups imposed strict regulations on visitors in their territory. Leaders and ruling families of these groups were responsible for hunting management and ensuring conservation of commonly hunted animals to prevent population collapse. With the creation of colonies in Africa, foreign countries took over conservation and hunting management, and settlers began to hunt buffalo more aggressively. Settlers also expanded the agriculture and livestock industries in African countries, which led to large areas of land being used for farming and the spread of more zoonotic diseases. One example of this is Rinderpest, or cattle plague, one of the most dangerous diseases for cattle, which killed entire herds throughout many European countries in the 1800s. A Rinderpest outbreak in the 1880s in Africa decimated buffalo populations, and it was thought that the disease was brought to the continent through imported cattle from Europe.

Traditionally, buffalo were not thought to be necessary of protection or conservation because they were so common. However in the late 1800s, hunters started to realize the effects of uncontrolled hunting, and this led to the creation of the first African hunting reserves. For example, Selous Game Reserve was first created in 1896 to preserve the hunting populations of local animals, and was eventually expanded and turned into a reserve sanctuary where hunting quotas are strictly enforced. It now houses the biggest population of African buffalo in the world. Today, the African buffalo are hunted much less for food but continue to be hunted for their horns, which are popular trophies for hunters. 4200 buffalo trophies were imported into the USA from 2005-2015 from several African countries such as Swaziland and South Africa.

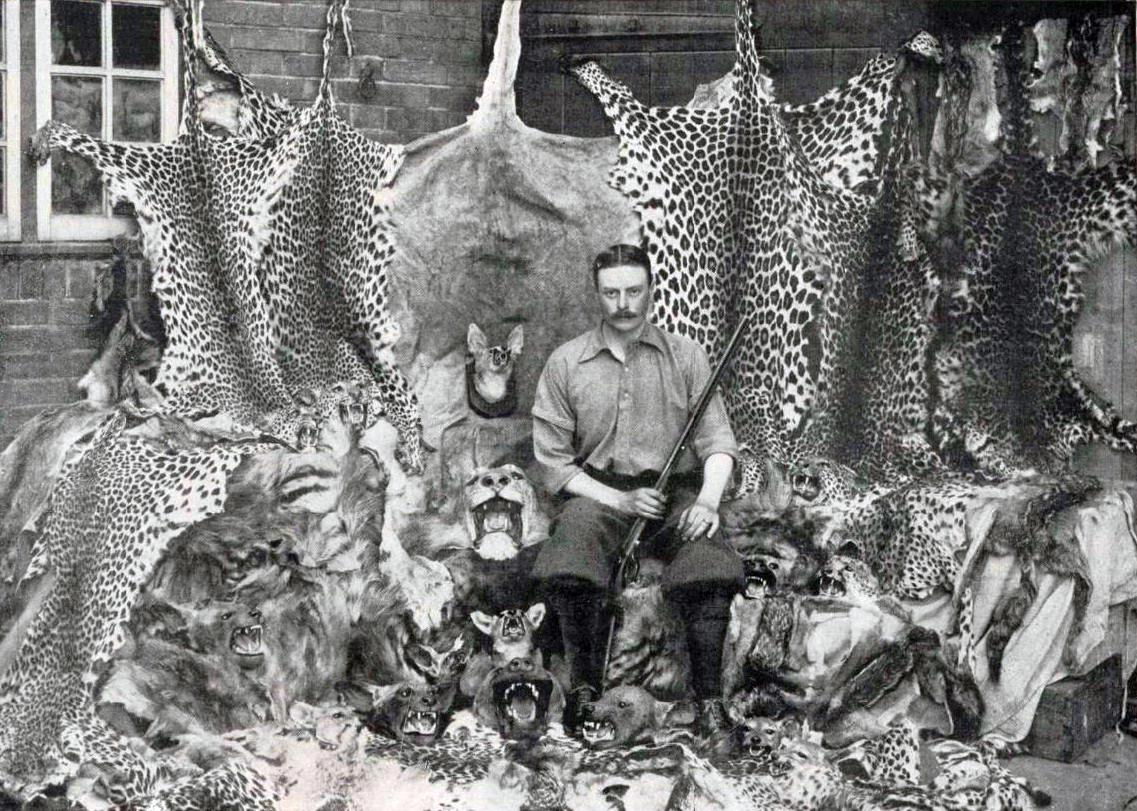
Hunter displaying their hunting trophies (multiple leopard skins), Somaliland, 1899

=== Leopard ===
Leopards have been commonly hunted for fur and for use in traditional medicines and other practices. Their bones, teeth, claws and fat have been used in traditional African medicines and religious ceremonies.

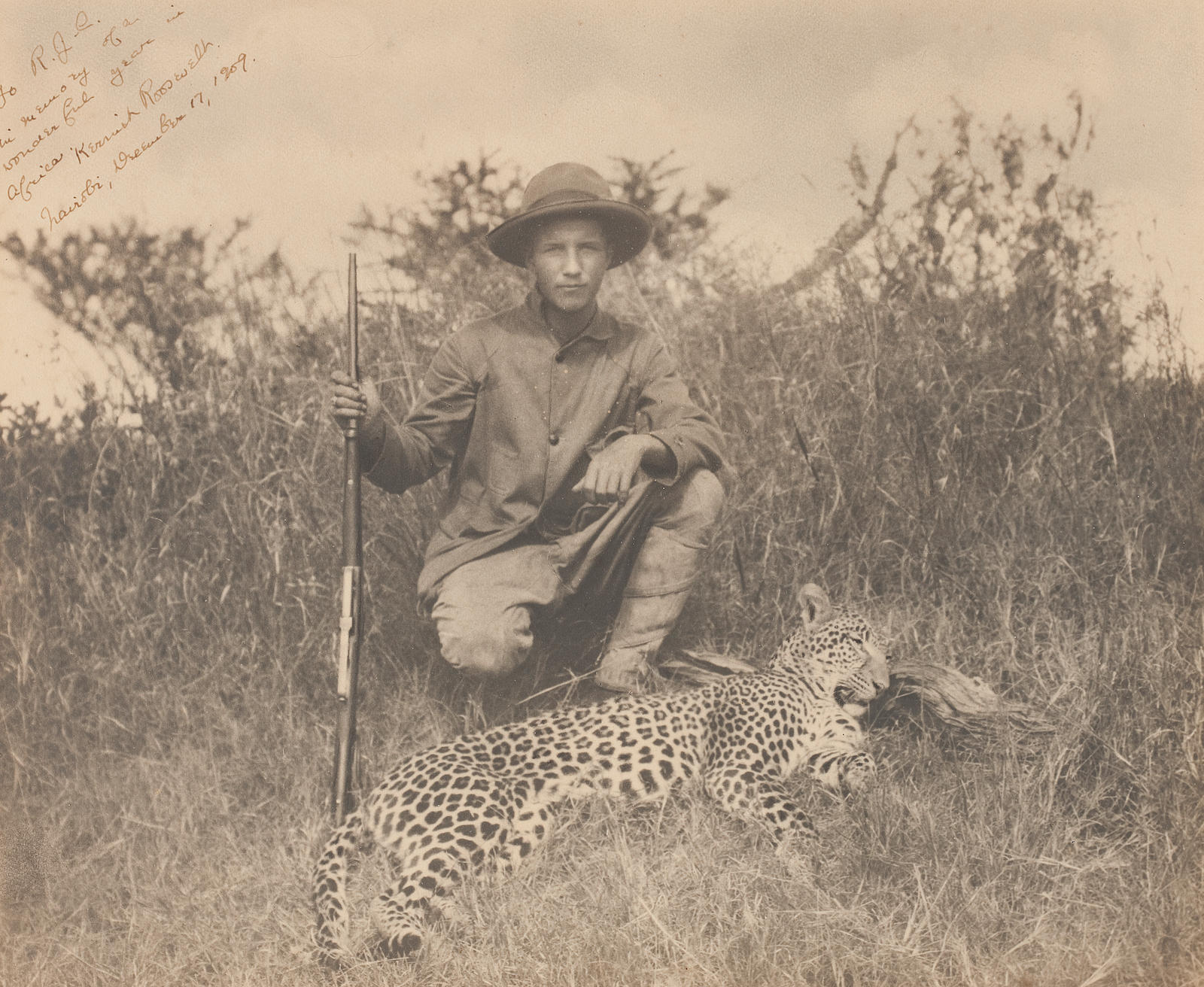
Kermit Roosevelt after hunting and killing a leopard in Nairobi, 1909

The big cats have also been killed due to their infrequent attacks on people and livestock. During the colonial era they were hunted by professional hunters such as Jim Corbett and Kenneth Anderson in India. This history of conflict has influenced the hunting of the species and many leopards have been killed due to the assumed threat they pose to villages and livestock. Between, 1920-1922, 133 leopards were culled in South Africa, and more recently, 120 leopard trophies were exported from South Africa per year between 2004 and 2006. The effects of trophy hunting on leopard populations is still uncertain, leopards currently make up about 8-20% of trophy hunting revenue in eastern and southern Africa. Hunting of coexisting lions have resulted in a mesopredator release, where the lions are the apex predators and the leopards are the mesopredators, which has likely masked the detrimental effects of trophy hunting.

Leopards now occupy only about 37% of their native African range, with some estimates as low as 25%. This range reduction is well above average for large carnivores worldwide (63-75% loss compared to an average of about 53% for other predators) and is in part due to hunting, as well as environmental effects like habitat loss. 12 African countries are still allowed to export leopard skins with quotas set by the Convention for the International Trade of Endangered Species (CITES). Tanzania is currently the most popular country for leopard sport hunting and has one of the highest quotas for exporting leopard trophies, they export an average of 303 per year.

=== Lions ===
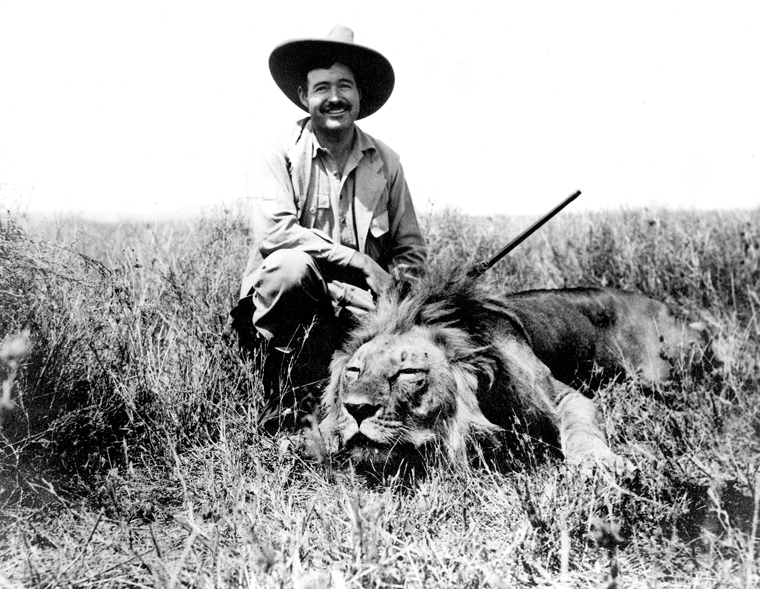
Ernest Hemingway after killing a lion in Africa, 1934

Historically, lions have been a target of the colonial era big-game hunting in Africa; dating back to the late 19th century and continuing into the early 20th century. Lions were hunted by many British and European hunters who sought to hunt "dangerous" animals, and viewed lions as a symbol of courage and prestige. Accounts from early safaris describe lion hunting as one of the greatest achievements for hunters.

As with the leopards, lions were also killed due to the threat they could potentially pose to humans and livestock. One of the most famous examples of this being the two man-eating lions of Tsavo, who were hunted and killed by John Henry Patterson after killing and eating an estimated 35 people in 1898. However, this behaviour is considered rare.

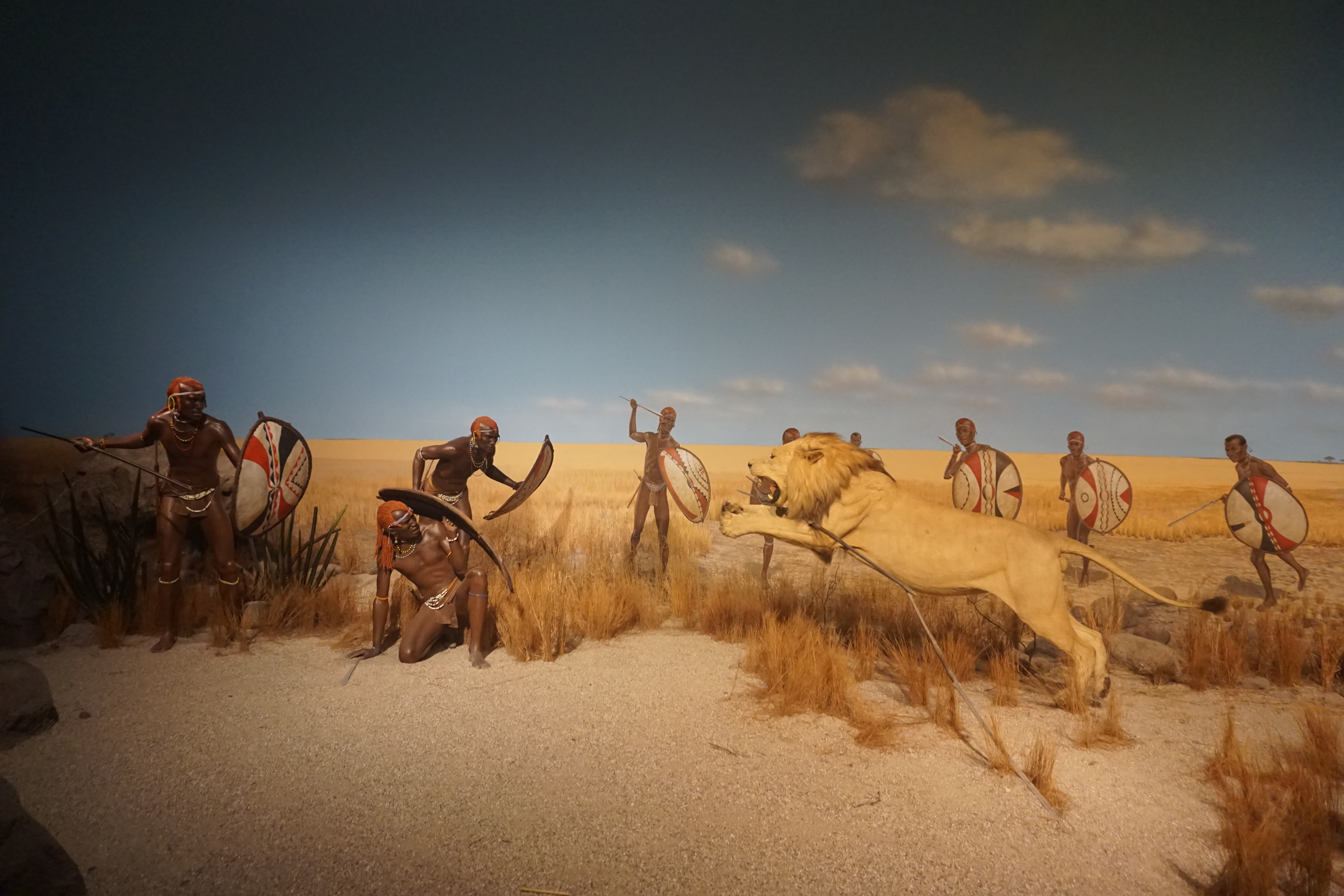
Diorama/Situational Exhibit of Lion hunting by local populations at Milwaukee Public Museum

Lion hunting is still practiced today in various parts of Africa under regulated trophy hunting practices. In many countries, this includes regulated hunting quotas to monitor the number of lions harvested. However, there has been much debate on whether lion hunting can be sustainable in many areas of Africa, particularly where little or no data exists regarding lion populations and management. Research suggests that poor regulation of lion hunting may result in population decline at the local level, particularly if male lions of reproductive age are being hunted in large numbers. Tanzania is also the country with the highest occurrence of lion trophy hunting, they exported 243 lion trophies on average per year from 1996-2006. Historically, the killing of a lion by the Maasai people has been viewed as a rite of passage. Historically, lion hunts were done by individuals, however, due to reduced lion populations, lion hunts done solo are discouraged by elders. Most hunts are now partaken by groups of 10 warriors. Group hunting, known in Maasai as olamayio, gives the lion population a chance to grow. However, in Kenya, where this practice is illegal, olamayio may be used as a reason for retaliatory killing against lions suspected of killing livestock.

== Cultural impact ==
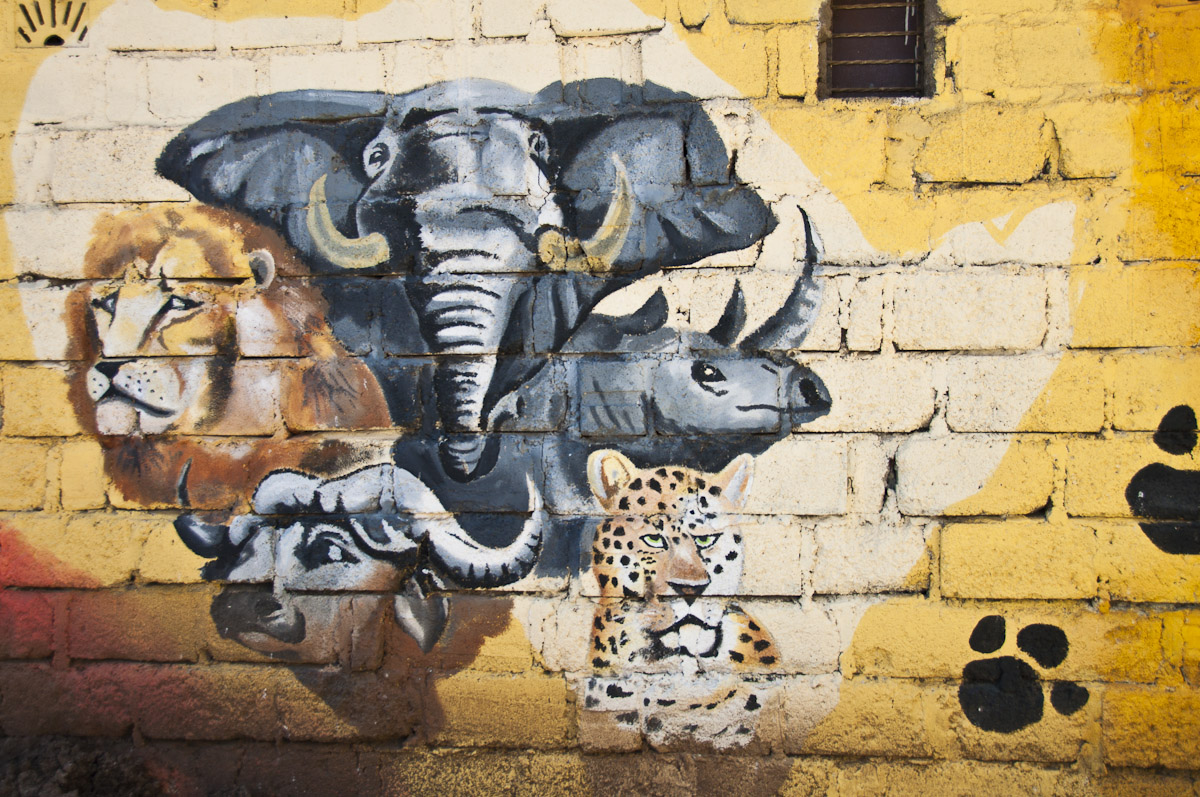
The Big Five in art, 2011, Nanyuki

The Big Five have held cultural significance across time and cultures worldwide. They are some of the most frequently seen animals in cave paintings, showing that they have had a big impact on Indigenous African communities for centuries. The Maasai people of Kenya and Tanzania consider elephants to be similar to humans in some ways, recognizing them as Arkanjowe, beings who are big or powerful.

The rhinoceros held cultural significance among the Bantu speakers of Southern Africa, where it served as an emblem of leadership. The Golden Rhinoceros of Mapungubwe figurine (1220-1300) was widely interpreted as a symbol of sacred royal power in southern Africa' earliest known state. The honorific title "rhinoceros horn" was used to address Venda chiefs in royal court speech.

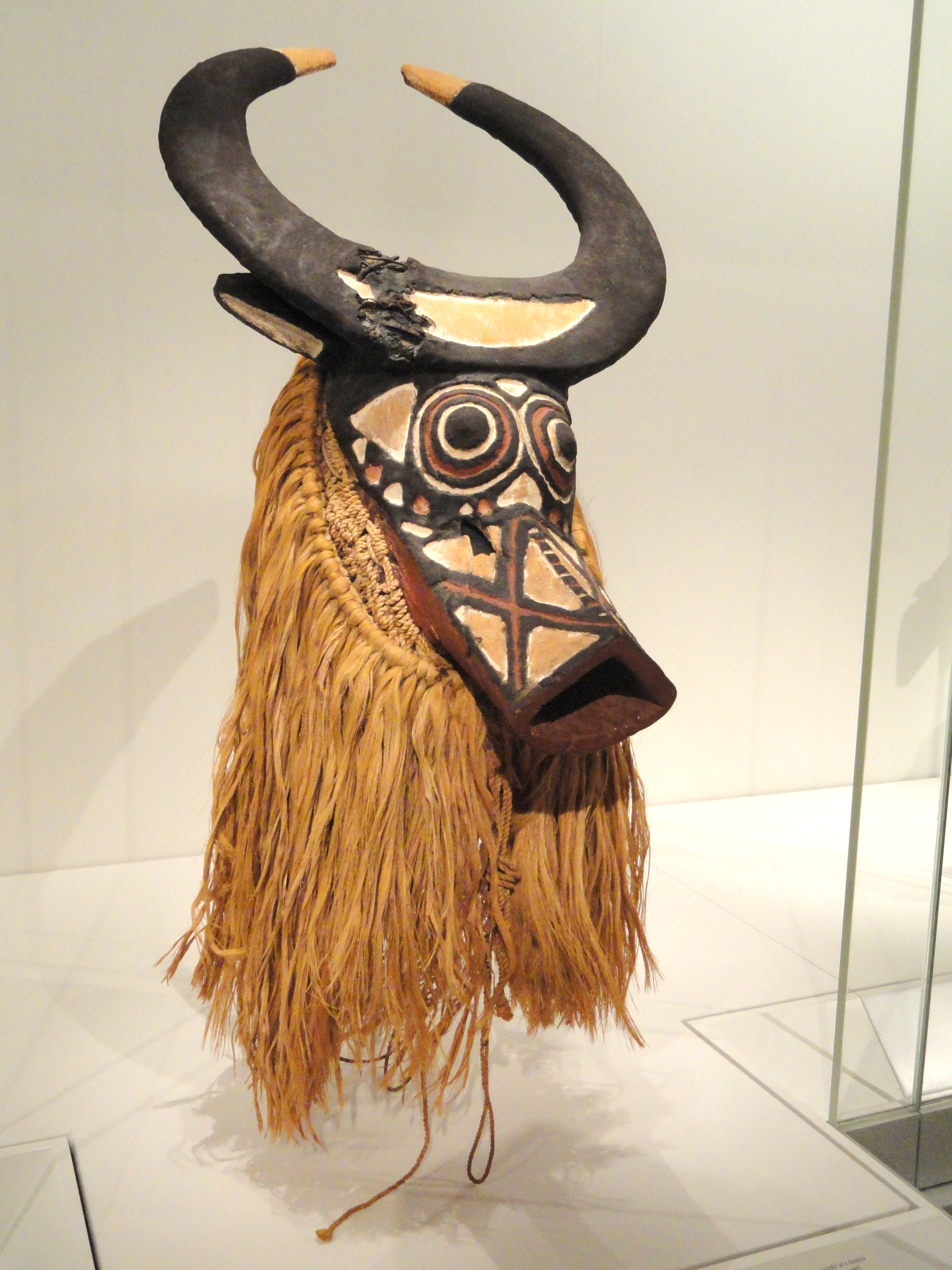
Bush buffalo mask from Western Sudan, early to mid 1900s

The African buffalo is recognized across several ethnic groups including the Shona, Tsonga, Sotho, and Venda as a sacred totem, with prohibitions against killing or consuming it. The Bisa people of Zambia attribute strength and danger to the buffalo, and consider it to have a strong spiritual force. Across West Africa, masks representing buffalos feature in ceremonies and ritual dances, symbolizing the transition between the wild and human worlds.

Across African kingdoms, both the leopard and the lion were associated with royalty and political power. Traditionally, only kings were allowed to keep the skins or teeth, as they were highly regarded. They were often used as a part of ceremonial regalia in several countries, originally only worn by royalty but leopard and lion skin garments have become more common in recent decades for people, mostly men, of all classes to be worn during religious gatherings. The founder of the Mali Empire, Sundiata Keita was known as Mari-Jata, meaning the Lion of Mali. In Dahomey, the founder of the royal lineage was said to be descended from a leopard. Among the Yoruba, "son of leopard" was a name used for kings. The leopard also featured prominently in bronze art within the Benin Empire. There have been recent initiatives to create faux fur leopard skin garments in several of these communities to limit the hunting of real leopards while also allowing them to continue their traditional practices.

All of the Big Five animals are now well-known world wide. Their popularity has led organizations like the IUCN to create "Big Five" lists for other countries and continents. With nature-based tourism rising in popularity in recent decades, the Big Five animals constitute a major tourist attraction in African countries. Kruger National Park, South Africa's first and most popular national park, sees more than one million visitors every year and supports up to 600,000 people living near it. Research suggests that seeing these five species is a significant reason why tourists choose to visit this park.

== Use of trophy hunting in conservation ==
While trophy hunting has negatively impacted species population numbers in the past, it is presently being used to enhance conservation efforts for these important species in many African countries. Money generated from trophy hunting and the tourists it attracts can also be used to support conservation projects and encourage the hunters to care more about the longterm survival of these species. However, the use of trophy hunting to support conservation is a controversial topic and has been debated in scientific literature. Critics argue that the practice is rooted in an anthropocentric western colonial perspective, which cannot be excused and should not be a facet of conservation in any way. Other critics have acknowledged that the practice can generate funding for conservation, but highlight its negative effects on species and communities through trophic cascades, and changes in natural selection due to the targeting of individuals with impressive "trophies".

On the other hand, experts have argued that trophy hunting confers benefits to conservation because it preserves core habitat, and produces fewer carbon emissions than ecotourism. Furthermore, it has been proposed that the shortcomings of trophy hunting come from corruption in the institutes around it. Another supporting aspect is the opinions of local people. Overall opinions of trophy hunting are favourable, people living on communal lands where trophy hunting is practiced through community based conservation confer benefits from it through monetary income and meat. Allowing trophy hunting has also increased the overall tolerance for large predators like leopards and lions near villages and farms, therefore less predators are killed for their perceived threat. An example of this is in Kenya, where community members were more tolerant of large predators if they could derive income from trophy hunting.

== See also ==
- Charismatic megafauna
- Elephant gun
- Hunting
- Game (hunting)
- Big-game hunting
