= Gondwana (disambiguation) =

Gondwana was a supercontinent also known as Gondwanaland.

Gondwana or Gondwanaland may also refer to:

- Gondwana (India) also known as Gondaranya, region of central India inhabited by the Gond tribe, namesake of the continent
- Gondwana Game Reserve, a game reserve in the Western Cape of South Africa
- Gondwana Rainforests, subtropical rainforest in Australia
- Gondwana (band), Chilean reggae group
- Gondwanaland (Australian band), Australian world music band
- Gondwanaland (Gondwanaland album)
- Gondwanaland (Steroid Maximus album)
- Gondwana (Murail), musical composition by Tristan Murail
- "Gondwana", the title of one half of a 1975 live concert recording by Miles Davis from the album Pangaea
- Polygondwanaland, the twelfth studio album by King Gizzard & the Lizard Wizard
- Gondwana-1, a submarine communications cable between Australia and New Caledonia
- Gondwana Choirs, an Australian National Children's Choir
- MV Gondwana, a 1975 ship that belonged to Greenpeace
- Gondwana Records, a music record label

== See also ==
- Gond (disambiguation)
- Gondi (disambiguation)
