= Gondwana Game Reserve =

Game reserve in the Western Cape, South Africa

Coordinates: 34°04′52″S 21°54′41″E

Gondwana Private Game Reserve is a game reserve situated in the Garden Route of South Africa, near the town of Mossel Bay in the Western Cape. It was the first private game reserve to be developed along the southernmost coast of South Africa with the explicit intent of rewilding the wilderness and wildlife that previously thrived in the region prior to European colonization.

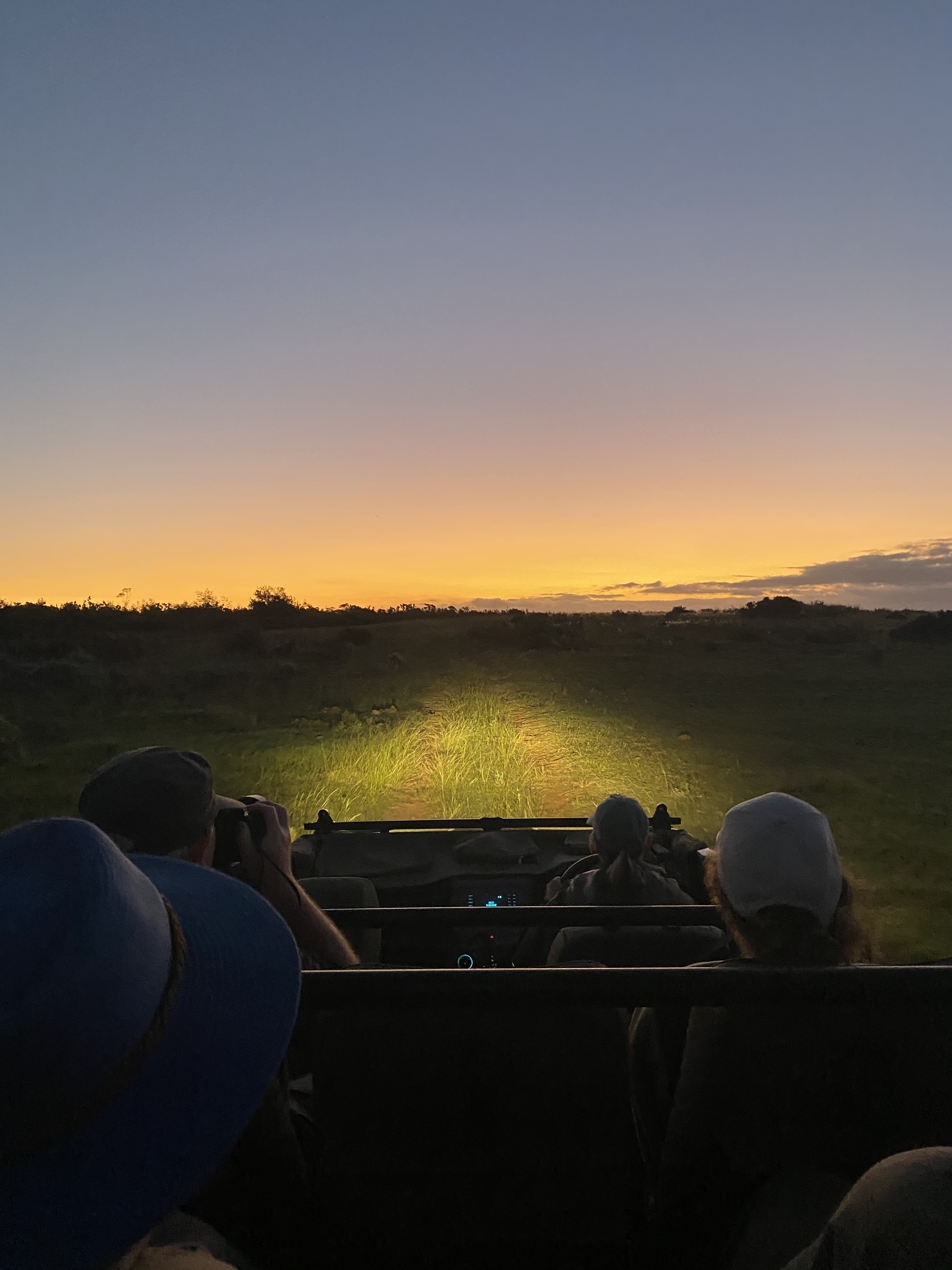
A night drive at Gondwana Game Reserve

== Fauna ==
The reserve hosts endangered species such as the Cape mountain zebra, Barbary lion and south-central black rhinoceros. Many species of antelope, including eland, gemsbok, red hartebeest, bontebok and springbok can be found on the reserve, following their reintroduction to the area, which was formerly farmland. As part of continued conservation efforts, wild South African cheetahs were relocated from a reserve in Karoo to the Gondwana Game Reserve. In addition to the free-roaming Big 5, the reserve is home to over 10 varieties of antelope (more than the Kruger National Park), and hundreds of head of general game.

== Location ==
Gondwana Game Reserve is an 11,000-hectare private game reserve. The reserve is within the viewing distance of the Langeberg and Outeniqua Mountains and is 28.9 km from Mossel Bay.

== Activities ==
Available activities include Big 5 Game Drives, Mountain Biking, Hikes, Africology spa treatments, and the Junior Ranger program.

== See also ==
- Game reserve
