= Gondi =

Gondi may refer to:

- Gondi people, an ethnic group of central India
- Gondi language, the Dravidian language of the Gondi people
  - Gondi writing, scripts used to write the language
- Gondi (food), a traditional Iranian Jewish food
- Gondi, Zanjan, a village in Zanjan Province, Iran
- Gondi (film), a 2020 Bangladeshi romantic comedy
- The de Gondi family, a French aristocratic family
  - Jean François Paul de Gondi, cardinal de Retz

== See also ==
- Gond (disambiguation)
- Gondwana (disambiguation)
- Gonda (disambiguation)
- Gondia, a city in the state of Maharashtra in Central India
- Gandhi (disambiguation)
  - Mahatma Gandhi (1869–1948), Indian reformer and civil rights leader
