= Mesopredator release hypothesis =

Ecological theory

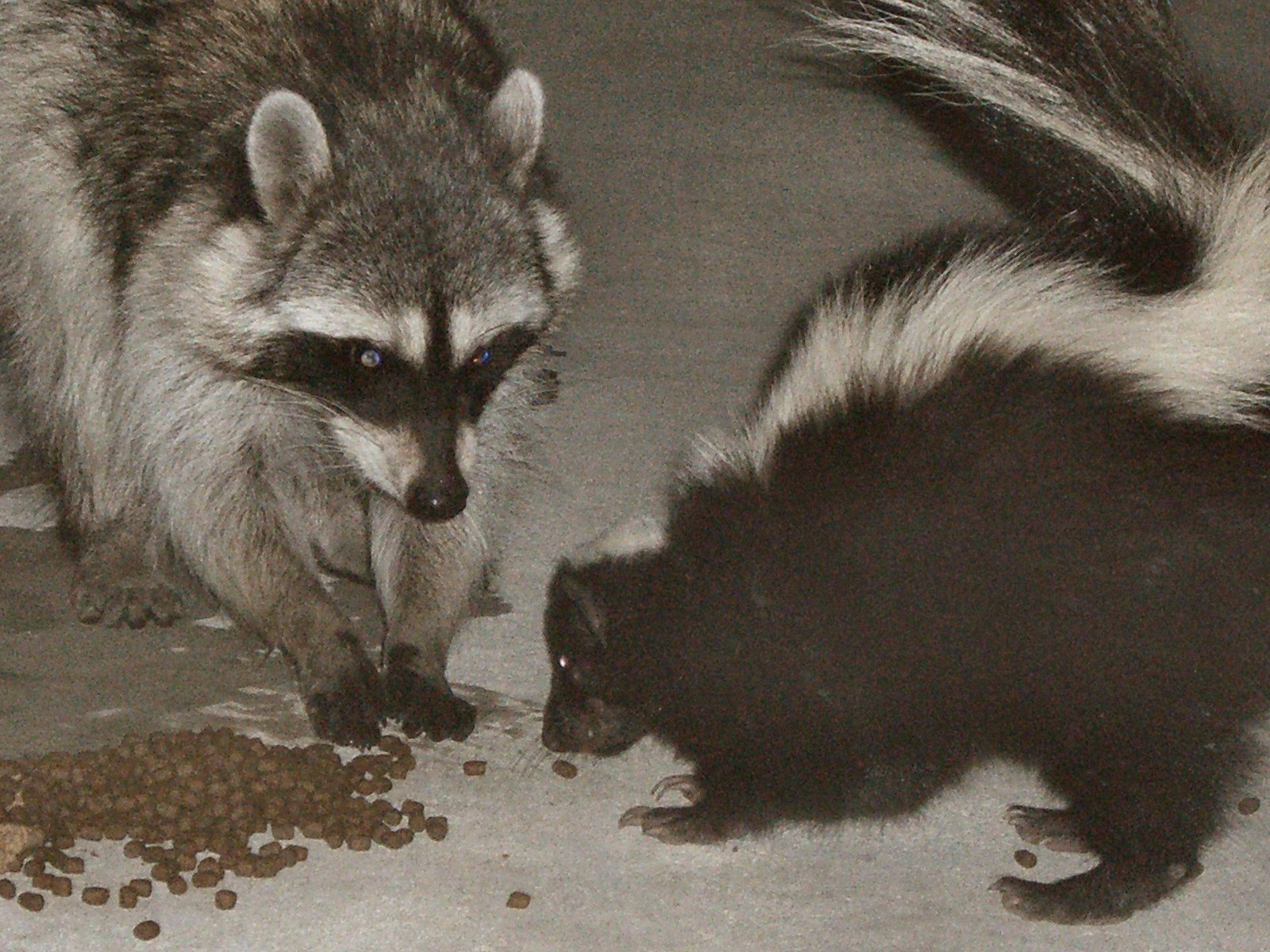
Raccoons (Procyon lotor) and skunks (Mephitis mephitis) are mesopredators. Here they share cat food in a suburban backyard.

The mesopredator release hypothesis is an ecological theory used to describe the interrelated population dynamics between apex predators and mesopredators within an ecosystem, such that a collapsing population of the former results in dramatically increased populations of the latter. This hypothesis describes the phenomenon of trophic cascade in specific terrestrial communities.

A mesopredator is a medium-sized, middle trophic level predator, which both preys and is preyed upon. Examples are raccoons, skunks, snakes, cownose rays, and small sharks.

== The hypothesis ==
The term "mesopredator release" was first used by Soulé and colleagues in 1988 to describe a process whereby mid-sized carnivorous mammals became far more abundant after being "released" from the control of a larger carnivore. This, in turn, resulted in decreased populations of still smaller prey species, such as birds. This may lead to dramatic prey population decline, or even extinction, especially on islands. This process arises when mammalian top predators are considered to be the most influential factor on trophic structure and biodiversity in terrestrial ecosystems. Top predators may feed on herbivores and kill predators in lower trophic levels as well. Thus, reduction in the abundance of top predators may cause the medium-sized predator population to increase, therefore having a negative effect on the underlying prey community. The mesopredator release hypothesis offers an explanation for the abnormally high numbers of mesopredators and the decline in prey abundance and diversity. The hypothesis supports the argument for conservation of top predators because they protect smaller prey species that are in danger of extinction. This argument has been a subject of interest within conservation biology for years, but few studies have adequately documented the phenomenon.

== Criticism ==
One of the main criticisms of the mesopredator release hypothesis is that it argues in favor of the top-down control concept and excludes the possible impacts that bottom-up control could have on higher trophic levels. This means that it supports the argument that top predators control the structure and population dynamics of an ecosystem, but it does not take into account that prey species and primary producers also have an effect on the ecosystem's structure. Furthermore, populations of smaller predators do not always increase after the removal of top predators; in fact, they sometimes decline sharply. Another problem is that the hypothesis is offered as an explanation after large predators have already become rare or extinct in an ecosystem. Consequently, there is no data on the past ecosystem structure and the hypothesis cannot be tested. As a result, information on the past conditions has been inferred from studies of the present conditions. However, contemporary examples of mesopredator release exist, such as the culling of cats on Macquarie Island.

The hypothesis is sometimes also applied to humans as apex predators that produce top-down effects on lower trophic levels. However, it fails to recognize bottom-up effects that anthropogenic land transformations can have on landscapes on which primary producers, prey species, and mesopredators dwell. Possible bottom-up effects on an ecosystem can be from bioclimatic impacts on ecosystem productivity and from anthropogenic habitat alterations. Examples of anthropogenic habitat change include agriculture, grazing land, and urbanization. More importantly, the hypothesis does not take into account that higher trophic levels are affected by primary productivity. It also does not mention that trophic interactions operate at different strengths according to the ecosystem. Therefore, the roles of predation and food/nutrient processes in influencing ecosystem structures remain open to controversy and further testing.

== Other release hypotheses ==
The mesopredator release hypothesis has also inspired other "release hypotheses". For example, the "mesoscavenger release hypothesis", which proposes that when large, efficient, scavenger populations decline (such as vultures), small, less efficient, mesoscavenger populations increase (such as rats). However, this type of release is different. In the mesoscavenger release hypothesis, mesoscavengers are being released from competition for food, whereas, in the mesopredator release hypothesis, mesopredators are being released from direct predation from the apex predators.

== See also ==
- Biodiversity
- Enemy release hypothesis
- Trophic cascade
- Trophic level
- Ecological release
