= MV Gondwana =

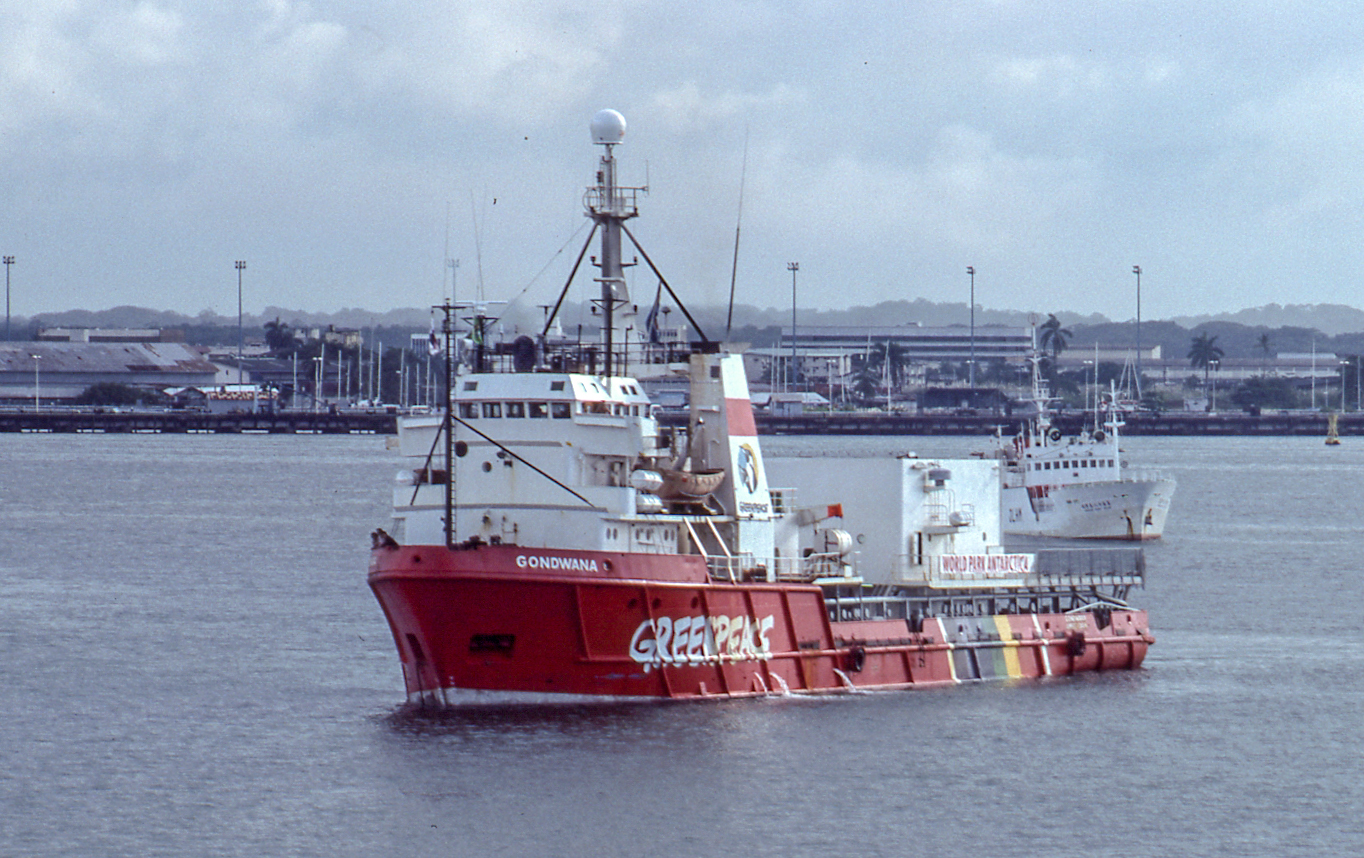
- Gondwana

History
- Name: Viking
- Completed: 1975
- Name: Gondwana
- Operator: Greenpeace
- Acquired: 1988
- Identification: IMO number: 7401320; Callsign: T2CB3

General characteristics
- Tonnage: 1,435 GT
- Length: 61.20 m (200 ft 9 in)

MV Gondwana was a ship acquired by Greenpeace in 1988, originally built in 1975 and called the Viking. Greenpeace updated the ship with a helipad and accommodation space was increased to sleep 33 people. The ship was used to supply the Greenpeace World Park Base in 1988/89 and was involved in direct action to protest against Japanese whaling in the Southern Ocean in the late 1980s.
