= Gonda, Raebareli =

Gonda
- Village
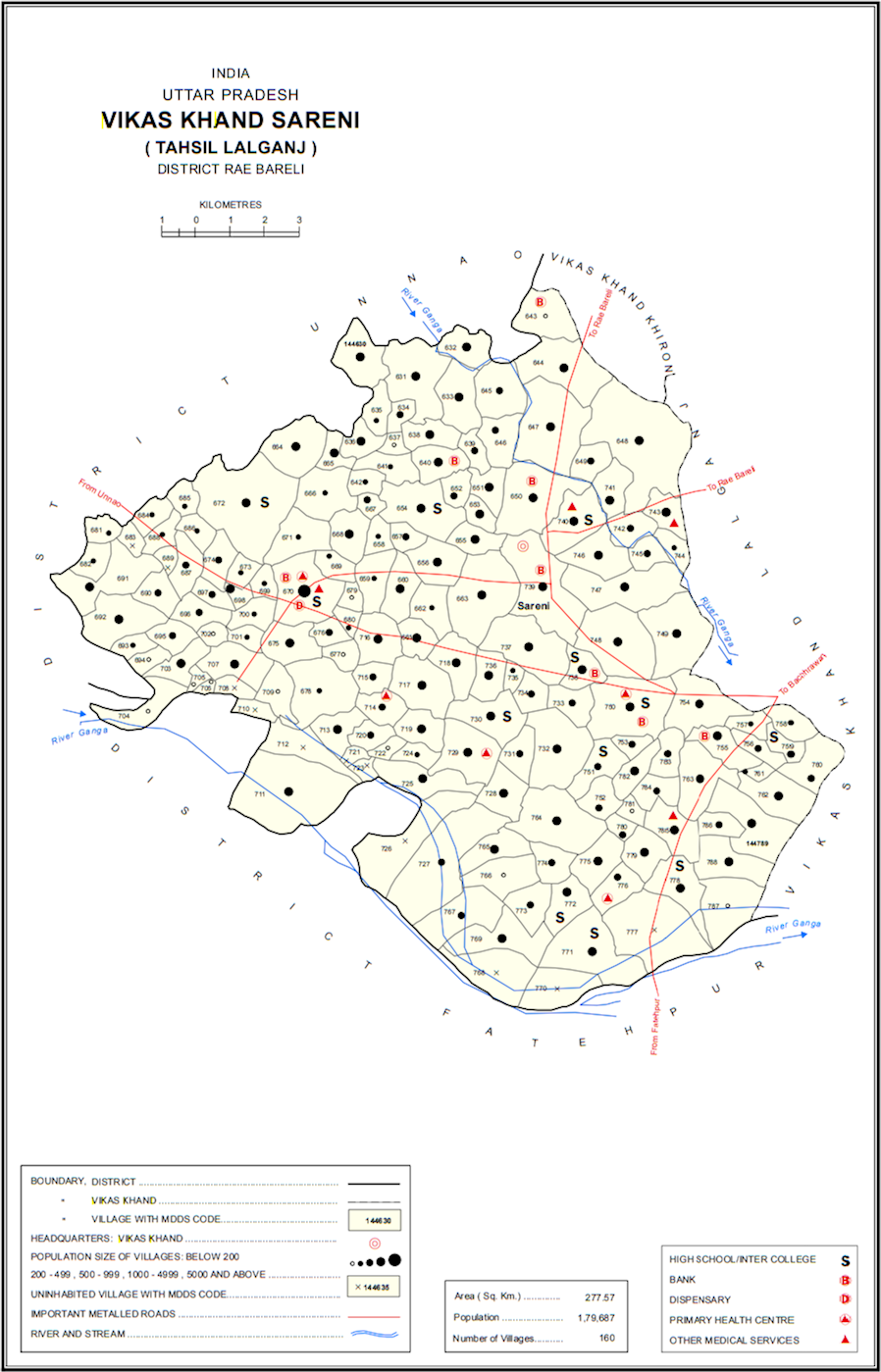
- Map showing Gonda (#727) in Sareni CD block

- Location in Uttar Pradesh, India
- Coordinates: 26.074517°N 80.799281°E
- Country: India
- State: Uttar Pradesh
- District: Raebareli

Area
  - Total: 1.171 km^{2} (0.452 sq mi)

Population (2011)
  - Total: 723
  - Density: 617/km^{2} (1,600/sq mi)

Languages
  - Official: Hindi
- Time zone: UTC+5:30 (IST)
- Vehicle registration: UP-35

Gonda is a village in Sareni block of Rae Bareli district, Uttar Pradesh, India. It is located 22 km from Lalganj, the tehsil headquarters. As of 2011, it has a population of 403 people, in 88 households. It has no schools or healthcare facilities, and does not host a weekly haat or a permanent market. It belongs to the nyaya panchayat of Raipur.

The 1951 census recorded Gonda as comprising 1 hamlet, with a population of 282 people (139 male and 143 female), in 56 households and 47 physical houses. The area of the village was given as 285 acres. 17 residents were literate, 15 male and 2 female. The village was listed as belonging to the pargana of Sareni and the thana of Sareni.

The 1961 census recorded Gonda as comprising 2 hamlets, with a population of 307 people (143 male and 164 female), in 59 households and 51 physical houses. The area of the village was given as 285 acres.

The 1981 census recorded Gonda as having a population of 464 people, in 85 households, and having an area of 123.82 hectares. The main staple foods were given as wheat and rice.

The 1991 census recorded Gonda as having a total population of 538 people (278 male and 260 female), in 90 households and 90 physical houses. The area of the village was listed as 117 hectares. Members of the 0-6 age group numbered 104, or 19% of the total; this group was 59% male (61) and 41% female (43). Members of scheduled castes made up 40% of the village's population, while no members of scheduled tribes were recorded. The literacy rate of the village was 41% (147 men and 73 women). 151 people were classified as main workers (121 men and 30 women), while 0 people were classified as marginal workers; the remaining 377 residents were non-workers. The breakdown of main workers by employment category was as follows: 70 cultivators (i.e. people who owned or leased their own land); 63 agricultural labourers (i.e. people who worked someone else's land in return for payment); 0 workers in livestock, forestry, fishing, hunting, plantations, orchards, etc.; 0 in mining and quarrying; 0 household industry workers; 1 worker employed in other manufacturing, processing, service, and repair roles; 0 construction workers; 2 employed in trade and commerce; 0 employed in transport, storage, and communications; and 15 in other services.
