= Gond =

Gond may refer to:

- Gondi people, people of central India
- Gondi language, the Dravidian language of the Gondi people
- Gond (raga), a musical composition in the Sikh tradition
- Gond (Forgotten Realms), a fictional deity in the Forgotten Realms campaign setting of the Dungeons & Dragons role-playing game.
- Gonds, a race in The Krotons, a serial in the television series Doctor Who

== People ==
- Asha Gond, Indian skateboarder
- Akshaywar Lal Gond (born 1947), Indian politician
- Anand Kumar Gond, Indian politician
- Maurice Gond (1884–1964), French soldier
- Nityananda Gond, Indian politician
- Ramji Gond (died 1860), Indian Gond chief
- Vijay Singh Gond (1957–2026), Indian politician
- Vinay Prakash Gond (born 1976), Indian politician

== See also ==
- Gondi (disambiguation)
- Gondwana (disambiguation)
