= Mesopredator =

Predator that is preyed upon

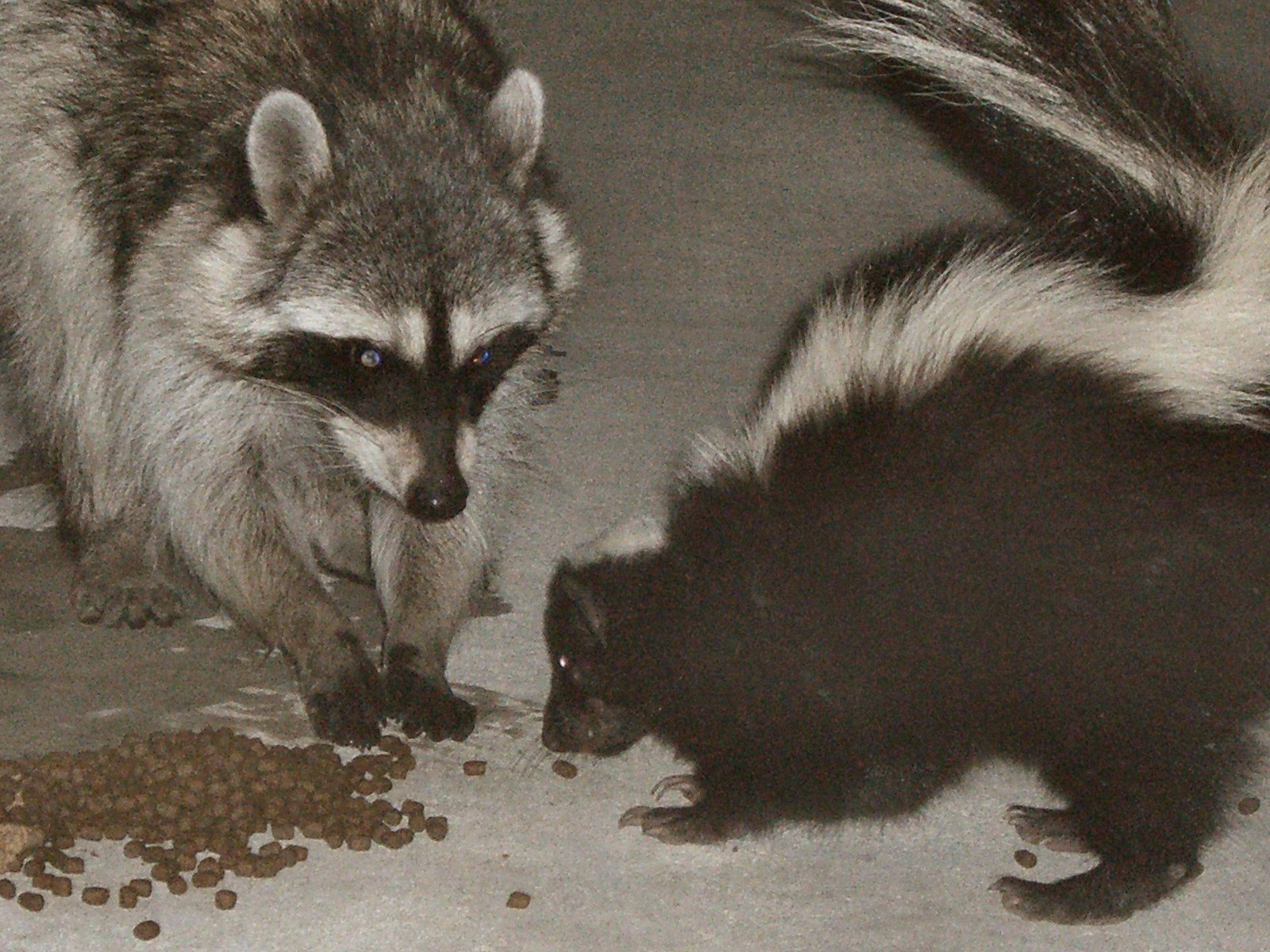
Raccoons and skunks are common examples of mesopredators. Pictured are a common raccoon and a striped skunk eating cat food in an urban area.

A mesopredator is a predatory animal that occupies a mid-ranking trophic level in a food web, typically preying on smaller animals who are lower-level consumers, while itself being preyed upon by larger predators. There is no standard, concrete definition of a mesopredator, though mesopredators tend to be small to medium-sized carnivorous or omnivorous animals such as mustelids (e.g. otters, martens and weasels), canines (e.g. foxes and coyotes) or felines (e.g. cats, lynxes, ocelots and the cheetah), often defined by contrast from the apex predators of a particular food web.

Mesopredators vary across different ecosystems. Sometimes, the same species is a mesopredator in one ecosystem but an apex predator in another ecosystem, depending on the biodiversity composition of the ecosystem and the presence of larger competitors. When new species are introduced into an ecosystem, the role of the mesopredator often changes; This can also happen if species are removed. Some mesopredators can quickly become invasive in a new ecosystem and subsequently cause detrimental impact on native species, examples being rainbow trout, brown trout, largemouth bass, American bullfrog, cane toad, red fox and feral cat, all of whom are included in IUCN's top 100 worst invasive species.

The American Institute of Biological Sciences states that because mesopredators are smaller than large carnivores, they are more abundant and therefore have greater species diversity and variations in their behaviour and ecology, from being solitary and reclusive to highly social. Due to their smaller size, mesopredators tend to seek cover among shrubs and burrows, thus often unwittingly partaking in the ecological role of seed dispersal, as well as driving community structure. Their smaller sizes and greater dietary diversity also allow them to thrive in a much wider range of habitats than larger carnivores. The population of smaller predators also tend to increase when the presence of larger carnivores decline, and this is known as a "mesopredator release". According to the National Park Service, "mesocarnivore release is defined as the expansion in range and/or abundance of a smaller predator following the reduction or removal of a larger predator."

Mesopredators' habitats have changed due to human settlements and land development, leading to habitat fragmentation and habitat loss. Urban sprawl has also driven many mesopredators to become urban wildlife. One impact of this is that many mesopredators have adapted to the new role of scavengers feeding on waste food and offals discarded by humans, examples being urban foxes, raccoons and, in some cases, black bears.

== Mesopredator release effect ==
When populations of an apex predator decrease, populations of mesopredators in the area often increase due to decreased competition and conflict with the apex predator. This is known as the mesopredator release effect, which refers to the release of mesopredators from the trophic cascade. These mesopredator outbreaks can lead to declining prey populations, destabilized ecological communities, reduced biodiversity, and can even drive local extinctions.

Typically, mesopredators are in competition with apex predators for food and other resources. Apex predators reduce mesopredator populations and change mesopredator behaviors and habitat choices by preying on and intimidating mesopredators. When apex predator populations decline, mesopredators can access hunting and den areas once controlled by the apex predators, essentially assuming the role of an apex predator. However, mesopredators often occupy different ecological niches than the former apex predator and will have different effects on the structure and stability of the ecosystem.

Mesopredator outbreaks are becoming more common in fragmented habitats, which are areas where a species' preferred environment is broken up by obstacles. Fragmented habitats can be caused by geological or human activity, and particularly affect larger animals that roam and hunt across large territories, such as apex predators. Fragmented habitats can drive these species to leave and find more suitable habitats.

Additionally, in many fragmented habitats, apex predators have more encounters with humans, leaving them susceptible to harmful or deadly conflicts, sometimes resulting in eradication of the apex predator population entirely. Human development also promotes mesopredator outbreaks through increasing access to resources such as pet food, trash, and crops.

The mesopredator release effect is not entirely understood. Most research has been conducted on mammal species, with limited studies on non-mammal animal species. Additionally, it is not well understood how these dynamics may play out in ecosystems with many mesopredator and apex predator species.

== See also ==
- Mesocarnivore
