= Apex predator =

Predator at the top of a food chain

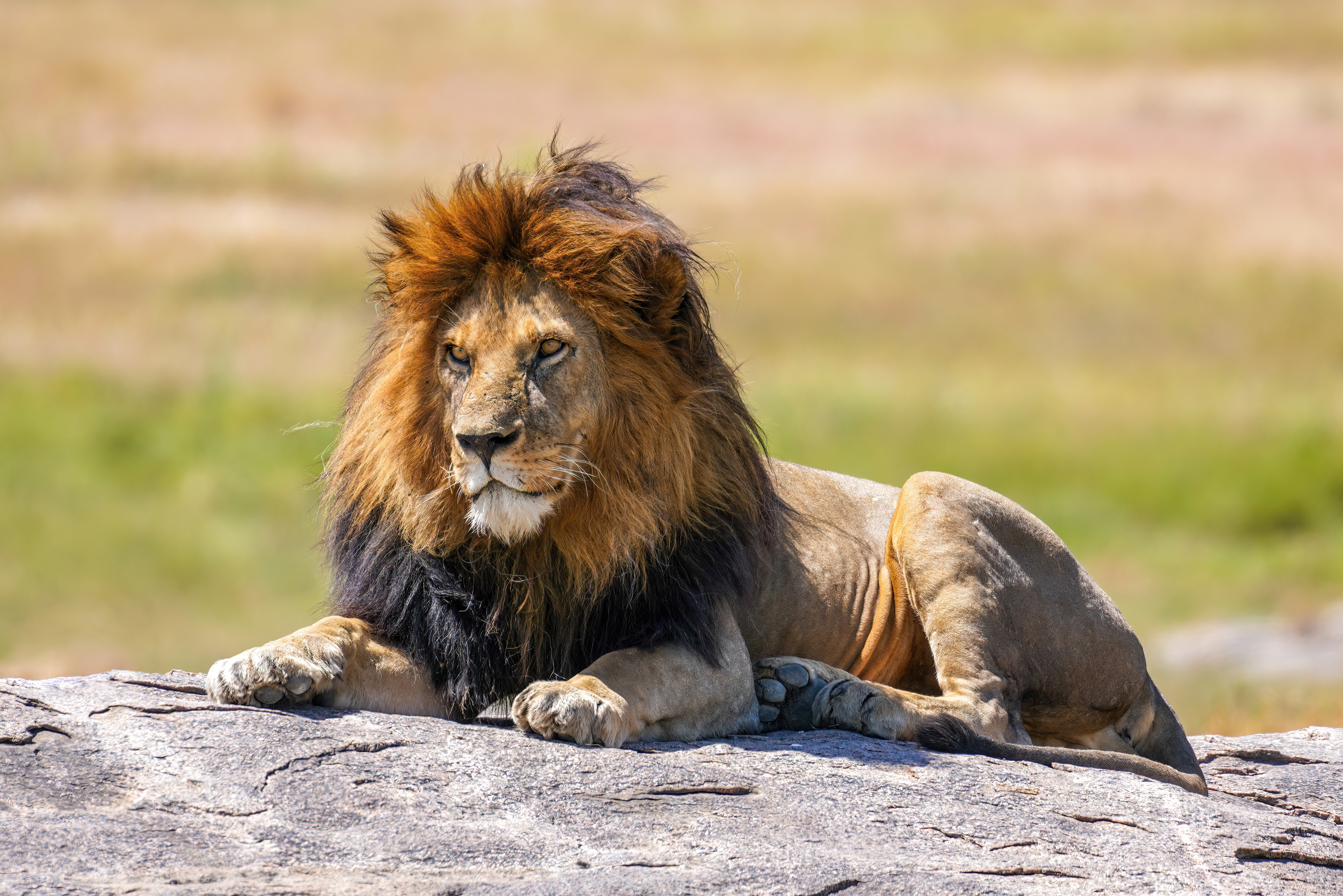
The lion is the world's second-largest big cat. Healthy adults are apex terrestrial predators in Africa.

An apex predator, also known as a top predator, macropredator or superpredator, is a predator (Note: Zoologists generally exclude parasites from trophic levels as they are (often much) smaller than their hosts, and individual species with multiple hosts at different life-cycle stages would occupy multiple levels. Otherwise, they would often be at the top level, above apex predators.) at the top of a food chain with few natural predators of their own, if any.

Apex predators are usually defined in terms of trophic dynamics, meaning that they occupy the highest trophic levels. Food chains are often far shorter on land, usually limited to being secondary consumers – for example, wolves prey mostly upon large herbivores (primary consumers), which eat plants (primary producers). The apex predator concept is applied in wildlife management, conservation, and ecotourism.

Apex predators have a long evolutionary history, dating at least to the Cambrian period when animals such as Anomalocaris and Timorebestia dominated the seas.

Humans, themselves being apex predators, have for many centuries interacted with other apex predators including the wolf, birds of prey, and cormorants to hunt game animals, birds, and fish respectively. More recently, humans have started interacting with apex predators in new ways. These include interactions via ecotourism, such as with the tiger shark, and through rewilding efforts, such as the reintroduction of the Iberian lynx.

== Ecological roles ==
=== Effects on community ===
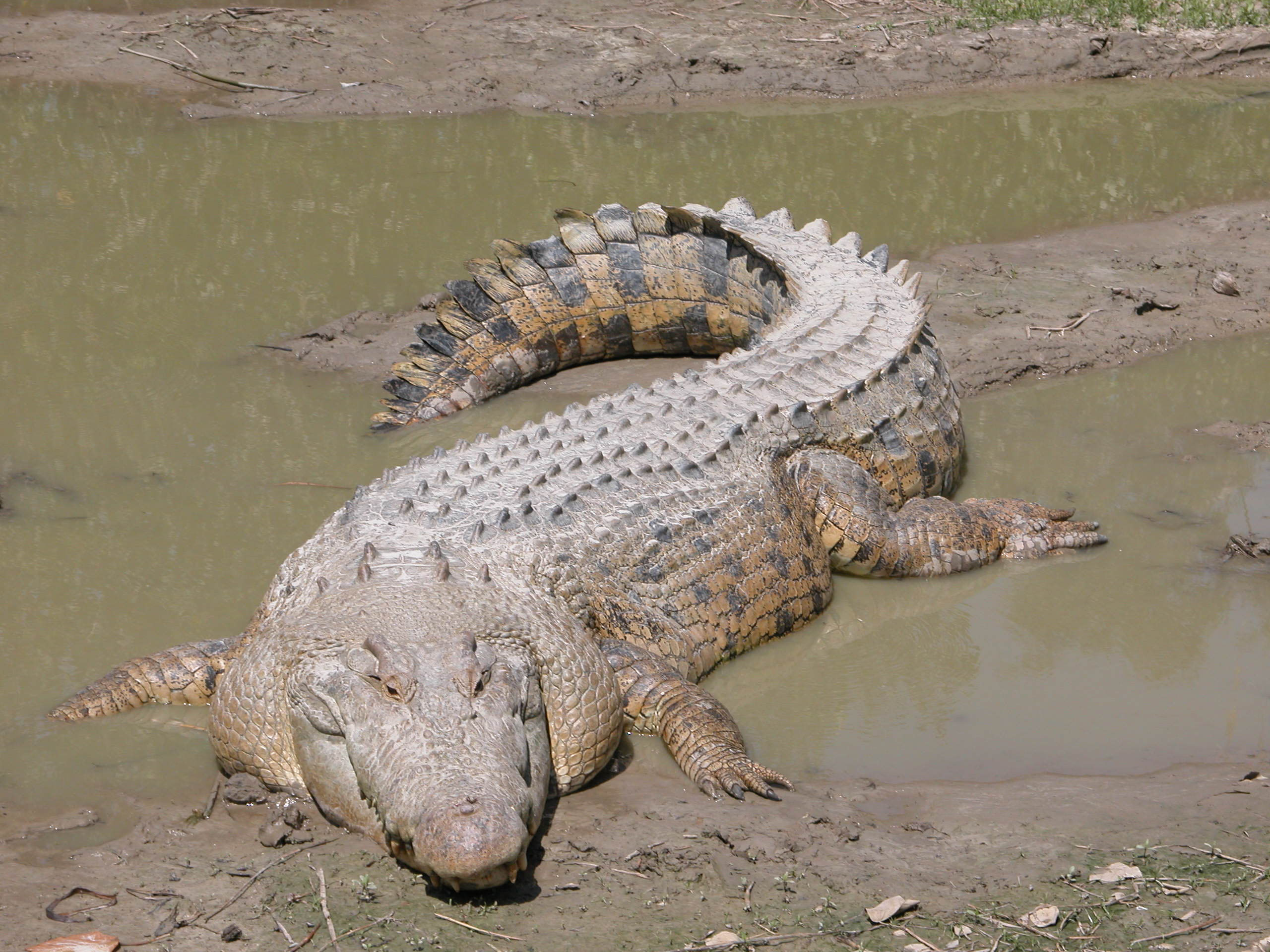
The saltwater crocodile is the largest living reptile and the dominant predator throughout its range.

Apex predators affect prey species' population dynamics and populations of other predators, both in aquatic and terrestrial ecosystems. Non-native predatory fish, for instance, have sometimes devastated formerly dominant predators. A lake manipulation study found that when the non-native smallmouth bass was removed, lake trout, the suppressed native apex predator, diversified its prey selection and increased its trophic level. As a terrestrial example, the badger, an apex predator, preys upon and also competes with the hedgehog, a mesopredator, for food such as insects, small mammals, reptiles, amphibians, and the eggs of ground-nesting birds. Removal of badgers (in a trial investigating bovine tuberculosis) caused hedgehog densities to more than double. Predators that exert top-down control on organisms in their community are often considered keystone species.

=== Effects on ecosystem ===
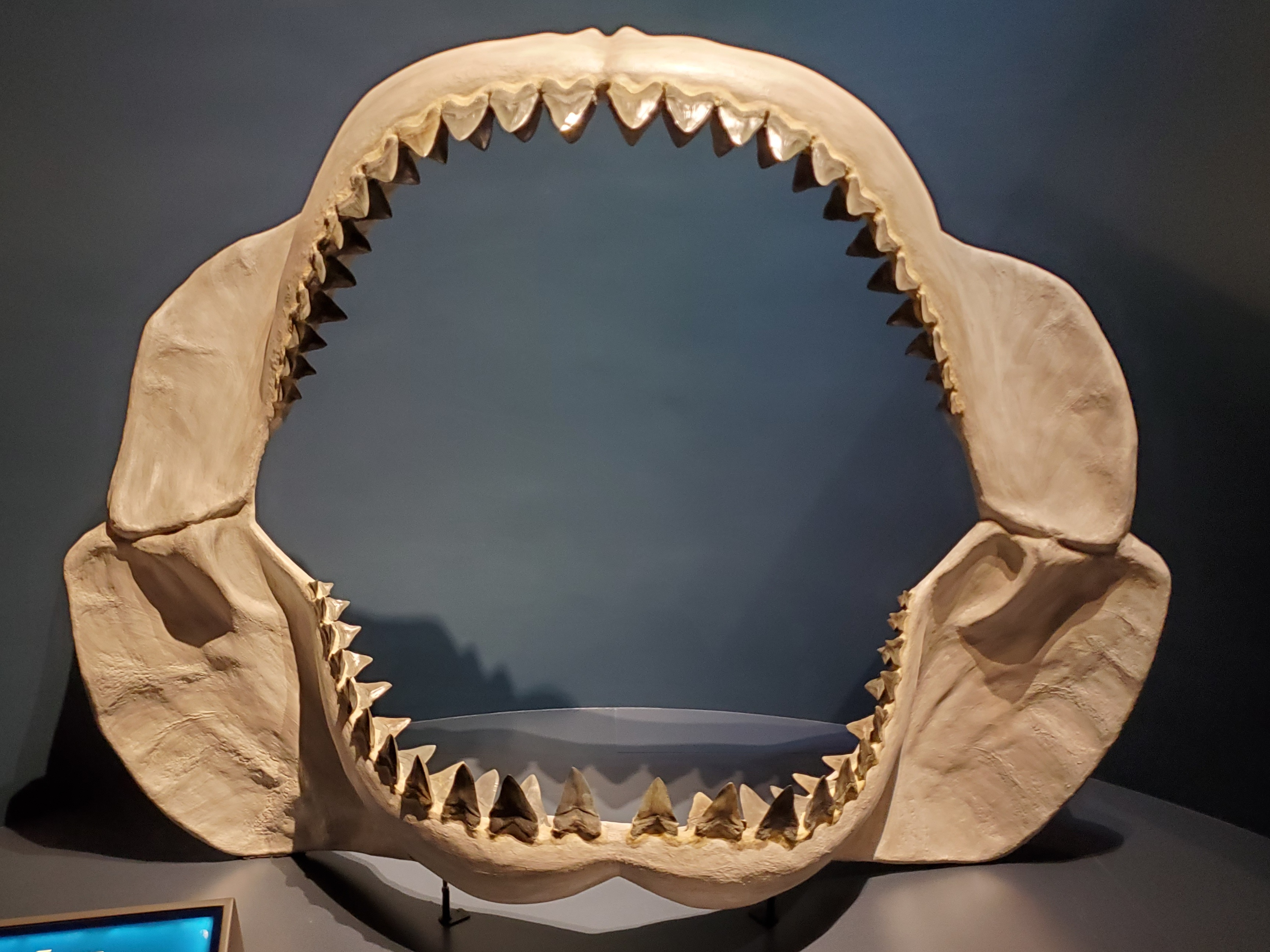
The Megalodon, the largest shark to have ever existed, had a major impact on global marine ecosystems.

Apex predators can have profound effects on ecosystems, as the consequences of both controlling prey density and restricting smaller predators, and may be capable of self-regulation. They are central to the functioning of ecosystems, the regulation of disease, and the maintenance of biodiversity. When introduced to subarctic islands, for example, Arctic foxes' predation of seabirds has been shown to turn grassland into the tundra. Such wide-ranging effects on lower levels of an ecosystem are termed trophic cascades. The removal of top-level predators, often through human agency, can cause or disrupt trophic cascades. For example, a reduction in the population of sperm whales, apex predators with a fractional trophic level of 4.7, by hunting has caused an increase in the population of the large squid, with trophic level over 4 (carnivores that eat other carnivores). This effect, called mesopredator release, occurs in terrestrial and marine ecosystems; for instance, in North America, the ranges of all apex carnivores have contracted whereas those of 60% of mesopredators have grown in the past two centuries.

=== Conservation ===
Because apex predators have powerful effects on other predators, herbivores, and plants, they can be important in nature conservation. Humans have hunted many apex predators close to extinction, but in some parts of the world, these predators are now returning. They are increasingly threatened by climate change. For example, the polar bear requires extensive areas of sea ice to hunt its prey, typically seals, but climate change is shrinking the sea ice of the Arctic, forcing polar bears to fast on land for increasingly long periods.

Dramatic changes in the Greater Yellowstone Ecosystem were recorded after the gray wolf, both an apex predator and a keystone species (one with a large effect on its ecosystem), was reintroduced to Yellowstone National Park in 1995 as a conservation measure. Elk, the wolves' primary prey, became less abundant and changed their behavior, freeing riparian zones from constant grazing and allowing willows, aspens, and cottonwoods to flourish, creating habitats for beaver, moose, and scores of other species. In addition to their effect on prey species, the wolves' presence also affected one of the park's vulnerable species, the grizzly bear: emerging from hibernation, having fasted for months, the bears chose to scavenge wolf kills, especially during the autumn as they prepared to hibernate once again. The grizzly bear gives birth during hibernation, so the increased food supply is expected to produce an increase in the number of cubs observed. Dozens of other species, including eagles, ravens, magpies, coyotes, and black bears have also been documented as scavenging from wolf kills within the park.

The great white shark (bottom) is one of the top marine predators; however, the orca (top) is known to prey upon them. (Note: Despite coexisting the majority of the time, confrontations may occur in stressed environments when both species compete for limited resources.)

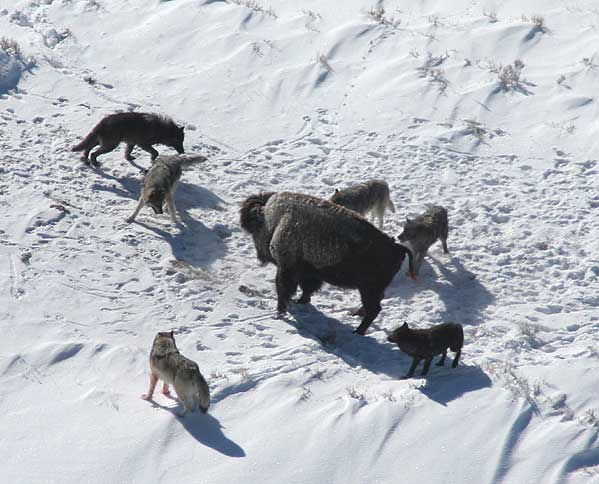
The wolf is both an apex predator and a keystone species, affecting its prey's behaviour and the wider ecosystem.

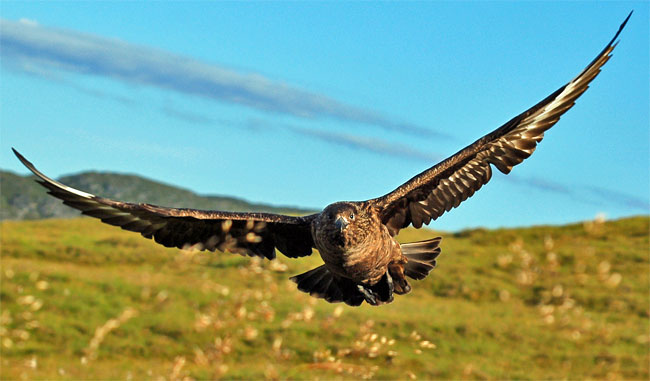
The great skua is an aerial apex predator, both preying on other seabirds and bullying them for their catches.

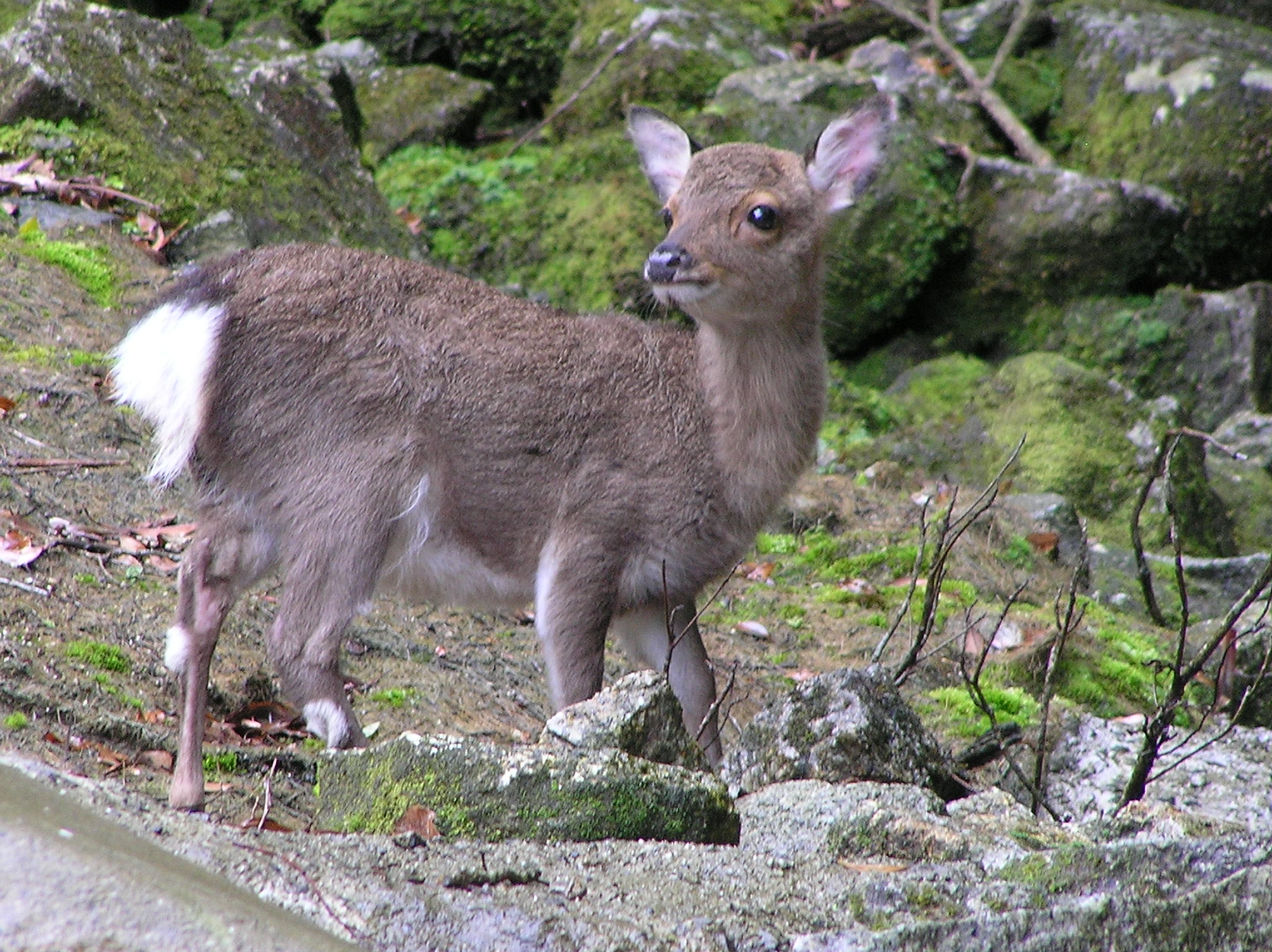
Animal populations among insular environments, which at times naturally lack apex predators, (Note: Such as the case of Cervus nippon yakushimae on Yakushima.) may be controlled through natural processes even without human interventions.

== Human trophic level ==
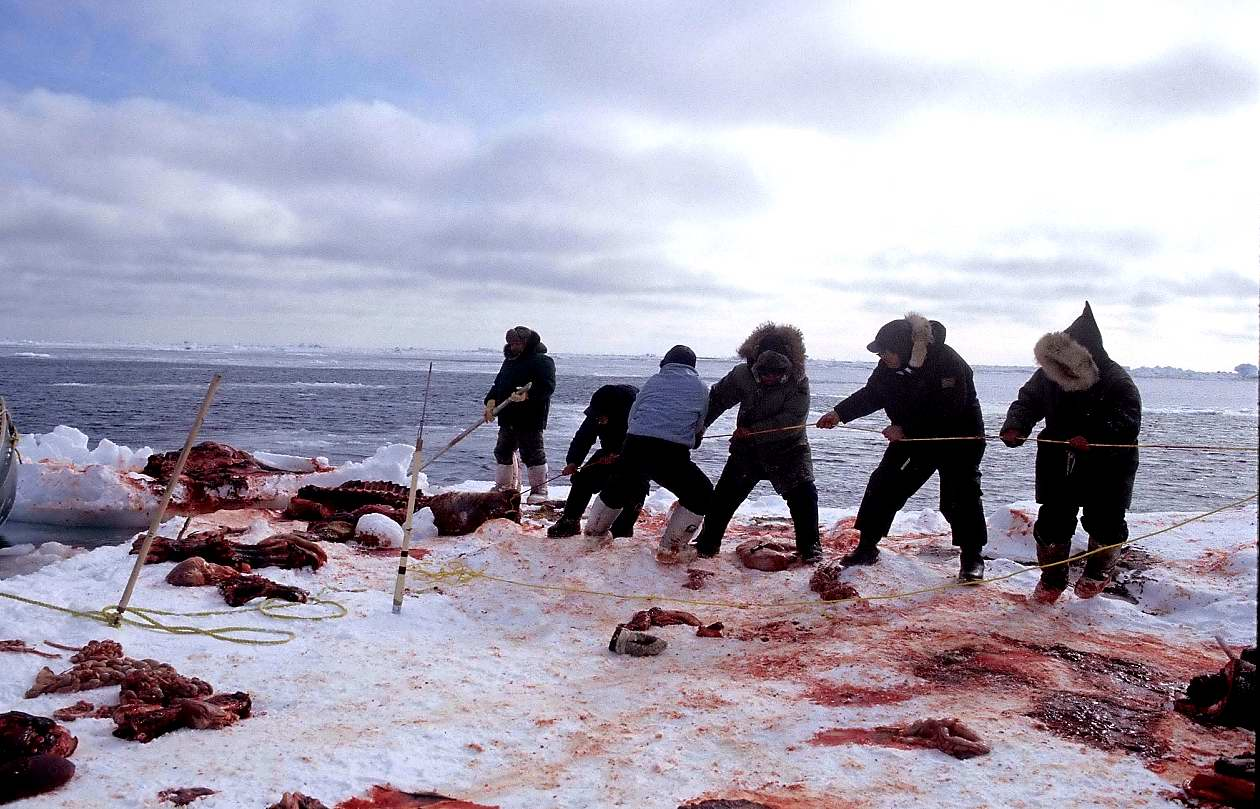
Humans sometimes live by hunting other animals for food and materials such as fur, sinew, and bone, as in this walrus hunt in the Arctic, but humans' status as apex predators is debated.

Ecologists have debated whether humans are apex predators. For instance, Sylvain Bonhommeau and colleagues argued in 2013 that across the global food web, a fractional human trophic level (HTL) can be calculated as the mean trophic level of every species in the human diet, weighted by the proportion that that species forms in the diet. This analysis gives an average HTL of 2.21, varying between 2.04 (for Burundi, with a 96.7% plant-based diet) and 2.57 (for Iceland, with 50% meat and fish, 50% plants). These values are comparable to those of non-apex predators such as the anchovy or pig.

In 2014, Peter D. Roopnarine criticized Bonhommeau's approach, arguing that humans are apex predators and that the HTL was based on terrestrial farming where indeed humans have a low trophic level, mainly eating producers (crop plants at level 1) or primary consumers (herbivores at level 2), which as expected places humans at a level slightly above 2. Roopnarine instead calculated the position of humans in two marine ecosystems, a Caribbean coral reef and the Benguela system near South Africa. In these systems, humans mainly eat predatory fish and have a fractional trophic level of 4.65 and 4.5, respectively, which in Roopnarine's view makes those humans apex predators. (Note: However, humans had a network trophic level (NTL) of 4.27 in the coral reef system, compared to an NTL of 4.8 for the blacktip shark in the same system. Therefore, humans were not the topmost apex predator there.)

In 2026, Miki Ben-Dor and colleagues compared human biology to that of animals at various trophic levels. Using metrics as diverse as tool use and acidity of the stomach, they concluded that humans evolved as apex predators, diversifying their diets in response to the disappearance of most of the megafauna that had once been their primary source of food.

== Evolutionary history ==
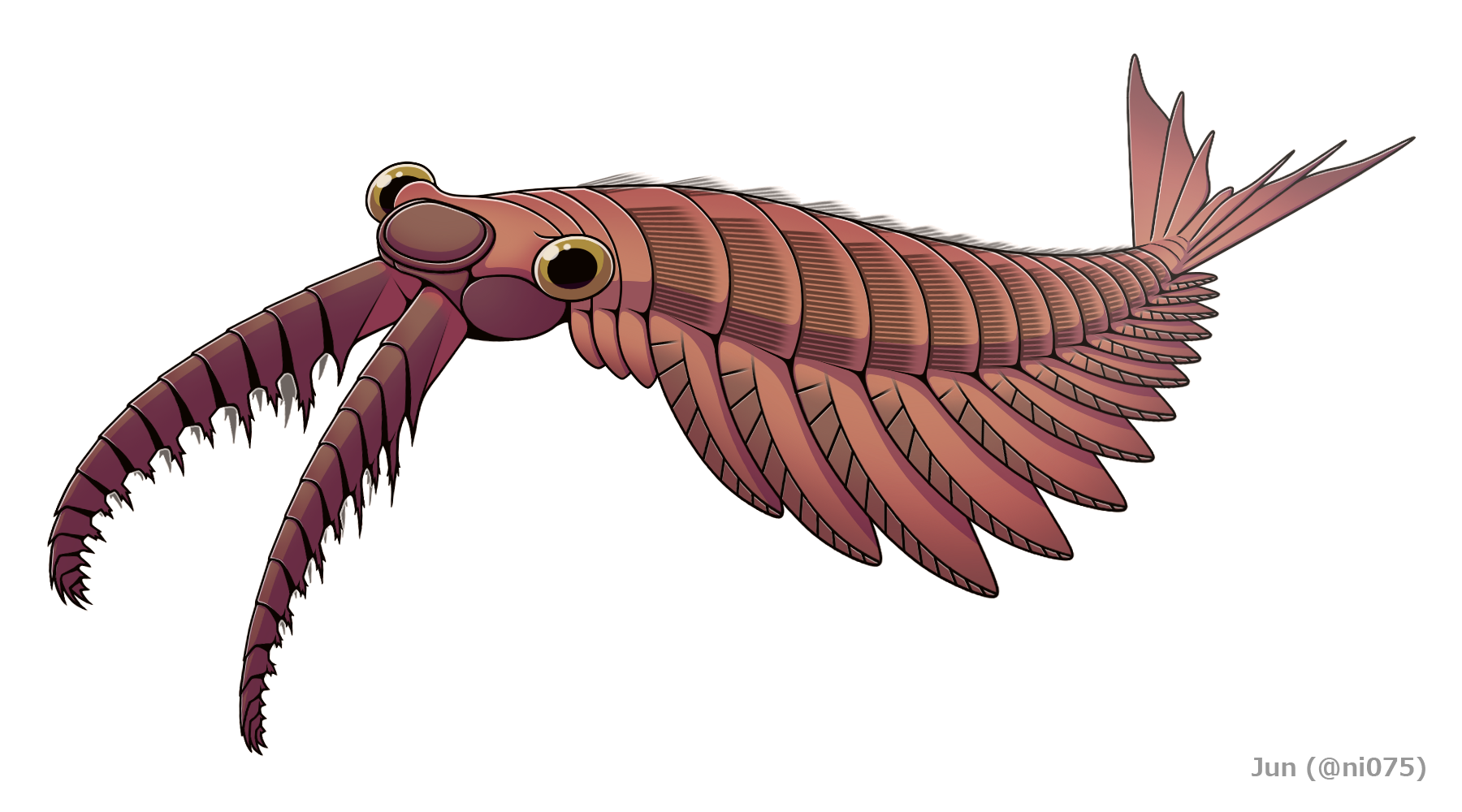
Anomalocaris was an apex predator in the Cambrian seas.

Apex predators are thought to have existed since at least the Cambrian period, around 500 million years ago. Extinct species cannot be directly determined to be apex predators as their behavior cannot be observed, and clues to ecological relationships, such as bite marks on bones or shells, do not form a complete picture. However, indirect evidence such as the absence of any discernible predator in an environment is suggestive. Anomalocaris was an aquatic apex predator, in the Cambrian. Its mouthparts are clearly predatory, and there were no larger animals in the seas at that time.

Carnivorous theropod dinosaurs including Allosaurus and Tyrannosaurus are theorized to have been apex predators, based on their size, morphology, and dietary needs.

A Permian shark, Triodus sessilis, was discovered containing two amphibians (Archegosaurus decheni and Cheliderpeton latirostre), one of which had consumed a fish, Acanthodes bronni, showing that the shark had lived at a trophic level of at least 4. (Note: Its trophic level would be exactly 4 if the fish's prey were pure herbivores, higher if the prey were themselves carnivorous.)

Among more recent fossils, the saber-tooth cats, like Smilodon, are considered to have been apex predators in the Cenozoic.

== Interactions with humans ==
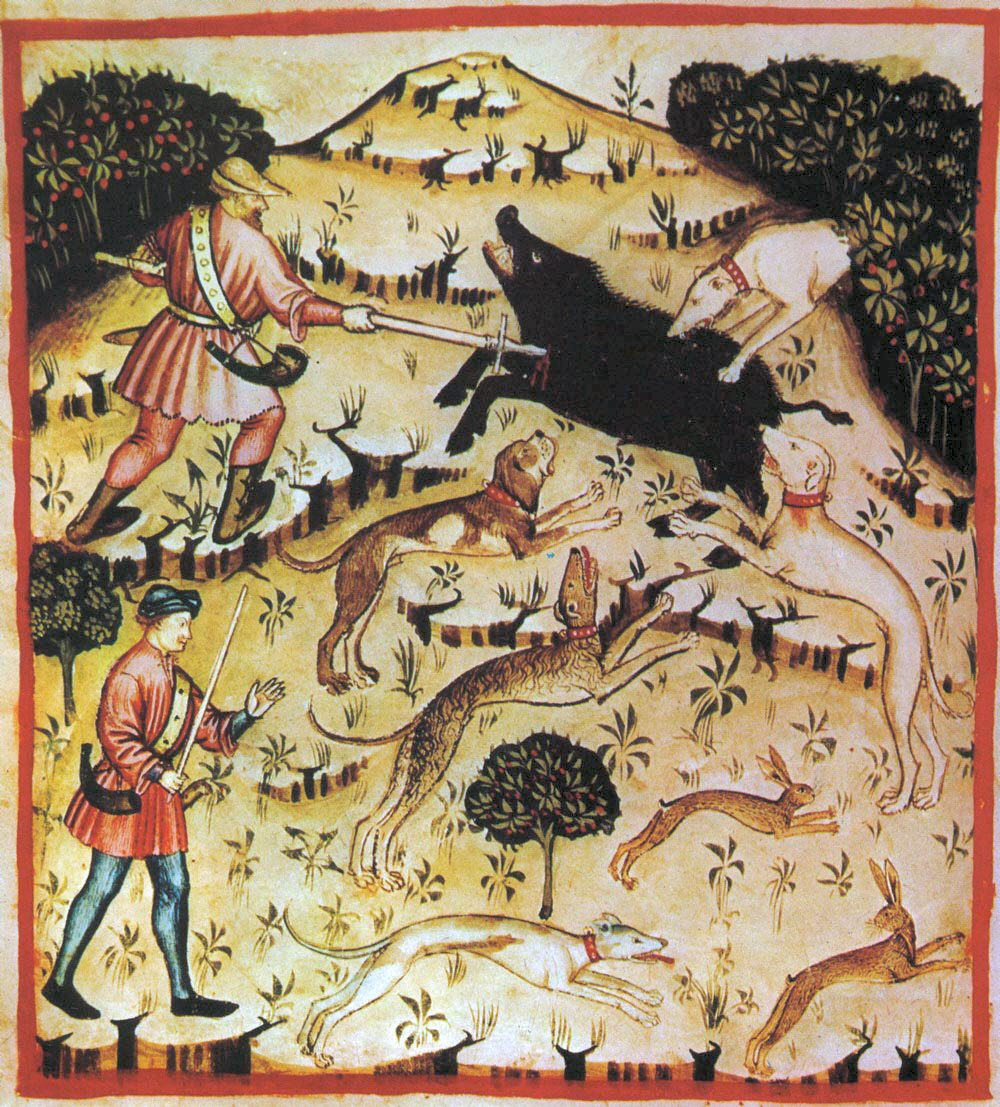
Dogs have been used in hunting for many millennia, as in this 14th century French depiction of a boar hunt.

=== Hunting ===
Humans hunted with apex predators in the form of wolves, and in turn with domestic dogs, for 40,000 years; this collaboration may have helped modern humans to outcompete the Neanderthals. Humans still hunt with dogs, which have often been bred as gun dogs to point to, flush out, or retrieve prey. The Portuguese Water Dog was used to drive fish into nets. Several breeds of dog, like the Scottish Deerhound, have been used to chase large prey such as deer and wolves.

Eagles and falcons, which are apex predators, are used in falconry, hunting birds or mammals. Tethered cormorants, also top predators, have been used to catch fish.

=== Ecotourism ===
Tiger sharks are popular ecotourism subjects, but their ecosystems may be affected by the food provided to attract them.

Ecotourism sometimes relies on apex predators to attract business. Tour operators may in consequence decide to intervene in ecosystems, for example by providing food to attract predators to areas that can conveniently be visited. This in turn can have effects on predator population and therefore on the wider ecosystem. As a result, provisioning of species such as the tiger shark is controversial, but its effects are not well established by empirical evidence. Other affected apex predators include big cats and crocodiles.

=== Rewilding ===
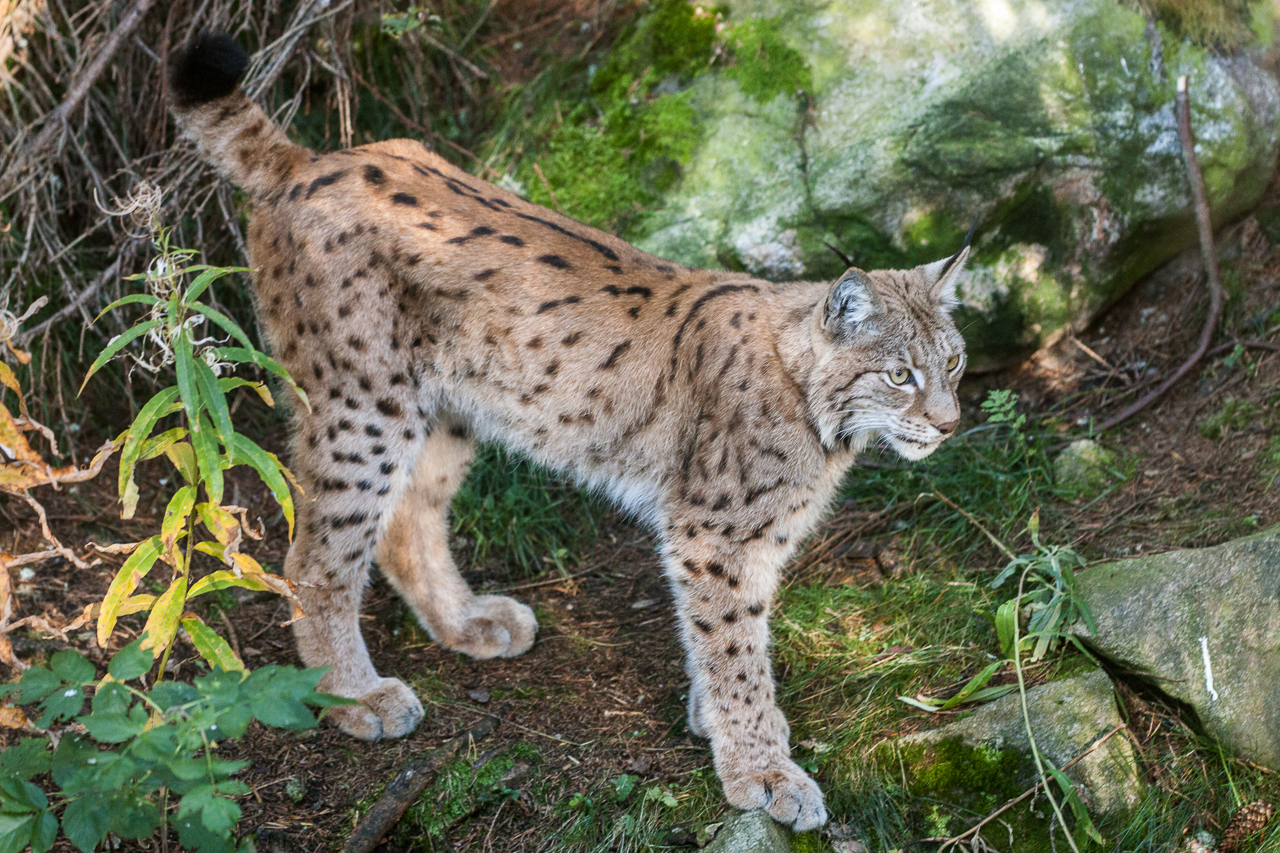
The reintroduction of predators like the lynx is attractive to conservationists, but alarming to farmers.

In some densely populated areas like the British Isles, large native predators like the wolf, bear, wolverine and lynx have become extirpated, allowing herbivores such as deer to multiply unchecked except by hunting. In 2015, plans were made to reintroduce lynx to the counties of Norfolk, Cumbria, and Northumberland in England, and Aberdeenshire in Scotland as part of the rewilding movement. The reintroduction of large predators is controversial, in part because of concern among farmers for their livestock. Conservationists such as Paul Lister propose instead to allow wolves and bears to hunt their prey in a "managed environment" on large fenced reserves; however, this undermines the objective of rewilding.

== List of apex predators ==
The following have been classified as apex predators:

- African wild dog
- Asian giant hornet
- Bald eagle
- Bengal tiger
- Bull shark
- Eurasian eagle-owl
- Giant squid
- Giant octopus
- Golden eagle
- Goliath birdeater
- Gray wolf
- Great skua
- Great white shark
- Grizzly bear
- Harpy eagle
- Humans
- Jaguar
- Komodo dragon
- Leopard seal
- Lion
- Lynx
- Nile crocodile
- Orca
- Polar bear
- Saltwater crocodile
- Scorpion
- Siberian tiger
- Snow leopard
- Sperm whale
- Tasmanian devil
- Tiger beetle
- Tiger shark

=== Extinct apex predators ===
- Allosaurus
- Anomalocaris
- Cameroceras
- Giganotosaurus
- Megalodon
- Smilodon
- Spinosaurus
- Triodus
- Tyrannosaurus
