= Michal Gonda =

Slovak footballer

Personal information
- Full name: Michal Gonda
- Date of birth: 29 August 1982 (age 44)
- Place of birth: Czechoslovakia
- Height: 1.74 m (5 ft 8 1/2 in)
- Position: Midfielder

Team information
- Current team: MFK Karviná
- Number: 8

Youth career
- Slovan Bratislava

Senior career*
Years	Team	Apps	(Gls)
- Slovan Bratislava B
2003–2006	Příbram		
2004–2005	→ Pardubice (loan)		
2006–2007	Dolný Kubín		
2008–2009	Slovácko	33	(4)
2010	Opava	14	(2)
2010–	Karviná	43	(3)

International career
- Slovakia U21
- * Club domestic league appearances and goals as of 21 January 2013

Michal Gonda (born 29 August 1982) is a Slovak football midfielder who played for the Czech 2. liga club MFK Karviná.

== Career ==
Gonda played for Slovak lower-league MFK Dolný Kubín, then considered the strongest club in the Orava region. He spent three seasons with 1. FC Slovácko and played 33 matches, including 5 appearances in the Gambrinus Liga.

During the 2013 season at MFK Karviná, Gonda played as a substitute for the first nine matches, and got his first start during the tenth match.
