= Indian natural history =

Natural history in the Indian subcontinent has a long heritage with a recorded history going back to the Vedic era. Natural history research in early times included the broad fields of palaeontology, zoology and botany. These studies would today be considered under field of ecology but in former times, such research was undertaken mainly by amateurs, often physicians, civil servants and army officers.

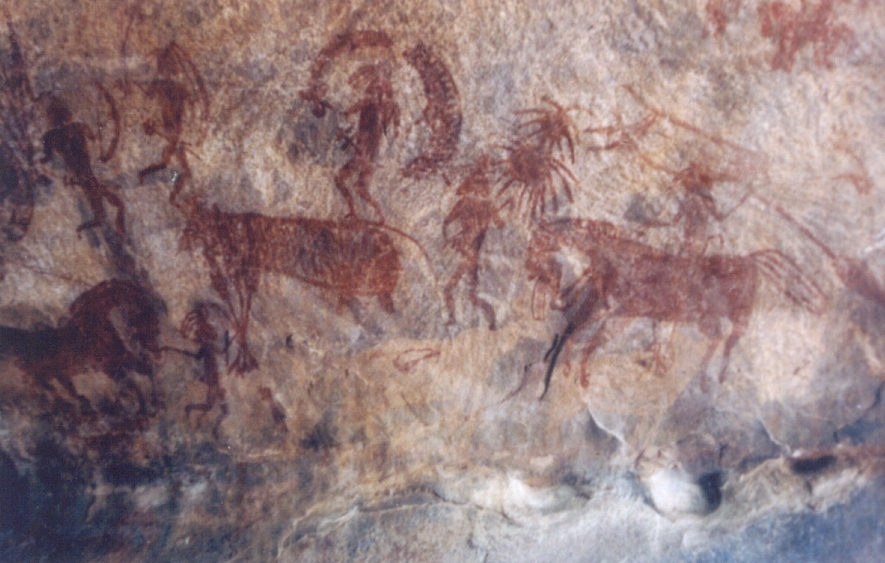
Rock painting from Bhimbetka showing a hunt

Although the growth of modern natural history in India can be attributed to British colonialism and the growth of natural history in Britain, there is considerable evidence to suggest that India with its diverse landscapes, fauna and flora along with other tropical colonies helped in creating an increased interest in natural history in Britain and elsewhere in the world. Natural history in India was also enriched by older traditions of conservation, folklore, nature study and the arts.

== Indus Valley Civilization ==
Over a thousand sites of the Indus Valley civilisation across north west South Asia, before 1700 BC have been studied to date. A large number of animal bones have been found at these sites; one-fifth of these comprising bones of wild fauna, such as the jackal, hare, chital, rhinoceros and elephant. Most seeds found in the dwellings of some western Indian sites are of wild plants now extinct in the region.

The fauna and flora of those times are richly represented in the clay pottery and tablets excavated from these sites. Clay tablets document many species of now locally extinct wildlife including rhinoceros and elephant. A tiger seal has been found in Harrappa dating back to 3000 BC.

The swamp deer or barasingha was found in Mehrgarh in Baluchistan till 300 BC and probably became locally extinct due to over-hunting and loss of riverine habitat to cultivation. A species of wild cattle, Bos primegenius nomadicus or the zebu vanished early on from its range in the Indus basin and western India, possibly due to inter-breeding with domestic cattle and resultant fragmentation of wild populations due to loss of habitat.

The first recorded domestication of the elephant was in Harappan times and the animal ultimately went on to serve as a siege engine, mount in war, status symbol, work animal, and an elevated platform for hunting.

== Vedic period ==
The Vedas represent some of the oldest historical records available (1500 – 500 BC) and they list the names of nearly 250 kinds of birds besides many other notes on various other fauna and flora. In the vedic texts, Aryavarta, the land of the Aryans, was considered to be co-terminous with the range of the blackbuck. Sometimes, these referred to the lands North of the Vindhyas; at others times, it included lands to the South. A notable piece of information mentioned in the Vedas is the knowledge of brood parasitism in the Indian koel, a habit known well ahead of Aristotle (384 – 322 BC). This is possibly because both the Indian koel and its host the house crow were common and easy to observe.

The medical treatises of Charaka and Sushruta mention wildlife from the point of view of the meats the forests yielded and their associated attributes. The stratification of Hindu society into the caste system saw the warrior caste or kshatriya setting itself apart on hereditary lines; one assertion of which was the right to eat certain animals. The treatises espoused rules as to when, and who could or could not eat flesh of particular animals; for example, the flesh of the lion and tiger were to be consumed solely by regents and that too on rare occasions.

The elephant was another well studied wild animal and the capture, training and maintenance of elephants was documented in the 2000-year-old text Gajashastra written in the Pāli script.

The Tamil literature of the Sangam period, depicts a classification of land into 5 eco-types; ranging from the littoral to wet paddy fields. These landscapes were named after specific species of plants, named after their flowers (Strobilanthes spp., Jasminus spp., Lagerstroemia reginae, Wrightia tinctoria and Nymphaea. The Tamils also designated specific faunal assemblages for each of these five landscapes. Unlike most of the natural history information in Indian poetry, the Sangam poems contain realistic descriptions of morphology, behaviour and ecology of various species, besides astonishing comparison of flora (or floral parts) with fauna (or their parts).

== The Maurya period ==
The protection of animals became serious business by the time of the Maurya dynasty in the 4th and 3rd centuries BC. The first empire to provide a unified political entity in India, the attitude of the Mauryas towards forests, its denizens and fauna in general is of interest.

The Mauryas firstly looked at forests as a resource. For them, the most important forest product was the elephant. Military might in those times depended not only upon horses and men but also battle-elephants; these played a role in the defeat of Seleucus, Alexander's governor of the Punjab. The Mauryas sought to preserve supplies of elephants since it was more cost and time-effective to catch, tame and train wild elephants than raise them. Kautilya's Arthashastra contains not only maxims on ancient statecraft, but also unambiguously specifies the responsibilities of officials such as the Protector of the Elephant Forests:

On the border of the forest, he should establish a forest for elephants guarded by foresters. The Superintendent should with the help of guards...protect the elephants whether along on the mountain, along a river, along lakes or in marshy tracts...They should kill anyone slaying an elephant.

— Arthashastra

The Mauryas also designated separate forests to protect supplies of timber, as well as lions and tigers, for skins. Elsewhere the Protector of Animals also worked to eliminate thieves, tigers and other predators to render the woods safe for grazing cattle.

The Mauryas valued certain forest tracts in strategic or economic terms and instituted curbs and control measures over them. They regarded all forest tribes with distrust and controlled them with bribery and political subjugation. They employed some of them, the food-gatherers or aranyaca to guard borders and trap animals. The sometimes tense and conflict-ridden relationship nevertheless enabled the Mauryas to guard their vast empire.

The Mauryan emperor Ashoka (304 – 232 BC), embraced Buddhism in the latter part of his reign and brought about significant changes in his style of governance. He provided protection to fauna and even relinquished the royal hunt. He was perhaps the first ruler to advocate conservation measures for wildlife and even had rules inscribed in stone edicts. The edicts proclaim that many followed the king's example in giving up the slaughter of animals; one of them proudly states:

Our king killed very few animals.

— Edict on Fifth Pillar

However, the edicts of Ashoka and the contents of Arthashastra reflect more the desire of rulers than actual events; the mention of a 100 'panas' fine for poaching deer in royal hunting preserves shows that rule-breakers did exist. The legal restrictions conflicted with the freedoms exercised by the common people in hunting, felling, fishing and setting fires in forests.

== Chalukya period ==
Arguably, the best treatise on hunting in Sanskrit was the Manasollasa composed in the times of the Chalukyas, the 12th century rulers of the Deccan. Another work from this period was Mriga Pakshi Shastra, a treatise on mammals and birds written in the 13th century by a Jain poet, Hamsadeva. The accuracy of the content has however been critiqued by many including Salim Ali.

== Mughal period ==
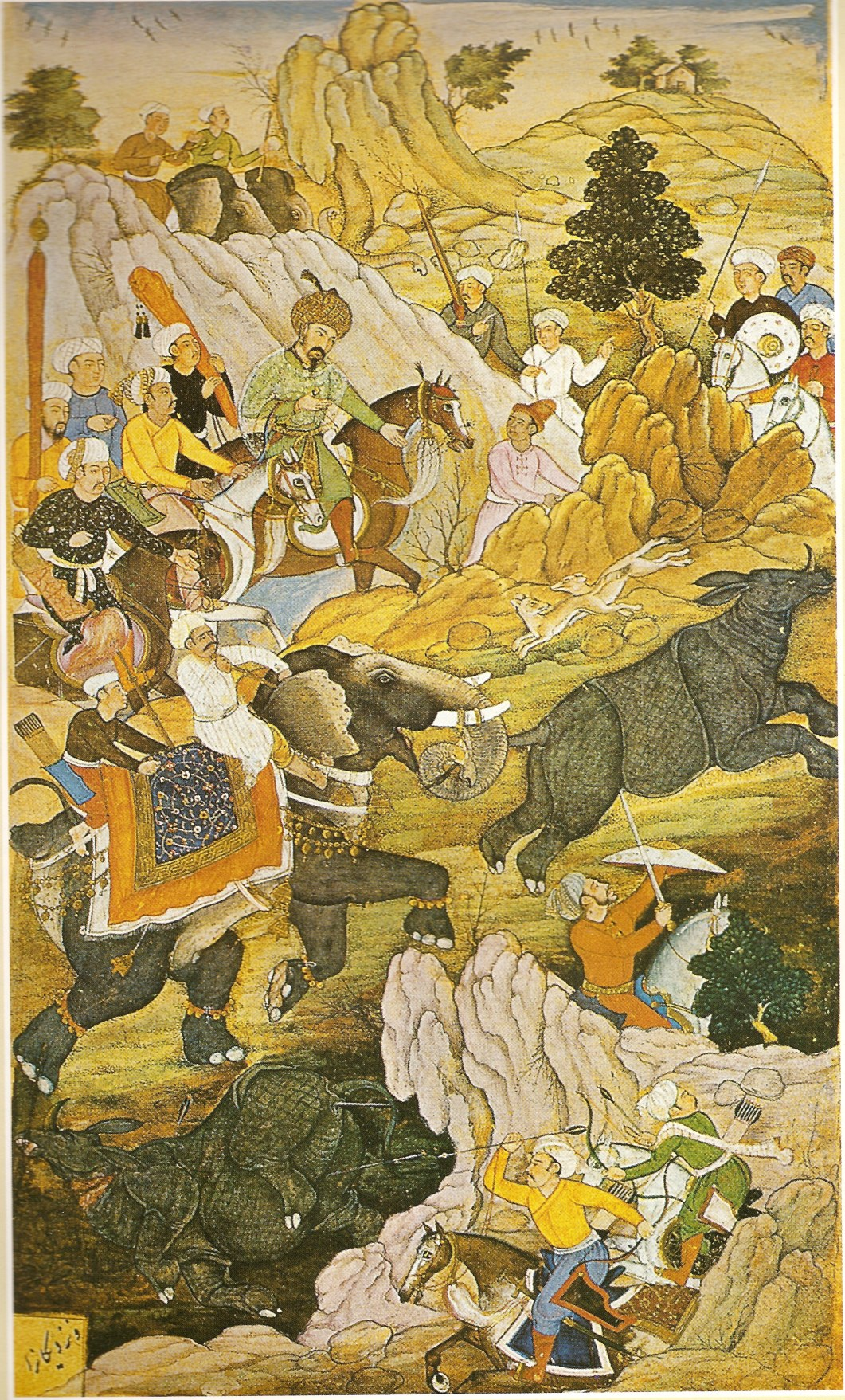
Babur hunting rhino near Peshawar

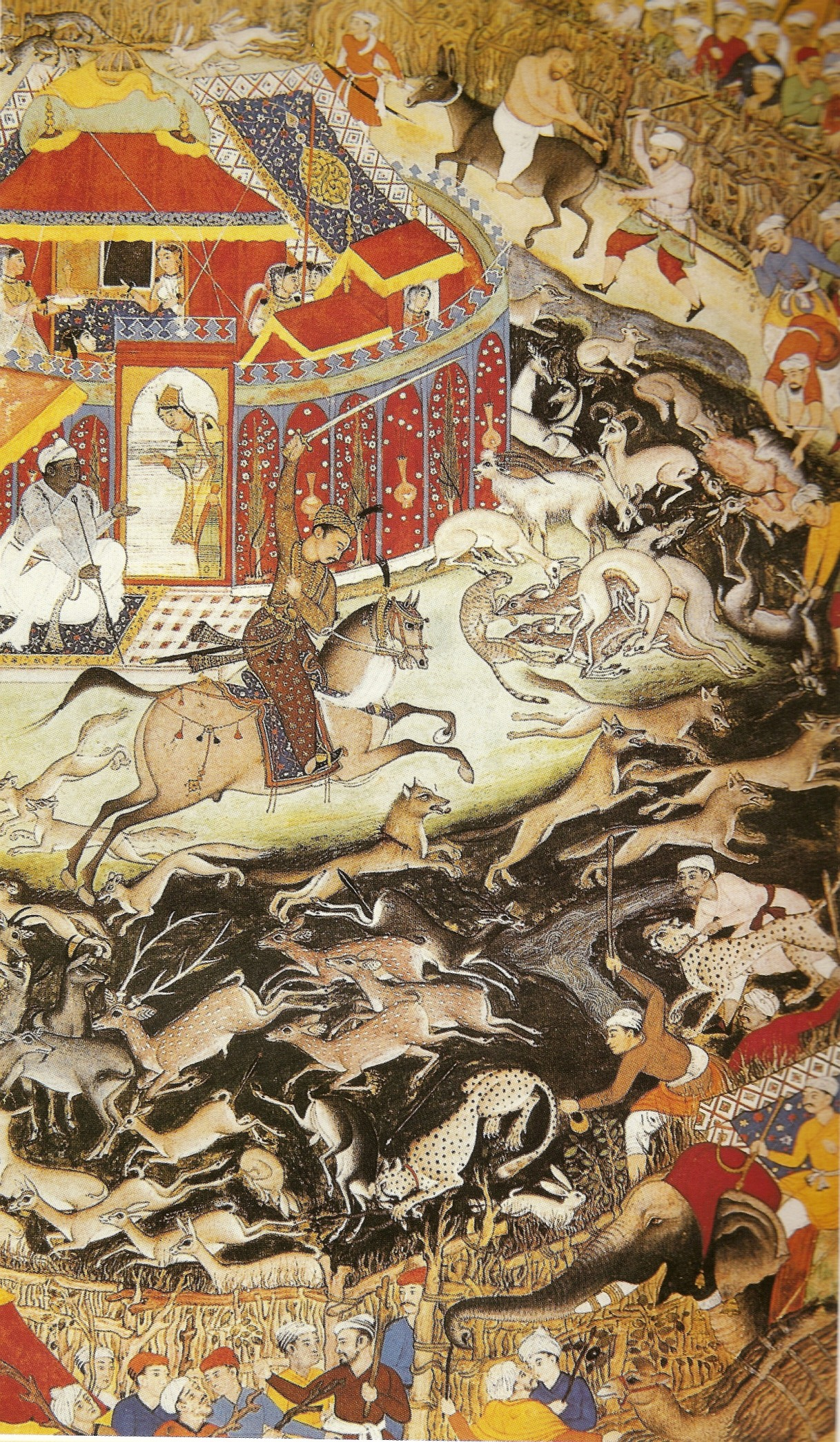
Blackbuck hunting with cheetahs from the Akbarnama

The Moghul emperors not only led a leisurely life but also pursued gardening and art. They decorated their gardens with their private zoos and hired artists to paint many subjects including plants and animals. Hunting and falconry were also extensively practised. They also employed scribes and were among the first to document their observations of nature in India. The foremost of the observers were Jehangir (1569–1627) and Babur (1483–1530) (See also Baburnama).

=== Babur ===
The notes of Babur for instance indicate the former distribution of the rhinoceros as far west as the Indus:

The Lesser Rhinoceros is found at present in the Bengal Sunderbuns, and a very few individuals are stated to occur in the forest tract along the Mahanuddy river, and extending northwards towards Midnapore; and also on the northern edge of the Rajmahal hills near the Ganges. It occurs also more abundantly in Burmah, and thence through the Malayan peninsula to Java and Borneo. Several have been killed quite recently within a few miles of Calcutta. One of these species formerly existed on the banks of the Indus, where it was hunted by the Emperor Baber. Individuals of this species are not unfrequently taken about the country as a show.

— Thomas C. Jerdon, 1874. Mammals of India

Salim Ali provides more details of this incident:

We continued our march till we came near Bekram (Peshawar) and then halted. Next morning we continued halting in the same station, and I went out to hunt the Rhinoceros. We crossed the Siah-Ab (i.e. Black River perhaps another name tor the Bara) in front of Bekram, and formed our ring lower down the river. When we had gone a short way, a man came after us with notice that a rhinoceros had entered a little wood near Bekram and that they had surrounded the wood and were waiting lot us. We immediately proceeded towards the wood at full gallop and east a ring round it. Instantly on our raising the shout the rhinoceros issued out into the plain. Humayun and those who had come from the same quarter (i.e. from Turkestan) never having seen a rhinoceros before, were greatly amused. They followed it for nearly a kos, shot many arrows at it and finally brought it down. The rhinoceros did not make a good set at any person or any horse. They afterwards killed another rhinoceros. I had often amused myself by conjecturing how an elephant and rhinoceros would behave it brought to face each other; on this occasion the elephant keepers brought out the elephants so that one elephant fell right in with the rhinoceros. As soon as the drivers put their beasts in motion, the rhinoceros would not come up but immediately ran off in another direction.

=== Jahangir ===
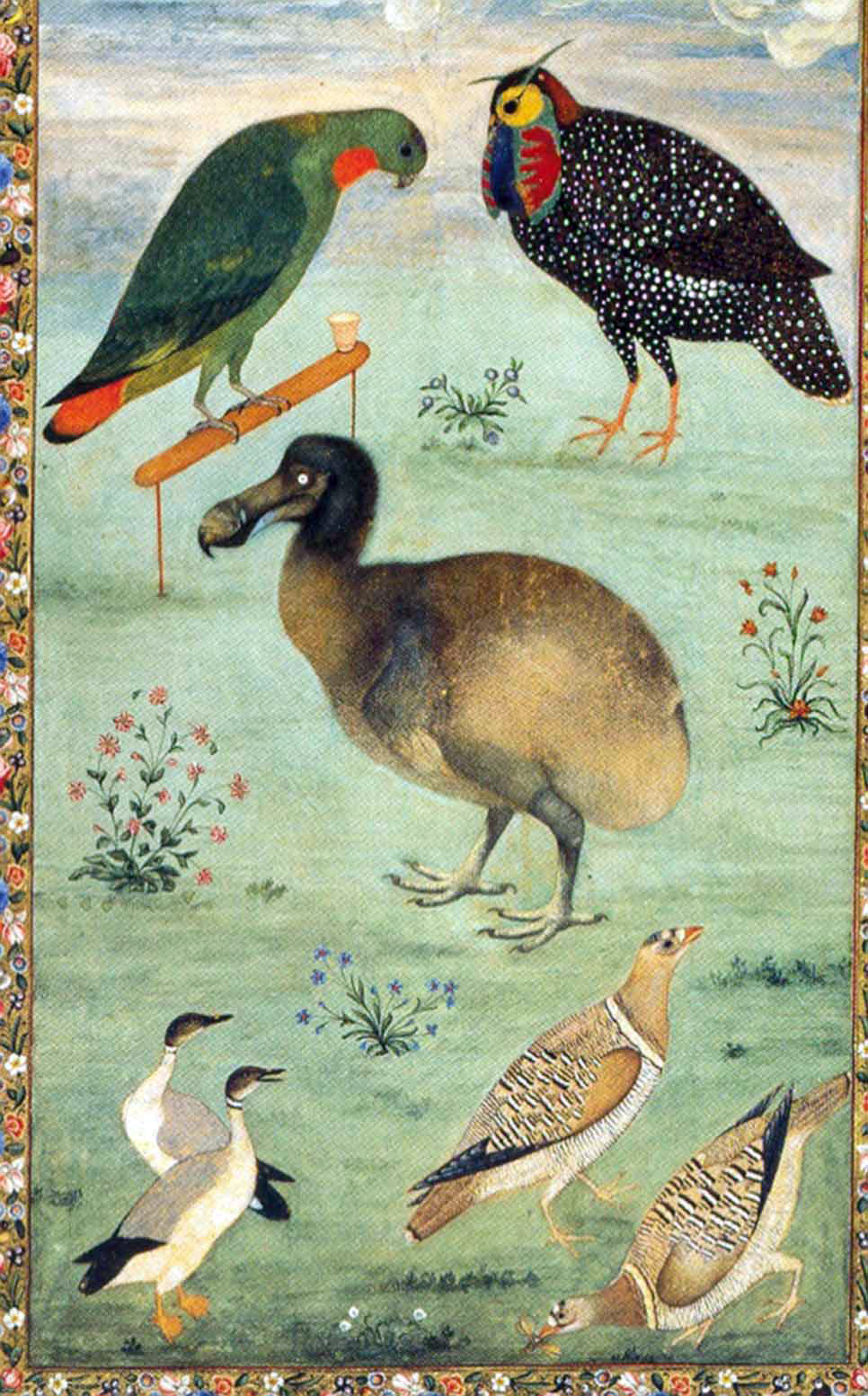
Painting of a dodo attributed to Ustad Mansur

Jahangir also kept detailed records of his hunts. From the ages of 12 (1580) to 48, 28,532 animals had been hunted with 17,167 by himself. These included 86 tigers (and lions), 9 bears, leopards, foxes, otters (ubdilao) and hyaenas, 889 – blue bulls (nilgai) and 35 mhaka. Salim Ali suggests that the mhaka must refer to swamp deer.

Salim Ali in his 1927 article The Moghul emperors of India and naturalists and sportsmen notes:

The Emperor Jehangir mentions that one day he was hunting the rhinoceros from an elephant in the Kul Nuh Ban (Forest) in the neighbourhood of Aligarh. He says 'A rhinoceros appeared and I struck it with a bullet on the face (mana) near the lobe of the year. The bullet penetrated for about a span. From the bullet it fell and gave up its life. It has often happened in my presence that powerful men (jawanan) good shots with the bow, have shot 20 or 30 arrows at them and not killed.' This took place about the year 1622 AD. It has been stated that the animal was a wolf, but this is obviously incorrect. In Persian Gurg is a wolf and Kurg a rhinoceros. A wolf certainly would not require 20 or 30 arrows to kill it.

Ustad Mansur, a 17th-century court artist of Jehangir, was the first man to accurately paint the Siberian crane. The dodo was brought to Jehangir's court via Portuguese controlled Goa and an unsigned painting of it in the Hermitage Museum is attributed to Mansur.

== Pre-colonial period ==
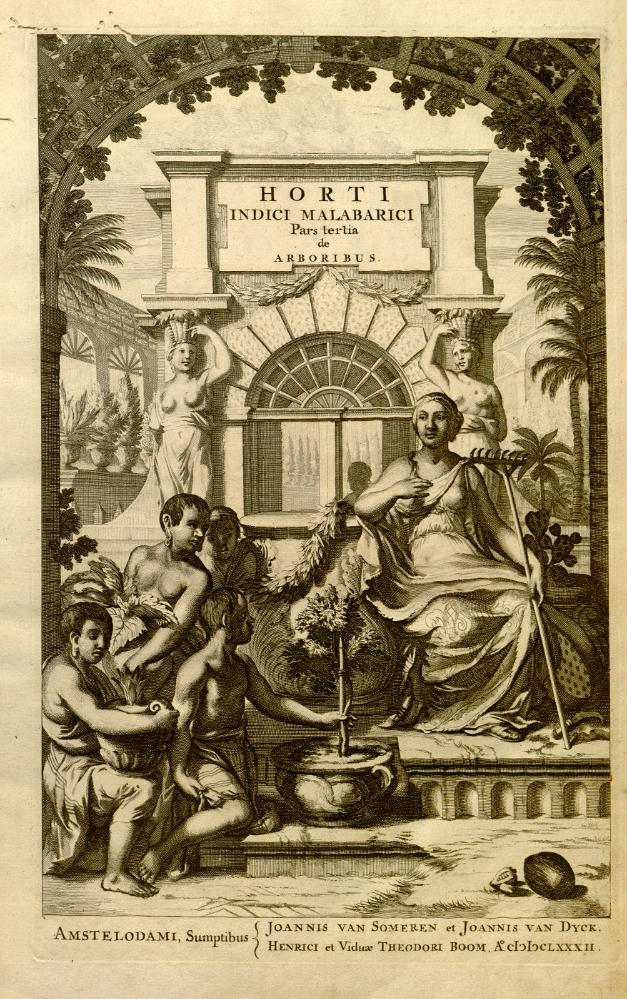
Cover of Hortus Malabaricus

Hortus indicus malabaricus was the oldest regional flora for any part of the world and was published in India in the 18th century by the Dutch East India Company through the work of Hendrik van Rheede (1636–1691).

== Colonial period ==
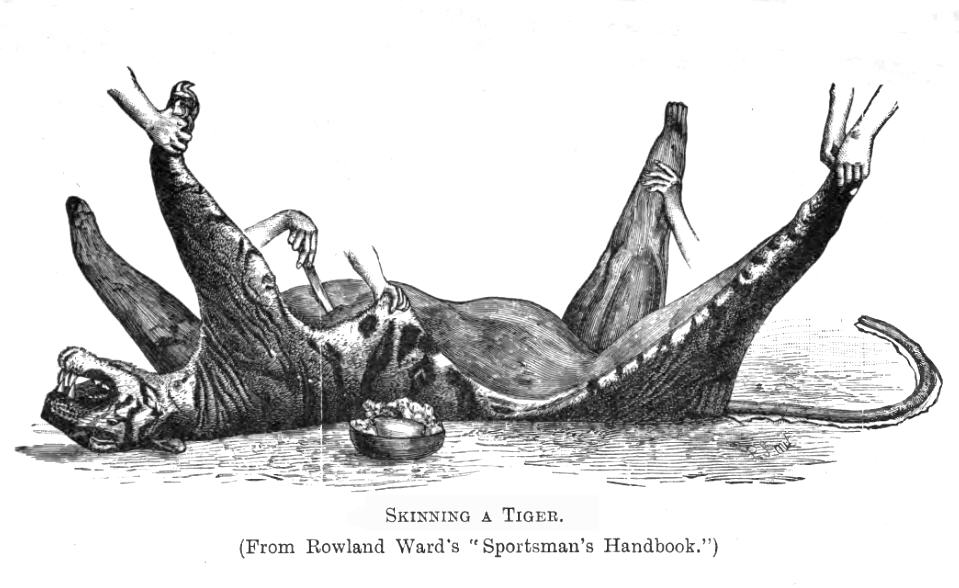
Instructions for tiger skinning

...;and, secondly, that as Great Britain possesses such vast territories in Asia, colonies in Africa and the West Indies, and is now cultivating extensive connections with both North and South America, (not to mention the entire possession of that extensive and interesting country New Holland), a fine opportunity is afforded for forming Collections of rare and beautiful Insects, as well as enriching those already made; and especially as these objects of Natural History are admitted into this country free of all duty. Many persons, therefore, who have been hitherto deterred from consigning to their friends valuable Collections of Insects, may now gratify them at a trifling cost; and we would anxiously impress upon our readers who may visit or reside in foreign countries, the great importance of attending to this subject, as we are persuaded that some of the choicest Collections in England have received their most rare and novel specimens from such well-timed and pleasing donations.

— Preface in Samouelle's 1826 guide to collection

With cabinets of curiosity already popular in European homes, trade and movement of natural history specimens around the world grew with the growth of shipping. The East India Company was quick to note the interest in natural curiosities and set up the first museum in London. The collections grew rapidly. With the establishment of colonies in India, there were also attempts to set up menageries in India. An early attempt was the Barrackpore menagerie established by Richard Wellesley in 1801 through the Institution for Promoting the Natural History of India.

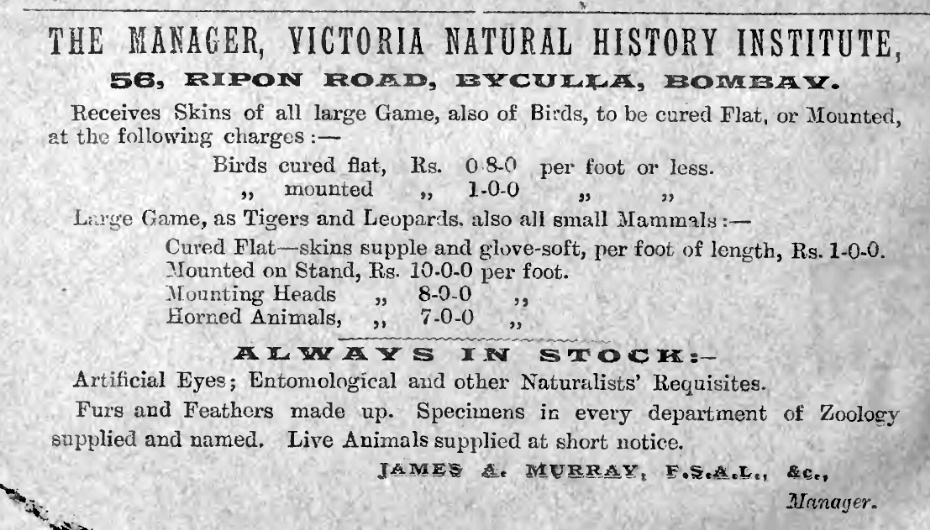
Taxidermy services advertisement, 1888

The Indian Civil Services, whose selection procedure included tests in the knowledge of botany, zoology and geology, brought many British naturalists to India. Some collected species on behalf of British and other European naturalists and museums, while others carried out their studies entirely on their own. Historians have linked the birth of museums to colonialism. These massive collections and their documentation led to the production of numerous works including The Fauna of British India, Including Ceylon and Burma series.

The earliest effort to document the fauna of India was perhaps that of Thomas Hardwicke (1755–1835), a military officer in India who hired local artists to produce a huge collection of illustrations of Indian animals. This was subsequently studied by John Edward Gray (1800–1875) and led to the publication of Illustrations of Indian zoology: chiefly selected from the collection of Major-General Hardwicke and consisted of 202 colour plates.

A large and growing number of naturalists with an interest in sharing observations led to the founding of the Bombay Natural History Society in 1883.

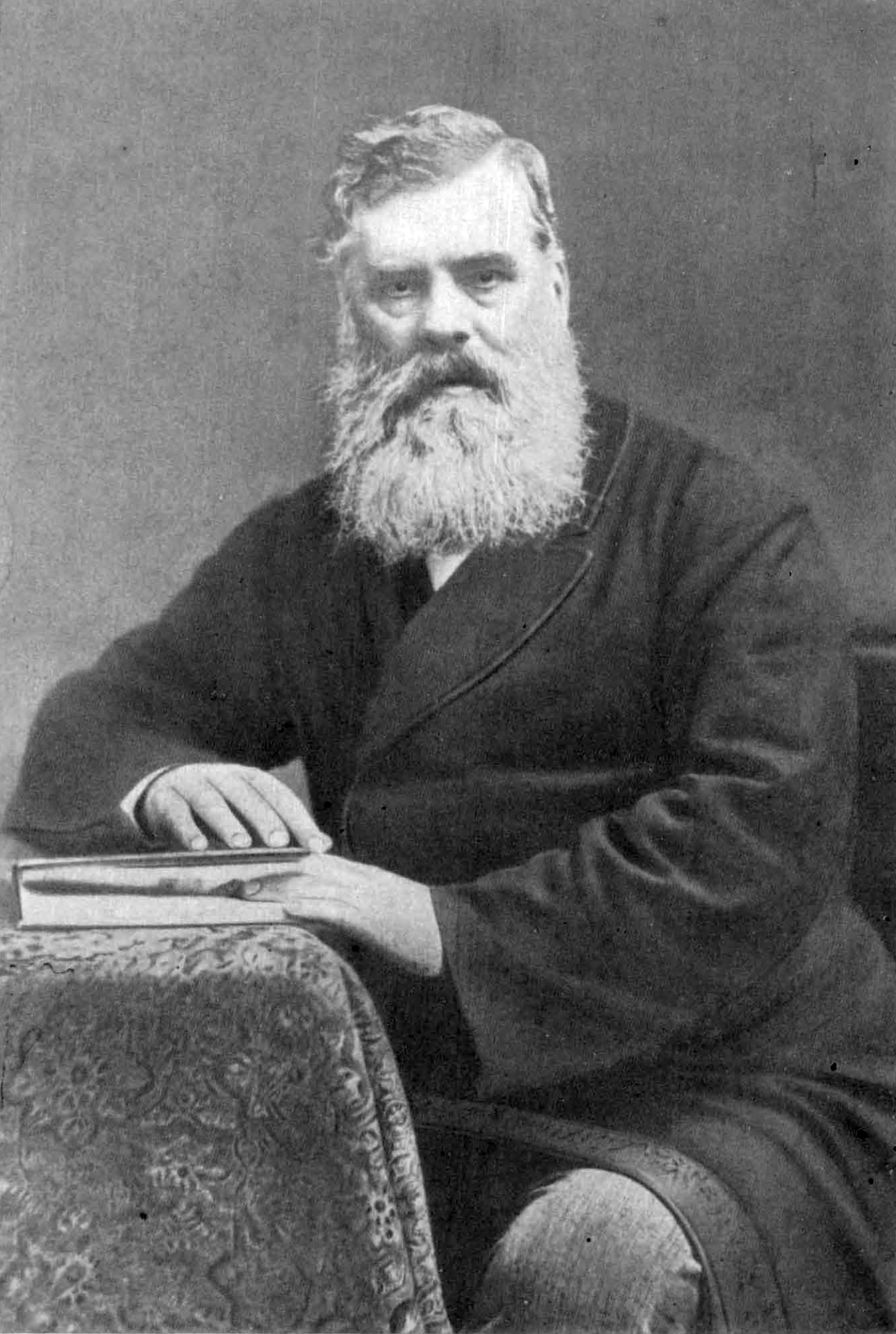
Thomas Oldham (1816–1878)

During this era many Indian princes also took to large scale hunting and together with British hunters, many species of wildlife were hunted to near extinction while some species such as the Cheetah became extinct.

=== Paleontology ===
The study of geology was of great interest during the colonial period. Rich coal bearing seams, gold and other minerals became much sought after resources. This led to the formation of the Geological Survey of India, the first superintendent of which was Thomas Oldham (1816–1878). With his interest in fossils, especially after his discovery of Oldhamia, he took considerable interest in the palaeontological aspects of India. He recruited Ferdinand Stoliczka to work on the Jurassic beds of Kutch. The work of this generation of geologists led to globally significant discoveries including support for continental drift and the idea of a Gondwana supercontinent.

=== Birds ===
A timeline of Indian ornithology

The study of birds in India during the colonial period began with hunting and it was only later that more careful observations were made. Many civil servants and army officers took an interest in hunting for sport and often made notes on the birds that they shot while some of the more interesting species were skinned and sent back to museums in England for identification.

Early studies were made by Major Franklin in 1831 (Proc. Zool. Soc., 1831) followed by Colonel W. H. Sykes with a Catalogue of the Birds of the Bombay Deccan (Proc. Zool. Soc., 1832) and Samuel Tickell with a List of the Birds of Borabhum and Dholbum (Journal. Asiat. Society, 1833). Most of the identification work was however done back in England.

Local systematic ornithology began with Thomas C. Jerdon (1811–1872) in southern India and later Allan Octavian Hume (1829–1912) who established a network of ornithologists in India, with the help of an ornithological journal for the region, Stray Feathers, in which he described new species and edited notes from contributors across the region.

The large and widespread collection efforts of ornithologists spread around the region were deposited in the British Museum and in 1889, Blanford commented on the importance of the collection for Indian ornithology:

...But, above all, Mr. Hume brought together, chiefly in about ten years (from 1872 to 1882), a collection of Indian birds from all parts of the country far superior to any ever before accumulated; indeed it is doubtful whether an equally complete collection has ever before been made, from a similar area, in any branch of Zoology or Botany. The whole of this collection, amounting to 60,000 skins, besides a very large number of nests and eggs, has now been presented by Mr. Hume to the British Museum; and as the same building contains the collections of Colonel Sykes, the Marquis of Tweeddale (Viscount Walden), Mr. Gould, and, above all, of Mr. Hodgson, the opportunities now offered for the study of Indian birds in London are far superior to those that have ever been presented to students in India.

— W. T. Blanford in the preface to The Fauna of British India, Including Ceylon and Burma. Birds, volume 1, by E. W. Oates, 1889

The famous names in the ornithology of the Indian subcontinent during this era include

- Andrew Leith Adams (1827–1882),
- Edward Blyth (1810–1873),
- Edward Arthur Butler (1843–1916),
- Douglas Dewar (1875–1957),
- N. F. Frome (1899–1982),
- Hugh Whistler (1889–1943)
- H. H. Godwin-Austen (1834–1923)
- Col. W. H. Sykes(1790–1872)
- C. M. Inglis (1870–1954)
- Frank Ludlow (1885–1972)
- E. C. Stuart Baker (1864–1944)
- Henry Edwin Barnes (1848–1896)
- F. N. Betts (1906–1973)
- H. R. Baker (1869-1949)
- W. E. Brooks (1828–1899)
- Margaret Cockburn (1829–1928)
- James A. Murray
- E. W. Oates (1845–1911)
- Ferdinand Stoliczka (1838–1874)
- Valentine Ball (1843–1894)
- W. T. Blanford (1832–1905)
- J. K. Stanford (1892–1971)
- Charles Swinhoe (1836–1923)
- Robert Swinhoe (1836–1877)
- C. H. T. Marshall (1841–1927)
- G. F. L. Marshall (1843–1934)
- R. S. P. Bates (1897–1961)
- James Franklin (1783–1834)
- Satya Churn Law
- Arthur Edward Osmaston (1885–1961)
- Bertram Beresford Osmaston (1868–1961)
- Wardlaw Ramsay (1852–1921)
- Samuel Tickell (1811–1875).

Several comprehensive works were written by Jerdon, Hume, Marshall and E. C. S. Baker. Popular works were also written by Frank Finn, Douglas Dewar and Hugh Whistler. Those who joined the Indian Civil Services in later years had access to these works and this period was mostly dominated by their short notes in journals published by organisations such as the BNHS, Asiatic Society and the BOU.

=== Mammals ===
Like the birds, the study of mammals was largely driven by hunters and for a while it was largely restricted to trophy hunting. It was perhaps when R. C. Wroughton, a forest officer who began a concerted study of the small mammals of India through the network of members of the Bombay Natural History Society, that mammalogy in India began in real earnest. He was initially interested in Hymenoptera, especially ants and later scorpions. His interest in scorpions led him to R. I. Pocock. At the time, Pocock was in charge of the Arachnida although he was interested in mammals. Attempts to start a large scale collection effort did not take off. In 1904 Captain Glen Liston of the Indian Medical Service read a paper on Plague, Rats and Fleas in which he noted the lack of information on rodents. Another paper by Dr Hossack of the plague department appeared. This interest in plague suddenly enabled the BNHS to raise funds for collection of small mammals. While hunters sent in many specimens for identification, there were a few who studied the habits of species in the wild. A major study of the rodents and bats was conducted by George Edward Dobson (1848–1895) a medical doctor by profession. Other notable mammalologists included Richard Lydekker (1849–1915), Robert Armitage Sterndale, Stanley Henry Prater (1890–1960) and Brian Houghton Hodgson (1800–1894). Richard Lydekker worked with the Geological survey of India and his primary focus during the period was on the fossil mammals of India.

Live animals were sent from India to collections in Britain. The famous rhinoceros Clara came from Assam through the Nawab of Dhaka to Jan_Albert_Sichterman. Two rhinoceroses were sent from Chittagong in 1872 at the cost of £1,250. The Indian aristocracy who maintained their own menageries became contributors to such collections. Rajah Rajendra Mullick of Calcutta was made a Corresponding Member of the Zoological Society of London around 1860. In 1901 His Highness Sir Prabhu Narani Singh, Bahadur, G.C.I.E., Maharajah of Benares, who promised a supply of Indian elephants when required was elected an Honorary Member of the Society.

Some work was also done on captive animals in the few zoos of the time. The foremost among these zoos was Alipore Zoological Gardens and significant work in captive breeding was done by the first superintendent of the zoo, Ram Brahma Sanyal (1858–1908).

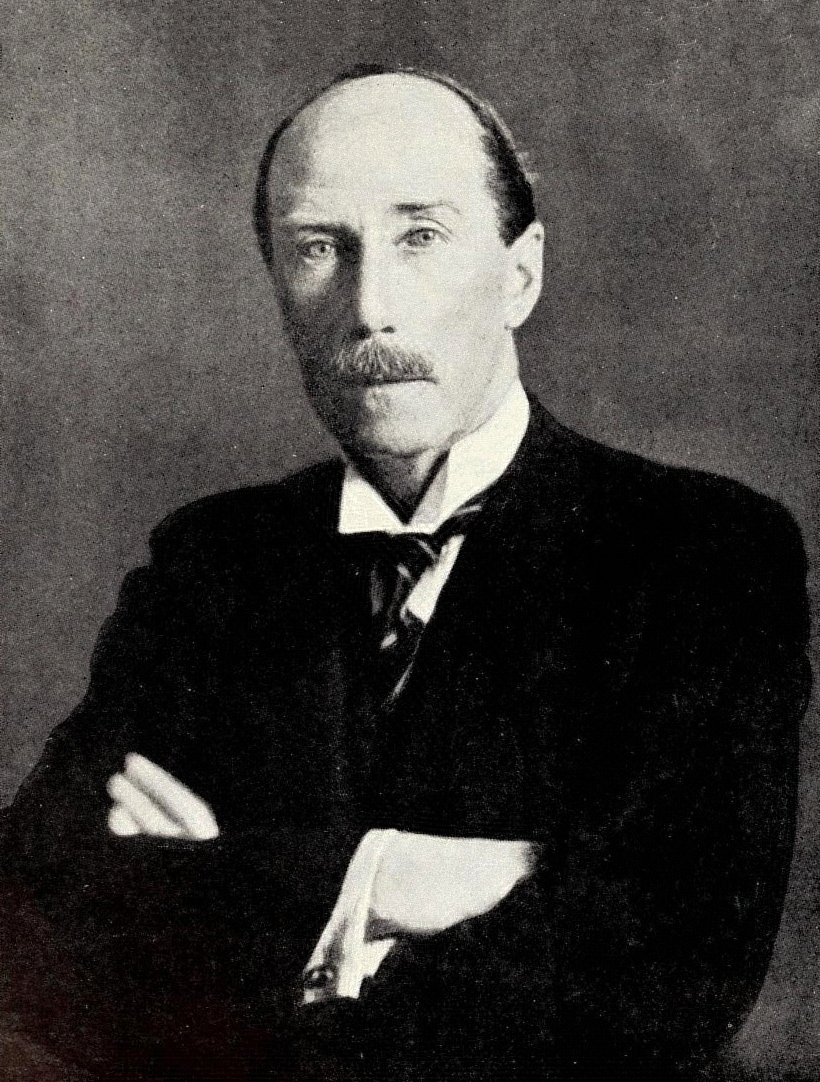
Walter Samuel Millard (1864–1952)

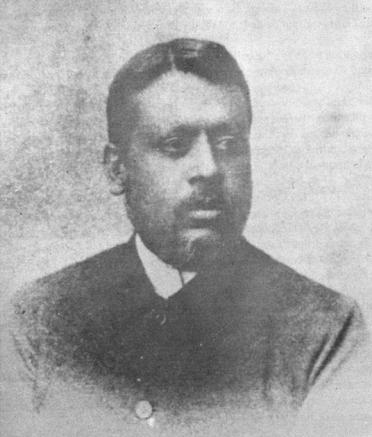
Ram Brahma Sanyal (1858–1908)

=== Reptiles and amphibians ===
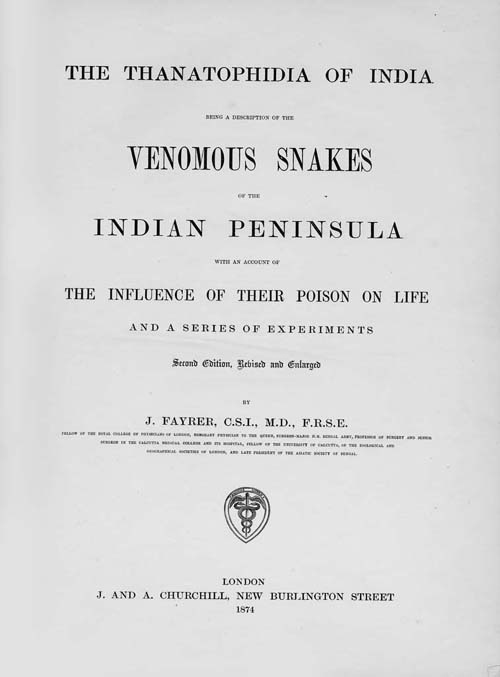
Cover of book on venomous snakes by Sir Joseph Fayrer

The study of reptiles and amphibians were not as advanced as those of the mammals and birds. Only the poisonous reptiles were of some interest to the British army and the attached physicians. Major contributions to the study of species and their distributions were made by Patrick Russell (1726–1805), the father of Indian ophiology, Colonel R. H. Beddome (1830–1911), Frank Wall (1868–1950), Joseph Fayrer (1824–1907) and H. S. Ferguson (1852–1921).

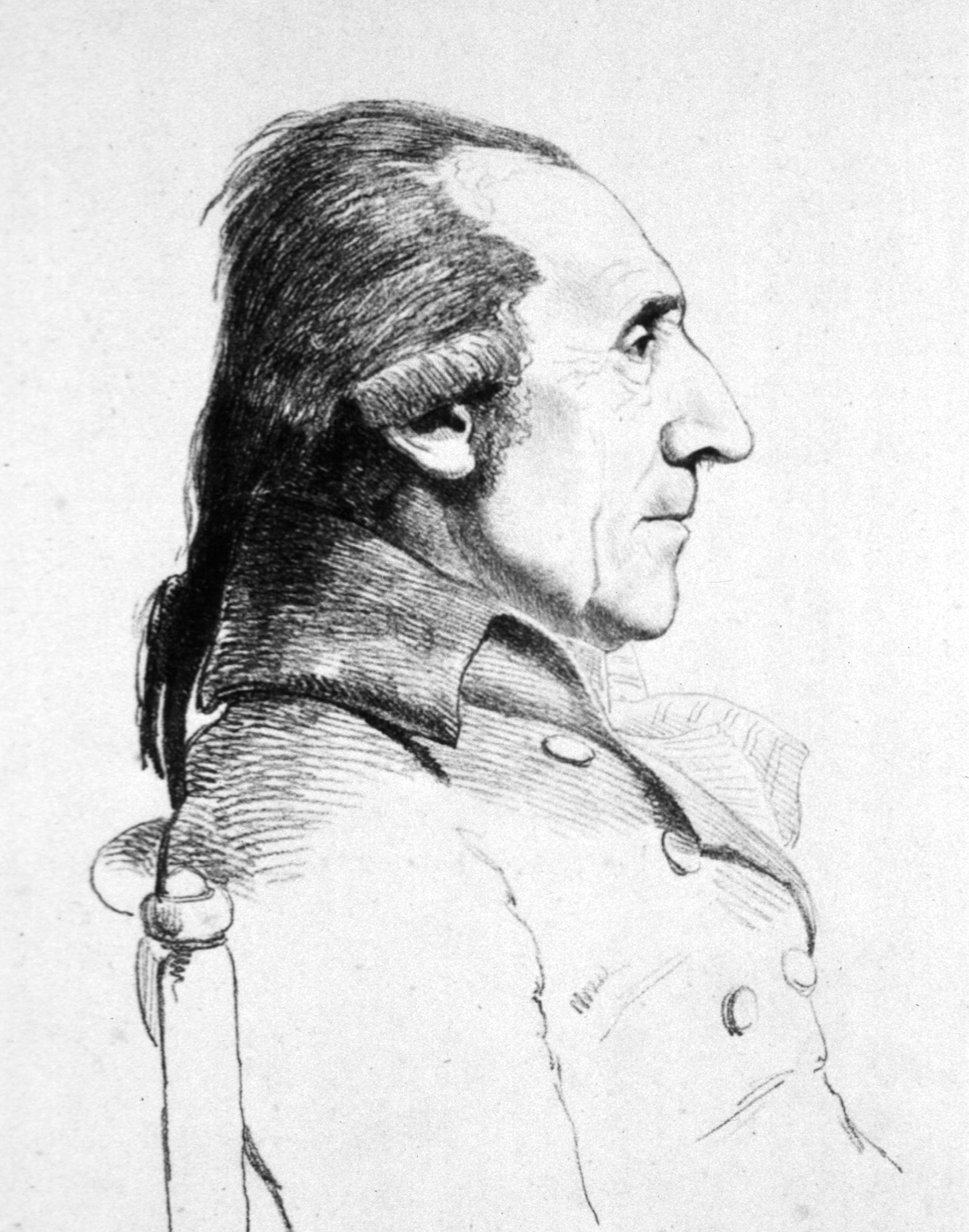
Patrick Russell (1726–1805)

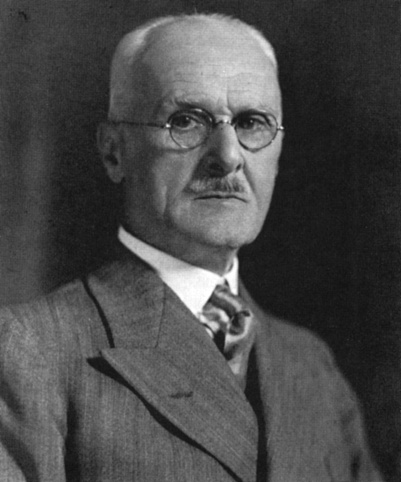
Frank Wall (1868–1950)

=== Invertebrates ===
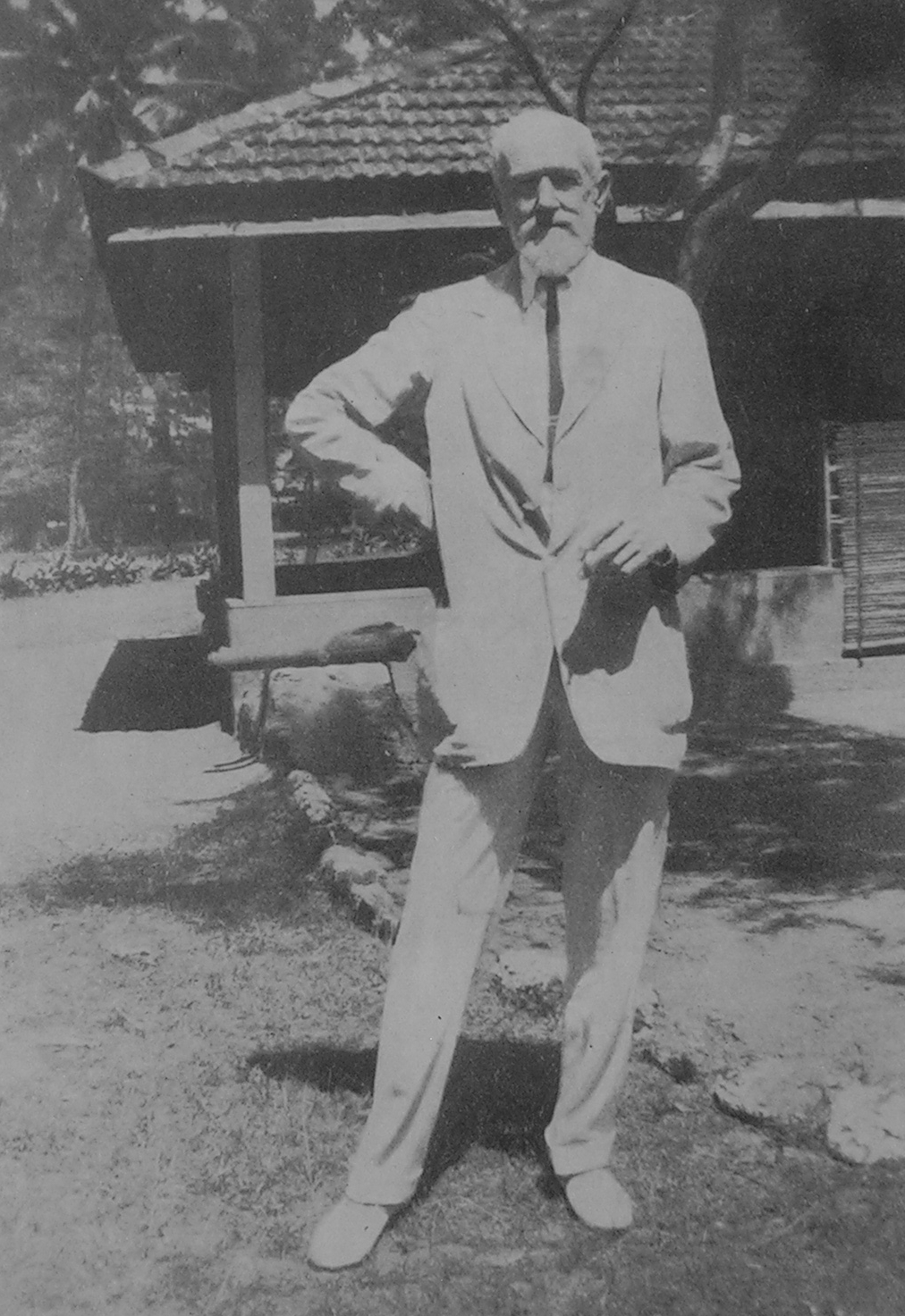
T. R. D. Bell (1863–1948)

The earliest entomological studies in India were on termites in 1779 by Koenig and lac (1781 by James Kerr) insects. The amateur study of insects in India was initially restricted to the butterflies thanks to the collection craze back in England. An early example being Edward Donovan's An epitome of the insects of India. A great number army officers and civil servants maintained collections. Sir Winston Churchill for instance made a small collection of 65 butterfly species during a short stint in Bangalore. Lepidopterists include Edward Yerbury Watson (?–1897) who took an interest in the Hesperiidae, Mark Alexander Wynter-Blyth (1906–1963), T. R. Bell (1863–1948) and Charles B. Antram (1864–1955). However entomology beyond butterfly collection gained importance due to the growing economic importance of agriculture. The position of an Imperial Entomologist was created at the Imperial Agricultural Research Institute (later the Indian Agricultural Research Institute). Entomologists who left a mark include William Stephen Atkinson (1820–1876), E. Brunetti (1862–1927), Thomas Bainbrigge Fletcher (1878–1950), Sir George Hampson (1860–1936), H. E. Andrewes (1863–1950), G. M. Henry (1891–1983), Colonel C. T. Bingham (1848–1908), William Monad Crawford (1872–1941), W. H. Evans (1876–1956), Michael Lloyd Ferrar, F. C. Fraser (1880–1963), Harold Maxwell-Lefroy (1877–1925), Frederic Moore (1830–1907), Samarendra Maulik (1881–1950), Lionel de Nicéville (1852–1901), Ronald A. Senior-White ( 1891–1954), Edwin Felix Thomas Atkinson (1840–1890) and Charles Swinhoe (1836–1923). With forests being of major economic value, there was an interest in forest entomology. Forest entomology started with E. P. Stebbing (1870–1960) and he was followed by many including A. D. Imms (1880–1949), who is better known for his entomology textbook that continues with new revisions to remain a standard reference. Other entomologists associated with forest entomology included C. F. C. Beeson. Malaria was a widespread disease and studies on mosquitoes gained special importance. Ronald Ross (1857–1932) established the link between mosquitoes and malaria during his researches when positioned at Bangalore, Ootacamund and Secunderabad. Sir S. R. Christophers (1873–1978) pioneered in the study of mosquitoes and was involved in the creation of the Malaria Survey of India. Others involved in this field included J. A. Sinton (1884–1956).

There was also considerable interest in molluscs partly due to their importance in palaeontology and also due to the economic importance of the damage they caused to ships. Work on these areas was carried out by several malacologists including Baini Prashad.

=== Fish ===
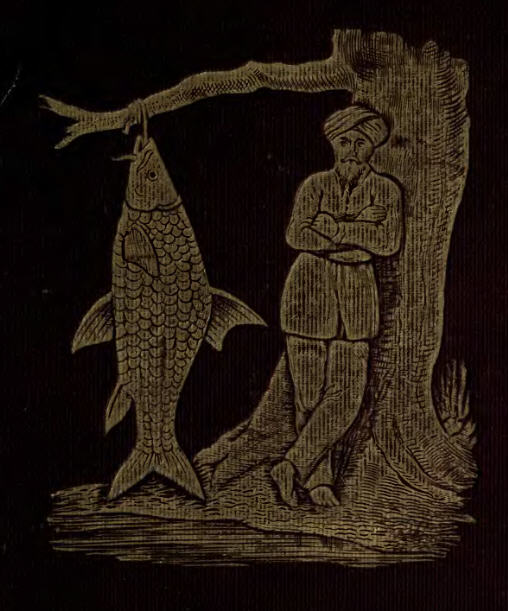
Cover of the Rod in India by H S Thomas, 1897

The study of fish in India was also initially restricted to that which was of commercial value. Sport fishing was also popular but restricted to major hill areas. Not much is documented of the sport fishing beyond record catches reported in the Journal of the Bombay Natural History Society. Notable publications on the fishes of India were made by Sir Francis Day (1829–1889), Captain Robert Cecil Beavan (1841–1870) and Francis Buchanan-Hamilton (1762–1829). Some works on sport fishing were also published with several notable works by Henry Sullivan Thomas.

=== Flora and forests ===
The forests of India were some of the richest resources in the British colonies. The value of forests was realised very early and forest management was introduced early on the sub-continent. The links between water, climate and forest cover were noted particularly early and warnings on deforestation were sounded as early as 1840 by surgeons in the East India Company like Edward Balfour. This was to lead to forest conservation measures although the later policies of forest management were aimed at the production of commercial products such as teak timber. The post of a conservationist was created and this term was related to the patches of forests that they managed, called conservancies, and was not related to biodiversity conservation. Even today, vast tracts of Indian forests are covered with teak plantations, low in biodiversity and seasonally ravaged by forest fires. The first foresters in India were highly influenced by forest management in Germany and many forest officers in India were trained in the German school of thought brought into India by Dietrich Brandis (1824–1907)-the father of tropical forestry. Numerous officers including James Sykes Gamble (1847–1925), Alexander Gibson and Hugh Francis Cleghorn in the Indian Forest service added information on the flora of India. Several amateurs also worked alongside from other civil services and they were assisted by professional botanists such as Joseph Dalton Hooker (1817–1911), John Gerard Koenig (1728–1785), Robert Wight (1796–1872), Nathaniel Wallich (1786–1854) and William Roxburgh (1751–1815), the Father of Indian Botany. Another area of interest was the introduction of plants of economic importance to India. Many of these introductions were tried in botanical gardens at Sibpur, Poona, Madras and Saharanpur. The Chinese monopoly on tea was ended when tea was introduced in Darjeeling and Sri Lanka through the work of Robert Fortune (1812–1880). The botanical garden at Sibpur in Calcutta was started in 1787 by Col. Robert Kyd (1746–1793). Sir George King (1840–1904) who was in charge of the garden from 1871 was instrumental in the creation of a herbarium at the garden and founded the Botanical Survey of India in 1890. Later botanical workers include the paleobotanist Birbal Sahni (1891–1949).

Some of the other prominent names associated with botany and forests of India include William Carey (1761–1834), Sir Henry Collett (1836–1901), Ethelbert Blatter (1877—1934), T. F. Bourdillon, Sir Harry Champion and his brother F. W. Champion (1893–1970), A. A. Dunbar-Brander (Conservator of Forests in the Central Provinces), Sir Walter Elliot (1803–1887), Henry Thomas Colebrooke (1765–1837), Charles McCann (1899–1980), Hugh Falconer( 1808–1865), Philip Furley Fyson (1877–1947), Lt. Col. Heber Drury, William Griffith (1810–1845), Sir David Prain (1857–1944), J. F. Duthie, P. D. Stracey, Richard Strachey (1817–1908), Thomas Thomson (1817–1878), J. E. Winterbottom, W. Moorcroft and J.F. Royle (1799–1858). Naturalists associated with the Bombay Natural History Society like W. S. Millard (1864–1952) helped popularise the study of trees with books such as Some Beautiful Indian Trees (coauthored with Ethelbert Blatter). Similar attempts were made by civil servants like Alexander Kyd Nairne in his Flowering plants of Western India (1894).

Several herbaria were created during this time and one of the largest and still surviving ones is the Blatter Herbarium.

=== Hunter-naturalists ===
Hunting was a way of life in colonial India and people from different walks of life wrote about their hunts and their observations in the wild. Many of them were talented writers who left behind their hunting lore in various publications. These include Kenneth Anderson (1910–1974) and Douglas Hamilton (1818–1892) in southern India, F. M. Bailey (1882–1967) and Major R. W. G. Hingston (1887–1966) in the Himalayas, Jim Corbett (1875–1955) in the foothills of the Himalayas, R. C. Morris (1894–1977) in the Biligirirangan Hills and George P. Sanderson in central India. Lieutenant Colonel R. W. Burton along with Colonel R. C. Morris, later became involved in conservation and participated in the early discussions of the Indian Board for Wildlife. There were also much travelled hunters like Richard Meinertzhagen (1878–1967) who contributed to various other fields such as ornithology. Numerous other hunters wrote to the BNHS journal and not all of their observations were accurate.

=== Travelling naturalists and collectors ===
India was on the route for explorers and travellers in the region and many collectors from different countries travelled through India. These include such naturalists as Jean de Thévenot (1633–1667), Pierre Sonnerat (1748–1814), Jean Baptiste Leschenault de la Tour (1773–1826), Alfred Duvaucel (1793–1825), William Doherty (1857–1901), Victor Jacquemont (1801–1832) and Frank Kingdon-Ward (1885–1958).

=== Popularizers ===
There were a few naturalists who were especially gifted writers and made the study of natural history immensely more popular. The foremost among these writers was Edward Hamilton Aitken (1851–1909) who wrote under the pen name of Eha. The novelist Rudyard Kipling (1865–1936) also captured the imagination of many with The Jungle Book. Others like H. M. Phipson (1850–1936) helped build organisations like the BNHS and museums such as the Prince of Wales Museum of Western India.

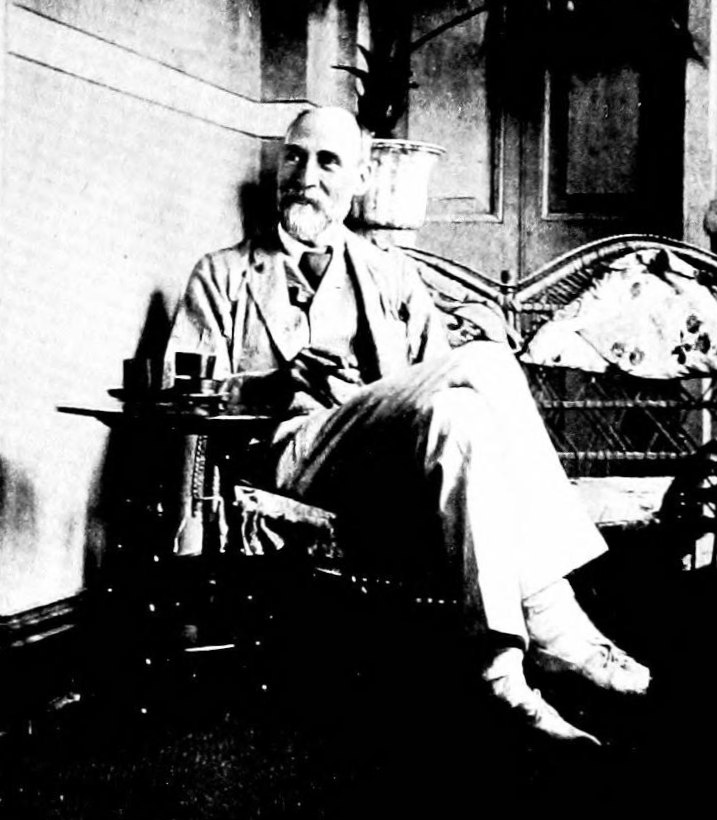
Edward Hamilton Aitken (1851–1909)

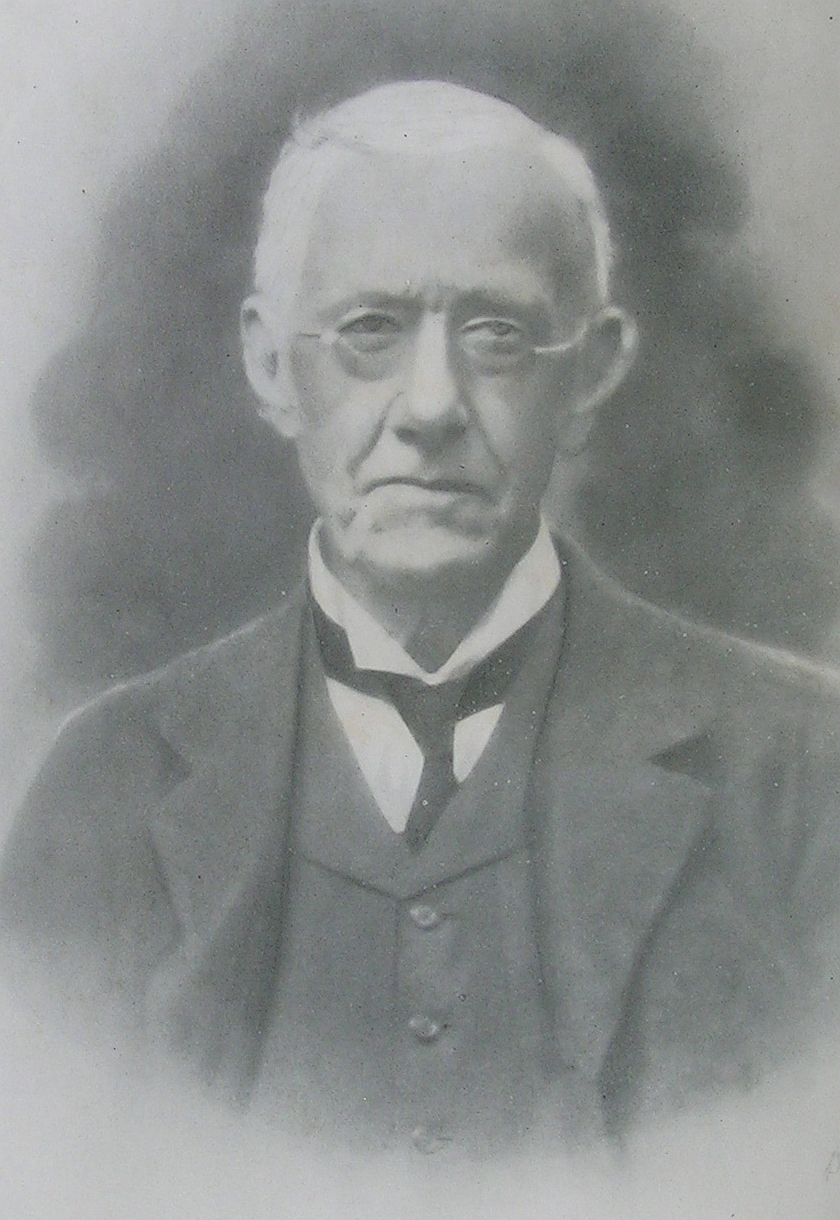
Herbert Musgrave Phipson (1850–1936)

=== Museum workers ===
Several museums were started in India including one at the Asiatic Society in Calcutta. There were also many who worked in the British Museum in London and received specimens collected from India. They made significant contributions by their publications. Edward Blyth (1810–1873) and Nelson Annandale (1876–1924) made great contributions working out of the Asiatic Society while Sir Norman Boyd Kinnear (1882–1957) worked at the BNHS. Other notable museum curators and workers include Alfred William Alcock (1859–1933), John Anderson (1833–1900), George Albert Boulenger (1858–1937), W. L. Distant (1845–1922), Frederic Henry Gravely (1885–?), John Gould (1804–1881), Albert C. L. G. Günther (1830–1914), Frank Finn (1868–1932), Charles McFarlane Inglis (1870–1954), Stanley Wells Kemp (1882–1945), James Wood-Mason (1846–1893), Reginald Innes Pocock (1863–1947), Richard Bowdler Sharpe (1847–1909), Malcolm A. Smith (1875–1958) and Nathaniel Wallich (1786–1854).

== Post-Independence (1947–1970) ==
=== Ornithologists ===
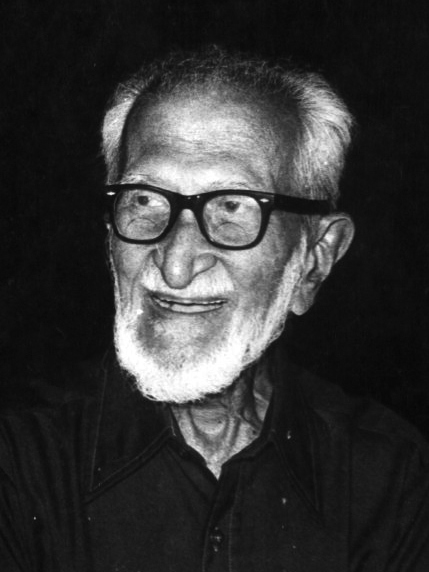
Salim Ali (1896–1987)

Post independence ornithology was dominated by Salim Ali and his cousin Humayun Abdulali who worked with the Bombay Natural History Society. Salim Ali worked with American collaborators like Sidney Dillon Ripley and Walter Norman Koelz to produce what is still the most comprehensive handbook of Indian ornithology. Another major contribution was the introduction of field ornithology and pioneers included Horace Alexander. The Zoological Survey of India also conducted its own collection surveys and they were led by Biswamoy Biswas. Eastern India and Burma was covered by ornithologists like Bertram E. Smythies.

=== Entomologists ===
The tradition of entomology started in the colonial era continued with numerous entomologists especially specialising on economically important insects (mostly pests). Notable entomologists of this era include M. S. Mani and B. K. Tikader. The latter contributed greatly to Indian arachnology.

=== Ichthyologists ===
One of the foremost ichthyologist of India was Sunderlal Hora, famous for his Satpura hypothesis a biogeographical hypothesis based on his observations on the adaptations of hill stream fishes. P. R. Awati and D. V. Bal worked on marine fishes of the Western Coastal Plains. Other prominent ichthyologists included C. V. Kulkarni and S. B. Setna.

=== Herpetologists ===
C. R. Narayan Rao worked on the frogs of southern India. Romulus Whitaker and J. C. Daniel studied various aspects of the reptile fauna of India.

=== Scientists from other disciplines ===
A large number of scientists from various other fields contributed to the study of plants and animals in India. Among these were some who worked in interdisciplinary areas. Foremost among these was J. B. S. Haldane, the British scientist who encouraged field biology in India on the basis that it was useful while at the same time requiring low investment unlike other branches of science. He was among the first to popularise quantitative approaches to biology in India.

=== Popularizers ===
Natural history in India was made more popular through publications in the mass media. In southern India M. Krishnan who was a pioneering black-and-white wildlife photographer and artist wrote articles on various aspects of natural history in Tamil and English. His articles were well illustrated with his photographs and artwork. He wrote in a humorous style much like that of EHA before him. Professor K. K. Neelakantan was another writer who popularised the study of birds in Kerala by writing books and articles in Malayalam. Others like Harry Miller wrote in English in the local newspapers. Some others like Ruskin Bond wrote about the wilderness, the hills and the wildlife in a more romantic style.

Zafar Futehally started the first birdwatchers' newsletter in the 1950s and this helped network the birdwatcher community spread across India. Of this newsletter, Horace Alexander wrote:

Now, twenty-five years after independence, the delightful Bulletin for Birdwatchers, produced each month by Zafar Futehally is mainly written by Indian ornithologists: and the western names that appear among its contributors are not all British.

Wildlife photography has also helped in popularizing natural history. Numerous photographers have contributed to this and prominent names include Loke Wan Tho, E. Hanumantha Rao, M. Krishnan and T. N. A. Perumal. They followed in the footsteps of the early pioneers of photography such as E. H. N. Lowther, O. C. Edwards and F. W. Champion.

=== Conservationists ===
In the post-independence era the urgent need to preserve the little remaining wildlife was realised by the politicians of the time. Conservationists of fame included E. P. Gee (1904–1968) who worked on the Indian Board of Wildlife. In later times, large numbers of people became involved in conservation and its various aspects – scientific, social, legal and political. (See also Conservation movement)
