= Kenneth Anderson (writer) =

Anglo-Indian conservationist, hunter, author (1910–1974)

- Kenneth Anderson and his pariah dog Nipper, adopted on one of his hunts
- Born: 8 March 1910; Bolarum, Hyderabad State, British India
- Died: 30 August 1974 (aged 64); Bangalore, Karnataka, India
- Occupations: Manager, Author
- Spouse: Blossom Minnette Fleming
- Children: Margaret June Blossom Lucy Anderson (born 19 June 1930); Donald Malcolm Stuart Anderson (18 February 1934 – 12 July 2014)
- Writing career
- Subjects: Wildlife, Man-eater hunting, Big-game hunting

Kenneth Douglas Stewart Anderson (8 March 1910 – 30 August 1974), known primarily as Kenneth Anderson or as KDS Anderson, was a Scottish-Indian writer, nature enthusiast, conservationist, and ethical hunter who lived and worked in South India. He authored highly-regarded books based on his experiences hiking, camping, and hunting in the Indian jungles.

Anderson initially gained fame around Bangalore as an outstanding hunter of high ethics. Later, his brave and skilful hunting of menacing man-eater leopards and tigers throughout South India earned him the nickname Corbett of the South, in reference to his older North Indian counterpart Jim Corbett. In mid-20th century, alarmed and disheartened by the destruction of wildlife, he pleaded for the preservation of flora and fauna of the forests in all regions of India. As an ex-hunter expert on wild animals' behaviour, he was a trailblazer in wildlife tourism in Bangalore, and is admired as a pioneer conservationist in southern India.

== Biography ==
=== Early life ===
Kenneth Anderson was born on 8 March 1910 in the Bolarum area of Secunderabad, in the princely state of Hyderabad in British India. He belonged to a Scottish family that had lived in India for many generations, and were originally from Glasgow. He was baptised at the Holy Trinity Church, Bolarum, and was the only child of his parents. He was often called "Jock" by his family and friends. His father, Douglas Stuart Anderson, was the eldest of four children, and was born in Calcutta but brought up in Bolarum. His mother, Lucy Ann Taylor (née Bailey), grew up with her two aunts in Bangalore after her mother died due to cholera, and later, her father left Madras for Belfast as his Irish regiment of the British Army left India.

Douglas was an officer in the British Indian Army in the military accounts section. The family moved to Bangalore during World War I. They started living in the house of Lucy's maternal grandfather John Taylor, who, for his services to the Mysore Commission, had been gifted land in Bangalore adjacent to the Cubbon Park by Sir Mark Cubbon, the British Commissioner. Lucy became the head of the choir of St Mark's Cathedral, where they had married in 1908. Douglas used to go waterfowl hunting with his friends in the lakes and tanks around Bangalore, and influenced Kenneth regarding the outdoors.

=== Education ===
Anderson went to Bishop Cotton Boys' School, and then to St Joseph's European High School, successfully passing the Senior Cambridge examinations in 1926. He was sent to study law at Edinburgh under the guardianship of his uncle Forbes, but abandoned his studies and returned to India in 1928. He was well-versed in Kannada, the language of his hometown, and Tamil, the language of the neighbouring province. He had also picked up a little bit of Telugu, Hindi, and Urdu during his early years in Hyderabad State. He was known to be an intelligent man, and throughout his life he remained an academically inclined avid reader, not limited by subjects or topics.

=== Career ===
He worked for fifteen years in the Posts & Telegraphs Department. (Note: Anderson worked at the P&T Building, also known as the Central Telegraph Office, at the Minsk Square near the General Post Office, Bangalore. Its facade was partially demolished in 2013 to construct the Entrance D of the Cubbon Park Metro Station (An Anglo-Indian Archive and Deccan Herald 2016).) Then in 1956 he joined the colloquial British Aircraft Factory (later HAL) (Note: British Aircraft Factory referred to the part of erstwhile Hindustan Aircraft Ltd. (now HAL) which manufactured various British aircraft on licence (Rais Ahmad, IJSP 2016, III(I)/03(03):21–26).) in Bangalore as the Factory Manager for Planning, and retired only in 1972 due to illness. In the 1950s, his books made him an internationally renowned author, and he received considerable royalties thereafter. Despite his efforts, however, he did not find much success as a writer of fiction. In the 1960s, he started taking national or international clients to jungle safaris for wildlife observation, thereby becoming a frontrunner in wildlife tourism in the region. He purchased nearly 200 acres of land across Mysore State, Hyderabad State, and Madras Presidency, at more than twenty locations (near forests) including Pondicherry and Ooty. (Note: Many of Anderson's properties were fully or partially usurped by localities in the late 20th century.) Anderson's correspondence with Rayner Unwin from 1961 hints at a possible joint venture with David Attenborough of BBC, but no work ultimately materialised.

=== Death ===
In 1972 Anderson was diagnosed with prostate cancer. He was treated in St Martha's Hospital in Bangalore, and then in CMC Vellore for Cobalt therapy. However, he could not recover. Later, he was re-admitted to St Martha's where he died on 30 August 1974. He was buried at the Indian Christian Cemetery (Note: Indian Christian Cemetery is also known as the New Protestant Cemetery or the Bangalore (Hosur Road) Cemetery (Rutland Remembers and FIBIS).) on Hosur Road in Bangalore.

== Family ==
=== Marriage ===
Anderson met Blossom Hyacinth Minnette Fleming at the Bowring Club on St Mark's Road in Bangalore. Her mother, Millicent Toussaint, was a Burgher from Ceylon while her father, Clifford Fleming, was a doctor originally from New South Wales, Australia, who worked first in the military and then at Cellular Jail in Andaman Islands. She was born on 20 March 1910 in Port Blair, and her family moved to India when she was ten years old. They married in April 1929 at Sorkalpet in Cuddalore, Tamil Nadu, and honeymooned in Pondicherry. They lived in the sprawling 19th-century bungalow which Anderson got from his mother, named Prospect House (Note: Prospect House was situated near the British-era Cubbon Park Police Station (estd. 1910). The government cancelled Anderson family's ownership in the mid-1980s, and parts of the place now have an HPCL petrol pump, Prestige Group's Obelisk commercial building, among others (Krupa Rajangam, Citizen Matters 2020 and Dakshayini Suresh, Frontline 2025).), a landmark of the city on the 12-acre property on Sydney Road (now Kasturba Road) in Bangalore.

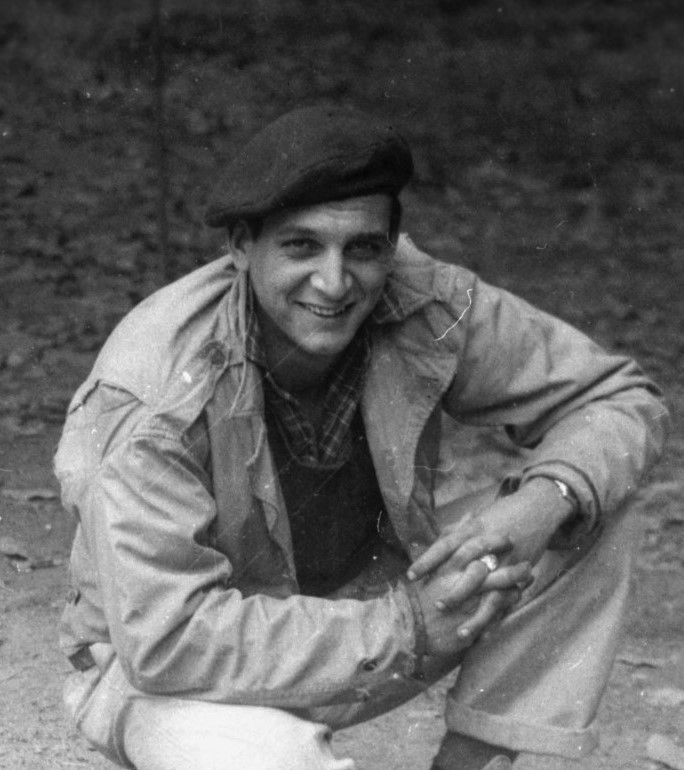
Kenneth's son Donald

The couple separated in later life. In 1962, Kenneth Anderson moved to his other property named Bijou Cottage in Whitefield, while Blossom stayed on at Prospect House. Blossom Minnette Hyacinth Anderson died of pulmonary edema at St Philomena's Hospital on 11 March 1987, and was buried next to her husband.

=== Children ===
They had two children – a daughter named Margaret June Blossom Lucy Anderson (born 19 June 1930), and a son named Donald Malcolm Stuart Anderson (18 February 1934 – 12 July 2014). June Anderson attended Bishop Cotton Girls' School, and cleared the Senior Cambridge exam in 1947. She married Jack Vivian Jones (born 16 November 1927), a British Indian Army officer, and the couple initially lived in Wellington, Fatehgarh, and Ambala. Jack resigned from the military, and they moved to England in 1951, and then ultimately to Perth, Australia in 1964. She has three children – sons Don and Chris born in India, and daughter Jackie born in Basildon.

Donald Anderson studied in Bishop Cotton Boys' School where he took classes of Oswald C. Edwards (18 October 1907 – 26 October 1988), the pioneer nature photographer of India. He worked for more than two decades at the Bangalore Cotton, Silk and Woolen Mills. He became a prolific hunter and angler. Later, he left hunting, and assisted the efforts of Wildlife Association of South India in saving the Cauvery Mahseer. He decided to stay in India post-independence, never married, and died at the age of 80 in Bangalore.

== Outdoorsmanship ==
Anderson, since his childhood, was fascinated by animals of all kinds whether mammals, birds, reptiles, or insects. He acquainted himself with them, and keenly studied their behaviour. He started frequently visiting the jungles near Bangalore for hiking or overnight camping. The sport of hunting attracted him with which he was already acquainted due to his father. Post marriage, he even took his family along on many of his trips. At his home, Prospect House, he had a multitude of animals like hyena, cobras, sloth bear, geese, etc. (Note: Anderson family's prominent pets were "Jackie" the hyena, "Bruno" the sloth bear, "Ivan" the bar-headed goose, and two ponies for children: "Judy" for June and "Nelson" for Donald.)

=== Hunting ===
Anderson took to big-game hunting with his second-hand Winchester Model 1895 rifle chambered for the .405 WCF cartridge. He became a hunter extraordinaire with exceptional monitoring and tracking skills, and became famous for his jungle knowledge. His behaviour on hunting trips was highly principled and strictly adhered to the widely accepted code of hunting ethics. (Note: The Hunter's Ethical Code includes principles like fair chase, quick-&-clean kill-shot, track-&-despatch of wounded, legal compliance, etc.) This led to him being recognised as an epitome of a Gentleman Shikari (Note: The term Gentleman Shikari was used for highly ethical hunters who were mostly White Britishers (or other prominent people).) ("shikari" means "hunter" in Hindustani language). Anderson used to refer to these excursions as his Hunting Escapades. For his preservation-worthy trophy kills, he used the services of Tocher and Tocher Taxidermists.

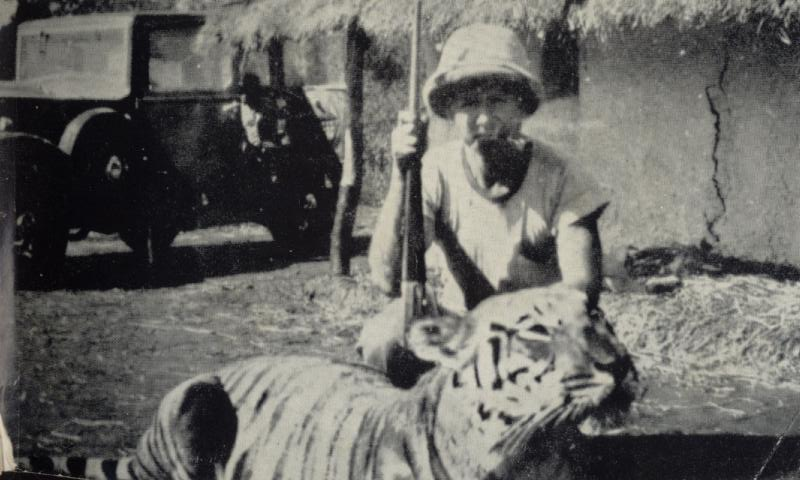
Kenneth Anderson with the Tigress of Jowlagiri.

His competence and bravery in dealing with carnivora ultimately allowed him to pursue a particular high-risk activity in the public interest, that of eliminating man-eaters and rogues which were terrorising the common populace. He excelled in these undertakings, and was sought after and often desperately invited by government officials for such tasks. Anderson neutralised some of the most notorious man-eaters in recorded history, like the Leopard of Gummalapur, Sloth-bear of Mysore, Tigress of Jowlagiri, etc.

Anderson is formally credited with having shot 8 man-eating leopards (7 males and 1 female), and 7 tigers (5 males and 2 females) from 1939 to 1966, as per government records. Though, he is known to have unofficially shot many more as he was in many instances personally invited by local people or alerted by his own network of informants, often without government's involvement or knowledge. This also means that he was able to nip several man-eaters in the bud just after the first few tiger attacks (or leopard attacks) before they could kill a substantial number of human beings. In those days the man-eater attacks were not covered in newspapers or media, and Anderson's network and skills empowered him to kill them before they could garner wider notoriety.

=== Conservation ===
"For the sportsmen of the future I strongly recommend the camera, instead of the rifle. It can give you every bit as much fun..."

— Kenneth Anderson

Anderson stopped hunting, either for sport or trophy, in the second half of his middle age as he became increasingly concerned about the destruction of wildlife and forests in India. He made an exception only for killing man-eaters, and even then he was very judicious and never acted on rumours alone. He slowly turned to wildlife conservation. Anderson publicly highlighted not only the urgent need to do so, but also the flaws and corruption in the Indian system that exacerbated the harm to wildlife. Additionally, he exhorted the sportsmen to give-up hunting and pursue hobbies like wildlife photography. As an avowed nature enthusiast, he continued his lifelong habit of frequently visiting the forests either as a wilderness wanderer or for seeking solitude. He also got his only son, Donald, to promise him to stop hunting altogether, which he did.

"Over time our concept and understanding of the creatures of the forest has changed for the better, but it didn't start suddenly one day. People like Kenneth and Donald Anderson didn't just hunt animals when they visited the jungles; they observed animals and were a source of information that people benefitted from."

— T.N.A. Perumal, FRPS, Award-winning wildlife photographer

He started a personal business of organising jungle safaris for interested parties in forests of India. He would personally steward such trips, and even promoted them for international clients in reputable magazines like the Audubon. This venture was quite successful, and made Anderson one of the earliest entrepreneurs in wildlife tourism in India.

=== Jungle folk ===
Anderson became well acquainted with many jungle folk from various areas and aboriginal tribes. He was most fond of Byra The Poojare from the Poojaree tribe. Others include Ranga who was a petty shikari who also occasionally took to poaching, and Rachen from the Sholaga tribe. Some of his friends such as Hughie Hailstone also had estates in South India, and others became fellow hunters like Eric Newcombe.

== Writing ==
Anderson was a proficient raconteur who penned international bestsellers in the mid-20th century. He is well admired among readers of hunting literature, and his books are considered some of the best in the category. As an author, his style of narration is descriptive as he details his encounters and experiences in the wilderness. His written works reflect his acute powers of observation and his unique sense of humour. Anderson's books were originally published in the 1950s in London by George Allen & Unwin Ltd., and hardcover editions were produced by Rand McNally. His only fiction novel was published by Jaico Publishing House in India in 1969. In 21st century, his forest-related books are being published internationally by Rupa Publications of India.

"He is the professional observer of those that are truly wild,... A forest is for him the enchanting scene of an endless game: to pit his wits and his quick reaction times against the instincts of its denizens in order to find out how they live (and only sometimes to kill them). [...] and as he has won more dangerous duels in this setting than most men of his kind, his books are full of unforced dramatic tension."

— The Times Literary Supplement

Anderson's books highlight his concern for the natural environment and his conservationist streak as a wildlife chronicler. Many books have accounts of his efforts in hunting man-eating big cats, mostly successfully. He also includes details about elephants, bisons, deer, and bears, as well as less popular creatures like Indian Dholes (wild dogs), hyenas, spiders, and snakes. Anderson provides details of the lives of people in or near the Indian jungles of his time, and about poor or non-existent infrastructure. He also delves into the lives of native jungle tribes, mentioning their habits, survival skills, etc.

== Legacy ==
Anderson is considered as one of the foremost nature writers of India, and among the first conservationists in the region. However, observers note that he never got the national fame and official recognition that he deserved. Anderson killed more man-eaters than the more famous Jim Corbett while also operating over a larger area with varied forests and working amongst a more diverse set of people. This was because Corbett received appreciation during the British Raj while later governments neglected Anderson's contributions and often took his services for granted. Also, being 35 years younger than Corbett, Anderson's writings were published after the hunting literature had already peaked.

"My own fascination for jungles of Karnataka was nourished by Kenneth Anderson’s hunting tales. I had sought his friendship a few years before he died, and wandered in these jungles, listening spell-bound to his tales. He had recounted how, after independence, destruction of India’s wildlife and wild lands had accelerated."

— K. Ullas Karanth, Wildlife Conservation Society

Anderson inspired conservationists like K. Ullas Karanth who became Director of WCS Tiger Conservation Program, and many others. His personal land was later (after sale) incorporated by government in the Bannerghatta National Park, where now stands the Butterfly Park of Bannerghatta Zoo. In 2008, a Kenneth Anderson Nature Society was founded by like-minded admirers. Private entities have named outdoor places and activities after him like the Kenneth's Bunker, and Kenneth Anderson Bike Trails.

== Bibliography ==
Hunting books

- Nine Maneaters And One Rogue (1954) ISBN 978-8-1291-1642-0
- Man Eaters and Jungle Killers (1957) ISBN 978-8-1716-7563-0
- The Black Panther of Sivanipalli and Other Adventures of the Indian Jungle (1959) ISBN 978-8-1716-7467-1
- The Call of the Man Eater (1961) ISBN 978-8-1716-7469-5
- This is the Jungle (1964) ISBN 978-8-1291-0759-6
- The Tiger Roars (1967) ISBN 978-8-1716-7468-8
- Tales from the Indian Jungle (1970) ISBN 978-8-1716-7466-4
- Jungles Long Ago (1976, posthumously) ISBN 978-8-1716-7465-7

Many of these books are also available in the three volume Omnibus edition by Rupa Publications (ISBN 978-8-1716-7455-8, 978-8-1716-7456-5, 978-8-1291-3272-7).

Other publications

- The Fires of Passion (1969)
- Jungles Tales for Children (1971)
- Tales of Man Singh: King of Indian Dacoits (1961)
- The Bond Of Love (short story)

Translations

Anderson's books have been translated into many languages. Popular Kannada language writer Poornachandra Tejaswi has translated some of his hunting stories and published via Pustaka Prakashana in four volumes as Kadina Kategalu (ಕಾಡಿನ ಕತೆಗಳು). Sahyadri Books has published Anderson in Marathi language titled Narbhakshakachya Magavar (नरभक्षकाच्या मागावर), translated by Sanjay Bapat.

== See also ==
- E. R. C. Davidar, wildlife conservationist and Kenneth's friend
- K. Ullas Karanth, conservation zoologist and Kenneth's fan
- Jim Corbett and Pachabdi Gazi
- Hunter-naturalists of India
- List of famous big game hunters
- Project Tiger
