= Frederick Walter Champion =

British forester

Frederick Walter Champion (24 August 1893, Surrey – 21 April 1970, Scotland) was a British forester, worked in British India and East Africa and is considered the 'Father of Camera Trap Photography'. In the UK and India he became famous in the 1920s as one of the first wildlife photographers and conservationists.

== Early life ==
Champion grew up in a family of nature lovers. His father was the English entomologist George Charles Champion. His brother Sir Harry George Champion was also a forester, well known for classifying the forest types of India.

Champion travelled to India in 1913 and served in the Police Department in East Bengal until 1916. He was commissioned into the British Indian Army Reserve of Officers (Cavalry branch) as a second lieutenant on 21 August 1916, promoted temporarily to captain on 8 March 1917 and to lieutenant on 21 August 1917. He saw service with the 31st Lancers and then he was appointed wing officer with the Kurram Militia on 8 March 1917, a Frontier Corps unit based on the North West Frontier of India. He retired a lieutenant but was granted the rank of captain on 1 May 1922.

== Commitment to conservation ==
After returning from the war, he joined the Imperial Forestry Service in the United Provinces of India and became Deputy Conservator of Forests. Owing to his experiences during the war, he abhorred shooting and killing and blisteringly criticised sport hunting. He preferred shooting wildlife with a camera in the Sivalik Hills and pioneered camera trapping: in the 1920s he developed cameras triggered by tripwires. Using a flashlight as well, he obtained dozens of remarkable night-time photographs, which are among the first of wild tigers, leopards, sloth bears, dholes and other wildlife. He recognized that with good photographs of tigers, it was possible to tell individuals apart by their different stripe patterns.

Champion was a passionate conservationist, before conservation became fashionable, and campaigned hard for protection of tigers and their forest habitats. He strongly believed in the protectionist role of the forest department in India. He championed the idea of limiting gun licenses, stopping motor-cars from entering Reserved Forests and reducing rewards for killing wildlife. His commitment to conservation inspired his friend Jim Corbett, among other hunter-turned-conservationists. Together with Corbett, he was a founding member of India's first national park established in 1935, which was renamed to Corbett National Park in 1957.

When India became independent in 1947, Champion moved to East Africa, where he continued to work as Divisional Forest Officer for Kilimanjaro and the Serengeti until he retired.

== Publications ==
- With Camera in Tiger-land. Chatto & Windus, London 1927
- The Jungle in Sunlight and Shadow Chatto & Windus, London 1934. Reprinted 1996 by Natraj Publishers, Dehra Dun, India.
- "Preserving Wildlife in the United Provinces" No. 4, The United Provinces. Journal of the Bombay Natural History Society Vol. 37 (1934), pp. 104–110. Reprinted in: Thapar, V. (2001) Saving wild tigers, 1900-2000: the essential writings. Permanent Black, Delhi. pp. 57–68 (book preview)
- "From the Photographer's Point of View" In: Jepson, S. (ed.) (1936). Big game encounters: critical moments in the lives of well-known shikaris. H.F. & G. Witherby, London. pp. 30–36 (book preview)
- Correspondence: "The Protection of Wildlife". Indian Forester Vol. 55 (1939): 501–504.

== See also ==
- Kenneth Anderson, writer in South India
- Hunter-naturalists of India
- List of famous big game hunters
- Project Tiger
