= Tocher and Tocher Taxidermists =

Scottish-Indian taxidermy business

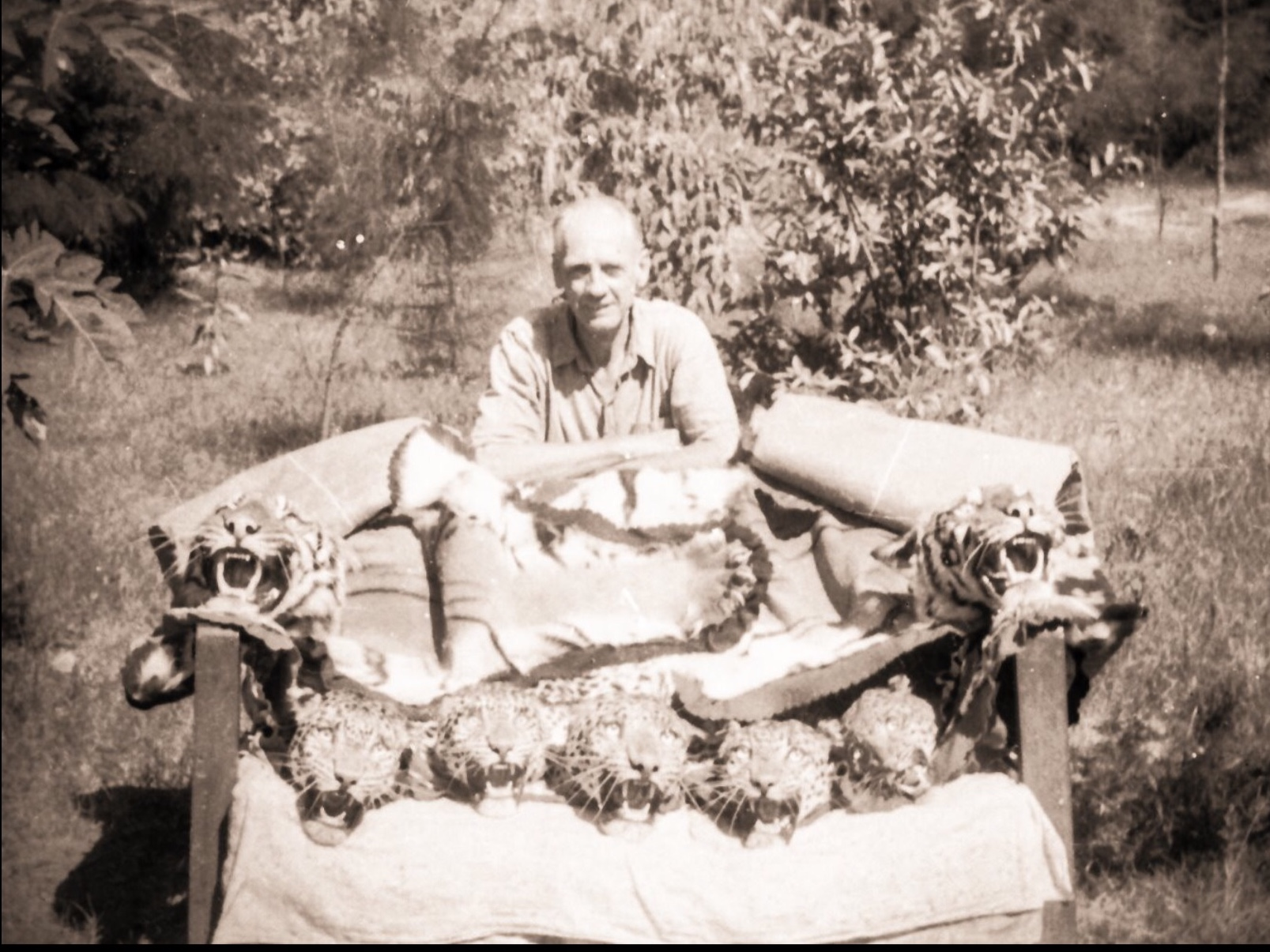
Herbert Tocher with trophies

Tocher and Tocher (1906 to c. 1968) were a firm of Anglo Indian taxidermists located in Bangalore, India. William Tocher was born in India in 1853 and was of Scottish ancestry. William’s father, James, had arrived in India with the East India Company. William became involved in taxidermy as a hobby; he later started his own taxidermy business in 1906.

William Tocher died in 1938 and the business then passed to his son Herbert Tocher (born 1899), who together with his son, George, continued the business at their home and studio named Panthera in Fraser Town, Bangalore.

== Work ==
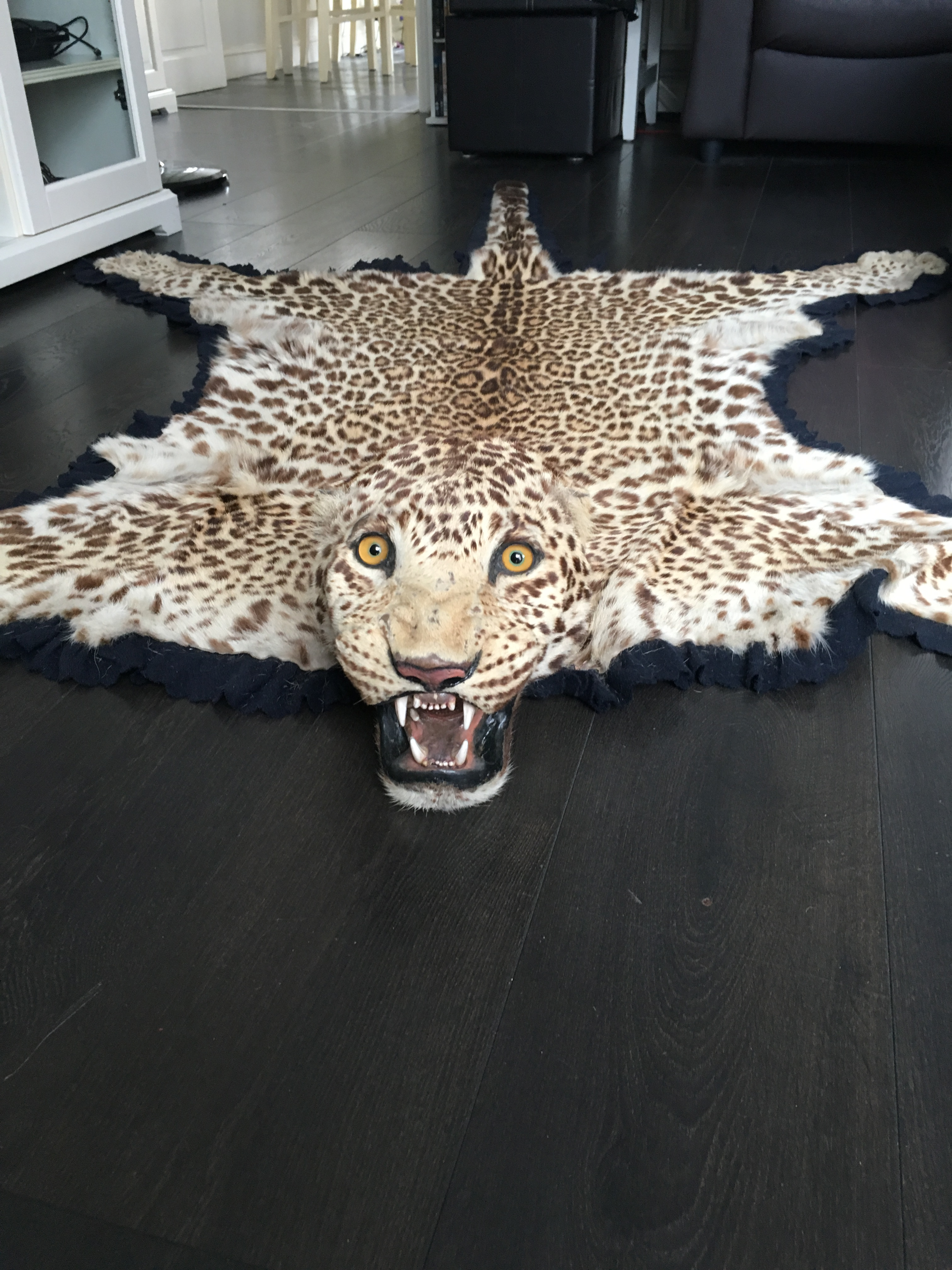
A Tocher and Tocher leopard skin rug with head mount from the 1920s, photographed in 2017.

Tocher and Tocher produced hunting trophies during an era when hunting was considered a gentlemen's sport and was very popular especially during the time of the British Raj in India. They worked on skins which were presented to them by the shikaris of dignitaries, senior military and film stars etc. Tocher and Tocher manufactured full mounts, half mounts, head and shoulder mounts, head only mounts and rugs. Their taxidermy mounts were made from the skins of tigers, leopards, bears, foxes, deer and other wild animals native to India.

They were a small family business and Herbert Tocher would personally hand paint the glass eyes for the specimens, as stated in their catalogues a tiger or leopard skin rug with head mount would take around two and half months to produce and a full tiger or leopard mount around six months.

The name Tocher and Tocher Taxidermists is perhaps not as familiar as larger taxidermy firms of the time such as the Van Ingens.

== Connections ==
In 2005 during a visit to the Van Ingen factory in Mysore by the taxidermy expert and writer Dr Pat A Morris, whilst carrying out research for a book on the Van Ingens Dr Morris came across two discarded Tocher and Tocher price lists and catalogues at the Van Ingen factory. According to the price lists, in 1923 Tocher and Tocher were the taxidermy specialists to the Vernay-Faunthorpe scientific expedition to India and South Asia. The expedition was to source tiger and leopard taxidermy specimens for mounting and display in the Hall of Asian Mammals at the American Museum of Natural History in New York City.

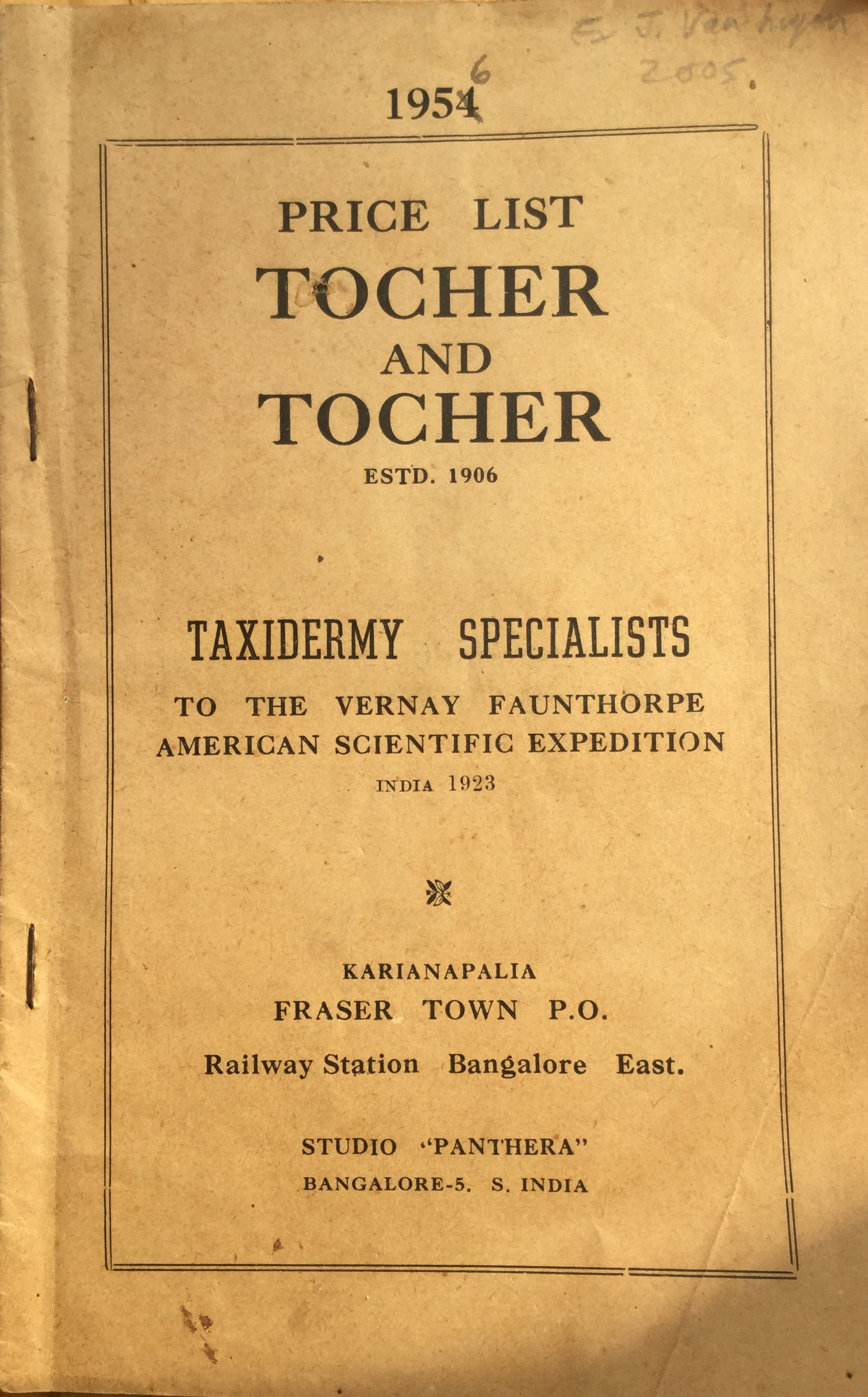
A Tocher and Tocher Price List

There are also references to Tocher and Tocher Taxidermy in a recent book named The Last White Hunter written by Joshua Mathew. The book chronicles the life of Donald Anderson who was once the movie stunt double for Stewart Granger in the 1958 film Harry Black and the Tiger. A stuntman and an accomplished hunter, Donald was the son of writer and big game hunter Kenneth Anderson. Donald mentions that Tocher and Tocher were the preferred taxidermists for all the big cats which both he and his father Kenneth hunted. Donald states that Herbert Tocher was friends with his father Kenneth and Herbert Tocher taught both the Andersons how to skin their animals and then prepare the skins for mounting.

== Legacy ==
During the 1960s the Indian government began to open secure national parks and reserves in an attempt to preserve the numbers of wild tigers and leopards which were by now decreasing, this resulted in less hunting and the closure of the Tocher and Tocher business. During the late 1960s the Tocher’s studio and house in Bangalore were sold and the family migrated to London United Kingdom. In 1972 the Indian government finally banned the hunting of wild animals.

Due to the modest quantities of taxidermy work produced by Tocher and Tocher, it is quite rare to find an example of their work today, however an item may appear for sale occasionally at an auction house or online. There could be a few examples of their work in some museums around the world.

The trophy wall at the Secunderabad Club in India has some examples of their work on display.
