= Wildlife tourism =

Travel for viewing wild animals in their natural habitats

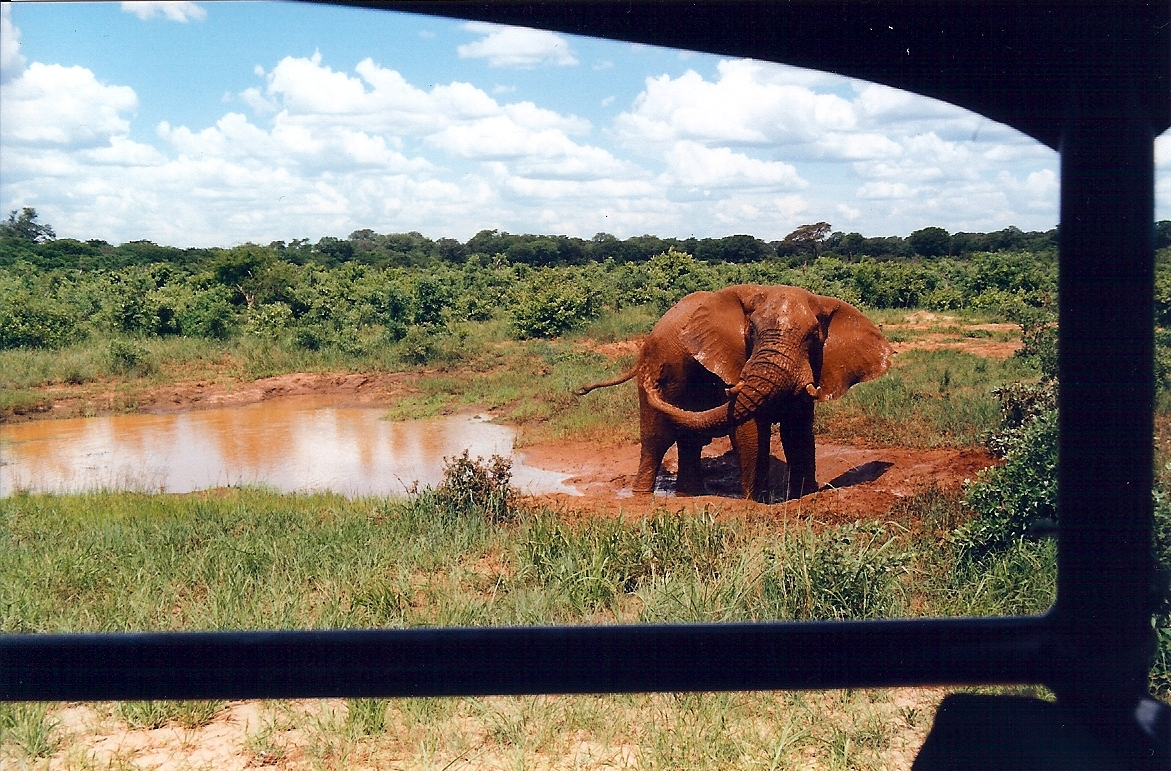
Animals can be viewed in their native or similar environments, from vehicles or on foot. This elephant in Hwange National Park, Zimbabwe, was quite undisturbed by the people and vehicle.

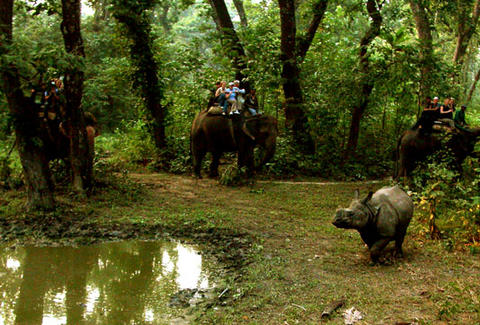
Elephant-mounted safari to view one-horned rhinoceros in Chitwan National Park, Nepal

Wildlife tourism is an element of many nations' travel industry centered around observation and interaction with local animal and plant life in their natural habitats. While it can include eco- and animal-friendly tourism, safari hunting and similar high-intervention activities also fall under the umbrella of wildlife tourism. Wildlife tourism, in its simplest sense, is interacting with wild animals in their natural habitat, either actively (e.g. hunting/collection) or passively (e.g. watching/photography). Wildlife tourism is an important part of the tourism industries in many countries including many African and South American countries, Australia, India, Canada, Indonesia, Bangladesh, Malaysia, Sri Lanka and Maldives among many. It has experienced a dramatic and rapid growth in recent years worldwide and many elements are closely aligned to eco-tourism and sustainable tourism.

According to United Nations World Tourism Organization, with an annual growth about 3%, 7% of world tourism industry relates to wildlife tourism. They also estimate that the growth is much more significant in places like UNESCO World Heritage Sites. Wildlife tourism currently employs 22 million people worldwide directly or indirectly, and contributes more than $120 billion to global GDP. As a multimillion-dollar international industry, wildlife tourism is often characterized by the offering of customized tour packages and safaris to allow close access to wildlife.

== Description ==
Wildlife tourism mostly encompasses non-consumptive interactions with wildlife, such as observing and photographing animals in their natural habitats. It also includes viewing of and interacting with captive animals in zoos or wildlife parks, and can also include animal-riding (e.g. elephant riding) and consumptive activities such as fishing and hunting, which will generally not come under the definition of ecotourism and may compromise animal welfare. It has the recreational aspects of adventure travel, and usually supports the values of ecotourism and nature conservation programs.

== Negative impacts ==
Wildlife tourism can cause significant disturbances to animals in their natural habitats. Even among the tourism practices which boast minimal-to-no direct contact with wildlife, the growing interest in traveling to developing countries has created a boom in resort and hotel construction, particularly on rain forest and mangrove forest lands. Wildlife viewing can scare away animals, disrupt their feeding and nesting sites, or acclimate them to the presence of people. In Kenya, for example, wildlife-observer disruption drives cheetahs off their reserves, increasing the risk of inbreeding and further endangering the species.

The practice of selling slots for tourists to participate in sanctioned hunts and culls, though seemingly innocent, can serve to impact populations negatively through indirect means. Though culls can and do serve a crucial role in the maintenance of several ecosystems' health, the lucrative nature of these operations lends itself to mimicry by unofficial groups and/or groups which are not fully aware of the potential negative impact of their actions. This is especially true of big-game and highly marketable species. Such unofficial organizations can promote the hunting or collecting of wildlife for profit without participating in or being sanctioned by wildlife management authorities while mimicking organized operations to fool unwary tourists. Though not sanctioned by any authority, the fact that these operations are funded by tourists and fueled by wildlife classifies such illicit hunting activity as "wildlife tourism".

=== Direct impacts ===
The impacts wildlife tourism will have on wildlife depends on the scale of tourist development and the behavior and resilience of wildlife to the presence of humans. When tourists activities occur during sensitive times of the life cycle (for example, during nesting season), and when they involve close approaches to wildlife for the purpose of identification or photography, the potential for disturbance is high. Not all species appear to be disturbed by tourists even within heavily visited areas.

=== Disturbing breeding patterns ===
The pressures of tourists searching out wildlife to photograph or hunt can adversely affect hunting and feeding patterns, and the breeding success of some species. Some may even have long-term implications for behavioral and ecological relationships. For example, an increase in boat traffic has disturbed the feeding of giant otters in Manú National Park, Peru. Further disturbance to wildlife occurs when tourist guides dig up turtle nests and chase swimming jaguars, tapirs, and otters to give clients better viewing opportunities. On the shores of Lake Kariba in Zimbabwe, the number of tourist boats and the noise generated has disrupted the feeding and drinking patterns of elephants and the black rhinoceros - it is feared that further increases in boat traffic will affect their reproductive success. The disturbance caused by human intervention may prevent species from their regular breeding and feeding activities.

To avoid this, tourism activities are often restricted in breeding time of some species. For instance, the tourism zone in the Eravikulam National Park, an important habitat of the Nilgiri tahrs in the Western Ghats, bars visitors from entering for two months during the breeding season.

=== Disturbing feeding patterns ===
Artificial feeding of wildlife by tourists can have severe consequences for social behavior patterns. Artificial feeding by tourists caused a breakdown of the territorial breeding system of land iguanas on the South Plaza in the Galápagos Islands. Territories were abandoned in favor of sites where food could be begged from tourists, and this has had a negative effect on the breeding success of iguanas. Artificial feeding can also result in a complete loss of normal feeding behaviors. In the Galápagos Islands, overfeeding by tourists was so extreme that, when stopped, some animals were unable to locate their natural food sources. Similarly, until the early 1970s, the diet of some grizzly bears in Yellowstone National Park consisted, to a large extent, of food wastes left by visitors at park refuse sites. When these sites were closed, the bears showed significant decreases in body size, reproductive rate, and litter size.

=== Disruption of parent-offspring bonds ===
Wildlife tourism also causes disruption to intra-specific relationships. Attendance by female harp seals to their pups declined when tourists were present and those females remaining with their pups spent significantly less time nursing and more time watching the tourists. There is also a risk of the young not being recognized, and being more exposed to predator attacks. A similar concern has been expressed over whale watching, whale calves normally maintain constant body contact with their mothers but, when separated, can transfer their attachment to the side of the boat.

=== Increased vulnerability to predators and competitors ===
The viewing of certain species by wildlife tourists makes the species more vulnerable to predators. Evidence of this phenomenon has been recorded in birds, reptiles and mammals. Problems have occurred in breeding colonies of pelicans .

=== Increased mortality, vanity hunts, and poaching ===
Vanity hunts (also called canned hunts) tend to breed their animals for specific desirable features without regard for the genetic health of the population. Breeding efforts can incorporate elements of inbreeding as specific features are aggressively sought. Inbreeding not only reinforces the presence of desirable features but brings with it the risk of inbreeding depression, which can reduce population fitness. Such operations also tend to feature other forms of animal abuse including inadequate housing and improper diet.

Poaching, similarly to vanity hunting, selects strongly for animal phenotypes deemed desirable by hunters. This "harvest selection" (sometimes termed "unnatural selection") for specific human-desired features depletes natural populations of alleles which confer those desirable phenotypes. Often, these features (large horns, large size, specific pelts) are not only desirable to humans, but play roles in survival within the animal's natural habitat and role within their ecosystem. By cutting down the number of animals bearing those desired phenotypes (and thus harboring the associated alleles), the amount of genetic material necessary for conferring those phenotypes upon later generations of the population is depleted (an example of genetic drift). This selection changes population structure over time, and can lead to a decrease in the wild-condition fitness of the population as it is forced to adapt around hunting-condition pressures.

=== Impacts on tourists' perceptions and behaviours towards wildlife ===
With the emergence of social media, many tourists have begun posting images online of themselves partaking in wildlife tourism experiences. These posts are not, in themselves, always negative, however they do often lead to increased visitation at wildlife tourism experiences, and can encourage behaviours that impact animal welfare. These behaviours, such as being too close to wildlife, can impact the behaviour, health, location and mating of some species.

In addition, photos posted from animal tourism experiences can send an unintentional message to viewers, particularly when a person is in the frame. For example, across a range of species, the presence of a human in a wildlife image can increase people's perceptions that the animal would make a good pet, or experiences negative welfare. In response to these impacts and animal welfare concerns, Instagram and other social media sites now display warnings when viewers search for terms such as "#wildlifeselfie".

More broadly, conservation researchers have argued that social-media visibility in wildlife tourism should not be evaluated only through platform metrics such as reach, likes or shares, but through its net effects on visitor behaviour, disturbance, welfare and conservation outcomes.

== Positive impacts ==
=== Habitat restoration by eco-lodges and other tourism operations ===
Many owners of eco-accommodation or wildlife attractions preserve and restore native habitats on their properties. In a large way, the tourists and travelers visiting the wildlife destinations contribute to the conservation and improvement of the conditions for the animals. The flow of people keeps poachers at bay from killing the valuable animals. The local tribes have a decent living as the tourism flourishes as it provides opportunities of improved livelihood.

=== Conservation breeding ===
Many wildlife parks (e.g. David Fleay Wildlife Park, Gold Coast, Australia) and zoos breed rare and endangered species as a part of their activities, and release the progeny when possible into suitable habitat.

=== Financial donations ===
Some wildlife tourism contributes monetary donations to conservation efforts e.g. Dreamworld, Gold Coast, has a display of Sumatran tigers, and money from visitor donations and from their 'tiger walk' goes to Sumatra to assist in-situ conservation of wild tigers.

=== Culls and population maintenance ===
In order to provide for less invasive wildlife tourism features and maintain ecosystem health, wild populations occasionally require maintenance measures. These measures can include the aforementioned conservation breeding programs to bolster population numbers, or culls to reduce population numbers. Population reduction via culls occurs not only through the obvious means of direct (fatal) removal of individuals, but by implementing an additional selective pressure upon the population. This "harvest selection" can alter allelic frequency (a measure of genetic diversity, and thus related to genetic health) within a population, allowing the hunters to shape future generations by hunting the current.

=== Conservation hunting/harvest ===
"Well monitored trophy hunting is inherently self-regulating, because modest off-take is required to ensure high trophy quality and thus marketability of the area and future seasons". For example in Zimbabwe trophy hunting was largely responsible for the conversion of 27,000 km2 of livestock ranches to game ranching and a subsequent quadrupling of wildlife populations. In South Africa there are approximately 5000 game ranches and 4000 mixed livestock/game ranches with a population of >1.7 million wild animals, presently 15-25% of ranches are used for wildlife production

=== Anti-poaching ===
Bringing tourists regularly into some areas may make it more difficult for poachers of large animals or those who collect smaller species for the black market. Some examples of tourism having a positive effect towards anti-poaching, are that of non-consumptive wildlife tourism services which in turn provide for economic benefit of rural communities, and also by providing these same local communities with game meat harvested through tourist activities such as hunting. Barrett and Arcese (1998) show that generating money sources from these non-consumptive practices of tourism generate a positive income effect and decrease game meat consumption while lowering illegal hunting (poaching)
