= E. Hanumantha Rao =

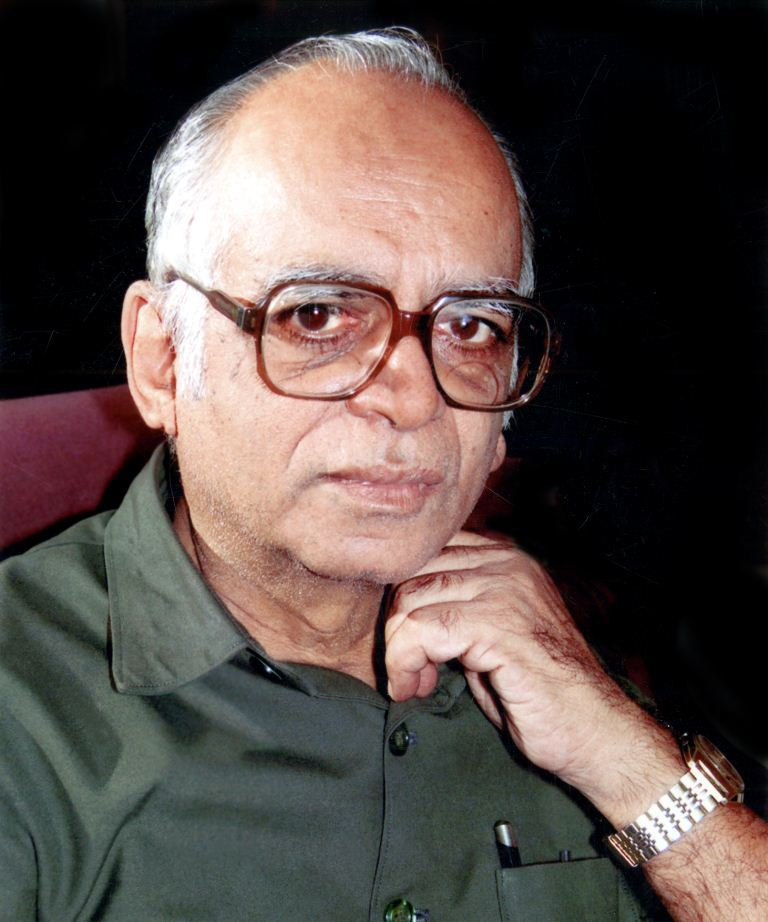

Eshwar Hanumantha Rao (1930 – 21 January 2004) was an Indian wildlife photographer. Hanumantha Rao became one of the most highly sought after Indian wildlife photographers in post independence India and his photographs found place widely in printed materials. He was a fellow of the Royal Photographic Society and a recipient of numerous awards.

Rao was born in family that was in the textile business. In 1947 he bought a camera in Paris where he attended a Scouts Jamboree. He then began to take photographs, specializing in wildlife. His photographs were widely sought by publishing companies around the world earning royalty for his works. He noted that he was the first Indian to pay income tax as a photographer. He received an AFIAP in 1960, a Karnataka Rajyotsava Award in 1986, the Kodak award for excellence in 1987 and the Karnataka Lalita Kala Academy Award for 1997–98. He was a Melvin Jones Fellow, and a member of wildlife committees.
