= E. H. N. Lowther =

British ornithologist (1890–1952)

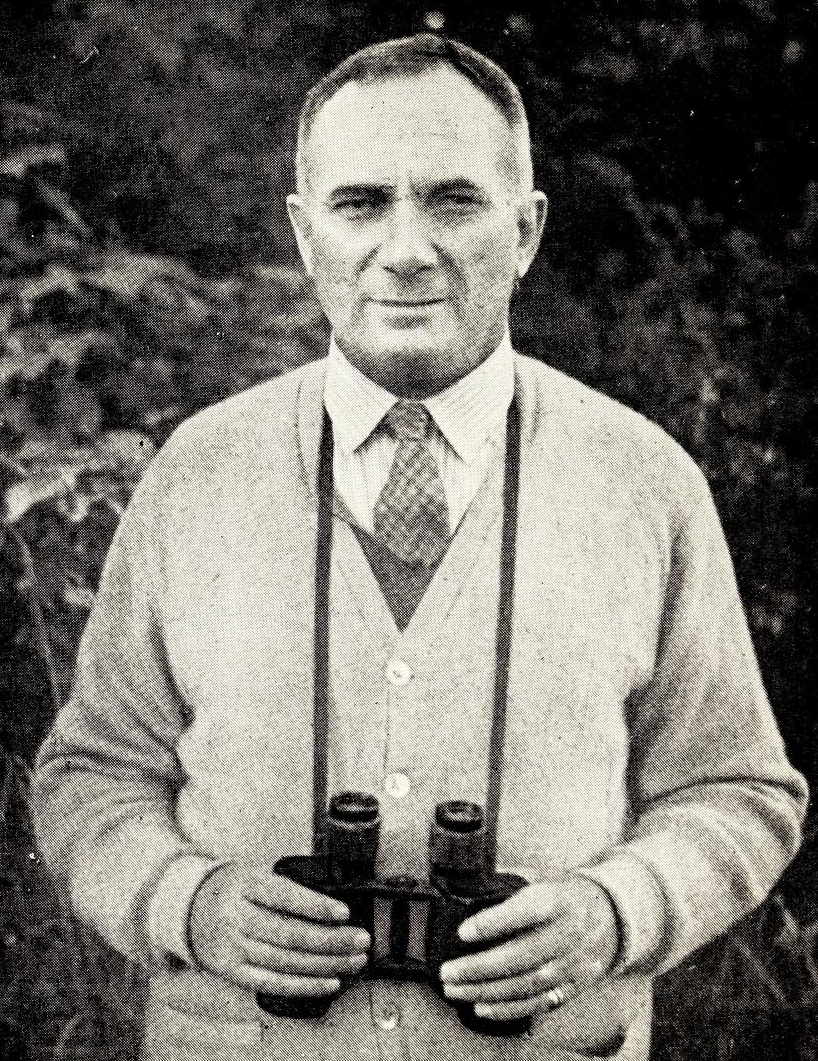
- Born: Ernest Herbert Newton Lowther; May 19, 1890; Lahore, Punjab, British India
- Died: April 28, 1952 (aged 61); Sussex, England
- Known for: Pioneering bird photography in India
- Spouse: Shuna Edith Mary Morgan (m. 1932)
- Scientific career
- Fields: Ornithology, Photography
- Workplaces: East India Railways
- Author abbrev. (botany): Lowther

Ernest Herbert Newton Lowther (19 May 1890 – 28 April 1952) was a British Indian railways engineer, an ornithologist, and a pioneer of bird photography in India. During his travels across India, he studied the life of birds and began to document their breeding behavior using nest photography. He co-wrote on the breeding birds of Kashmir and wrote on his own experiences as well as the history of bird photography in India.

== Life and Career ==
Lowther was born in Lahore to Annie née Moore and Arthur John Newton who worked in the railways. He was educated at Simla before going to Bedford and Tonbridge. He became interested in egg-collecting but shifted to bird photography after listening to a lecture by Richard Kearton at school in Tonbridge. He returned to India in 1911 and joined the East India Railways. He retired as a Divisional Superintendent of the Railways at Lucknow in 1945 and returned to England. Lowther married Shuna Edith Mary Morgan on 23 December 1932 at Bombay. He died at his home in Sussex.

== Ornithological Work ==
During his postings he examined the birds and began to photograph them at the nest mainly in the Bihar and United Provinces. He built high machans and hides for the purpose of photography and observation. He also made several trips to Kashmir. While in the Etawah district, he looked at the birds in relation to historic records made by Allan Octavian Hume. He published extensively in the Journal of the Bombay Natural History Society where he was a member. Among his observations at nest were those on helpers in the nest of babblers.

== Writings ==
Lowther published on the birds of Kashmir in collaboration with Colonel R.S.P. Bates. He also wrote a book titled A Bird photographer in India (1949).

- * (1936). "Notes on some Indian birds. I. The Indian Crested Swift". J. Bombay Nat. Hist. Soc. 39 (1): 116–124.
- * (1937). "Notes on some Indian birds. II. Nightjars". J. Bombay Nat. Hist. Soc. 39 (3): 543–551.
- * (1938). "Notes on some Indian birds. III. Birds in my garden". J. Bombay Nat. Hist. Soc. 40 (3): 409–424.
- * (1940). "Notes on some Indian birds. IV. The Manbhum District". J. Bombay Nat. Hist. Soc. 41 (3): 526–547.
- * (1940). "Notes on some Indian birds. Part V. The sportsman's gallery". J. Bombay Nat. Hist. Soc. 41 (4): 765–777.
- * (1941). "Notes on some Indian birds. Part VI. - An Indian river-bed". J. Bombay Nat. Hist. Soc. 42 (4): 782–795.
- * (1942). "Notes on some Indian birds. VII - Hornbills". J. Bombay Nat. Hist. Soc. 43 (3): 389–401.
- * (1944). "Notes on some Indian birds. VIII - By tank and jhil". J. Bombay Nat. Hist. Soc. 44 (3): 355–373.
- * (1944). "Notes on some Indian birds IX - Eagles, Owls and Vultures". J. Bombay Nat. Hist. Soc. 45 (1): 5–16.
- * (1946). "The Lammergeier (Gypaetus barbatus) Linnaeus". J. Bombay Nat. Hist. Soc. 46 (3): 501–508.
- Bates, R.S.P.; Lowther, E.H.N. (1952). "The history of bird-photography in India". J. Bombay Nat. Hist. Soc. 50 (4): 779–784.
