= Bowring Institute =

- Formation: 1868
- Founder: Benjamin Lewis Rice
- Type: Private Members Club
- Legal status: Active
- Headquarters: Bangalore, India
- Region served: Karnataka
- Staff: 200
- Website: www.bowringinstitute.in

Bowring Institute is a Private members' club in Bangalore, India. It was founded in 1868 by Benjamin Lewis Rice. It is named after Lewin Bentham Bowring. It is best known for its tennis facilities, but also has what is probably the largest library in Bangalore.

== History ==
The Bowring Institute completed 130 and 150 years in 2018 — 130 because the foundation stone of the current 12-acre property on St Mark’s Road was laid on 22 November 1888. However, the elite members-only club had an earlier avatar, which happened in 1868.

The institute was formed at a time when the industrial revolution was at its peak in Europe.

The club's main building has undergone a substantial renovation ending in 2025 and currently the surrounding facilities are also undergoing a major overhaul.

== Membership ==
The membership to the club is quite exclusive. As of 2014, the membership fee was 2 million Indian Rupees.
