= T.N.A. Perumal =

Indian wildlife photographer (1932–2017)

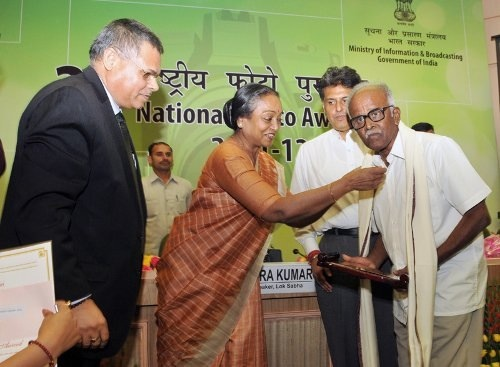
The Speaker, Lok Sabha, Smt. Meira Kumar presenting the 2nd National Photo Award 2011 for Life Time Achievement to Perumal at the 2nd National Photo Awards 2011-12 function, in New Delhi in 2013.

T.N.A. Perumal or Thanjavur Nateshachary Ayyamperumal (15 November 1932 – 8 February 2017) was a wildlife photographer from Bangalore, Karnataka, India.

He started taking photographs of flora and fauna in 1960 and was awarded with several awards for his photography. He has been a member of Mysore Photographic Society, Bangalore since 1961

== Life and work ==
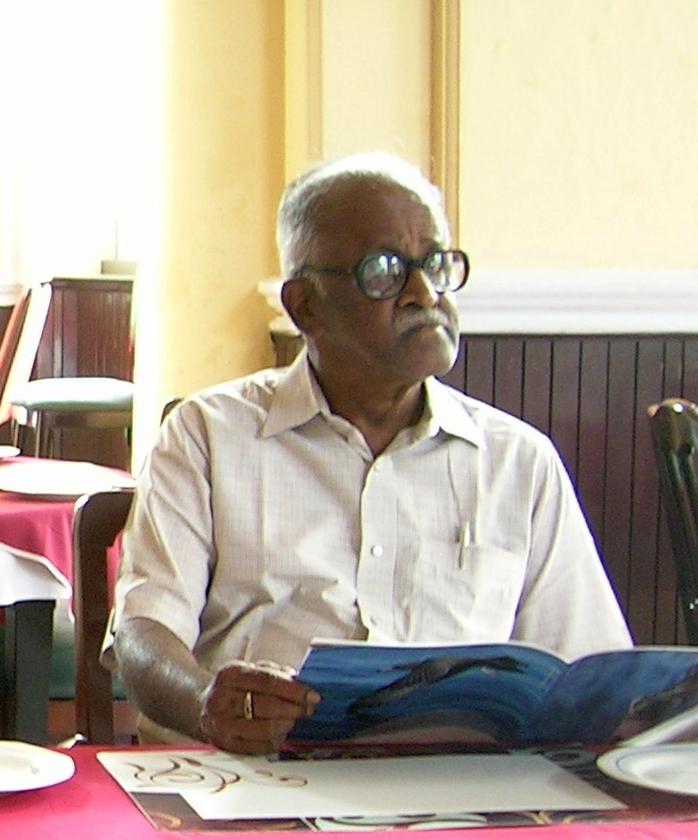
Perumal in 2011.

Perumal made black and white photographs during the 1960s and 1970s. He was a juror for several photographic contests. He has also given tips and guidance to youngsters who are interested in wildlife photography.

He settled in Bangalore and as of 2012, was working on a book, Reminiscences of a Wildlife Photographer.

Perumal died on February 8, 2017.

== Awards and recognition ==
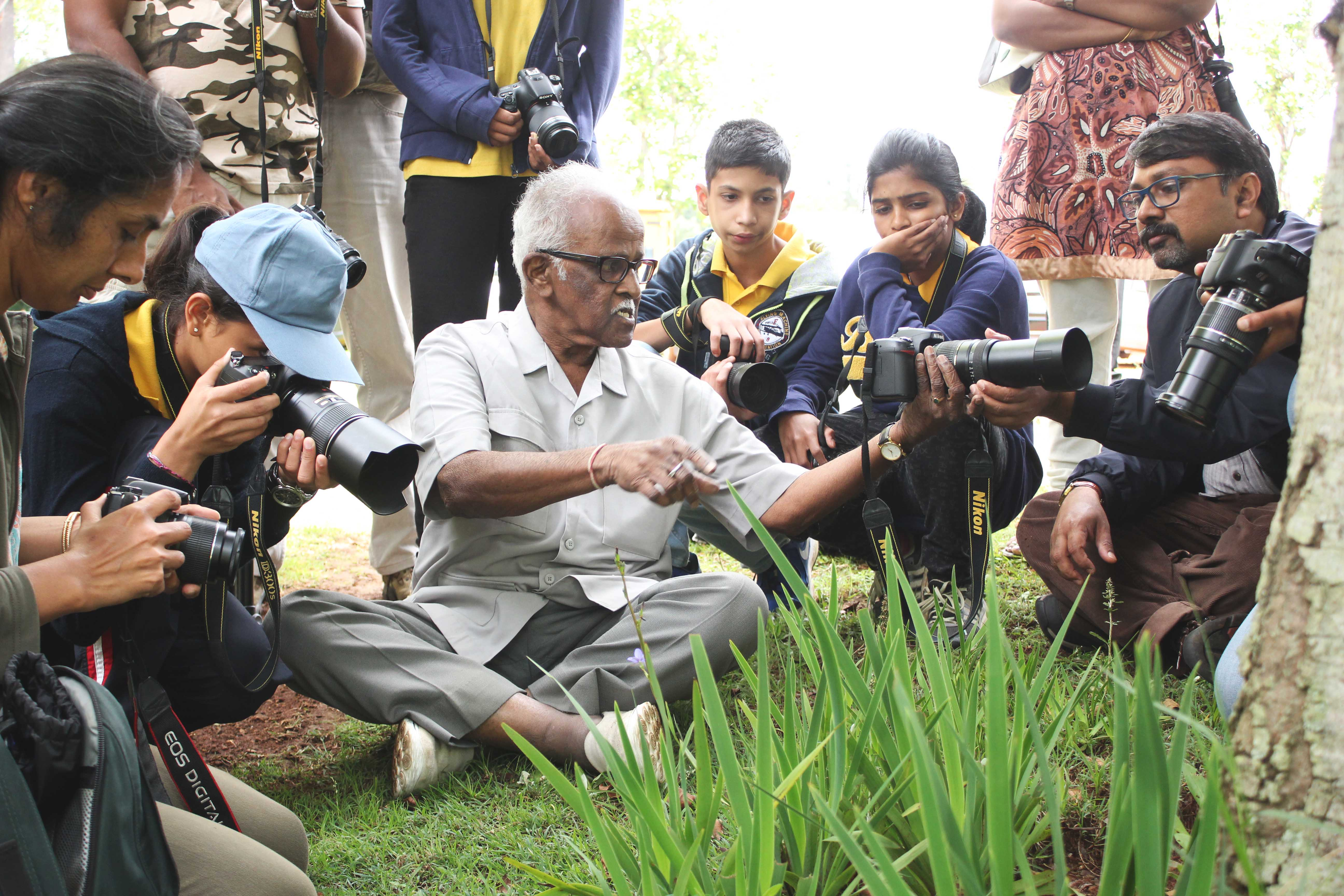
Perumal during a workshop, 2015.

- 1963 & 1968 Awarded by the Fédération Internationale de l'Art Photographique
- 1975: National Press Council Award for Industrial Photography
- 1977: Associateship of the Royal Photographic Society, UK (ARPS)
- 1978: Fellowship of Royal Photographic Society (FRPS), UK.
- 1983: Master Photographer of French Federation de l Art Photographique in Nature photograph
- 1993: Honorary Fellowship, India International Photographic Council, New Delhi
- 1995: Karnataka Lalit Kala Academy award for Nature photography
- 2008: Certificate of appreciation by Sanctuary Asia
- 2012: Lifetime Achievement award for wildlife photography, instituted by Government of India, Photo Division

== Publications ==
- Encounters in the forest – co-edited with M. N. Jayakumar
- Photographing wildlife in India – field guide for photographers.
- Some South Indian butterflies – with K.Gunathilagaraj
- A Concise Field Guide to Indian Insects and Arachnids – with Meenakshi Venkataram
- Reminiscences of a Wildlife Photographer – Some of his best photographs and Autobiography
- Eye in the Jungle – Photographs and Writings – M. Krishnan compiled by Ashish and Shanti Chandola with T.N.A. Perumal.
