= Chuka =

Chuka may refer to:

== Places ==
- Chuka, Kenya, a town
- Chuka, Tibet, a village
- Thak, a village in Kumaon division, Uttarakhand, India
  - Chuka man-eating tiger, a man-eating tiger that operated around the village in Kumaon

== People ==
- Chuka Umunna (born 1978), British Liberal Democrat politician and former Member of Parliament
- Chuka Odom (born 1960), Nigerian lawyer and politician
- Chuka Momah, Nigerian sport reporter and administrator
- Stefano Okaka Chuka (born 1989), Italian football player
- Derick 'Chuka' Ogbu (born 1990), Nigerian football player
- Rhema 'Chuka' Obed (born 1991), English-born football player

== Other ==
- Chuka (film), a 1967 western starring Rod Taylor
- Chuka (food), Japanese style Chinese food
- A local name for Rheum nobile, a wild food plant on the Tibetan Plateau
- Chuka dialect of the Meru language, a Bantu language of Kenya

== See also ==
- Chukka (disambiguation)
