= Chuka man-eater =

Bengal Man-eating tiger

- Species: Bengal tiger
- Sex: Male
- Born: unknown
- Died: 1937, April near village Thak

The Chuka man-eating tiger was a male Bengal tiger responsible for the death of three boys from Thak village in the Ladhya Valley in India in 1937. It was shot by Jim Corbett in April 1937 who noted that the animal had a broken canine tooth and several gunshot wounds in various parts of his body.

== First attacks ==
Before becoming a man-eater, the tiger used to frequent the firetrack running between the villages Chuka and Kot Kindri, frequently attacking travellers passing along the path. In the book Temple Tiger and more Man-Eaters of Kumaon, Corbett describes two such incidents which occurred in the winter of 1936–37. In the first incident, a villager was driving two bullocks along the path to Chuka when a tiger suddenly appeared in his path. The villager interposed between the tiger and his bullocks attempting to drive the tiger away. Taking advantage of the diversion created in their favour, the bullocks bolted away to the village. The tiger, however, attacked the man as he attempted to flee. As it sprang on him it gripped the plough and the provisions the man had been carrying across his shoulders. Relieved of his belongings the man sprinted towards the village. One of the tiger's claws had inflicted a deep wound on his right arm. Some weeks later two men from Tanakpur were using the same path while going to Kot Kindri. The tiger again appeared. However, the men continued to walk, shouting as they went. The tiger sprang on the first man who was carrying a bag of gur (unrefined sugar). The bag of gur caught in the tiger's mouth as it went down the hillside, leaving the man unharmed.

== Start of man-eating ==
On a day in early January 1937, seven men and two boys were herding cattle on the outskirts of Thak village. At 10 am the cattle began to stray towards the jungle and one of the boys was sent to herd the cattle back. The tiger was hiding in the jungle and killed a calf belonging to the herd. As he was about to carry it off the boy approached close to him and was promptly killed and half-eaten. Until midday, the tiger remained close to his kills when a kakar (muntjac) spotted him and raised an alarm. The men who were sleeping then were awakened by the alarm. Upon realizing that the cattle had strayed into the jungle, the second boy was sent to herd them back. The tiger promptly killed the second boy, which startled the cattle into chasing away the tiger and stampeding in the direction of the village. The tiger chased the stampeding cattle and killed one of them in full view of the men. The shouting of the men and the stampeding cattle attracted the attention of the villagers who came to the spot. The mother of the second boy found her son lying dead in the jungle. Close to his corpse the parents of the first boy found their half-eaten son and the dead calf. According to Corbett, the result of being disturbed on his first kill had turned the tiger from a cattle lifter to a man-eater.

== First hunt for the man-eater ==
Following these first killings, many sportsmen and district officials sat over baits all night on machans (tree platforms). Unfortunately the man-eater was only wounded twice with buckshot and not killed outright. Still he took another victim from Thak, this time another herdsman. On a wheat field two hundred yards above Thak, two orphaned brothers, aged 10 and 12, were grazing their cattle. Towards afternoon a cow strayed towards the jungle on the far side of the field. The boys attempted to drive it back and in doing so passed a bush where the tiger was lying in wait. Instead of choosing the cow, the tiger sprang on the older boy, killed him and disappeared with him into the jungle. The younger boy ran towards the village and a search party was organized. The tracks of the man-eater led into the Suwar Gadh ravine. Since the night was closing in, the search continued the following morning and the villagers found the boy's red cap and a few bits of torn and blood stained clothing. This was the Chuka man-eater's last human victim.

== Second hunt for the man-eater ==
In April 1937, Corbett set out to hunt the man-eater along with Ibbotson, the deputy commissioner of Kumaon. Six young male buffaloes procured from Tanakpur were tied out at various points near Thak village as bait for the man-eater for three nights before their arrival. Over the next four days Corbett and Ibbotson sat up over the baits but were unsuccessful. On the fifth day the buffalo tied at the edge of the jungle where the first two-human kills were made was carried off by the tiger. Avoiding two machans from where it had been shot at previously, the tiger passed over a rocky field where the horns of the kill had got stuck between two boulders. Unable to free it the tiger ate a meal from the hindquarters and left it. Corbett found the man-eater's paw prints in a nearby wallow and concluded that it was a big male tiger. He also got word from the villagers that the man-eater had a broken canine tooth. On all kills made by the man-eater one of the teeth had failed to penetrate the skin. Corbett sat up over a large jamun tree near the kill that night but could not kill the tiger. He along with his men covered up the kill the following day to protect it from vultures. Ibbotson meanwhile sat up over a bullock killed at Chuka by a tiger but had no success.

== Third hunt for the man-eater ==
A few days later, a buffalo that had been tied up at the lower end of the Suwar Gadh ravine was carried away. As Corbett approached the ravine he heard the growl of the tiger. Leaving the ravine along with his men he entered open ground. One of his men spotted the tiger on the adjoining hill. Corbett fired at the tiger but the bullet missed, only clipping a few hairs from the ruff of the neck. Following the tiger he found the kill in a pool four feet deep, where it had been hidden to protect it from hornets and blowflies. Returning the next day he found the kill had been removed from the pool and had been fully consumed except for the head and the hooves. Returning to camp Corbett received news that a cow had been killed in a ravine on the far side of the Ladhya Valley. Corbett along with divisional officer MacDonald sat up over the kill. However instead of the man-eater a tigress with two young cubs appeared and led them towards the concealed kill. After the cubs had found the kill, she went asleep close to the tree where Corbett was concealed. After the cubs had finished feeding, she licked both of them clean and then the family left. This tigress was later to become known as the Thak man-eater and was shot by Corbett in November 1938.

== Final hunt for the man-eater ==
The kill at Thak was uncovered to let the vultures eat it and another buffalo was tied up at the edge of the jungle. This buffalo was killed and carried away by the tiger into the Ladhya Valley. Corbett chose a fig tree close to the kill to wait for the man eater while Ibbotson decided to sit up over the first kill at Thak, which had not been consumed by the vultures. While sitting up over the kill, Corbett noticed the tiger coming towards it with the help of the alarms of monkeys. The man-eater eventually came to rest under the tree where Corbett was waiting for him. From the tree, Corbett could see his hind leg and tail. Corbett's first shot broke the man-eater's back and as he was sliding down, Corbett killed him by firing a second bullet through his chest.

== Post-mortem ==
Corbett found the man-eater had a broken canine tooth in his lower jaw and several gunshot wounds over his body. He concluded that these injuries together with the accidental encounter with the first two boys had turned him into a man-eater.

== In popular culture ==
The video game Guild Wars 2 features a tiger-themed legendary weapon and accompanying quest series named "Chuka and Champawat".

== See also ==
- Man-Eaters of Kumaon
- Corbett National Park
