= St. John in the Wilderness Church =

St. John in the Wilderness Church could refer to:

- St. John's in the Wilderness Episcopal Church (USA)
- St. John in the Wilderness Church (Dharamshala) (India)
- St. John in the Wilderness (Flat Rock, North Carolina) (USA)
- St. John in the Wilderness (Nainital) (India)
