= Bachelor of Powalgarh =

Unusually large Bengal tiger shot by Jim Corbett in 1930

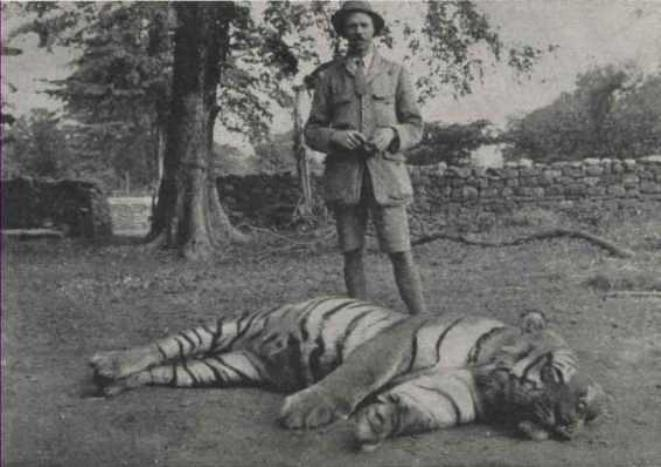
- Other name: King of Powalgarh
- Species: Bengal tiger
- Sex: Male
- Born: Prior to or during 1920
- Died: Winter of 1930 (aged at least 9–10); Powalgarh, Kumaon, India
- Cause of death: shot by Jim Corbett

The Bachelor of Powalgarh (fl. 1920–1930) also known as the King of Powalgarh, was an unusually large male Bengal tiger, said to have been 3.23 m (10 ft 7 in) long. From 1920 to 1930, the Bachelor was the most sought-after big-game trophy in the United Provinces. The British hunter Jim Corbett shot and killed the Bachelor in the winter of 1930, and later told the story in his 1944 book Man-Eaters of Kumaon.

== Size and previous hunter attempts ==
Jim Corbett first sighted the Bachelor in 1923 in a steep ravine within a secure retreat. Government rules prohibited night-time shooting, which inadvertently helped the highly sought after tiger to survive.

Information about the male Bengal tiger comes from a documentary-style story written by hunter, conservationist, and author Jim Corbett in his book Man-Eaters of Kumaon, published by the Oxford University Press in India in 1944.

== See also ==
- Champawat Tiger
- Prishibinsk tiger
- Corbett National Park
- Jim Corbett
- Man-eating tigers
- Man-Eaters of Kumaon
- Tiger attack
