= Gaver Tigers =

Man-eating tigers in Nepal

Gaver Tigers were man-eating tigers identified in Bardiya National Park of Nepal. By April 2021, the tigers killed ten people and injured several others. Three of the tigers were captured and transferred to rescue centers. One of the tigers escaped from its cage and is yet to be captured.

== Incidents ==
- The tigers killed a man in 2021. The remains of his body were found in the jungle the next day. Following the incident, the army stopped small vehicles passing through the forest.
- The tigers killed a 34 year old elephant mahout who was taking part in rhino survey in 2021.
- A ten-year-old boy was killed by the tiger.

== Capture ==
Because of possibility of free movement to Katarniaghat Wildlife Sanctuary in India, the Nepalese officials could not trace the tigers smoothly. Later, in April 2021, four tigers were identified as the attackers and taken under control. They were captured from Gaidamachan on 4 April, from Khata on 18 March and from Geruwa on 17 March. The tigers were found with broken canine teeth, possibly due to fighting between two males.

After the capture, one of the tigers escaped from the iron cage and returned to the forest in Banke district.

Two are being housed at the rescue facility in Bardia National Park in Thakurdwara and Rambapur. One has been transferred to the Central Zoo in Jawalakhel, Kathmandu.

== See also ==
- Champawat Tiger, another man-eating tiger that killed 436 people in Nepal and India.
- Tiger attack
- Dhurbe, a male elephant that killed several people in Nepal and eloped with a female elephant.
