= Gurney House =

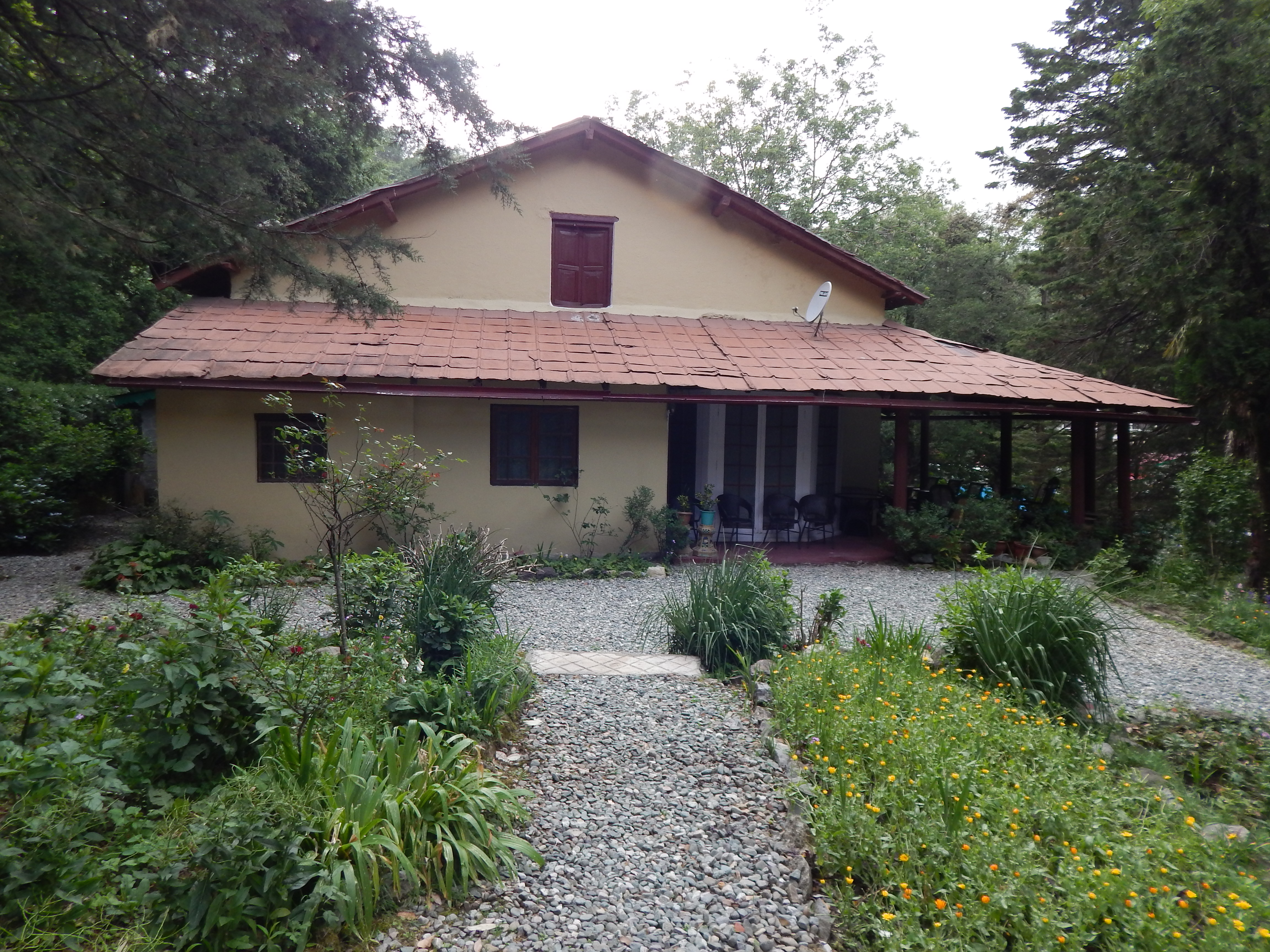
- Front view of Gurney House
- Interactive map of the Gurney House area

General information
- Type: House
- Architectural style: 19th century British cottage
- Location: Ayarpatta Hil, Nainital, Uttarakhand, India
- Coordinates: 29.388161°N 79.450590°E
- Completed: 1881

Gurney House is a historic building located in Nainital, Uttarakhand, India, and was the residence of hunter-conservationist and writer Jim Corbett until he left India in 1947. Currently it is a private residence.

== History ==
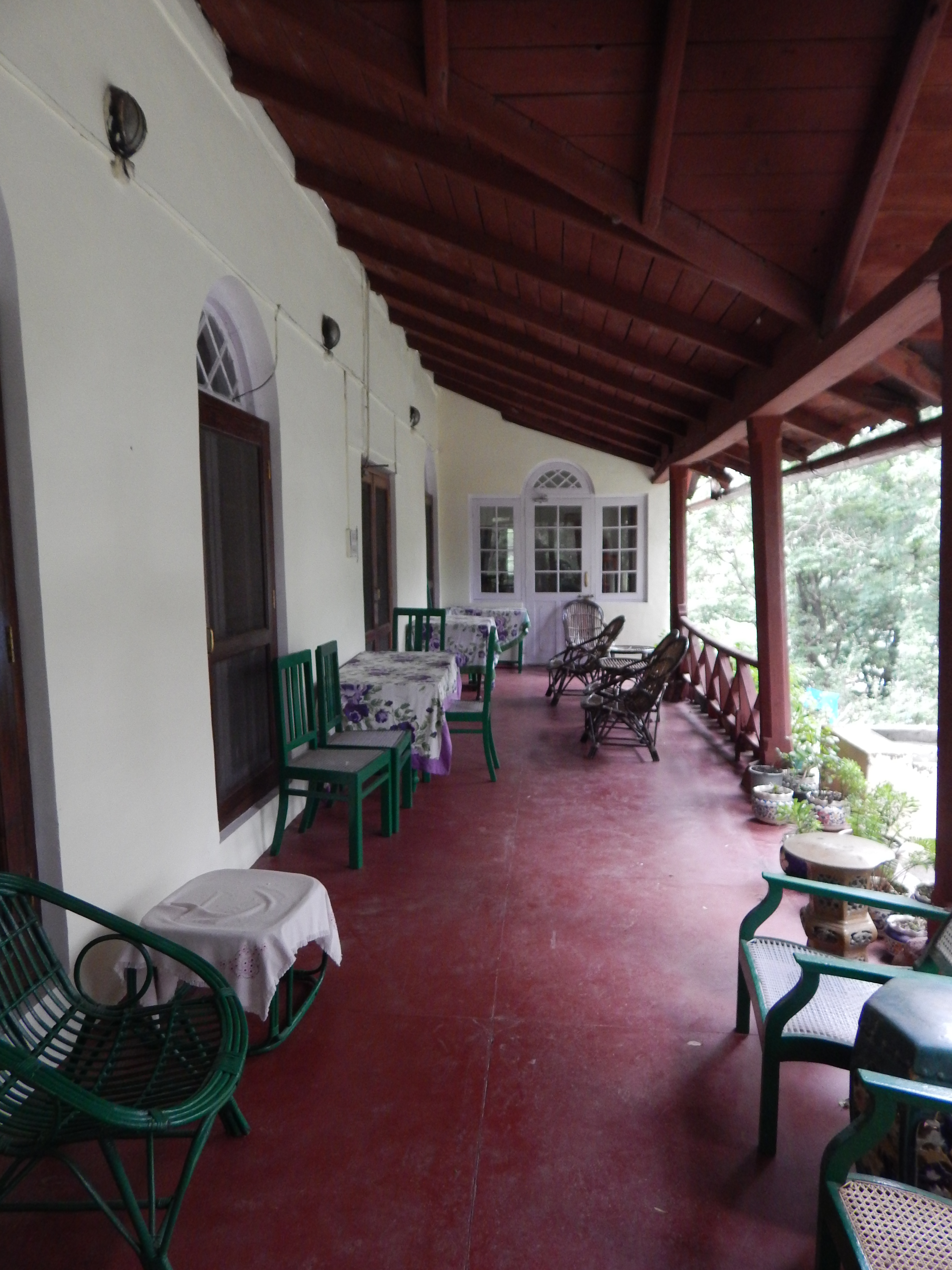
Verandah of Gurney House

It is located near Nainital Lake, on Ayarpatta Hill and was built in 1881. Mary Jane Corbett, mother Jim Corbet moved here in 1881 after the death of her husband, Christopher William Corbett who was postmaster of Nainital. The cottage was constructed in 1880 with the dismantled material of their earlier house on Alma Hill (which was on the hill on which a famous landslide occurred in 1880). And hence the name implies a house built of carted material from a dismantled house. Mary Jane lived here till she died on 16 May 1924. She was buried at the cemetery of the nearby St. John in the Wilderness, where her husband was previously buried.

The house stayed with the family till 1947, when Margaret Winifred Corbett, Jim Corbett's sister, sold the house to Sharda Prasad Varma, while they left for Kenya. Currently, the house is a private residence and serves as a private museum, with some Jim Corbett memorabilia.

== Architecture ==
Gurney House is a two‑storey Himalayan vernacular bungalow constructed of thick, locally quarried stone walls and timber-framed ceilings and floors that have endured for over a century. Its steep slate tiled roof features deep overhanging eaves designed to shed monsoon rains and provide year‑round shade. A wrap‑around verandah on both levels, supported by stout wooden posts, offers panoramic views of Naini Lake and maximizes natural cross‑ventilation. The interior centers on a double‑height central gallery flanked by drawing and dining rooms, all retaining original hardwood finishes and exposed ceiling beams. Decorative elements including carved timber balustrades, fretwork screens, and paneled shutters reflect the skilled craftsmanship of late‑19th‑century hill‑station artisans.
