= Man-Eater of Kumaon =

1948 American adventure film by Byron Haskin

- Directed by: Byron Haskin
- Screenplay by: Jeanne Bartlett; Lewis Meltzer (screenplay by); Richard G. Hubler; Alden Nash (adaptation by)
- Based on: the book Man-Eaters of Kumaon by Jim Corbett
- Produced by: Monty Shaff; Frank P. Rosenberg (in association with)
- Starring: Sabu; Wendell Corey; Joanne Page; Morris Carnovsky
- Cinematography: William C. Mellor, A.S.C.
- Edited by: George Arthur
- Music by: Hans J. Salter
- Production company: Shaff Productions
- Distributed by: A Universal – International release
- Release date: July 1, 1948
- Running time: 79 minutes
- Country: United States
- Language: English

Man-Eater of Kumaon is a 1948 American adventure film directed by Byron Haskin and starring Sabu, Wendell Corey and Joanne Page. The film was made after the success of the Jim Corbett book Man-Eaters of Kumaon, published by Oxford University Press in 1944.

The film was not based on any of the stories of the Corbett's bestselling book, but used a fictional plot. The credits also state that "the character of The Hunter is a fictional one, and is not meant in any way to portray the author on whose book this motion picture is based." The film was a box office flop, although some interesting footage of the tiger was filmed. Corbett is known to have said that "the best actor was the tiger".

== Plot ==
John Collins is visiting India. While he hunts a much feared man-eating tiger, he learns from native customs and understands the approach to life of native couple Narain and Lali.

== Cast ==
- Sabu as Narain
- Wendell Corey as The Hunter / John Collins
- Joanne Page as Lali
- Morris Carnovsky as Ganga Ram
- Argentina Brunetti as Sita
- James Moss as Panwah
- Ted Hecht as Native Doctor
- John Mansfield as Bearer
- Eddie Das as Ox-Cart Driver
- Charles Wagenheim as Panwah's Father
- Estelle Dodge as Panwah's mother
- Lal Chand Mehra as Farmer
- Phiroze Nazir as Farmer
- Virginia Wave as Farmer
- Frank Lackteen as Villager
- Jerry Riggio as Villager
- Neyle Morrow as Villager
- Ralph Moody as Villager
- Alan Foster as Villager
