= St. John in the Wilderness Church (Nainital) =

Anglican church in Nainital, India

Coordinates: 23°23′39.804″N 79°26′48.692″E

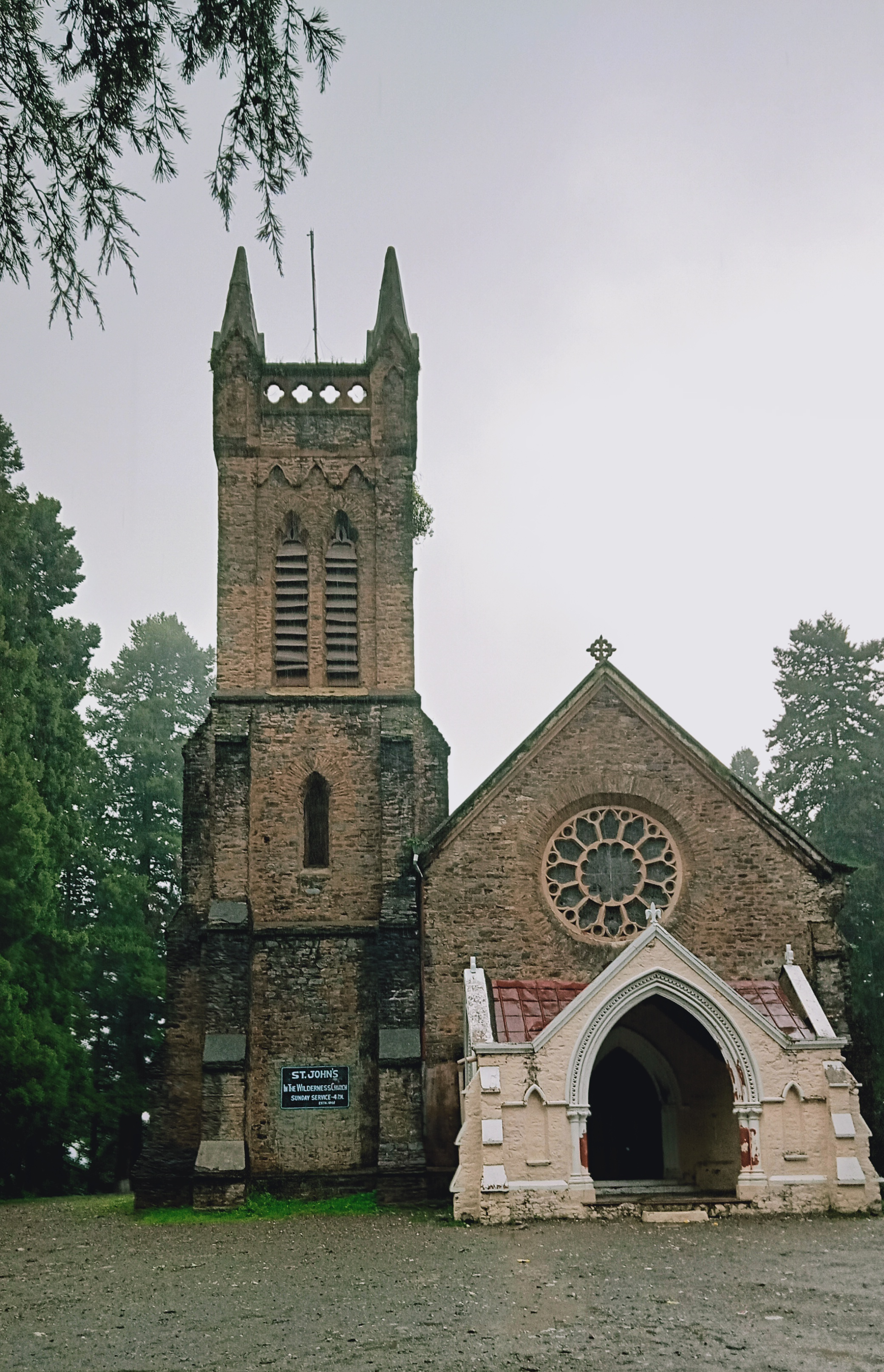
Church of St. John in the Wilderness

The Church of St. John in the Wilderness is an Anglican church built in the 1840s in Uttarakhand, India, and one of Nainital's oldest buildings.

== History ==
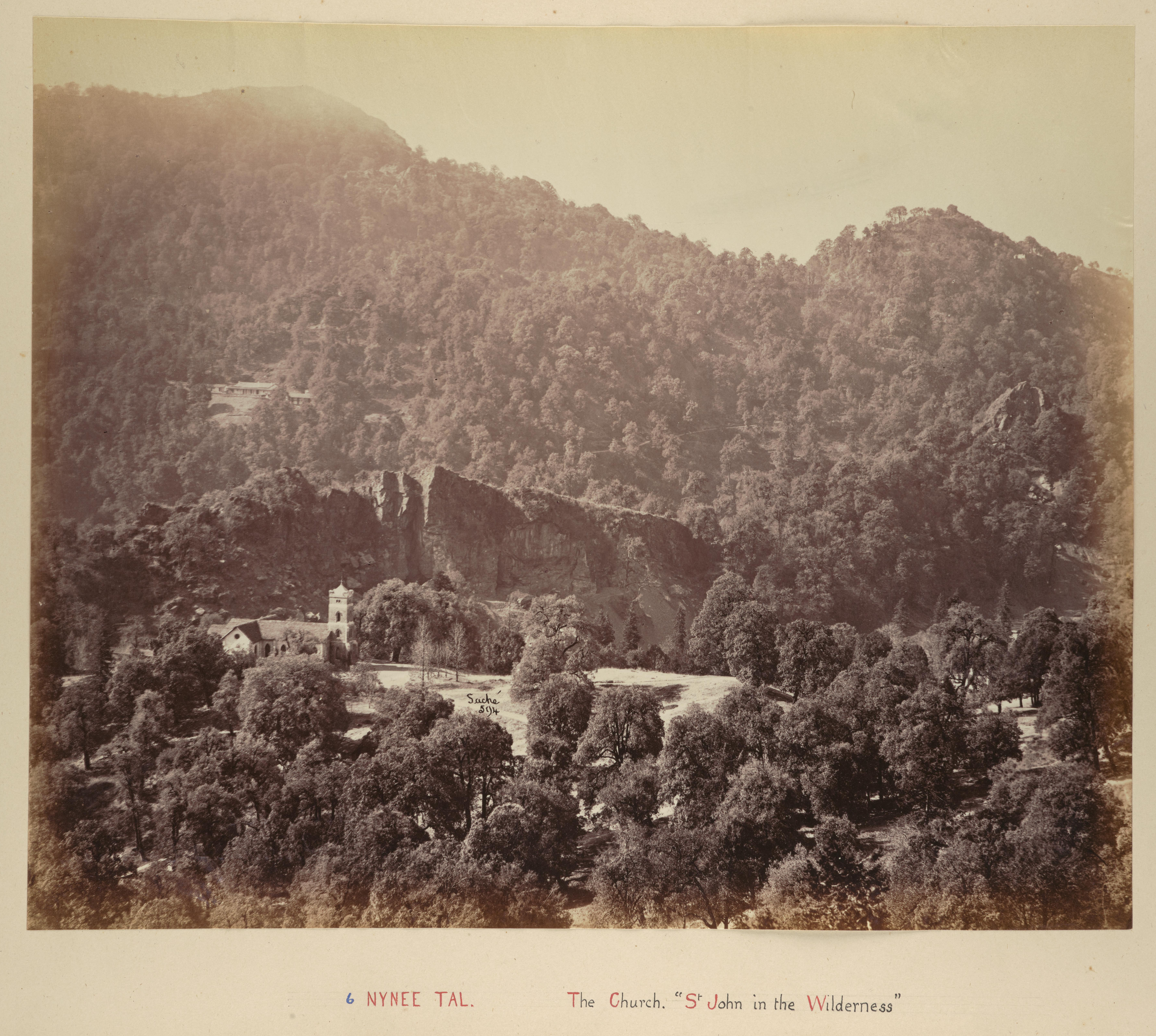
View around 1879

The site was chosen and approved in 1844 by Bishop Daniel Wilson. The cornerstone was laid in October 1846 and Captain Young, an executive engineer, made the plans at the cost of Rs 15,000 raised from private subscriptions and pew rents. Built in a Gothic style, it was inaugurated on 2 April 1848. A memorial in the church commemorates those killed in the 1880 Nainital landslide.

The church's burial ground contains graves from 1845 to around 1922 with the last burial being of Sir George Knox. The graves include those of the mother and father of Jim Corbett, Christopher William Corbett and Mary Jane Corbett who lived in nearby Gurney House.
