= Man-Eaters of Kumaon =

1944 book by Jim Corbett

- First edition
- Author: Jim Corbett
- Language: English
- Genre: Non-fiction
- Publisher: Oxford University Press
- Publication date: 1944
- Publication place: India

Man-Eaters of Kumaon is a 1944 book written by hunter-naturalist Jim Corbett. It details the experiences that Corbett had in the Kumaon region of India from the 1900s to the 1930s, while hunting man-eating Bengal tigers and Indian leopards. One tiger, for example, was responsible for over 400 human deaths. Man-Eaters of Kumaon is the best known of Corbett's books, and contains 10 stories of tracking and shooting man-eaters in the Indian Himalayas during the early years of the twentieth century. The text also contains incidental information on flora, fauna and village life. Seven of the stories were first published privately as Jungle Stories.

== Book contents ==
- Introduction by Sir Maurice Hallett
- Preface by Lord Linlithgow
- Authors Note: Causes of Man-eating in Tigers and Leopards
- Champawat Man-eater: The story of the first man-eating tiger shot by Corbett in 1907. Reportedly the man-eater claimed 436 human victims in Nepal and India
- Robin: Stories of Corbett's hunting companion Robin, his faithful spaniel.
- The Chowgarh tigers: The first of three man-eaters Corbett was to shoot on government request at a 1929 district conference. It turned out to be a pair of two tigers, a mother and its grown cub, which had together killed 64 people between 1925 and 1930. The cub was shot in April 1929 and the mother on 11 April 1930.
- The Bachelor of Powalgarh: The exciting tale of how Corbett shot the much sought after trophy tiger (non man-eater) in 1930.
- The Mohan Man-eater: The second of the three man-eaters Corbett was requested to shoot at the 1929 conference. Shot in May 1931.
- Fish of my Dreams: Corbett reflects on the joys of fishing for Mahseer (Indian river trout) in submontane rivers.
- The Kanda Man-eater: The third of the three man-eaters requested for dispatch at the 1929 conference. Shot in 1933.
- The Pipal Pani Tiger: Corbett traces 15 years of history of a local tiger (non man-eater), from its tracks in the mud as a cub, up until its death 15 years later
- The Thak Man-eater: The last man-eater Corbett shot in November 1938 (aged 63)
- Just Tigers: Corbett talks about the importance of conservation and his love of photographing tigers in the place of shooting them

== Origins ==
After much prompting by friends and family in 1935 Corbett finally put to paper seven accounts of his jungle encounters. These were then made into a small book and 100 copies were privately published under the title Jungle Stories and distributed amongst friends. The stories were titled, "Wild Life in the Village: An Appeal", "The Pipal Pani Tiger", "The Fish of My Dreams", "A Lost Paradise", "The Terror that Walks by Night", "Purnagiri and Its Mysterious Lights", and "The Chowgarh Tigers".

In 1943, whilst Corbett was recovering from typhus fever, his close friend and manager of India's branch of Oxford Press, R.E. Hawkins, convinced him to write a book for publishing. Using the 1935 Jungle Stories as a basis, Corbett wrote Man-Eaters of Kumaon (10 stories) which was first published by Oxford University Press in 1944.

== Notable editions ==
- 1944 – First publication in India by Oxford University Press – with 8 black and white photographs
- 1946 – Published in UK and USA by Oxford University Press – with 5 black and white photographs
- 1948 – Abridged Educational Edition published for schools under the title 'The Mohan Man-Eater and Other Stories' – illustrated by C.H.G. Moorhouse
- 1952 – Published in UK by Oxford University Press – illustrated by Raymond Sheppard (no photographs)
- 1953 – Published in USA by Pennant Paperbacks
- 1955 – Published in Paperback by Penguin
- 1962 – Published in Paperback by Bantam
- 1990–1995 Limited 1,500 Red Leather Bound set of Corbett's Complete works published by John Culler & Sons

== Legacy ==
=== Sales and success ===
Man-Eater of Kumaon, 2005 painting by Merab Abramishvili.

By May 1946 over half a million copies of Man-Eaters of Kumaon were in print. The book had been translated into four Western languages (including Spanish, Czech and Finnish) as well as six Indian languages. By 1980 the book went on to sell over four million copies worldwide.

=== Chhindwara court case ===
In Chhindwara, India 1949 Jim Corbett's Man-Eaters of Kumaon was read out in court by defense for a murder charge. A villager by the name of Todal was found dead in the forest on 19 September 1949. The police's theory was that the accused conspired to murder the victim as he was in love with his wife, the defense was that the victim was killed by a man-eating tiger. Thus the defense produced Corbett's book and read passages relating relevant wounds and circumstances of an attack. The accused was later found not guilty.

=== Film adaptations ===
In 1946 Universal Pictures brought the rights to the book and made the film Man-Eater of Kumaon (1948). The movie bore no relation to the book and centred on an American played by Wendell Corey who wounds a tiger and is later killed by it. Corbett saw the movie and claimed that the best actor was the tiger. In 1986, the BBC produced a docudrama titled Man-Eaters of India with Frederick Treves in the role of Jim Corbett. An IMAX movie, India: Kingdom of the Tiger, based on Corbett's books, was made in 2002. Corbett was played by Christopher Heyerdahl.

== See also ==
- Bengal tigers in literature
- Tiger attack
- Tiger attacks in the Sundarbans
