= George Edward Knox =

Sir George Edward Knox, CSI (14 November 1845 – 20 July 1922) was a British Indian judge who worked in the high court of Allahabad. He was known for his knowledge of Indian languages and his ability to work without the need for translators.

Knox was born in Madras where his father, George Francis, was a chaplain in the East India Company, and his wife Frances Mary Anne. Edmund Arbuthnott, his younger brother, later became bishop of Manchester. After studying in England at the Merchant Taylors' School from 1856 to 1862, he attended University College London for evening classes and won a prize in Sanskrit. He passed the Indian Civil Service exam in 1864 and moved to the Fort William College in Calcutta where he spent eighteen months studying Hindu, Urdu, and Sanskrit. He also knew enough Persian and Arabic to read Islamic law sources. He was posted to Meerut as an assistant collector and magistrate in 1867. In 1877, he was posted as a judge in the small causes court in Allahabad, and from 1890, a puisne judge in the high court. He acted as chief justice several times. He also served as a vice-chancellor of the Allahabad University. He worked as a judge throughout his life as there was no age of retirement for judges at the time. He published a two-volume Criminal Law of the Bengal Presidency (1873), A Digest of Civil Procedure (1877) and The Procedure of Mofussil Small Cause Courts (1878).

He was knighted in 1906, and made a Companion of the Order of the Star of India in 1917.

Knox married Katharine Anne Louise, daughter of Major William Loch of the Bombay Lancers and they had five sons and two daughters. Knox died at his home Braemar in Nainital and was buried in the cemetery of the St. John in the Wilderness Church.
