= Mokama Ghat =

- Village
- Mokama Ghat
- Location in Bihar, India Mokama Ghat (India)
- Coordinates: 25.3913°N 85.9197°E
- Country: India
- State: Bihar
- District: Patna
- Block: Mokama

Government
  - Type: Gram Panchayat
- Elevation: 42 m (138 ft)
- Demonym: Mokamaites

Languages
  - Official: Hindi, Magahi
- Time zone: UTC+5:30 (IST)
- PIN: 803302
- Telephone code: 06132
- ISO 3166 code: IN-BR
- Vehicle registration: BR-01
- Website: mokama.in
- Located on the southern bank of the Ganges River.

Mokama Ghat is a village about four kilometres east of Mokama on the bank of the river Ganga in Bihar, India.

== Importance ==
The Hindi word "Ghat" means "bank of a river which is used by people for bathing or transportation of passengers and goods". Mokama Ghat was used for ferrying cargo and passengers by ships across the river to the north eastern parts of India. It was linked by rail to Mokama, and was once an important railway station under the Danapur division of the East Central Railway Zone. It was also linked by road. The passengers and goods would be carried by either road or rail to Mokama Ghat, where they would be transported by ship across the river to Simaria Ghat.

== History ==
Until the first half of 20th century, Mokama Ghat was an important trade and transport link in eastern India. Malabika Chakrabarti mentions the congestion at Mokama railway Ghat in May 1897 as one of the reasons for the failure of the supply of grains during the Bengal famine of 1896–97 in her book on the said famine. After the construction of Rajendra Setu, which was both a road and rail bridge, that importance was lost.

Naturalist and writer Jim Corbett worked at Mokama Ghat railway station in the early part of 20th century. When he was eighteen he joined the railways at Mokama Ghat, working as fuel inspector and assistant station master. Later he became a labour contractor there. Jim Corbett established a school for the children of the staff of the Railways at Mokama Ghat with the help of an 'educationist' named Mr. Ram Saran.

Mokama Ghat was brought to the map of the struggle for Indian independence in 1908 when Prafulla Chaki was spotted at Mokama Ghat railway station while he was trying to escape after throwing a bomb at a carriage at Muzaffarpur on 30 April 1908 in which a European lady, Mrs. Kennedy and her daughter were killed. After a standoff with police, Chaki shot himself.

== Bibliography ==
- Shreedhar Narayan Pandey (1975). Education and social changes in Bihar, 1900-1921: a survey of social history of Bihar from Lord Curzon to noncooperation movement. Motilal Banarsidass. ISBN 978-0-8426-0986-9.
- Satish Chandra Singh (1973). Changes in the course of rivers & their effects on urban settlements in the Middle Ganga Plain. National Geographical Society of India.
- Shreeram Prasad Upadhyaya (1 January 1992). Indo-Nepal trade relations: a historical analysis of Nepal's trade with the British India. Nirala Publications. ISBN 9788185693200.
- Anandmurti (1996). Shabda cayanika, Volume 1. Ananda Marga Publications. ISBN 9788172520304.
