= Chuka Odom =

Nigerian lawyer and politician

Julius Chuka Odom
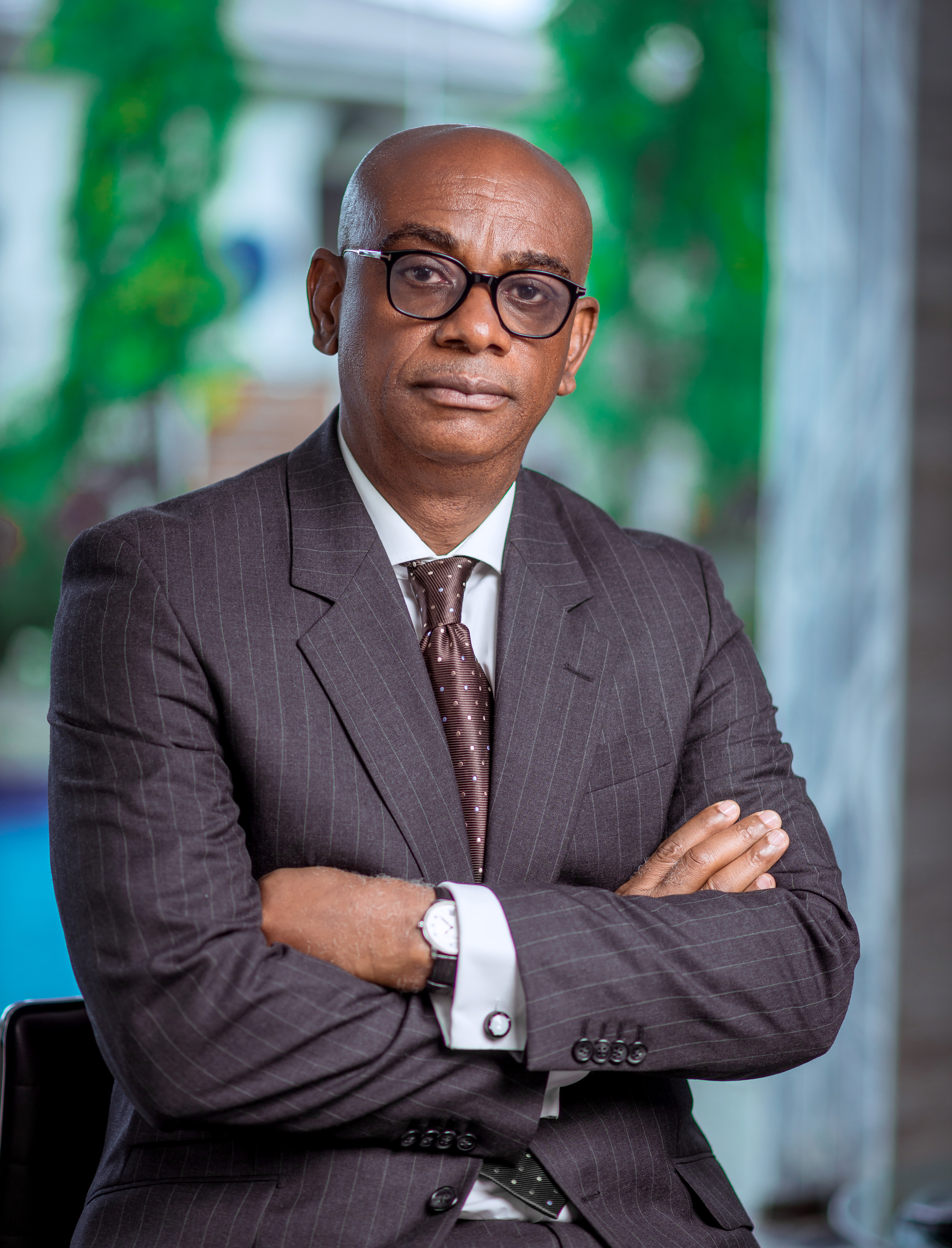
- Chuka Odom portrait

Special Adviser, Special Duties to the Governor of Abia State
- In office 1999–2001

Deputy Chief of Staff to the Abia State Governor
- In office 2001–2003

Commissioner for Special Duties, Abia State
- In office 2003–2007
- Preceded by: Elizabeth Uhuegbu

Minister of State, for Environment, Housing and Urban Development
- In office 2007–2009
- Preceded by: Rahman Mimiko
- Succeeded by: Grace Ekpiwhre

Minister of State, Federal Capital Territory
- In office 2009–2010
- Preceded by: Sen. John James Akpanudoedehe
- Succeeded by: Navy Capt. Omoniyi Caleb O.

Personal details
- Born: 19 October 1960 (age 65) Abia State, Nigeria
- Spouse: Lady Adaku Celine Odom
- Children: 8
- Education: St. Michael’s Primary School, Umuahia, Abia State. Immaculate Conception Seminary Ahia-Eke, Umuahia. Imo State University.
- Occupation: Politician; lawyer

Chuka Odom (born October 19, 1960) is a Nigerian lawyer and 2015 People's Democratic Party (PDP) aspirant for Governor of Imo State. He was Commissioner for Special Duties between 2003 - 2007, in Abia State, Federal Minister of State for Environment, Housing and Urban Development from December 2007 to May 2009 and then Minister of state for FCT (Federal Capital Territory, Abuja), a post he held until October 2010.

== Childhood and Education ==
Odom was born in Ikeduru in Imo state on 19 October 1960 to the family of Sir Tobias Odom and Lady Irene Odom (née Onyerindu). He started his educational journey at St. Michael's Primary School, Umuahia, Abia State between 1971 and 1974. He also attended Immaculate Conception Seminary Ahia-Eke, Umuahia in 1974 and obtained his A’Level Certificate in 1980. Thereafter, he proceeded to Imo State University to study law. He earned a Bachelor of Law (LLB Hons) in 1981 and attended Nigerian Law School, Lagos in 1986.

== Career and Politics ==
Odom started his career as Counsel-in-chamber at Tagbo Nwogu & Co Legal practitioners, Aba, Abia State between 1988 and 1990 and later Established Chuka Odom & Co, Legal Practitioners in 1990.

Odom ventured into politics in 1999 when he served as a campaign strategist for Orji Uzor Kalu's 1999 gubernatorial campaign and was appointed as Special Adviser, Special Duties to the former governor between 1999 and 2001. He later rose to become the Deputy Chief of Staff to the Governor, Commissioner for Special Duties, Abia State and between May 2007 to September 2007 he was made the Commissioner for Works, Housing and Urban Planning Imo State Government.

He became Honourable Minister of State for Environment, Housing and Urban Development of the Federal republic of Nigeria in 2007 - 2009 and later became the Minister of State, Federal Capital Territory between 2009 and 2010. He vied unsuccessfully for the House of Representatives seat for Ikeduru Federal Constituency, Imo State in 2011.

In the 2015 general election, he declared his interest to run for the Governor of Imo state with an inclusive government if elected but lost the party nomination ticket to Emeka Ihedioha who later lost out to Rochas Okorocha of the All Progressive Congress at the 2015 gubernatorial election. After the 2019 general election in Imo state with the emergence of Emeka Ihedioha as the state governor, he was announced as a member of the transition committee.

== Personal life ==
Odom married Lady Adaku Celine Odom, (née Nwakibu) the managing director of The Lifestyle Group in 1990 and together they have 8 children.
