= Jim Corbett =

Anglo-Indian hunter, naturalist and author (1875–1955)

Jim Corbett CIE OBE VD
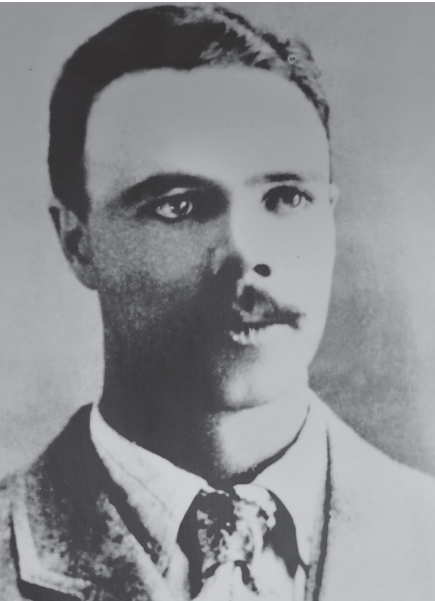
- Jim Corbett photographed around 1907, when he heard of the Champawat Tiger
- Born: Edward James Corbett; 25 July 1875; Nainital, North-Western Provinces, British India
- Died: 19 April 1955 (aged 79); Nyeri, British Kenya
- Resting place: Saint Peter's Anglican Church, Nyeri
- Occupations: Hunter; naturalist; writer

Edward James Corbett CIE OBE VD (25 July 1875 – 19 April 1955) was an Anglo-Indian hunter and author. He gained fame through hunting and killing several man-eating tigers and leopards in Northern India, as detailed in his bestselling 1944 memoir Man-Eaters of Kumaon. In his later years, he became an outspoken advocate of the nascent conservation movement.

Born in Nainital, Corbett explored and hunted in the jungles of India in childhood. He shot his first man-eater in 1907 and continued to hunt and kill such animals over the next four decades. Animals such as the Champawat Tiger, the Leopard of Rudraprayag, and the Panar Leopard had taken hundreds of victims in the divisions of Kumaon and Garhwal, before their deaths at Corbett's hands. Man-Eaters of Kumaon, which detailed several such hunts, became an international bestseller; it was followed by several other books and was adapted into a 1948 Hollywood film. Corbett increasingly disdained what he saw as the rapacious extermination of India's forests and wildlife, and fervently promoted wildlife photography as an alternative to trophy hunting. He played a major role in the creation of India's first wildlife reserve in 1934; it was renamed Jim Corbett National Park after his death. The Indochinese tiger subspecies received the scientific name Panthera tigris corbetti in his honour.

For many years, Corbett earned a living working for the railway companies, and for twenty-two years supervised the transport of goods across the Ganges at Mokameh Ghat. During the First World War, he recruited a labour corps and commanded them on the Western Front; he also supervised the logistics of the Third Anglo-Afghan War in 1919. Returning to his home town during the interwar period, he became a prominent local landowner and businessman who also organised hunts for the elite of British India, including the then-Governor-General Lord Linlithgow, who became a close friend. Corbett served as an instructor in jungle survival for troops of the Burma campaign during the Second World War. Dismayed by the febrile atmosphere surrounding the Indian independence movement, he emigrated to Kenya in 1947, and died in Nyeri eight years later.

== Ancestry and early life ==
The Corbetts descended from several families who had emigrated from the British Isles to the Indian subcontinent over the course of the 19th century. His paternal grandparents Joseph and Harriet Corbett, having eloped together from a monastery and a nunnery in Belfast, had arrived in India on 7 February 1815. They had nine children; the sixth, Christopher William, was born at Meerut in 1822, and followed his father into the Bengal Army, where he served as a medical officer. He married Mary Anne Morrow in December 1845, and they had three children before her early death. Surviving the Indian Mutiny of 1857, he retired from military service and married Mary Jane Doyle née Prussia, a 22-year-old widow of Anglo-Irish descent, in 1859. She had four children from her previous marriage to Charles James Doyle of Agra, who was killed in the mutiny.

In 1862, Christopher William was appointed the postmaster of Naini Tal, a thriving hill station in northern India which had been untouched by the Mutiny. There, he and Mary Jane had nine children, and additionally raised four children of a deceased sister. As Christopher William's salary was not large enough to support so many people, they supplemented their income through shrewd property investments, which Mary Jane was especially skilled at—she in effect became the first estate agent in Naini Tal, a valuable position in the rapidly-expanding town. Through his social connections and friendship with Henry Ramsay, the commissioner of the Kumaon division, Christopher William was additionally able to acquire a plot of land in the southern plains of Kumaon near Kaladhungi, on which he built a winter residence he named Arundel.

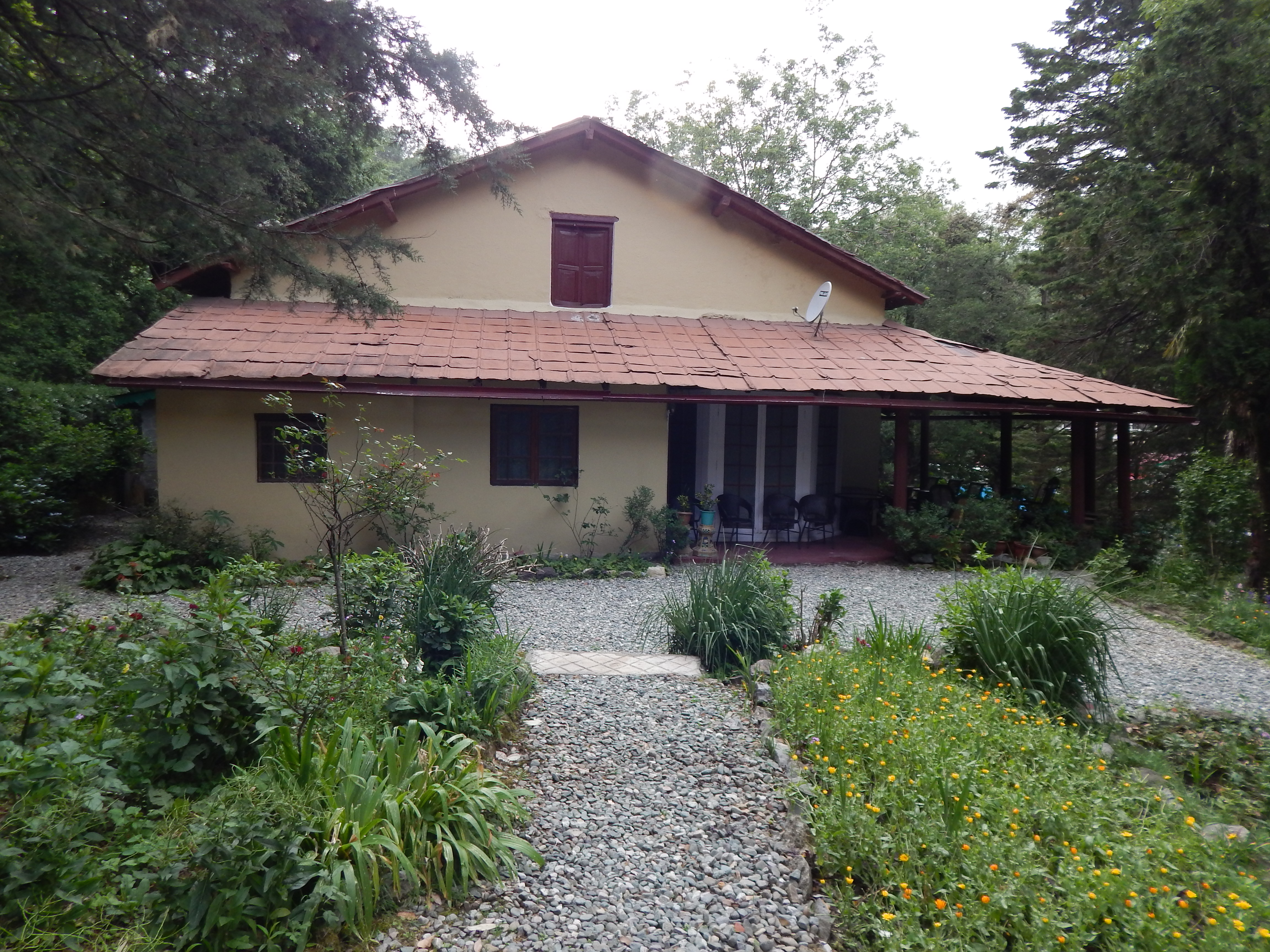
Gurney House

Edward James Corbett, the eighth and penultimate child of Christopher William and Mary Jane, was born on 25 July 1875 in Naini Tal. His early childhood years were privileged, and he was cared for by his mother, his elder sisters, and local servants; from the latter, he picked up the local languages, the basics of Hindu practices and philosophy, and some of their superstitions. However, the family soon suffered two misfortunes: first, a large landslide on 18 September 1880 which killed 151 people additionally ruined several of the Corbett's property investments; and second, Christopher William, who had retired from postmastership in 1878, died on 21 April 1881 after suffering heart problems. Mary Jane built a home on the opposite side of Naini Tal lake to the landslide; named Gurney House, it would be Jim Corbett's home for most of his life.

Corbett spent much of his childhood exploring the jungles around Gurney House; from these explorations, and from willing adults such as his eldest brother Tom and Kunwar Singh, the headman of the nearby village Chandni Chauk, he gained intimate knowledge of the habits of the local wildlife. He also began hunting, first with projectile weapons such as a catapult and a pellet bow, until being gifted an old muzzle-loading shotgun at the age of eight. With these weapons, he grew more skilled at hunting and tracking animals. After surviving a near-fatal bout of pneumonia at the age of six, he began his formal education in Naini Tal at Oak Openings School; there, training with the local cadet company, the ten-year-old Corbett's shooting impressed a group of dignitaries including the future Field Marshal Earl Roberts enough that he was granted a loan of a military-specification Martini-Henry rifle. Not long afterwards, he shot his first big cat—a leopard—with this rifle.

Although Corbett soon became proficient as a young hunter, as a student, first at Oak Openings and then at the Diocesian Boys' School, he was fairly average. He wanted to become an engineer, but that required further education and money which the family did not have, as Tom had now married and was supporting his own family. Jim also knew that it would be his responsibility to look after his mother and two sisters in later years. In turn they, especially his one-year older sister Maggie, were quite devoted to him. Leaving home at the age of seventeen, he took his first job as a temporary fuel inspector in Bihar, with a salary of one hundred rupees per month.

== Work career and First World War ==
Corbett spent the two years of his contract near Bakhtiarpur, in charge of a sizeable labour force which collected timber to be used as locomotive fuel. The gruelling work was slightly eased by the rapport he, unlike most of European descent, could build with his men. In cutting down up to two acres (8,100 m^{2}) of forest per day, he gained an appreciation for the then-unknown sciences of ecology and conservation. At the end of his contract, Corbett's honesty in not keeping excess profits for himself impressed a senior railway agent and earned him a job at the Samastipur office, where he worked for a year on various jobs. He was then appointed, in 1895, to the contract of transporting goods across the Ganges at Mokameh Ghat: by structuring his workforce efficiently and forming strong friendships with his subordinates, Corbett managed to clear the preexisting backlog, to the surprise of his superiors. He would remain in control of shipping goods at Mokhameh Ghat for the following twenty-two years.

His life at Mokameh Ghat was regular and peaceful. Living in a bungalow with three servants, only rarely seeing other Europeans, he began to become an active member of the local community, building a small school; the initial number of twenty students rapidly expanded to over three hundred, and the local government was compelled to take over the institution's running. Within a few years, Corbett was promoted to oversee the passenger steamers as well as the cargo shipping. This promotion gave him a large increase in salary, much of which he remitted to his family in Naini Tal, as well as access to the high-ranking travellers who often crossed the Ganges, such as Indian royalty and Chandra Shumsher Jung Bahadur Rana, the Prime Minister of Nepal. He also trained new arrivals from Britain whom the railways had recruited there.

At Mokameh Ghat, Corbett had come to view himself as more Indian than any other identity, but he retained his patriotism for Britain. He attempted to enlist when the Second Boer War broke out, but the railway authorities refused to release him from his contract, believing he was too valuable in his position at Mokameh Ghat. When the First World War broke out 1914, Corbett travelled to Calcutta to enlist but was rejected as too old at 39. However, as the war of attrition dragged on, the authorities began to recruit more heavily from India and he was commissioned as a captain in 1917, to the displeasure of his superiors. Ordered to raise a labour corps, he easily recruited five thousand men in Kumaon, where he was greatly esteemed because of his hunting of man-eaters; he took a tenth of these as a personal unit, named the 70th Kumaon Company. They set sail from Bombay in late summer 1917.

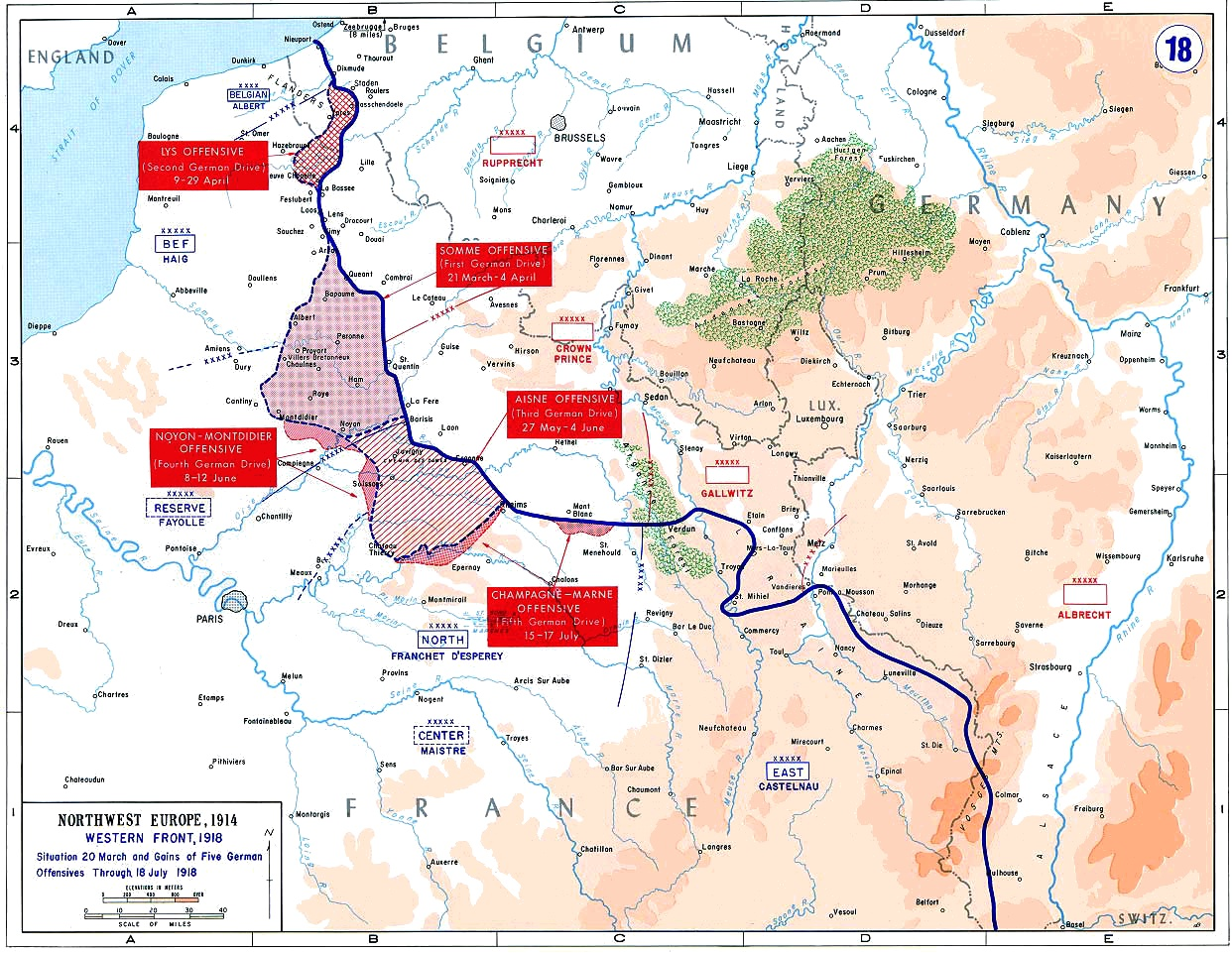
The Western Front in 1918; in January, Corbett was posted near Peronne (in the shaded area), which would be overrun in March by the German spring offensive.

Landing in Southampton, Corbett and his men were soon transferred to the Western Front, where they were posted to numerous positions including La Chapellette near Péronne. In the difficult conditions, Corbett sought to protect his men and keep their morale high. In addition to being in an unfamiliar land and climate, the Indian troops, often scorned by their British counterparts, faced difficulties like not being able to eat tinned beef stew or pork, both staples of British trench warfare. Corbett conducted himself well. After a visit to La Chapellette in January 1918, Lord Ampthill, who was in charge of the foreign labour corps, noted that Corbett struck him as "competent and resourceful", having introduced a novel way of heating the troop accommodation and having built, to Ampthill's astonishment, a "substantial brick building" containing a bathroom and drying room, both heated by an incinerator. At the conclusion of the war in 1918, only one of the five hundred men in the company had died. Corbett, now promoted to the rank of Major, explored London for a day before departing from Tilbury, visiting the pyramids of Giza on his way back home to India.

While negotiating with the railways on how he would rejoin their workforce, Corbett was unexpectedly called up again by the army for the Third Anglo-Afghan War in 1919. In late April or early May, he was sent to Peshawar, where he likely was in charge of the supply lines before the Battle of Thal, in which he may have seen action. He was subsequently involved in subduing tribes in Zhob district and Waziristan.

== Businessman and local notable ==
After the Third Anglo-Afghan War finished in 1919, Corbett declined to return to the railways, and worked on a Kumaon house agency he had invested in and whose owner had subsequently died. Corbett expanded this business, named F.E.G. Mathews & Co. after its late owner, into hardware and tradesmanship. Around 1915, he had purchased the near-derelict village of Chhoti Haldwani near Kaladhungi. Despite initial difficulties, the village came to prosper: Corbett imported new crops such as bananas, grapes, and maize, and maintained the village to a high standard. A 9-kilometre (5.6 mi) wall he built to protect the villagers remains standing.

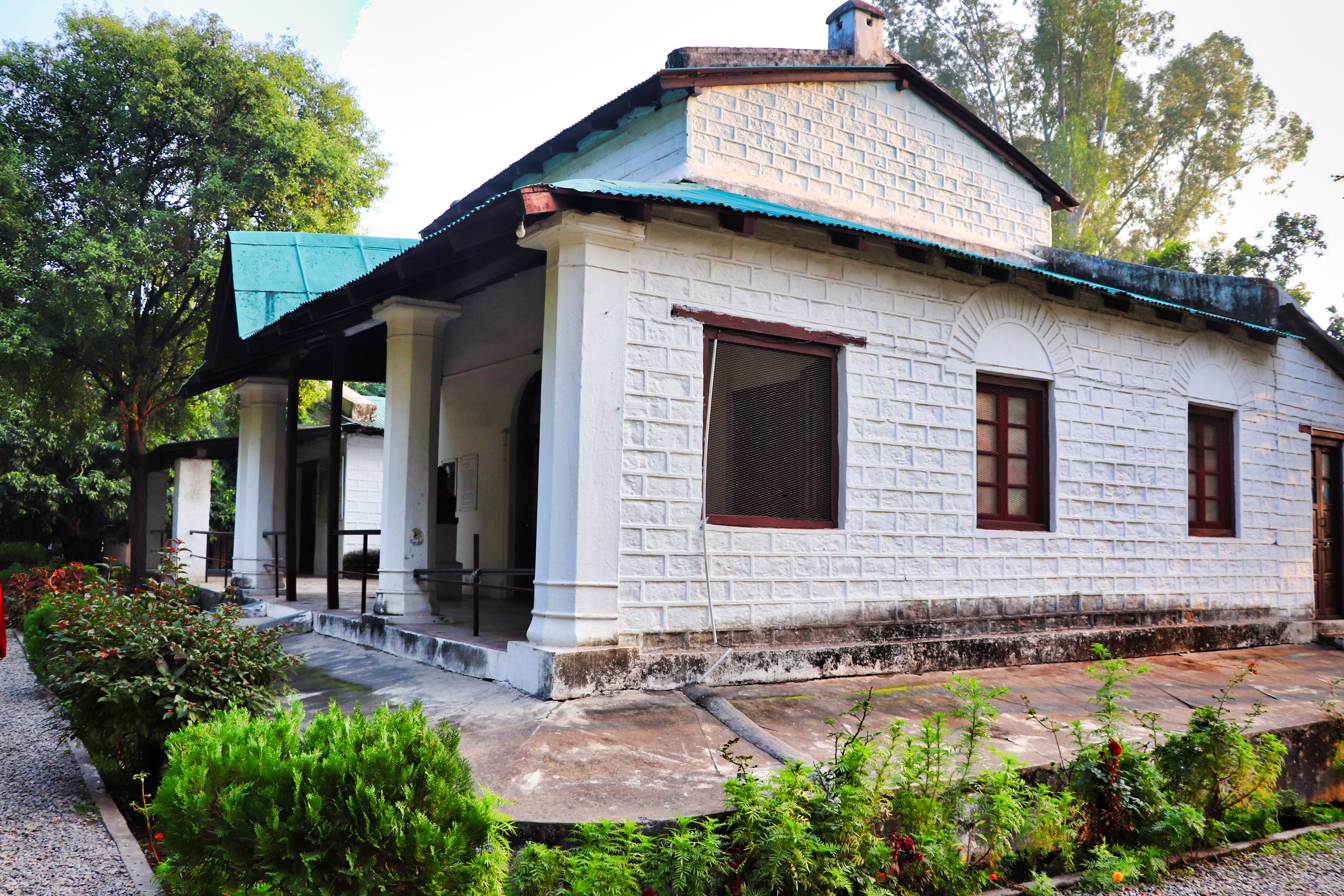
Corbett House, Kaladhungi

Corbett became close friends with Percy Wyndham, the Kumaon District Commissioner, and with him fought banditry in the jungles; they also invested together in East African coffee by jointly buying a farm near Majengo in then-Tanganyika. Wyndham retired there in 1924, and Corbett travelled to East Africa most years to inspect his investment and see his friend. He also built a house for himself and Maggie in Kaladhungi, although he normally eschewed what was nominally his bedroom and preferred to sleep in a tent in the garden; when the house was later converted into a museum in his honour, staff erected a bust of him on the normal site of his tent.

In 1920, Corbett retook the position of vice-chairman of the Naini Tal municipal board, which he had vacated a decade earlier due to his inactivity. As part of this committee for two decades, he enforced economic standards and improved civil engineering in the town. As chairman of the public works committee, he took a personal interest both in maintaining and renewing the town's attractiveness, and in environmental protection. He passed laws against excessive fishing and deforestation, and unsuccessfully campaigned for power lines to be placed underground.

As a more prominent figure in Naini Tal, Corbett began to be accepted into a wider social circle, to whom he had previously been an outcast. He was increasingly called upon to coordinate hunting events. Initially arranging simple partridge shoots, Corbett was soon organising tiger shoots for the elite of British India. This culminated in a close friendship with Lord Linlithgow, Governor-General of India between 1936 and 1943; Corbett organised hunts near Kaladhungi for Linlithgow and his family several times a year, and was often invited to stay in the Viceroy House in Delhi.

=== Second World War service ===
At the outbreak of the Second World War, Corbett, who had retained his rank of major in the reserve army, immediately volunteered again. Unsurprisingly, at well over sixty years old, he was rejected. After initially working for a charity which looked after the families of active servicemen, he became a recruitment officer in 1940 after lying about his own age. After two years in this role, he suffered from a serious typhus infection, probably exacerbated by a near-drowning experience he had had when a boat capsized on the Sharda River. During a three-month hospital stay, he lost almost half his weight and came close to being permanently unable to walk, but regular exercise prevented this possibility.

During Corbett's convalescence in 1942/43, Imperial Japan had commenced the Burma campaign in the jungles of Southeast Asia. When he next approached the army in late 1943, they saw his potential as a source of knowledge: by February 1944, he had been appointed senior instructor in junglecraft at Chhindwara and recommissioned as a lieutenant colonel. He inspected the Burmese forests in March 1944 and returned to India on his first flight, courtesy of American airmen he had befriended.

Corbett's training, for British and American troops destined for the Burmese jungles, encompassed a wide range of topics. Survival techniques he taught included obtaining fresh water, distinguishing poisonous snakes and edible plants, trapping small animals, creating natural herbal medicines for wounds, fevers, stomach problems, and communicating by blowing through reeds. His students were taught how to orient themselves, how to pinpoint sounds, and how to keep maximum visual awareness. He displayed how tracking skills allowed him to assess how many enemy soldiers passed on a track, how long ago, how fast they were travelling, and even whether their guns were loaded. One of the soldiers he trained later noted that "Corbett appeared to be a cross between a magician and a master detective".

== Relationship with wildlife ==
=== Hunting man-eaters ===
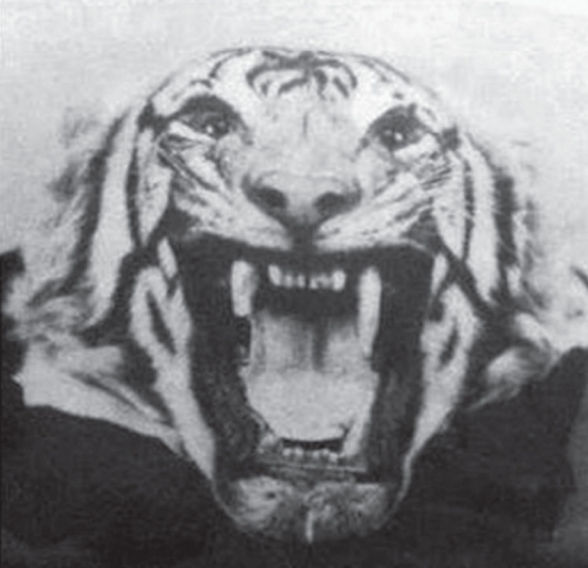
Head of the Champawat tigress. Because of her visibly broken upper and lower right canine teeth, she became unable to hunt her natural prey of wild animals.

In 1907, Corbett was approached by the deputy commissioner of Naini Tal, who asked him to hunt the Champawat Tiger. This tigress had allegedly killed two hundred people in Nepal, before a mass beating drove her into India. She established her territory around Lohaghat in early 1903 and doubled her total over the next four years, claiming a victim once every three weeks on average. None of the shikaris (hunters), sportsmen, or army infantry deputised to hunt her had come close. Corbett accepted the task, and hunted the tigress for a number of days. After a seventeen-year-old girl was killed, a beat involving 298 men was organised, which drove the tigress from cover and allowed Corbett to shoot her. As a reward, he was presented with a rifle by Sir John Hewett, Lieutenant Governor of the United Provinces. A twelve-guinea .275 Rigby with leaf sights and a French walnut stock, it became Corbett's favourite weapon, used in most subsequent man-eater hunts.

In the wake of this success, Corbett was asked to hunt two other man-eating animals: a tiger active around Mukteshwar, and the Panar Leopard in the villages in the east of the Almora district. The latter animal had killed over four hundred people. Corbett tackled them both in 1910, tracking and killing the tiger in the spring; he was forced to abort his initial attempt to kill the leopard in April because of his work at Mokameh Ghat, but returned in September and killed the animal in a nighttime hunt.

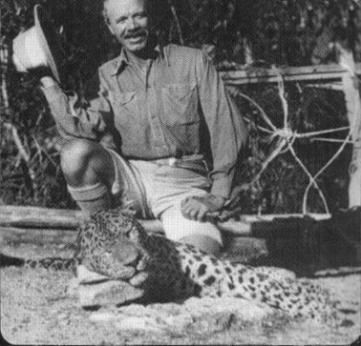
Corbett crouching over the Leopard of Rudraprayag

It was over fifteen years before Corbett hunted another man-eater. In 1925, he was asked by his friend Sir William Ibbotson to hunt the Leopard of Rudraprayag, which since 1918 had been terrorizing the populace of the neighbouring Garhwal division. Although it had only claimed 125 victims, much less than the Panar Leopard, it received far more attention, being mentioned in the newspapers on multiple continents across the Anglosphere, in addition to nearly every publication in India. This notoriety came about because the leopard's territory covered the pilgrimage trails to the Hindu shrines of Kedarnath and Badrinath, then visited by 60,000 pilgrims annually.

Corbett's sister Maggie tried to dissuade her brother, now fifty years old, but was unsuccessful. He hunted the leopard for ten weeks in the autumn of 1925, sometimes with Ibbotson and sometimes alone, on some occasions coming close and on one terrifying occasion being hunted himself, before reaching the limits of his endurance and returning home. He returned early the next year, and again searched for several weeks. On the final night he was due to spend at Rudraprayag—he had put off urgent business in East Africa for three months already—he baited and fatally shot the leopard.

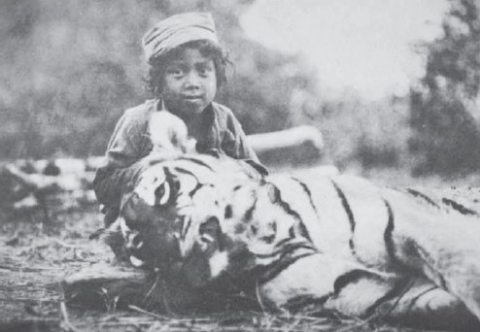
The Talla Des man-eater, with the grandson of its last victim

Over the next several years, Corbett continued hunting man-eating tigers. When shooting the Talla Des man-eater in April 1929, he suffered from an abscess in his ear which almost deafened him permanently. That year, he began hunting the Tigers of Chowgarh, shooting first the cub and subsequently, on 11 April 1930, its mother. These were followed by: the Kanda man-eater in July 1932; the Mohan man-eater, likely around May 1933; the Chuka man-eater in April 1938; and the Thak man-eater in November of that year. He shot his final man-eater at the age of 71 after the Second World War.

=== Conservation ===
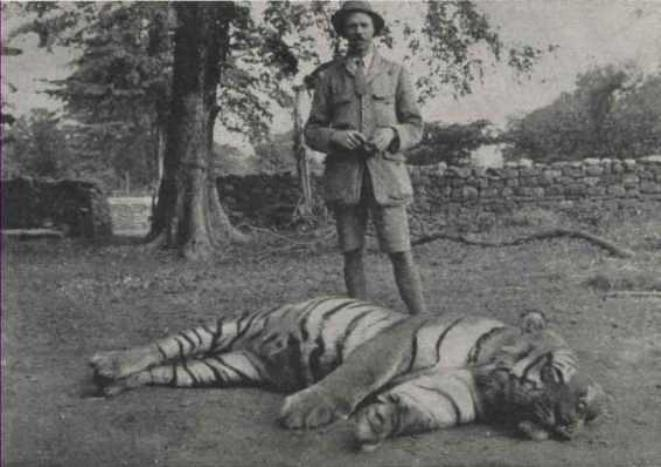
Corbett with the slain Bachelor of Powalgarh, 1930

On his trips to East Africa in the 1920s, Corbett began to compare the untouched grasslands there to the increasingly exploited forests in India. This kickstarted his thoughts on what would become known as conservationism, although for the time being he continued to hunt for sport, shipping antelope trophies back to India and killing the famous large tiger called the Bachelor of Powalgarh in 1930. His biographer Martin Booth noted that Corbett never "truly resolved a conflict of ideals" between his love for the forest and animals and some desire to exploit them for himself, such as in his continuing organisation of tiger shoots.

Corbett likely bought his first camera in Britain or Bombay on his way back from the Western Front. He was in possession of one by the time he went on a hike with an Eton College schoolmaster in September 1921. Corbett was fascinated by the photography of his acquaintance Frederick Walter Champion, who devised ways of recording tigers on cine film. He soon came to appreciate that unlike a trophy, which soon loses its colour and elegance, photographs lasted forever, did not result in an animal's death, and required somewhat greater skill—because the early cameraman had to get much closer than the rifleman. In a ten-year project, he constructed a "studio" around a jungle stream near his home, where he arranged foliage, hiding places, and hydrology to draw tigers to be filmed. His greatest success came in early 1938, when he filmed seven tigers, including one white, present simultaneously on the bank of the stream.

In the 1930s, Corbett felt increasingly aggrieved at the degradation of the forests. He began writing to newspapers to condemn over-shooting and ruthless deforestation. These letters criticised shooting laws, called for conservation funds to be established, and censured over-eager hunters. In collaboration with Malcolm Hailey, governor of the United Provinces, he established an conservationist association named "The All India Conference for the Preservation of Wild Life". In 1934, he persuaded Hailey to establish India's first national park over 300 square kilometres (120 mi^{2}) of forest in the Ramganga river valley; in 1957, it was renamed the Jim Corbett National Park. The legislation introduced to protect this reserve was far ahead of its time, compared to other parts of India.

== Personal life ==
Corbett never married. His biographer Martin Booth dismissed suggestions that he was homosexual, instead citing his personal demeanor and his economic, social, and familial circumstances. As a "domiciled" Anglo-Indian, Corbett was inferior socially to any young women from Britain looking for a husband, especially considering his isolated and somewhat primitive life at Mokameh Ghat. He was also generally quiet and introverted. This lack of social confidence was encouraged by his mother Mary, who was intensely protective of all her sons, perhaps motivated by a desire to be looked after in old age. In 1902, she and Maggie, who was similarly jealous of any potential wife for Jim, managed to obstruct his courtship of a holidaying English girl with whom he had fallen in love. Within months of Mary Corbett's death on 16 May 1924, Jim fell deeply in love with a nineteen-year-old woman named Helen, who was on holiday in India with her parents. She was flattered by his devoted courtship but was not certain about the prospect of marriage to him; her family and Jim's friends considered them totally unsuitable for each other. Rebuffed, he withdrew. On a trip to Britain in 1928, he stopped in Edinburgh to make a final bid for Helen's hand in marriage, but found she was engaged.

It was common practice for European men to have affairs with Indian women of good standing; it is possible Corbett did so, either at Mokameh Ghat or in Naini Tal. For many years, through love letters and private visits, he conducted an affair with Jean Ibbotson, the wife of his good friend William, who may have known about and condoned the relationship. Jean was extroverted, pretty, a skilled huntress, and a lover of nature; it is likely she played a part in Corbett's increasing conservationism.

Corbett formed a number of close friendships with Indians, most notably his bearers, who served as a mix of army batmen and butlers. The two Corbett was closest to were Mothi Singh, who probably served Corbett the longest, and Madho Singh, who was notably present when Corbett killed the Chowgarh tigress. He also forged a close friendship and business relationship with Bahadar Shah Khan, the Muslim headman of Chhoti Haldwani, who was an intermediary between Corbett and the village's inhabitants, and who on occasion served as Corbett's bearer or even advisor.

Corbett received the Kaisar-i-Hind Medal, usually given for services to India, in the 1928 New Year Honours. In 1942, he was made an officer of the Order of the British Empire for his hunting exploits and his wartime service, and he was made a Companion of the Order of the Indian Empire in the King's 1946 Birthday Honours.

=== Writing career ===
Corbett's initial forays into writing began in the 1920s, with submissions of jungle stories to Indian journals and the prominent British magazine Blackwood's, but most were initially rejected. He persevered, interested in both setting down a record of his adventures and promoting his conservationist impulses. His first book, titled Jungle Stories and containing seven individual tales, was published in 1935. Only a hundred copies were privately printed; they are now collector's items.

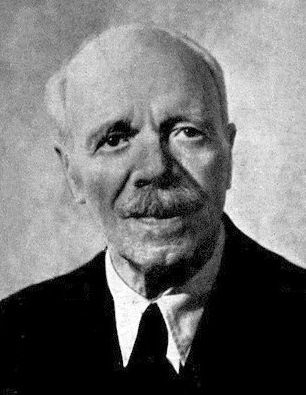
Jim Corbett in 1944

He wrote his following book during his recovery from typhus in 1943. The original title was again Jungle Stories, and Corbett intended it to have a small print run, with all profits going towards St Dunstan's charity for blind servicemen. It consisted of the stories of seven tiger hunts, a story about his dog Robin, a story about fishing, and a two-page essay promoting wildlife photography over trophy hunting. The Bombay branch of Oxford University Press offered to publish the book, but suggested changing the "bland" name: Man-Eaters of Kumaon was published in August 1944 at the initial price of five rupees for a hardback copy.

Man-Eaters of Kumaon met with critical and commercial success, and Corbett became a regional celebrity. A second edition was published in Madras in September 1945; a third in Britain and the United States the following year, with a luxury reception at The Pierre hotel in New York. In four years, it was translated into nine languages and six Indian dialects; it remained in print for thirty years and had sold more than four million copies by 1980. Universal Pictures bought the film rights, but decided against a script which Corbett approved of; the final film, directed by Byron Haskin and starring Sabu, Wendell Corey and Joanne Page bore little resemblance to its namesake book and was a total flop. Corbett said "that the best actor was the tiger".

Because of Man-Eaters of Kumaon's success, Oxford University Press desired that Corbett publish a follow up, and he duly obliged in 1948 with The Man-Eating Leopard of Rudraprayag, which like his other publications had a conservationist subtext, but unlike them was the retelling of a single sustained narrative. Described by Booth as Corbett's "best book", it sold well but not as well as its predecessor. My India was published in 1952 when the Corbetts had moved to East Africa, and remained in print in India until at least 1986. It has been described as "rich evocations of Indian rural life viewed from [Corbett's] unusual standpoint". Jungle Lore and The Temple Tiger were published in the Octobers of 1953 and 1954 respectively, and both were quickly reprinted. His last book, Tree Tops, was published in 1955.

== Later life and death ==
Corbett was worried by the growth of the Indian independence movement in the interwar period, especially after the civil unrest caused by the arrest of Mahatma Gandhi in 1930. Foreseeing a day when those of European origin would no longer be welcome in India, he began to wind down his physical assets in the country and reinvested the money in annuities and life insurance. By 1941, he had sold nearly all of his business holdings in Nani Tal. With Indian independence fast approaching after the Second World War, Corbett believed that he and his sister Maggie would soon become second-class citizens in an anti-British India. Like many other Anglo-Indians, they thus resolved to emigrate: they chose East Africa where Corbett had many contacts, in addition to family members such as his nephew Lieutenant General Thomas Corbett. With the febrile political atmosphere stoking fears of the carnage of a second Indian Rebellion, and with Jim nearly dying of a combination of malaria and pneumonia, they sold Gurney House on 21 November 1947 and departed Naini Tal nine days later.

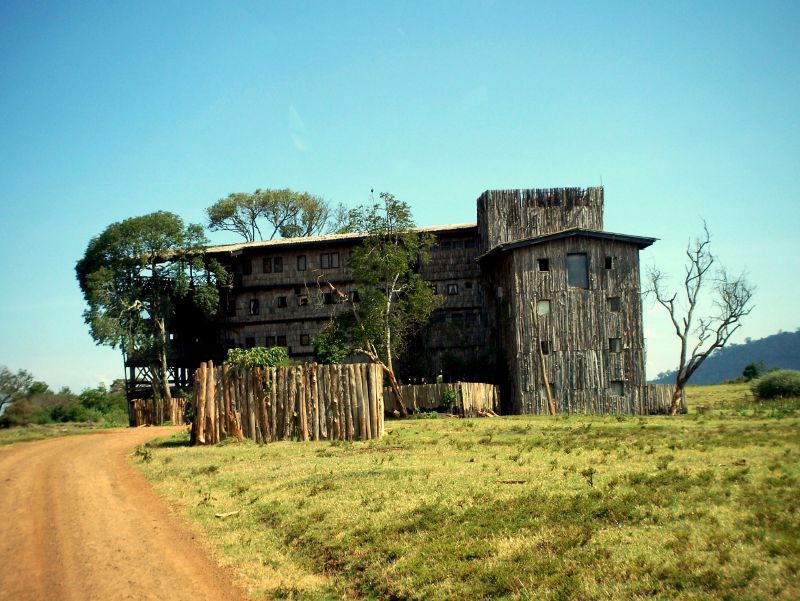
Treetops Hotel, rebuilt in 1957 after the original structure was burned down in 1954.

Jim and Maggie travelled to Bombay via Lucknow, and there embarked on a ship to Mombasa, where they arrived on 15 December. After short stays with the Ibbotsons in Karen, near Nairobi, with their friends the Nestors in isolated Kipkaren, and with Tom Corbett in Mweiga, they rented the cottage named Paxtu at the Outspan Hotel in Nyeri, which had originally been built for Lord Baden-Powell. Corbett occupied himself with photography of African subjects as far afield as Uganda, with fishing trips to the coral reefs of Malindi, visits to the ruins of Gedi, and investments in a safari company; he and Maggie also made visits to Britain in 1951 and 1953.

One of the attractions of the Outspan site was the renowned Treetops Hotel, where Corbett often stayed either as a guest or as an honorary guide. On 5 February 1952, he was requested to accompany Princess Elizabeth during her stay at Treetops. That evening, he pointed out wildlife to her and discussed the Abominable Snowman with her husband Prince Philip, and he sat up at night to keep vigil against leopards. Unknown to the party, Elizabeth's father George VI died during the night and she ascended to the throne as Elizabeth II. Corbett would write in the visitors' logbook:

For the first time in the history of the world, a young girl climbed into a tree one day a Princess and after having what she described as her most thrilling experience she climbed down from the tree next day a Queen.

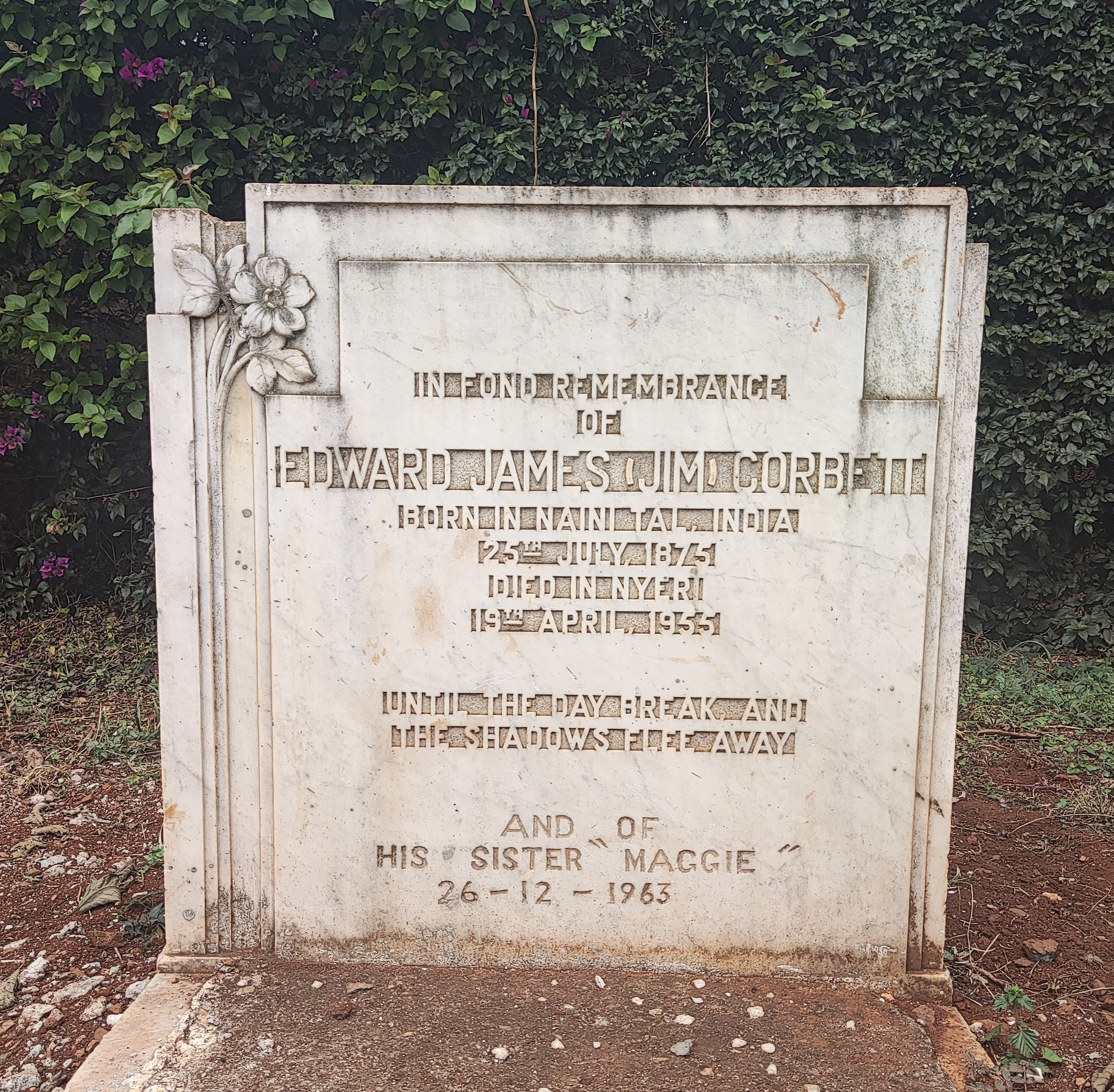
Grave in Nyeri

Corbett's 1947 bout of pneumonia had inflicted lesions on his lungs which his smoking irritated. At Nyeri's altitude, 3,000 feet (910 m) above sea level, he coughed badly, often had difficulty breathing, and was taken to hospital with bronchitis on several occasions between 1949 and 1955. He suffered a severe heart attack on the morning of 19 April 1955, and although he was quickly rushed to hospital, he died later that day. His last words to Maggie were: "Always be brave, and try to make the world a happier place for others." He was buried at St. Peter's Anglican Church in Nyeri. Many obituaries were published in British and American newspapers, authored by notables including the sons of Governor-Generals Lord Willingdon and Linlithgow.

Over the following decades, Corbett's books continued to be published and widely read while his house near Kaladhungi was turned into a museum. The Hailey National Park was renamed the Jim Corbett National Park in 1957, and it was later chosen for the successful Project Tiger conservation initiative. In 1968, the Indochinese tiger, one of the five remaining subspecies of tigers, was named Panthera tigris corbetti after him.

== See also ==
- Kenneth Anderson
- Pachabdi Gazi
- Literary references to Nainital
- Hunter-naturalists of India
- List of big-game hunters
