= Champawat Tiger =

Bengal tigress responsible for over 400 deaths

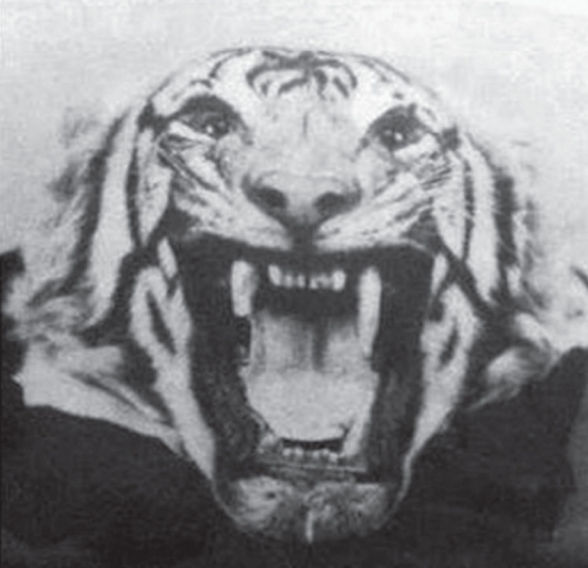
- Other names: Champawat tigress, Demon of Champawat, Devil of Champawat, Maneater of Champawat
- Species: Bengal tiger
- Sex: Female
- Born: c. 1895–1897
- Died: 1907 (aged 10–12)
- Cause of death: Shot to death by Jim Corbett
- Known for: Killing and eating 436 people

The Champawat Tiger was a female Bengal tiger responsible for an estimated 436 deaths in Nepal and the Kumaon division of India, during the last years of the 19th century and the first years of the 20th century. She was shot and killed on 12 May 1907 by the 31-year-old Jim Corbett after a hunt involving a beat with 298 men.

== History ==
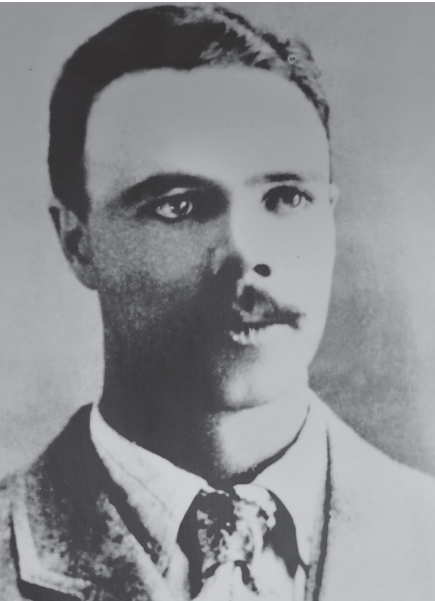
Jim Corbett c. 1907, the year he killed the tiger

The Champawat Tiger began her attacks in the village Rupal in western Nepal. Hunters were sent in to kill the tiger, but she managed to evade them and continued to hunt. The number of fatalities became so high that the Nepali Army was called in. Despite failing to capture or kill the tiger, soldiers organised a massive beat and managed to force the tiger to abandon her territory and drive her across the border river Sarda into India, where she continued her killing activities in the Kumaon District.

The tiger would adjust her hunting strategy so as to best hunt and evade humans, travelling great distances between villages, as much as 32 km (20 mi) a day, undertaken at night in her new territory both to claim new victims and evade pursuers. Her behaviour became more like a Siberian tiger in her habits and she created a larger territory to encompass multiple villages in the Kumaon area, with Champawat being close to the centre of her territory. Most of her victims were young women and children, who often went into the forest to collect firewood, feed livestock, and gather resources for craft work. In 1907, the tiger was killed by British hunter Jim Corbett. The tiger had killed a 16-year-old girl, Premka Devi, in the village of Fungar and left a trail of blood, which Corbett followed. After nearly getting ambushed by the tiger while investigating the remains of its victim and scaring her off with two shots from his rifle, Corbett had to abandon the hunt, deciding to use villagers and to organise a beat the next day in the Champa River gorge. With the help of the tehsildar of Champawat, the beat was organised with 298 villagers, and the next day, about noon, Corbett shot the tigress dead. Corbett's first shots hit the tigress in the chest and shoulder, and his last shot, made with the tehsildar's rifle to keep it from charging him after he ran out of bullets, hit her in the foot, causing it to collapse 6 m (20 ft) from him. Further examinations made by Corbett during his hunt for the tiger indicated that she was in healthy condition physically (other than her teeth) and was between 10 and 12 years old. "After bringing down the Champawat Tiger, Jim Corbett acquired a reputation as the leading hunter of man-eaters. This ability served him well, at a time when deforestation and diminishing prey were driving more and more tigers and leopards to hunt humans for food."

== Champawat town ==
In Champawat, near the Chataar Bridge and on the way to Lohaghat, there is a "cement board" marking the place where the tigress was finally brought down. The details about the Champawat Tigress and how she was brought down can be found in the book Maneaters of Kumaon (1944), written by Corbett himself.

== See also ==
- Bachelor of Powalgarh
- Gaver Tigers (man-eating tigers of Nepal)
- Tiger attack
- Tipu's Tiger
