= Chukka =

Chukka can refer to:

- A period of play in polo, also spelled chukker, which is 7 minutes long.
- A period of play in field hockey, which is 15 minutes long.
- Chukka boots, a type of ankle-length boot
- Chukka Ramaiah (born 1928), Indian educationist and politician
- A curry dish in India made by sauteeing a choice of meat with spices
