= Tiger attack =

Most common form of big-cat attack on human beings

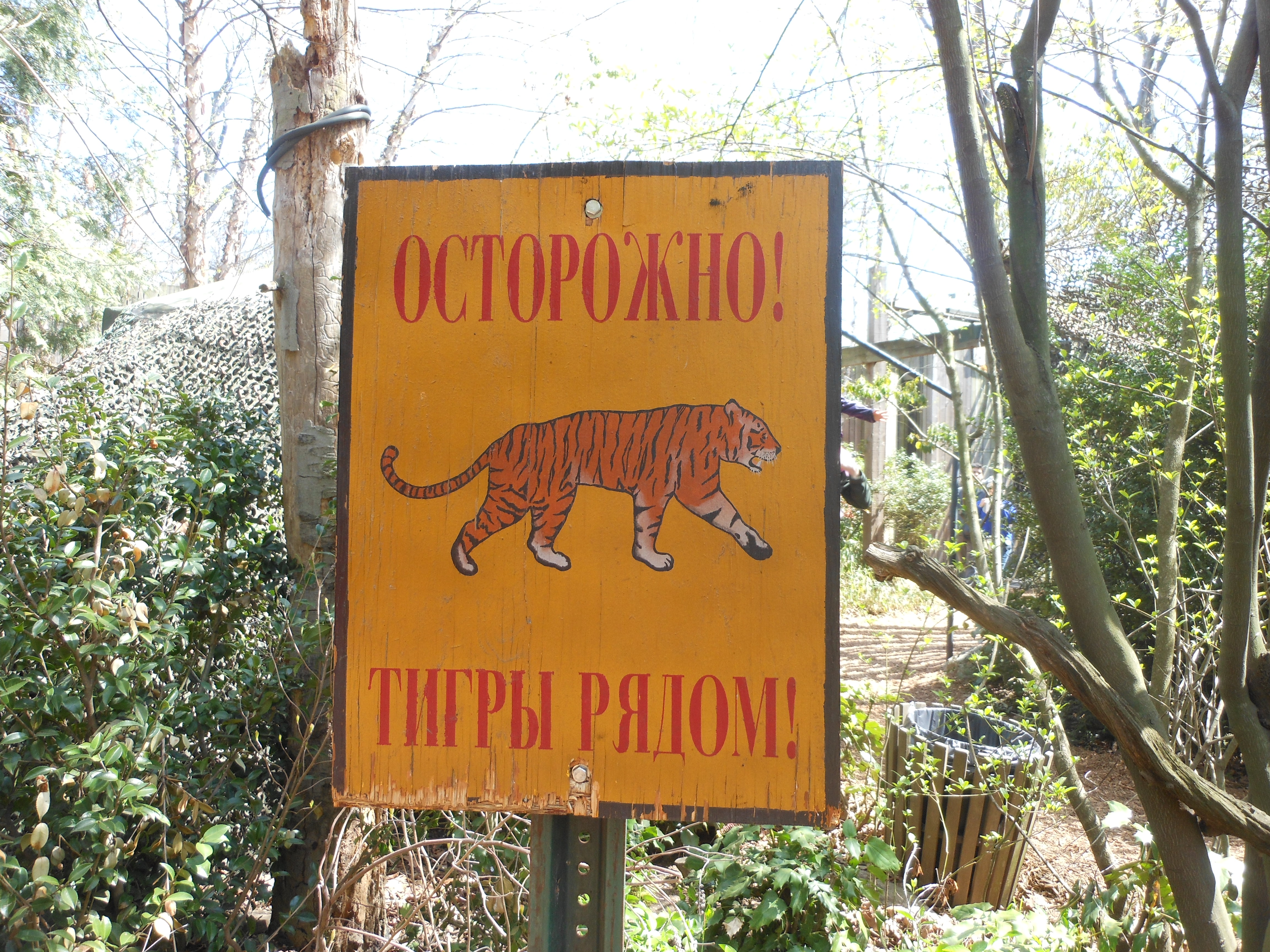
"Caution Tigers Nearby" Sign in Russian

Tiger attacks are a form of human–wildlife conflict which have killed more humans than attacks by any of the other big cats, with the majority of these attacks occurring in Bangladesh, India, Nepal, and Southeast Asia.

== Reasons for attacking ==
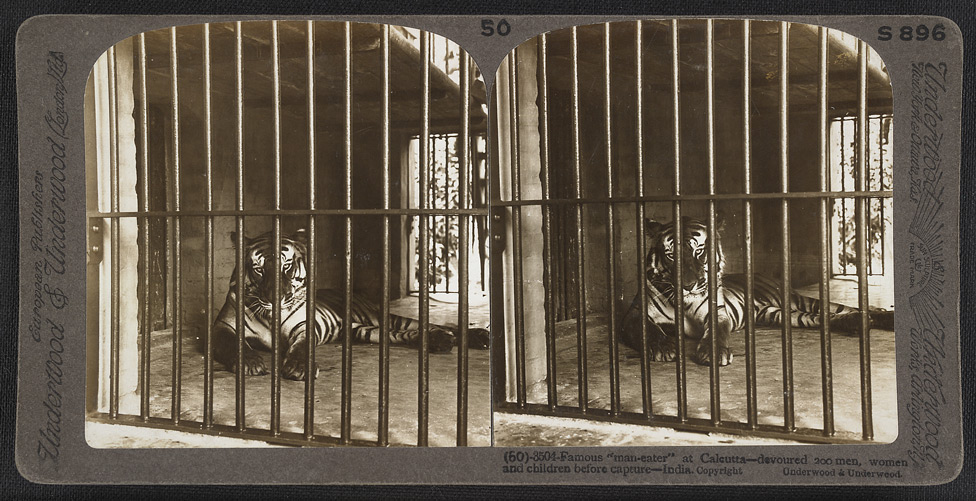
Stereographic photograph (1903) of a Man-eating tiger, who had killed an estimated 200 people, in the Calcutta zoo

Like most other predators, tigers tend to attack humans only while hunting or when they feel threatened. If a human comes too close and surprises a sleeping or feeding tiger, or a tigress with her cubs, the tiger is prone to respond with aggression. Tigers have also been known to attack humans in cases of "mistaken identity" (for example, if a human is crouching while collecting firewood, or cutting grass) and sometimes when a tourist gets too close. Some also recommend not riding a bicycle, or running in a region where tigers live, so as not to provoke their instinct to chase. Peter Byrne wrote about an Indian postman who was working on foot for many years without any problems with resident tigers, but was chased by a tiger soon after he started riding a bicycle for his work.

While in modern times there are on average fewer than 85 people killed and injured by tigers worldwide each year, India has seen sharp increases in absolute numbers of tiger attacks in recent years, as was the case in 2014 and 2015, as a result of human population growth and the expansion of human settlements into the tiger's natural habitat. Many human fatalities and injuries are due to incidents at zoos, or to the man-eating tigers in certain parts of South Asia.

In some cases, tigers will change their natural diet to become man-eaters. This is usually due to a tiger being incapacitated by a gunshot wound or porcupine quills, or some other factors, such as health issues and disabilities. In such cases, the animal's inability to hunt traditional prey forces it to stalk humans, which are dangerous, but generally much easier to chase, overpower, and kill if found alone and/or unarmed. This was the case with the man-eating tigress of Champawat, which was believed to have begun eating villagers at least partially in response to crippling tooth injuries. As tigers in Asia often live in close proximity to humans, tigers have killed more people than any other big cat species. Between 1876 and 1912, tigers killed 33,247 people in British India.

Man-eating tigers have been a recurrent problem in India, especially in Kumaon, Garhwal and the Sundarbans mangrove swamps of Bengal. There, even otherwise healthy tigers have been known to hunt humans. However, there have also been mentions of man-eaters in old Indian literature, so it appears that after the British occupied India, built roads into forests and brought the tradition of shikar, man-eaters became a much bigger problem. Although tigers usually avoid elephants, they have been known to jump on an elephant's back to attack the mahout riding it. Kesri Singh mentioned a case when a fatally wounded tiger attacked and killed the hunter who had wounded it while the hunter was on the back of an elephant. Most man-eating tigers are eventually captured, shot or poisoned. In extreme situations, such as during droughts, tigers have hunted vulnerable or lost elephants (subapex-sized or calves) themselves for food.

According to various sources, cases of man-eating tigers in the Russian Far East were always rare or not recorded at all over long periods.

During war, tigers may acquire a taste for human flesh from the consumption of corpses which have lain unburied, and go on to attack soldiers; this happened during the Vietnam and Second World Wars. Tigers will stalk groups of people bending down while working in a field or cutting grass, but will lose interest as soon as the people stand upright. Consequently, it has been hypothesized that some attacks are a simple case of mistaken identity.

Tigers typically surprise victims from the side or from behind: either approaching upwind or lying in wait downwind. Tigers rarely press an attack if they are seen before their ambush is mounted.

Kenneth Anderson once commented on man-eating tigers,

It is extraordinary how very cautious every man-eater becomes by practice, whether a tiger or panther and cowardly too. Invariably, it will only attack a solitary person, and that too, after prolonged and painstaking stalking, having assured itself that no other human being is in the immediate vicinity... These animals seem also to possess an astute sixth sense and be able to differentiate between an unarmed human being and an armed man deliberately pursuing them, for in most cases, only when cornered will they venture to attack the latter, while they go out of their way to stalk and attack the unarmed man.

Tigers are sometimes intimidated from attacking humans, especially if they are unfamiliar with people. Tigers, even established man-eating tigers will seldom enter human settlements, usually sticking to village outskirts. Nevertheless, attacks in human villages do occur.

Most tigers will only attack a human if they cannot physically satisfy their needs otherwise. Tigers are typically wary of humans and usually show no preference for human meat. Although humans are relatively easy prey, they are not a desired source of food. Thus, most man-eating tigers are old, infirm, or have missing teeth, and choose human victims out of desperation. In one case, a post-mortem examination of a killed tigress revealed two broken canine teeth, four missing incisors, and a loose upper molar, handicaps which would make capturing stronger prey extremely difficult. Only upon reaching this stage did she attack a workman.

In some cases, rather than being predatory, tiger attacks on humans seem to be territorial in nature. In at least one case, a tigress with cubs killed eight people entering her territory without consuming them at all.

== Tiger attacks in the Sundarbans ==
The Bengal tigers of the Sundarbans, bordering India and Bangladesh, used to regularly kill fifty or sixty people a year. This was strange given that the tigers were usually in prime condition and had adequate prey available. Approximately 100 tigers live in this region, possibly the largest single population anywhere in the world. By 2023, the official count of the Forest Department dropped to two or three deaths a year while the numbers tallied by unions, non-governmental organizations (NGOs) and activist groups, put it at anything between 10 and 25 deaths a year. Other modern estimates are even higher, at over 100 fatalities a year. Many such attacks go unreported to the authorities because victims enter parts of the forest without legal permission. Despite the notoriety associated with this area, humans are only a supplement to the tigers' diet; they do not provide a primary food source. Nevertheless, there are over 3,000 "tiger widows" in the Sundarbans.

== Tigers and locations known for attacks ==
=== The Champawat Tiger ===
The Champawat Tiger was a man-eating tigress which purportedly killed some 200 adults before being driven out of Nepal. She moved to Champawat district in the state of Uttarakhand in North India, and continued to kill, bringing her total human kills up to 436. She was finally tracked down and killed on 12 May 1907. She was known to enter villages, even during daylight, roaring and causing people to flee in panic to their huts. The tigress was found and killed by Jim Corbett after he followed the trail of blood the tigress left behind after killing her last victim, a 16-year-old girl. Later examination of the tigress showed the upper and lower canine teeth on the right side of her mouth were broken, the upper one in half, the lower one right down to the bone. This permanent injury, Corbett claimed, "had prevented her from killing her natural prey, and had been the cause of her becoming a man-eater."

=== The Tiger of Segur ===
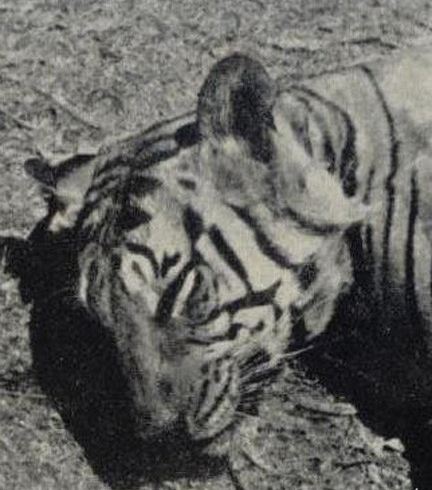
Body of the Tiger of Segur, killed by Kenneth Anderson on the banks of the Segur River

The Tiger of Segur was a young man-eating male Bengal tiger who killed five people in the Nilgiri Hills of Tamil Nadu state in South India. Though originating in the District of Malabar District and Wayanad District below the south-western face of the Blue Mountains, the tiger later shifted his hunting grounds to Gudalur and between the Sigur Plateau and Anaikatty in Coimbatore district. He was killed by Kenneth Anderson on the banks of the Segur River, c. 1954. Anderson later wrote that the tiger had a disability preventing him from hunting its natural prey.

=== Tigers of Chowgarh ===
The Tigers of Chowgarh were a pair of man-eating Bengal tigers, consisting of an old tigress and her sub-adult cub, which for over a five-year period killed a reported 64 people in eastern Kumaon Division of Uttarakhand in Northern India over an area spanning 1,500 square miles (3,900 km^{2}). The figures however are uncertain, as the natives of the areas the tigers frequented claimed double that number, and they do not take into account victims who survived direct attacks but died subsequently. Both tigers were killed by Jim Corbett, the cub in April, 1929, and the mother on April 11, 1930 .

=== Thak man-eater ===
The Thak man-eater was a tigress from Eastern Kumaon division, who killed four human victims, but was the last hunt of the hunter, conservationist and author Jim Corbett. The date was 30th of November 1938, when Corbett called her up and killed her during late twilight, after he lost all other means to track her down. Postmortem revealed that this tigress had two old gunshot wounds, one of which had become septic. This, according to Corbett, forced her to turn from a normal predator hunting natural prey to a man-eater.

=== Tiger of Mundachipallam ===
The Tiger of Mundachipallam was a male Bengal tiger, which in the 1950s killed seven people in the vicinity of the village of Pennagram, four miles (6 km) from the Hogenakkal Falls in Dharmapuri district of Tamil Nadu. Unlike the Segur man-eater, the Mundachipallam tiger had no known infirmities preventing him from hunting his natural prey. His first three victims were killed in unprovoked attacks, while the subsequent victims were devoured. The Mundachipallam tiger was later killed by Kenneth Anderson.

=== Man-eater of Bhimashankar ===
A story was discovered by Pune-based author Sureshchandra Warghade when he ran into an old villager in the Bhimashankar forest which lies near Pune. The villager explained to the author how a man-eating tiger terrorized the entire Bhimashakar area during a span of two years in the 1940s. He was a police constable in that area and he had been responsible for dealing with the formalities surrounding the deaths (missing person reports and death certificates) and other jobs such as helping the hunting parties. During this time the tiger supposedly killed more than 100 people, but it was apparently very careful to avoid discovery; only two bodies were ever found. Several hunting parties were organized, but the only one to succeed was an Ambegaon-based hunter named Ismail. During his first attempt, Ismail had a direct confrontation with the tiger and was almost killed. He later called Kenneth Anderson. They returned and killed the tiger. The tiger predominantly killed the villagers who slept outside the huts.

The authenticity of the story told by the villager was confirmed when Warghade examined official reports, including a certificate given by the British authorities for killing the man-eating tiger.

=== Tara of the Dudhwa National Park ===
While the Sundarbans are particularly well known for tiger attacks, Dudhwa National Park also had several man-eaters in the late 1970s, with 32 people killed over a period of four years in the Kheri region of the Indian state of Uttar Pradesh. The first death was on 2 March 1978 when a Forest Corporation of Satiana employee, identified in the press as Akbar, was attacked while taking a bathroom break. A death from a tiger attack had not been recorded in India since 1962, but authorities concluded that three different tigers (at Satiana, Goia and Sarada) had attacked people in the state. Other deaths followed on 15 March, 3 April and 27 April. The Satiana tiger was shot and killed on 14 August 1978 by a wildlife warden. A tigress who had killed 13 people in Goia was killed on 28 May 1979, but as of 1982, the third tiger at Sarada was still at large and 90 people had been killed since the 1978 attack.

The population demanded action from authorities. The locals wanted the man-eater shot or poisoned. The killings continued, each one making headlines. Officials soon started to believe that the likely culprit was a tigress called Tara. Conservationist Billy Arjan Singh had taken the British-born cat from Twycross Zoo and raised her in India, with the goal of releasing her back into the wild. His experiments had also been carried out on leopards with some success. Experts felt that Tara would not have the required skills and correct hunting techniques to survive in the wild and controversy surrounded the project. She also associated men with providing food and comfort, which increased the likelihood that she would approach villages. Officials later became convinced that Tara had taken to easier prey and become a man-eater. A total of 24 people were killed before the tigress was shot. Singh also joined the hunt with the intent of identifying the man-eater, but firm confirmation of the identity of the tiger was never found. The debate over the tiger's identity has continued in the years since the attacks. Singh's supporters continue to claim that the tiger was not Tara, and the conservationist has produced evidence to that effect. However, officials maintain that the tiger was definitely Tara.

Other man-eaters from Dudhwa National Park have existed, but this tiger was potentially the first captive-bred tiger to be trained and released into the wild. This controversy cast doubt on the success of Singh's rewilding project.

Problems at Dudhwa have been minor in the past few years. Occasional tiger attacks still occur, but these are no higher than at other wildlife reserves. On average, two villagers are attacked at Ranthambhore Tiger Reserve each year. These attacks generally occur during the monsoon season when the locals enter the reserve to collect grass.

=== Tigress of Moradabad ===
In February 2014, reports emerged that a tigress had killed 7 people near the Jim Corbett National Park. The tigress was later called the man-eater of Moradabad, because she was hunting in the Bijnor and Moradabad region. The tigress could not be traced by about 50 camera traps and an unmanned aerial vehicle. In August 2014, it was reported that the tigress had stopped killing humans. Her last victim was killed in February, with a total of 7 victims. The animal remained untraced.

=== Tigress of Yavatmal ===
Between 2016 and 2018, a tigress known as T-1 was said to have killed 13 people in Yavatmal district, in the western Indian state of Maharashtra. The tigress was shot dead after a major hunt in November 2018 after charging those attempting to tranquillise her.

The hunt for the tigress included more than 100 camera traps, bait in the form of horses and goats tied to trees, round-the-clock surveillance from treetop platforms and armed patrols. Drones and a hang glider were also used to try and locate T-1. Wildlife officials also brought in bottles of the perfume Obsession for Men by Calvin Klein, which contains a pheromone called civetone, after an experiment in the US suggested that it could be used to attract jaguars.

=== Tigers of Bardia National Park, Nepal ===
In 2021, four tigers killed ten people and injured several others in Bardia National Park of Nepal. Three of the tigers were captured and transferred to rescue centers. One of the tigers escaped from its cage and is yet to be captured.

The tigers were identified and captured from Gaidamachan on 4 April, from Khata on 18 March and from Geruwa on 17 March. The tigers were found with broken canine teeth, possibly due to fighting between two males. After the capture, one of the tigers escaped from the cage and went back to the forest in Banke district. Two were housed at the rescue facility in Bardia National Park in Thakurdwara and Rambapur. One was transferred to the Central Zoo in Jawalakhel, Kathmandu.

== Measures to prevent tiger attacks ==
Various measures were taken to prevent and reduce the number of tiger attacks with limited success. For example, since tigers almost always attack from the rear, masks with human faces were worn on the back of the head by the villagers in 1986 in the Sundarbans, on the theory that tigers usually do not attack if seen by their prey. Apparently, this did in fact decrease the number of attacks for a short while. Mask-wearing fell out of use after a short time, as the local tiger population reportedly became aware of the technique. Other means to prevent tiger attacks, such as providing the tigers with more prey by releasing captive bred pigs to the reserve's buffer zones, or placing electrified human dummies to teach tigers to associate attacking people with electric shock, did not work as well and tiger attacks continue. Many measures were thus discontinued due to lack of success.

== In captivity ==
Tiger attacks have also happened in zoos and when tigers are kept as exotic pets. Between 1998 and 2001 there were seven fatal tiger attacks in the United States and at least 20 more attacks that required emergency medical care.

- In the 1980s, during rehearsals of a show in the German theme park Phantasialand, the park's founder and owner, Richard Schmidt, was bitten in the arm by one of the tigers.
- In 1985, a pair of Siberian tigers at the Bronx Zoo attacked and killed one of their keepers in an enclosure that was part of the Wild Asia exhibit.
- On 13 June 1991, a zookeeper was attacked and killed by a tiger at a safari park in Gänserndorf, Austria after getting out of his car, which was against the zoo's regulations
- In 1998, Jupiter, a 3-year-old white tiger, killed a 34-year-old man and his 58-year-old wife.
- On 27 February 2003, the 6-year-old Sumatran tiger Rokan mauled mentally ill 29-year-old James Atatagi after he climbed into the enclosure at Wellington Zoo. The victim suffered serious neck, back and head injuries.
- On 3 October 2003, trainer and performer Roy Horn was attacked by a Siberian white tiger during a live stage performance, disabling Horn and prompting the permanent closure of the show.
- In 2005, a 17-year-old girl was killed by a captive Siberian tiger at the Lost Creek Animal Sanctuary in Kansas, while taking her high school graduation photo with the animal.
- In December 2006, a man's arm was ripped off by a tiger after he had entered a restricted area for a photograph at a Spanish circus.
- In 2006, Cynthia Lee Gamble was killed by one of her tigers, Tango.
- In 2006, a zookeeper at the San Francisco Zoo was bitten on the arm by a tiger during a public feeding. In 2007, the same tiger killed one person and injured two others. Police officers intervened, shooting and killing the tiger.
- In 2007, a 32-year-old Canadian woman was killed when her pet Siberian tiger grabbed her leg through the cage and mauled her, causing her to bleed to death.
- On 24 May 2009, a zookeeper at Memphis Zoo was bitten by a Bengal tiger after failing to close two internal safety doors, allowing a tiger to enter an unsecured hallway. The tiger, named Kumari, was sedated and safely placed back in her exhibit.
- In December 2009, the 28-year-old tiger trainer Christian Walliser was mauled by three Bengal tigers during a circus show in Hamburg. His hand had to be amputated and he suffered serious head and chest injuries. Several of the 200 audience members were treated for shock.
- In 2009, at the Calgary Zoo, Vitali, a male Siberian tiger, injured a man trespassing in his enclosure. A handler was also killed by a white tiger in Zion Lion Park.
- On 31 July 2012, Kushalappa Gowda (36), a zookeeper at Pilikula Nisargadhama in Mangalore, India, was killed by an ailing tiger named Raja after he entered the squeeze cage in spite of warnings. The tiger died of a heart attack in May 2015.
- On 25 August 2012, a 43-year-old zookeeper at Cologne Zoological Garden was attacked and killed by a 4-year-old male Siberian tiger called Altai after entering an area that was open for the animals. The tiger was shot by director Theo Pagel.
- In November 2012, a white tiger named Paris escaped its enclosure and attacked three employees at Liberec Zoo. All victims were hospitalized, one suffered from a head injury, the other two had minor injuries.
- On 24 May 2013, Sarah McClay, a 24-year-old woman who had been working at South Lakes Safari Zoo in Cumbria, England, was mauled by a tiger during public feeding time and suffered serious injuries to her head and neck. She died later the same day.
- In September 2013, Siberian tiger Rasputin killed Martin H., a 56-year-old zookeeper at Münster Zoo, by attacking him from behind and biting his neck.
- In July 2014, an 11-year-old boy was attacked by a tiger in a zoo from Paraná, Brazil. His arm was amputated as a result of his injuries.
- In 2014, at the National Zoological Park Delhi in India, 20-year-old Maqsood Khan was killed by a white tiger after he fell into its enclosure.
- In 2015, 43-year-old zoo curator Samantha Kudeweh died after being attacked by a Sumatran tiger at Hamilton Zoo in Hamilton, New Zealand.
- On 14 June 2015, a white tiger escaped its enclosure at Tbilisi Zoo after a flood. Three days later it attacked two people, before the animal was shot by the police. One of them, 43-year-old Otar Tsukhishvili, was killed in a warehouse near the zoo. The flood and the attack sparked protests after the general prosecutor's office opened a criminal case for negligence against the zoo's director.
- In 2016, a 38-year-old woman was killed by Hati, a 13-year-old male tiger, in an enclosure at the Palm Beach Zoo.
- In July 2016, a woman was mauled to death and her female companion was injured by a Siberian tiger at the Badaling Wildlife World animal park near Beijing, China.
- In May 2017, zoo-keeper Rosa King was killed by a Malayan tiger named Cicip at Hamerton Zoo Park in Cambridgeshire, United Kingdom. A metal gate meant to separate the workers from the tiger was open when Rosa went to clean the enclosure, leaving her in the same space as the animal, where she was subsequently attacked.
- In November 2017, a zookeeper at Kaliningrad Zoo was hospitalized after being attacked by the tiger Typhoon. According to the zoo, she had breached safety rules. The employee was saved by visitors who began to shout and threw stones, chairs and tables to the tiger.
- In October 2018, a 19-year-old external employee at Köthen Zoo in Saxony-Anhalt, Germany, was severely injured after being hit by the paw of one of the zoo's two tigers.
- In 2019, Patty Perry, a conservationist, was attacked at her animal sanctuary in Moorpark, California by two tigers during a donor event.
- In 2020, a 55-year-old female zookeeper was killed by Irina, a Siberian tiger, in an enclosure at Zurich Zoo.
- On 3 December 2020 a volunteer was bitten and seriously injured by a tiger named Kimba at Big Cat Rescue animal sanctuary in Florida.
- On February 5, 2021, two Bengal tigers escaped from Sinka Zoo in the city of Singkawang, Indonesia, after their enclosure was damaged by a landslide caused by heavy rain. Feri Darmawan, a 47-year-old zookeeper, was killed by the two tigers. On February 6, 2021, police succeeded in capturing one tiger, while the second was shot dead after a tranquilizer gun proved ineffective.
- In June 2021, a Siberian male tiger killed a Seaview Predator Park employee and another tiger in Gqeberha, South Africa.
- In August 2021 a Bengal tiger killed Catalina Fernanda Torres Ibarra, a 21-year-old female zookeeper, at a safari park in Rancagua, Chile.
- On 29 December 2021, an 8-year-old Malayan tiger named Eko at Naples Zoo in Florida was killed after a cleaner breached barriers after hours and entered an unauthorized area of the tiger enclosure, resulting in the tiger biting his arm. After unsuccessfully attempting to free the man, a deputy shot the tiger.
- On 3 November 2022, a 65-year-old man entered a Siberian tiger enclosure in a private zoo in Hungary to pet the animal. He suffered minor injuries when the tiger bit him.
- In December 2024, a 52-year-old employee at Pitești Zoo in southern Romania was killed by a tiger after not following safety rules.
- On 12 May 2025, a 33-year-old zookeeper at Tierpark Nadermann in Delbrück, Germany, was injured by a 5-year-old male tiger called Dicker. While cleaning the enclosure, the tiger bit her in the hand and the shoulder. After the employee began to scream, the animal let off her and went to another part of the exhibit. The victim then went out of the enclosure and was brought to a hospital in Bielefeld. According to the zoo's director, the tiger (which was born in the zoo) only wanted to play and the bites were just test bites.
- On 20 September 2025, 37-year-old Ryan Easley, the owner of Growler Pines Tiger Preserve in Hugo, Oklahoma, was killed by a tiger that he had raised since it was a cub while performing in front of a crowd that included his wife and daughter.
- On 17 May 2026, a 72-year-old man was severely injured when a tiger owned by an animal trainer in Dölzig near Leipzig, Germany escaped its enclosure. The animal was shot dead by the police, while the victim succumbed to his injuries two months later. The case sparked debates about the private ownership of wild animals, as well as their use in circuses.
- On 10 October 2026, a member of the public died after entering the tiger exhibition at Yorkshire Wildlife Park, Doncaster, South Yorkshire. Police received initial reports at around 13:30 BST of a man entering the enclosure, prompting an air ambulance response. The man died at the scene. South Yorkshire Police have begun an investigation.

== In fiction ==
Shere Khan from The Jungle Book is a vicious Bengal tiger known for hunting humans. After his prey, a small human boy called Mowgli, is adopted by a pack of Indian wolves, he swears to kill the child. The 1975 novel Harimau! Harimau!, written by Mochtar Lubis, tells the story of seven dammar collectors who are attacked by a Sumatran tiger on their way back to their village.

One of the main characters in the pre-Code drama She Made Her Bed (1934) is killed by a captive Sumatran tiger. In Fritz Lang's adventure film The Tiger of Eschnapur (1959), a man-eating tiger attacks the caravan of the female protagonist.

Tiger attacks on humans are shown in the natural horror films Black Zoo (1963), Maneater (2007) and Burning Bright (2010).

== See also ==
- 2015 Tbilisi flood § Animals in streets
- Ming of Harlem
- List of large carnivores known to prey on humans
- Tipu's Tiger
