= Carl D'Silva =

Indian wildlife artist (died 2015)

Carl D'Silva (24 August 1963 – 19 July 2015) was an Indian wildlife artist and naturalist well known for his paintings of birds in many ornithological handbooks and field guides.

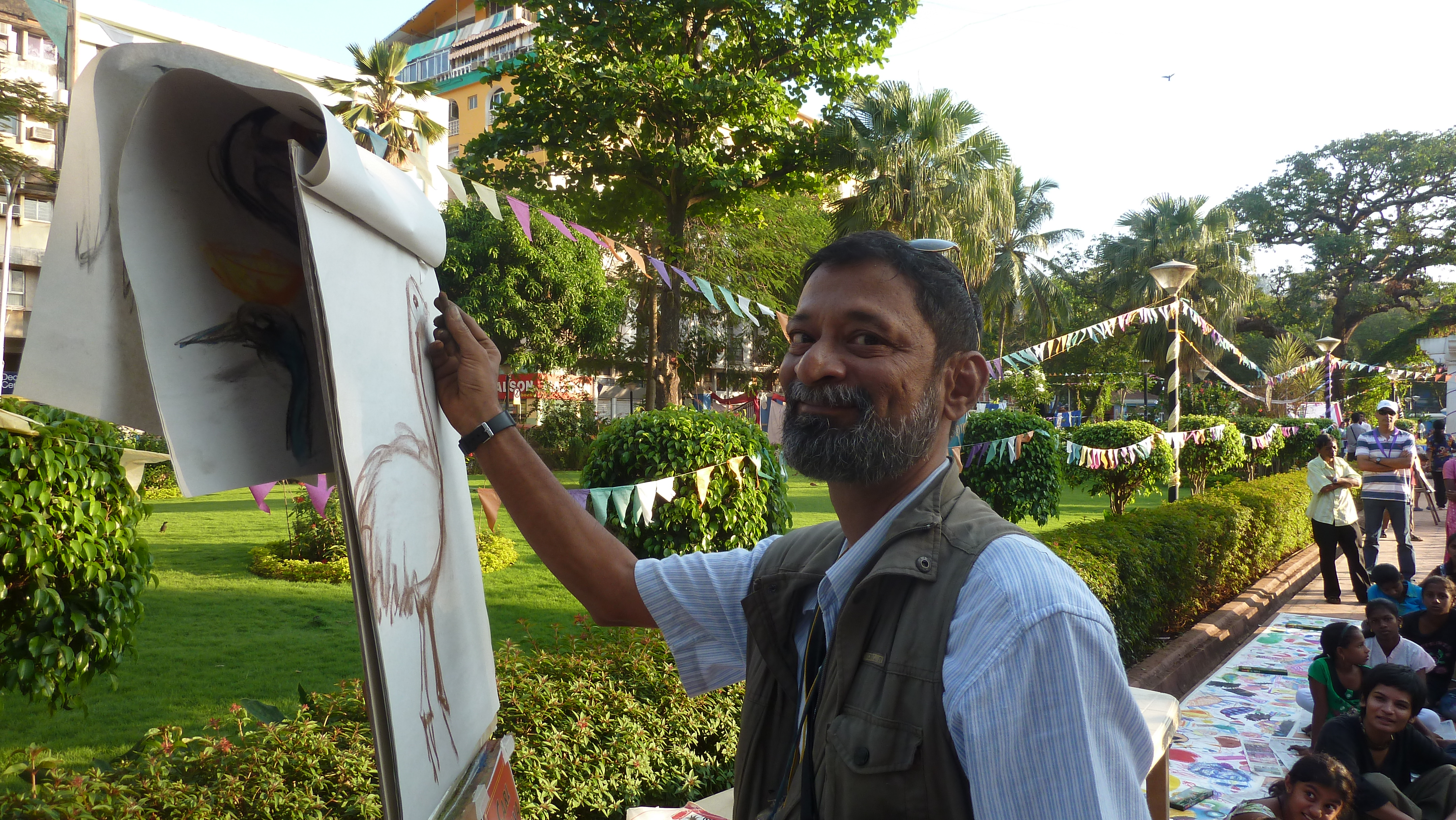
Carl D'Silva, December 2012 photo at Jardin Garcia da Orta, Panjim

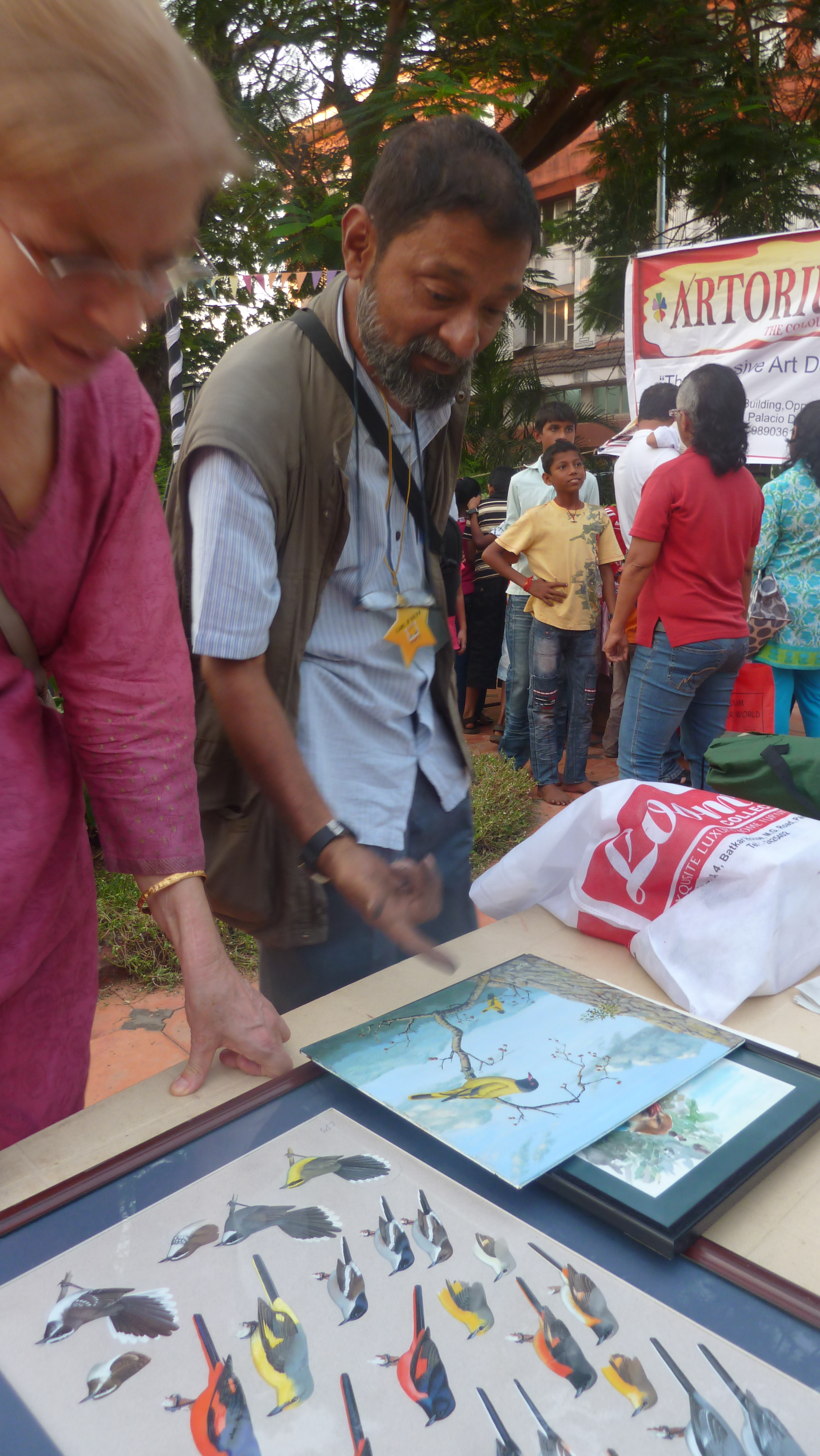
D'Silva demonstrates his work

Born in Goa, D'Silva worked with ornithologist Salim Ali and illustrated several of his books published by the Bombay Natural History Society. When Ali's Book of Indian Birds was revamped for his birth centenary in 2002 (13th ed.), D'Silva re-did all the drawings. He has also illustrated a number of bird field guides produced by Christopher Helm.
