= Weitnauer =

Weitnauer is a surname, derived from the Bavarian town of Weitnau. Notable people with this name include:

- Albert Weitnauer (1916–1984), Swiss diplomat
- Alfred Weitnauer (1905–1974), German writer and historian
- Emil Weitnauer (1905–1989), Swiss ornithologist
- Hermann Weitnauer (1910–1999), German jurist
- Jürg Weitnauer (born 1955), Swiss rower
- Mary Ann Weitnauer, American electrical engineer
- Wolfgang Weitnauer (born 1954), German jurist
