= K. S. R. Krishna Raju =

Indian ornithologist (1948–2002)

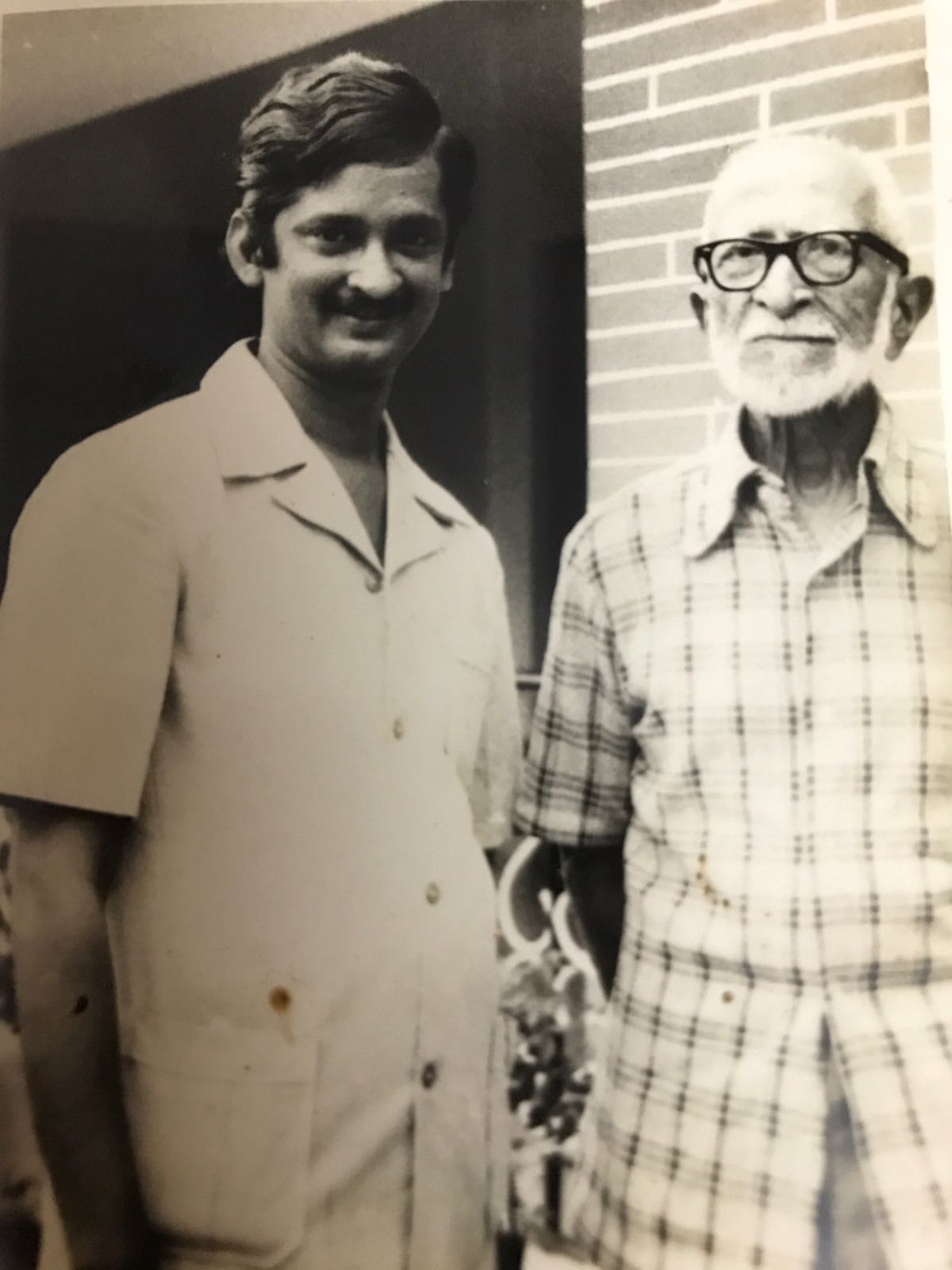
Krisha Raju (left) with Salim Ali in 1975

Kakarlapudi Seeta Rama Krishna Raju or K. S. R. Krishna Raju (11 March 1948 – 22 July 2002) was an Indian ornithologist who worked extensively in the Eastern Ghats of Vishakapatnam. He conducted multiple avifaunal surveys, ringed birds and collaborated with other ornithologists including Dillon Ripley and Salim Ali. His studies provided weight to the Satpura hypothesis proposed by Sunder Lal Hora that the Eastern Ghats was part of a former continuum of habitats between the northeast of India and the Western Ghats with affinities to those in Southeast Asia. A subspecies of Abbott's babbler, Malacocincla abbotti krishnarajui, discovered around Visakhapatnam Ghats of Andhra Pradesh, was named in his honour, "for his efforts to promote the survey and conservation of the natural resources of the Eastern Ghats."

== Biography ==
Krishna Raju was born on 11 March 1948 to K.V.V. Gopala Raju and Sita Devi. He was a brother of the journalist K. N. Y. Patanjali.

Raju joined the Bombay Natural History Society (BNHS) as a field biologist at Point Calimere and worked with S. A. Hussain and was a pioneering Indian bird ringer. In 1971, he set up a bird banding camp at Lambasingi village in the Eastern ghats of Andhra Pradesh where, he along with Selvin Justus discovered the presence of the little spiderhunter a species then known to be isolated in the Western Ghats and found again only in northeastern India and Southeast Asia.

In 1975, Raju joined a team of BNHS members on a study expedition in the Eastern ghats of Vishakapatnam. In 1981 and again in 1983, Raju accompanied Dillon Ripley and Salim Ali for short collection trips. During these trips, they mist-netted an Abbott's babbler, a species the known only from north-east in India and Southeast Asia. This relict population was found to be distinctive and was described as a subspecies that named was after Krishna Raju by Bruce Beehler and Dillon Ripley as Malacocincla abbotti krishnarajui. This was yet another species that gave weight to the Satpura hypothesis suggested by the Indian zoologist Sunder Lal Hora to explain the faunal similarities of Peninsular India and that of Southeast Asia.

Raju continued his efforts in conservation of the Eastern ghats through his publishing efforts until his death.

== Publications ==
Krishna Raju's publications include:

- Price, Trevor & Raju, K.S.R.Krishna (200). "The Eastern Ghats". Sanctuary Asia. XX (4): 28–33. Archived from the original on 5 March 2001.
- K.S.R Krishna Raju; A.V.R.G. Krishna Murthy; C. Subba Reddi; N.A.V. Prasad Reddy; R. Lokaranjan & K.J.N.G. Shankar (1987). "Status Of Wildlife and Habitat Conservation In Andhra Pradesh". Journal of the Bombay Natural History Society. 84 (3): 605–619.
- Raju, K.S.R. Krishna; Shekar, P. B (1971). "Some interesting bird records from Point Calimere". Journal of the Bombay Natural History Society. 68 (2): 457–459.
- Raju, K. S. R. Krishna & Justus, P Selvin (1972). "Movement of Blyth's Reed Warbler (Acrocephalus dumetorum Blyth) through Point Calimere". Journal of the Bombay Natural History Society. 69 (1): 186–187.
- Raju, K. S. R. Krishna & Price, Trevor D (1973). "Tree Sparrow Passer montanus (L.) in the Eastern Ghats". Journal of the Bombay Natural History Society. 70: 557–558.
