= Alfred Schifferli =

Swiss ornithologist (1912–2007)

Alfred Schifferli (20 January 1912 - 19 March 2007) was a Swiss ornithologist who established bird ringing in Switzerland at the Schweizerische Vogelwarte Sempach (Swiss Bird Observatory at Sempach) which was begun by his namesake father and published the first breeding bird atlas of Switzerland in 1980. He also founded the Swiss League for the Protection of Nature (now known as Pro Natura).

Fredi as he was known was the first of four children of Alfred Schifferli (1879-1934) and Else Schifferli-Rosli. Even as a child he took an interest in nature, his father having been one of the pioneer ornithologists of Switzerland. He later became a bird ringer at Lake Sempach. As a student he met Ernst Lang, director of Basel Zoo with whom he maintained a long-term association. He studied business at Neuchatel and spent some time in London where he made contacts with English ornithologists. In 1934 his father died and he decided to study zoology at the University of Basel. He studied under Rudolf Geigy and Adolf Portmann from 1939 to 1944. In 1944 he married Margrit Amrein and they had four children of whom Luc would continue in the field of ornithology. He also established contacts with Emil Weitnauer and David Lack. He produced an atlas of the breeding birds of Switzerland which was published in 1980. In order to produce the book they maintained about 23000 cards on nest records and collected data from 4000 questionnaires. As part of Swiss foreign policy, he was sent to India in 1959 to help train the Indian ornithologist Salim Ali. He also trained Italian ornithologists at Capri. In the 1950s he also worked with Ernst Sutter on using radar to track bird migration over the alps. In the 1950s and 1960s he examined the damage to larch by beetles and the impact on birds. Schifferli also took part in the Planning Commission of the City of Sempach.
