= Lambasingi =

- Village
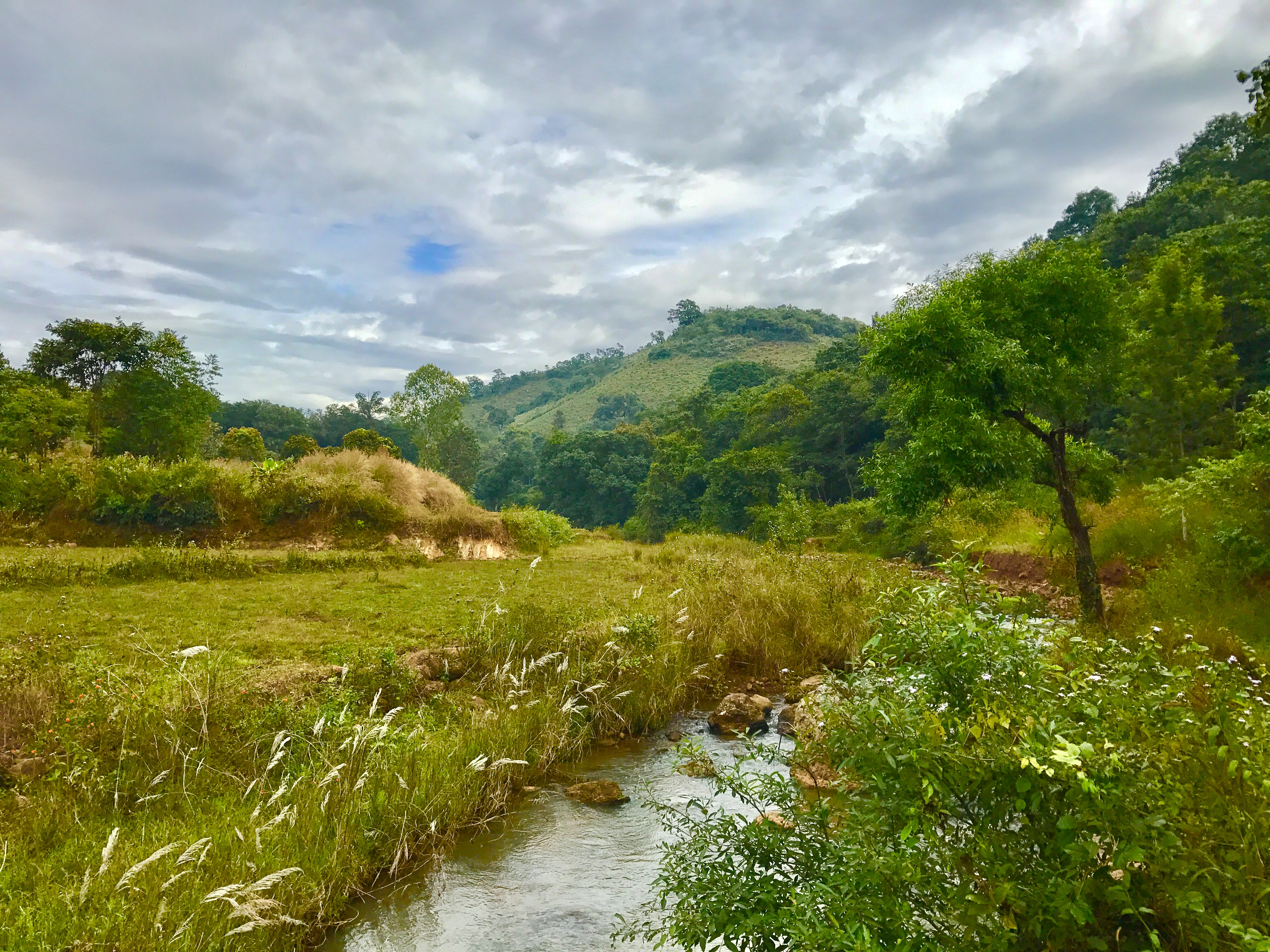
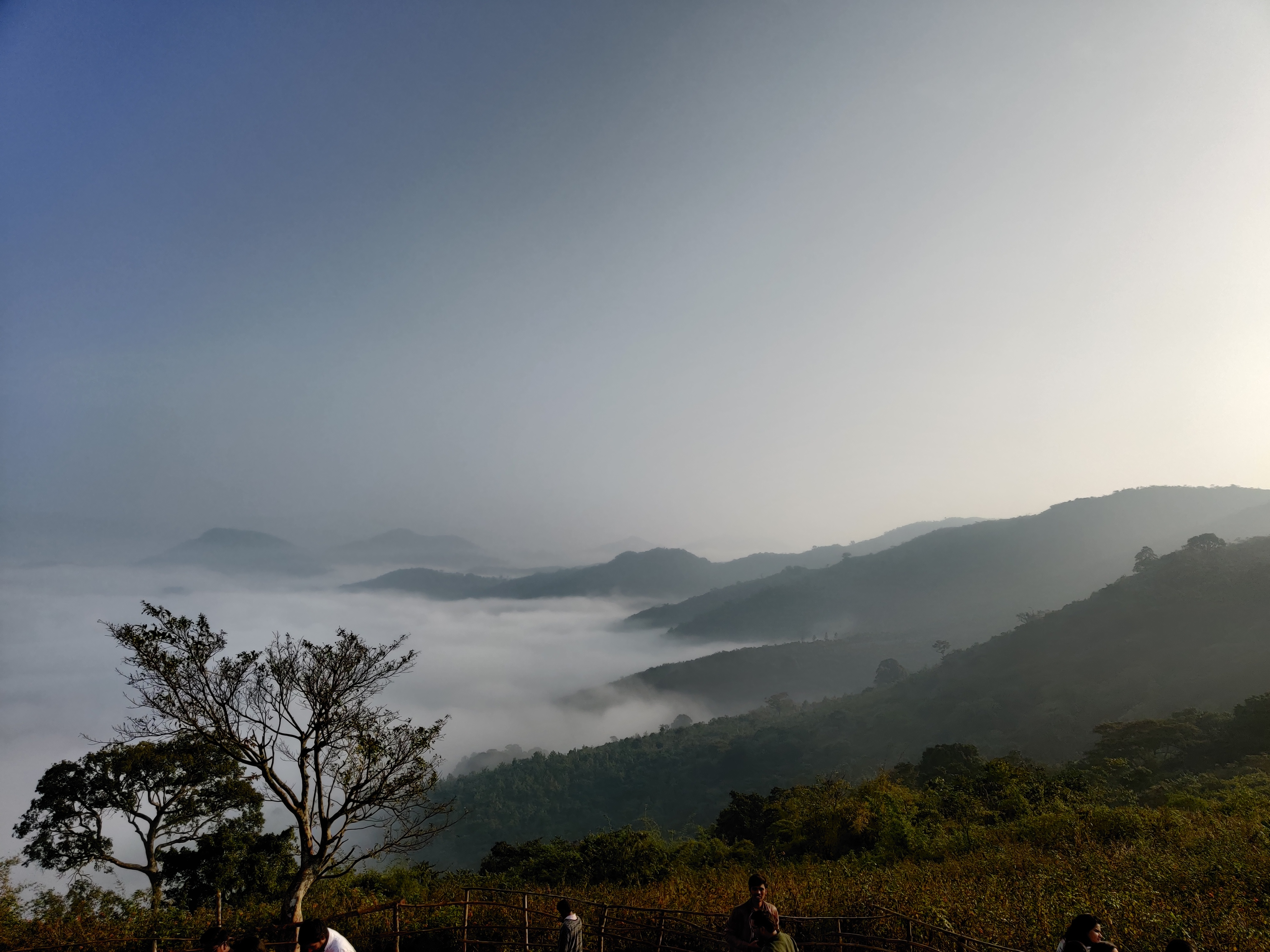
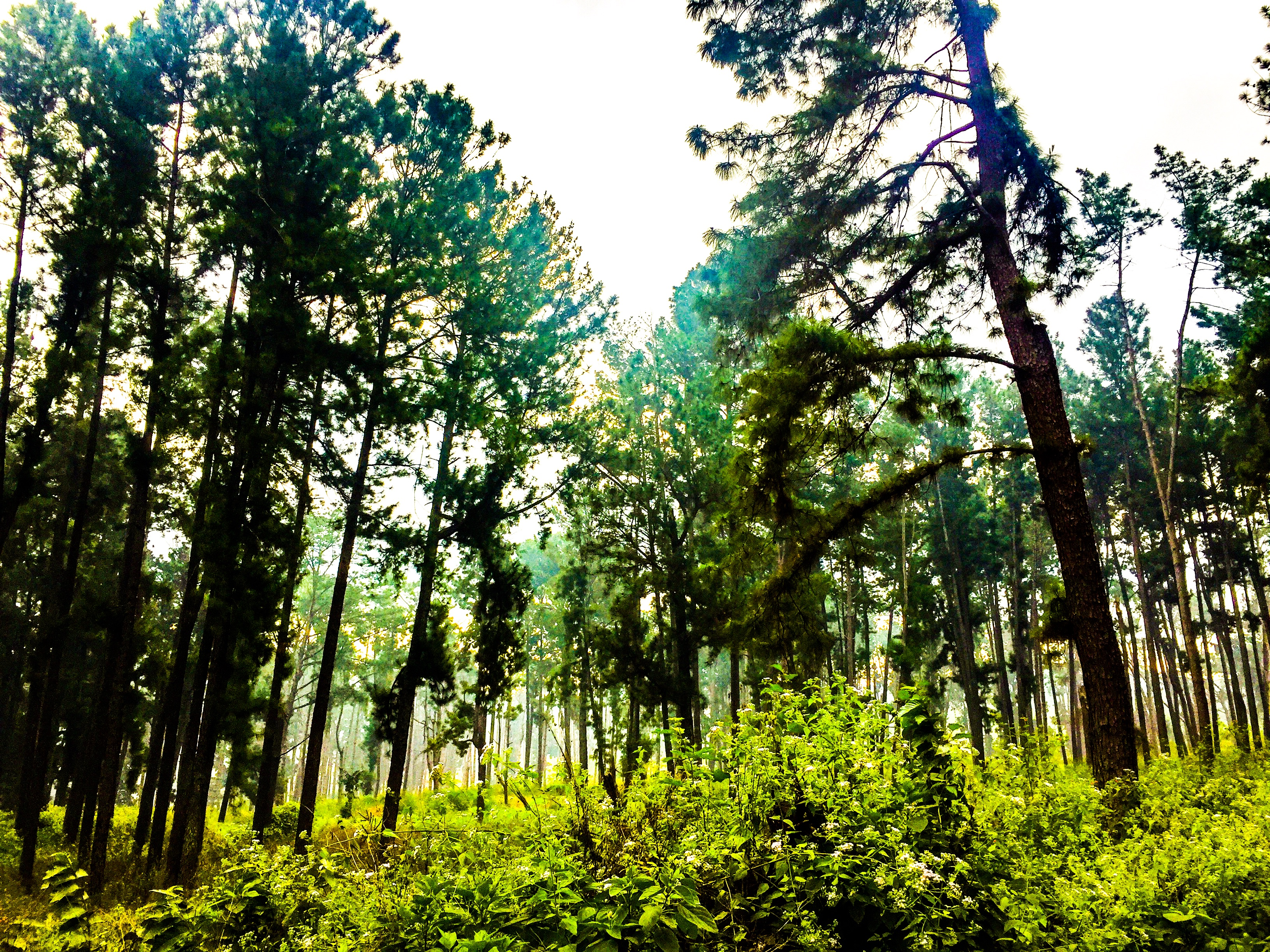
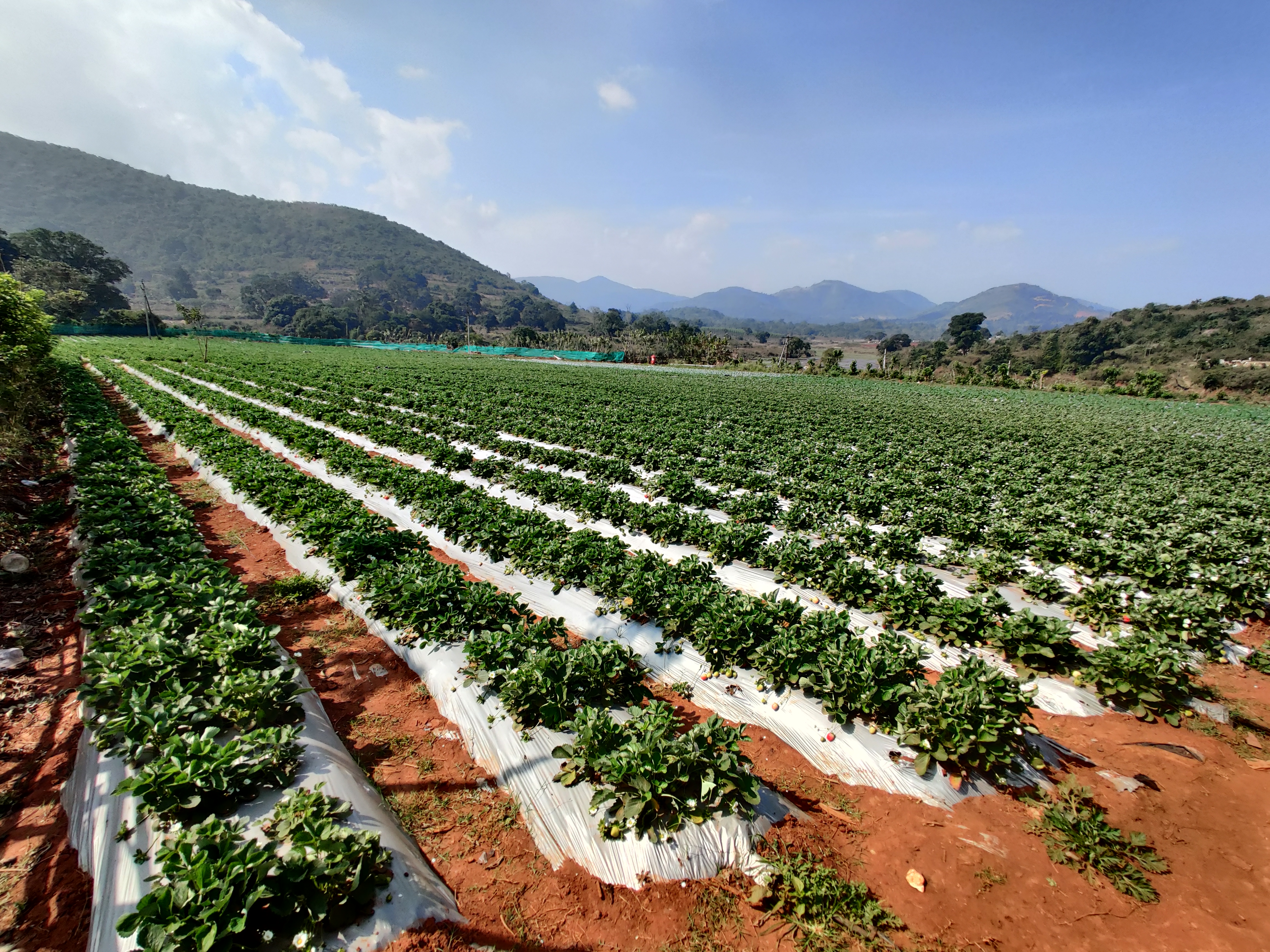
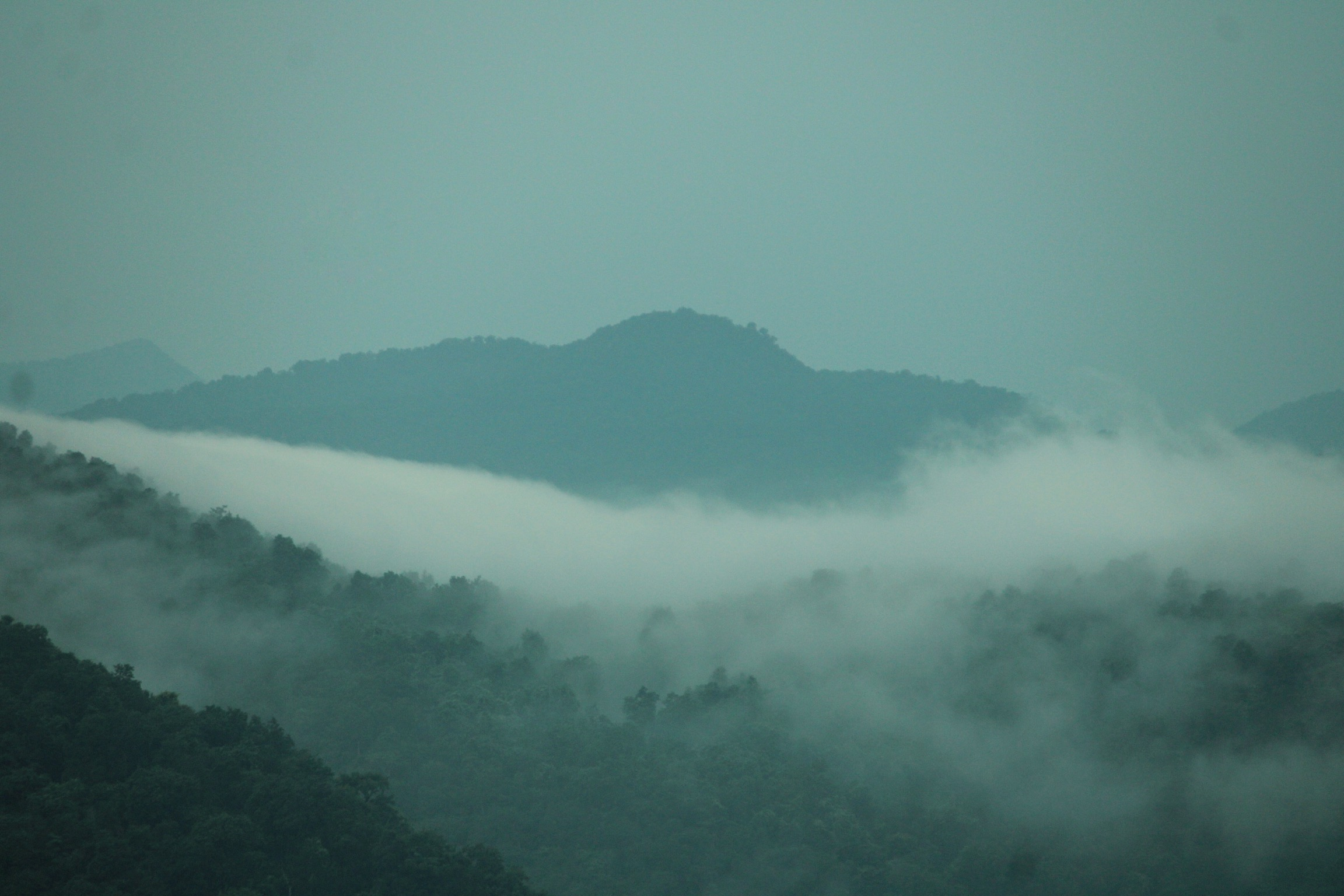
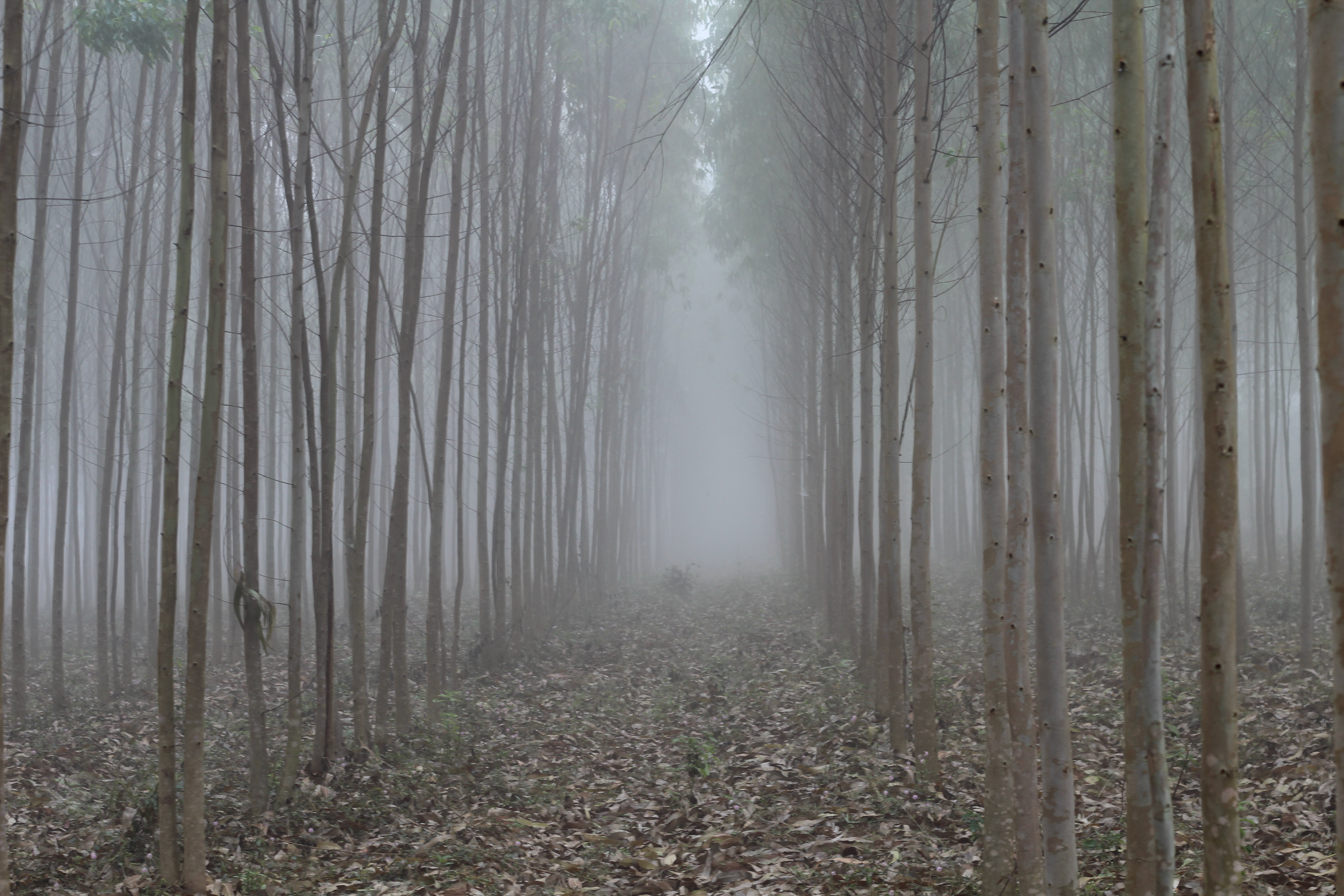
- From top: View from Valley, Lambasinghi Hilltop, Lambasinghi Forest, Strawberry farm, foggy morning, Forest view Valley near Lambasinghi
- Nickname: Kashmir of Andhra Pradesh
- Interactive map of Lambasingi
- Location within Andhra Pradesh
- Coordinates: 17°49′08″N 82°29′35″E
- Country: India
- State: Andhra Pradesh
- District: Alluri Sitharama Raju
- Mandal: Chintapalli
- Established: october 18, 2018
- Elevation: 1,000 m (3,300 ft)

Languages
  - Official: Telugu
- Time zone: UTC+5:30 (IST)
- PIN: 531116
- Website: lambasingi.org.in

Lambasingi (or Lammasingi) is a small village in the Eastern Ghats of Chintapalli Mandal of Alluri Sitharama Raju district in the Indian state of Andhra Pradesh. It's also referred as the "Kashmir of Andhra Pradesh". With an altitude that of 1000 m (3280 ft) above sea level, the area is cooler than the surrounding plains and is covered in moist deciduous forest cover. There are several coffee, pine, and eucalyptus plantations around the area and some small attempts to grow apples and strawberries.

The region was formerly densely covered in forests and known in the past to have supported tigers. The large wildlife in the region includes gaur. The region is known for its diversity of bird life which were studied by numerous ornithologists including Trevor Price, Dillon Ripley, Bruce Beehler and K. S. R. Krishna Raju.

== Climate ==
Temperatures in Lambasingi, on rare occasions in winter, fall below freezing. It is the Southernmost Point in India which Andhra people report to have seen snow, but it is not certain whether hailstones or fog is referred to as snow.

Climate data for Lambasingi, Andhra Pradesh
Month	Jan	Feb	Mar	Apr	May	Jun	Jul	Aug	Sep	Oct	Nov	Dec	Year
Mean daily maximum °C (°F)	22.3 (72.1)	23.1 (73.6)	26.5 (79.7)	28.6 (83.5)	29.4 (84.9)	27.6 (81.7)	23.2 (73.8)	23.1 (73.6)	23.5 (74.3)	22.9 (73.2)	22.1 (71.8)	21.5 (70.7)	24.5 (76.1)
Mean daily minimum °C (°F)	10.1 (50.2)	11.4 (52.5)	14.6 (58.3)	19.9 (67.8)	21.5 (70.7)	21.6 (70.9)	21.0 (69.8)	20.3 (68.5)	20.2 (68.4)	16.1 (61.0)	12.6 (54.7)	9.5 (49.1)	16.6 (61.8)
