= Denison-Crockett South Pacific Expedition =

The Denison-Crockett Expedition (1937–1938) was a scientific expedition organized by Charis Denison Crockett and her husband Frederick Crockett for the Academy of Natural Sciences of Philadelphia.

In 1934 Charis Denison graduated magna cum laude with a bachelor's degree in anthropology from Radcliffe. She married Frederick E. Crockett, M.D., who had been a dog driver on Admiral Byrd's 1928–30 Antarctican expedition. Charis Crockett persuaded her husband to become a photographer on a small expedition to New Guinea, where she would do anthropological research. (In the 1930s, western New Guinea, the ultimate destination of the expedition, was part of the Dutch East Indies.) The Academy of Natural Sciences of Philadelphia sponsored the expedition, which had as members the newly married Crocketts and five other Americans. S. Dillon Ripley was the expedition's zoologist. Besides the Crocketts and Ripley the expedition members were three men, namely the captain (and navigator), a cook, and a sailor, and one woman, "Diddy" Lowndes, who was a friend of Charis Crockett's. The expedition departed from Gloucester, Massachusetts aboard the schooner Chiva, which was owned by the Crocketts. The expedition arrived in October 1937 at Sorong and the Crocketts lived in a house on stilts at the village of Sainke Doek, which was inland from Sorong and served as a station for the sago trade. Charis Crockett wrote a popular book The House in the Rain Forest about their experiences.

The expedition collected 121 fish specimens from 7 locations, most of them in New Guinea; there were 67 species, one of which was new with an allegedly new genus. Fowler named the new species Charisella fredericki but contemporary research rejects the alleged genus Charisella in favor of Melanotaenia. On the island of Biak, Ripley collected 3 specimens of a new subspecies of flying phalanger.

Ripley collected over 300 specimens of birds from Biak, representing most of the island's endemic species. The expedition collected specimens of birds from the Kepuluan Penyu (Schildpad Islands), Misool (Batanme), Salawati and Batanta.

The expedition lasted about 18 months, ending with the return of Ripley and his many specimens to the United States in July 1938.

... Ripley covered thirty thousand miles by water and, in New Guinea, Tahiti, Samoa, the Fijis, and the Solomons, shot and skinned twelve hundred birds, and secured, either by capture or by purchase from dealers, nearly a hundred live birds, among them birds of paradise. Before the end of the trip, Crockett sold the schooner, so Ripley brought his haul back by freighter. Assisted by his mother, who had joined him in New Guinea, he spent most of the voyage, which lasted forty-nine days, cleaning the forty-two cages in which the live birds were quartered and feeding the occupants from supplies consisting of two thousand bananas, a hundred and fifty papaya melons, two crates of lettuce, eight hundred pounds of assorted grain, two hundred pounds of meat, two hundred pounds of fish, several quarts of ants’ eggs, six bottles of cod-liver oil, and one five-gallon tin of almonds. Only five of the birds died. Ripley, gave some of the survivors to the Bronx and Philadelphia Zoos, and sold the rest to Frank Buck and a number of dealers, at a profit of fifteen hundred dollars. His rarer skins included those of a pair of Biak owls, Otus beccarii, of which there was only one previous specimen (a male taken in 1875 in Biak by an Italian ornithologist and deposited in the Natural History Museum in Genoa), and a variety of Samoan starling of which the Philadelphia Academy had only a single specimen (a broken-billed, bedraggled one collected a hundred years earlier by Titian R. Peale, the naturalist and painter).

Ripley gave an account of the expedition in his popular book Trail of the Money Bird.
