= Book of Indian Birds =

The Book of Indian Birds by Salim Ali is a landmark book on Indian ornithology, which helped spark popular interest in the birds of India. First published in 1941, it is currently in its 13th edition. Most of the older books on Indian birds were meant for identification using specimens in the hand and the only other field guide, Hugh Whistler's Popular Handbook Of Indian Birds was published in London, was getting out of date and not readily available in India. The book of Indian birds provided a popular bird-guide in a low-cost edition.

The J. Paul Getty Award for Conservation Leadership, while awarding Salim Ali in 1976, said in its citation:

... your book, the Book of Indian Birds which in its way was the seminal natural history volume for everyone in India.

The second edition of the book was published in 1942, subsequent editions being in 1944, 1945, 1961, 1964, 1968, 1972, 1977, 1979 (11th edition with reprints in 1984, 1986, 1988, 1990 and 1992), 1996 (12th edition) and 2002 (13th edition).
