= Handbook of the Birds of India and Pakistan =

- Author: Salim Ali, S. Dillon Ripley
- Published: 1964-1974
- No. of books: 10

The Handbook of the Birds of India and Pakistan is the magnum opus of Indian ornithologist Salim Ali, written along with S. Dillon Ripley. Appended to the title is the phrase "together with those of Bangladesh, Nepal, Sikkim, Bhutan and Sri Lanka". The 10 volume work, often referred to as "the handbook", was started in 1964 and ended in 1974. A single volume "compact edition" of the book was also produced and a supplementary illustrative work A Pictorial Guide to the Birds of the Indian Subcontinent with illustrations by John Henry Dick, co-authored with Dillon Ripley, was published in 1983. The plates from this supplement were incorporated in the second edition of the "Handbook". The second edition was completed by others, notably J. S. Serrao of the BNHS, Bruce Beehler, Michel Desfayes and Pamela Rasmussen, after the deaths of Ali in 1987 and Ripley in 2001.

== Volumes ==
The following is a list of official volumes and publication dates:

1. – Divers to Hawks (1e 1968, 2e 1978)
  - Loons; Grebes; Petrels & Shearwaters; Tropicbirds; Pelicans; Boobies; Cormorants & Darter; Frigate birds; Herons, Egrets, Bitterns; Storks; Ibises & Spoonbill; Flamingos; Ducks, Geese, Swans; Hawks, Eagles, Vultures etc.
2. – Megapodes to Crab Plover (1e 1969, 2e 1980)
  - Megapodes; Pheasants, Partridges, Francolins, Quails, Peafowls etc.; Button-quails; Cranes; Rails, Crakes & Coots; Finfoots; Bustards; Jacanas; Oystercatchers; Plovers & Lapwings; Sandpipers, Snipes, Godwits, Stints etc.; Phalaropes; Snipes; Stilts, Avocets, Ibisbills; Crab plovers
3. – Stone Curlews to Owls (1e 1969, 2e 1981)
  - Stone-curlews or Thick-knees; Coursers & Pratincoles; Skuas & Jaegars; Gulls & Terns; Sandgrouses; Pigeons & Doves; Parrots; Cuckoos; Barn owls; Owls
4. – Frogmouths to Pittas (1e 1970, 2e 1983)
  - Frogmouths; Nightjars; Swifts; Trogons; Kingfishers; Bee-eaters; Rollers; Hoopoes; Hornbills; Barbets; Honeyguides; Wrynecks; Piculets; Woodpeckers; Broadbills; Pittas
5. – Larks to the Grey Hypocolius (1e 1972, 2e 1986)
  - Larks; Swallows & Martins; Shrikes; Orioles; Drongos; Wood-swallows; Mynas & Starlings; Crows, Jays, Treepies; Waxwings
6. – Cuckoo-Shrikes to Babaxes (1e 1971, 2e 1996)
  - Cuckooshrikes & Minivets; Fairy Bluebirds, Ioras, Leafbirds; Bulbuls; Babblers
7. – Laughing Thrushes to the Mangrove Whistler (1e 1972, 2e 1996)
  - Laughing thrushes, Shrike-babblers, Tit-babblers, Sibias; Flycatchers
8. – Warblers to Redstarts (1e 1973, 2e 1997)
  - Tesias; Bush-warblers; Prinias; Tailor birds; Grassbirds; Warblers; Leaf warblers; Shortwings, Thrushes, Chats & Redstarts
9. – Robins to Wagtails (1e 1973, 2e 1998)
  - Chats, Forktails, Whistling-thrushes, Thrushes; Wrens; Dippers; Accentors; Tits; Nuthatches; Creepers; Pipits & Wagtails)
10. – Flowerpeckers to Buntings (1e 1974, 2e 1999)
  - Flowerpeckers; Sunbirds; White-eyes; House & Rock Sparrows; Weaverbirds & Bayas; Avadavats & Munias; Goldfinches & Allies; Buntings
