= Salim Ali =

Indian ornithologist (1896–1987)

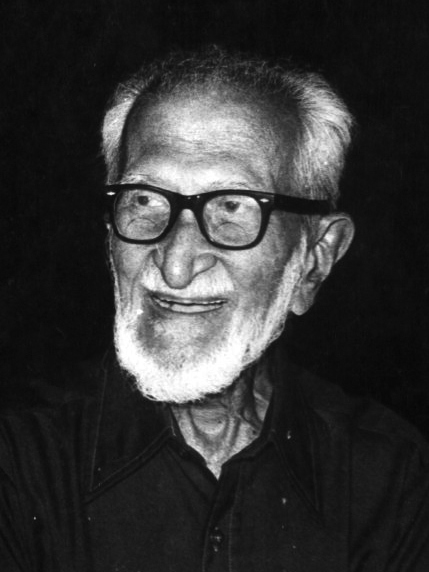
- Born: 12 November 1896; Bombay, Bombay Presidency, British India
- Died: 20 June 1987 (aged 90); Bombay, Maharashtra, India
- Known for: Bird Books; Salim Ali Lake, Aurangabad; Handbook of the Birds of India and Pakistan
- Spouse: Tehmina Ali
- Relatives: Tyabji family Abbas Tyabji (uncle)
- Awards: Padma Bhushan (1958) Padma Vibhushan (1976) J. Paul Getty Award for Conservation Leadership (1975)
- Scientific career
- Fields: Ornithology; Natural history

Sálim Moizuddin Abdul Ali (12 November 1896 – 20 June 1987) was an Indian ornithologist and naturalist. Sometimes referred to as the "Birdman of India", Salim Ali was the first Indian to conduct systematic bird surveys across India and wrote several bird books that popularised ornithology in India. He became a key figure behind the Bombay Natural History Society after 1947 and used his personal influence to garner government support for the organisation, establish the Bharatpur bird sanctuary (Keoladeo National Park) and prevent the destruction of what is now the Silent Valley National Park in Kerala.

Along with Sidney Dillon Ripley he wrote the landmark ten volume Handbook of the Birds of India and Pakistan, a second edition of which was completed after his death. He was awarded the Padma Bhushan in 1958 and the Padma Vibhushan in 1976, India's third and second highest civilian honours respectively. Salim Ali's swift and the Himalayan thrush are named after him as are Salim Ali's fruit bat and Salim Ali's dwarf gecko. Several bird sanctuaries and institutions have also been named after him.

== Early life ==
Salim Ali was born into a Sulaimani Bohra family in Bombay, the ninth and youngest child of Moizuddin Abdul Ali. His father died when he was a year old and his mother Zeenat-un-nissa died when he was three. Along with his siblings, Ali was brought up by his maternal uncle, Amiruddin Tyabji, and childless aunt, Hamida Begum, in a middle-class household in Khetwadi, Mumbai. Another uncle was Abbas Tyabji, a well known Indian freedom fighter. Ali's early interest was in books on hunting in India and he became the most interested in sport-shooting, encouraged by his foster-father Amiruddin. Shooting contests were often held in the neighbourhood in which he grew and his playmates included Iskandar Mirza, a distant cousin who was a particularly good marksman and went on in later life to become the first President of Pakistan.

Salim was introduced to the serious study of birds by W. S. Millard, secretary of the Bombay Natural History Society (BNHS) where Amiruddin was a member, who identified an unusually coloured sparrow that young Salim had shot for sport with his toy air gun. Millard identified it as a yellow-throated sparrow, and showed Salim around the Society's collection of stuffed birds. Millard lent Salim a few books including Eha's Common birds of Bombay, encouraged Salim to make a collection of birds and offered to train him in skinning and preservation. Millard later introduced young Salim to (later Sir) Norman Boyd Kinnear, the first paid curator at the BNHS, who later supported Ali from his position in the British Museum. In his autobiography, The Fall of a Sparrow, Ali notes the yellow-throated sparrow event as a turning point in his life, one that led him into ornithology, an unusual career choice, especially for an Indian in those days. Even at around 10 years of age, he maintained a diary and among his earliest bird notes were observations on the replacement of males in paired sparrows after he had shot down the male.

Salim went to primary school at Zenana Bible and Medical Mission Girls High School at Girgaum along with two of his sisters and later to St. Xavier's College, Bombay. Around the age of 13 he suffered from chronic headaches, making him drop out of class frequently. He was sent to Sind to stay with an uncle who had suggested that the dry air might help and on returning after such breaks in studies, he barely managed to pass the matriculation exam of the Bombay University in 1913.

== Burma and Germany ==
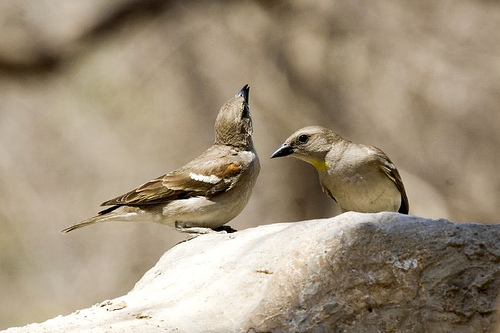
Yellow-throated sparrow

Salim Ali's early education was at St. Xavier's College, Mumbai. Following a difficult first year in college, he dropped out and went to Tavoy, Burma (now Dawei, Myanmar) to look after the family's mining and timber interests there. The forests surrounding this area provided an opportunity for Ali to hone his naturalist and hunting skills. He also made acquaintance with J C Hopwood and Berthold Ribbentrop who were with the Forest Service in Burma. On his return to India in 1917, he decided to continue formal studies. He went to study commercial law and accountancy at Davar's College of Commerce but his true interest was noticed by Father Ethelbert Blatter at St. Xavier's College who persuaded Ali to study zoology. After attending morning classes at Davar's College, he then began to attend zoology classes at St. Xavier's College and was able to complete the course in zoology. Around the same time, he married Tehmina, a distant relative, in December 1918.

Ali was fascinated by motorcycles from an early age and starting with a 3.5 HP NSU in Tavoy, he owned a Sunbeam, Harley-Davidsons (three models), a Douglas, a Scott, a New Hudson and a Zenith among others at various times, although he regretted never having owned a BMW. On invitation to the 1950 International Ornithological Congress at Uppsala in Sweden he shipped his Sunbeam aboard the SS Stratheden from Bombay and biked around Europe, injuring himself in an accident in France and having several falls on cobbled roads in Germany.

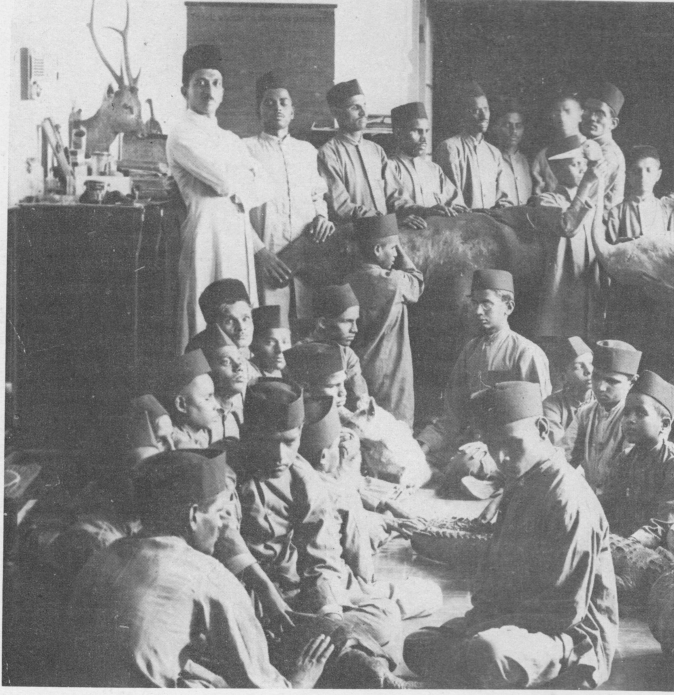
Ali (standing at left) with students of the Victoria Jubilee School for the Blind at the Prince of Wales Museum in 1927

Ali failed to get an ornithologist's position which was open at the Zoological Survey of India due to the lack of a formal university degree and the post went instead to M. L. Roonwal. He was hired as guide lecturer in 1926 at the newly opened natural history section in the Prince of Wales Museum in Mumbai with a salary of Rs 350 per month. He however tired of the job after two years and took leave in 1928 to study in Germany, where he was to work under Professor Erwin Stresemann at the Berlin's Natural History Museum. Part of the work involved studying the specimens collected by J. K. Stanford in Burma. Stanford being a BNHS member had communicated with Claud Ticehurst and had suggested that he could work on his own with assistance from the BNHS. Ticehurst did not appreciate the idea of an Indian being involved in the work and resented even more, the involvement of Stresemann, a German. Ticehurst wrote letters to the BNHS suggesting that the idea of collaborating with Stresemann was an insult to Stanford. This was however not heeded by Reginald Spence and Prater who encouraged Ali to conduct the studies at Berlin with the assistance of Stresemann. Ali found Stresemann warm and helpful right from his first letters sent before even meeting him. In his autobiography, Ali calls Stresemann his guru, to whom all his later queries went. In Berlin, Ali made acquaintance with many of the major German ornithologists of the time including Bernhard Rensch, Oskar Heinroth, Rudolf Drost and Ernst Mayr apart from meeting other Indians in Berlin including the revolutionary Chempakaraman Pillai. Ali also gained experience in bird ringing at the Heligoland Bird Observatory and in 1959 he received the assistance of Swiss ornithologist Alfred Schifferli in India.

== Ornithology ==
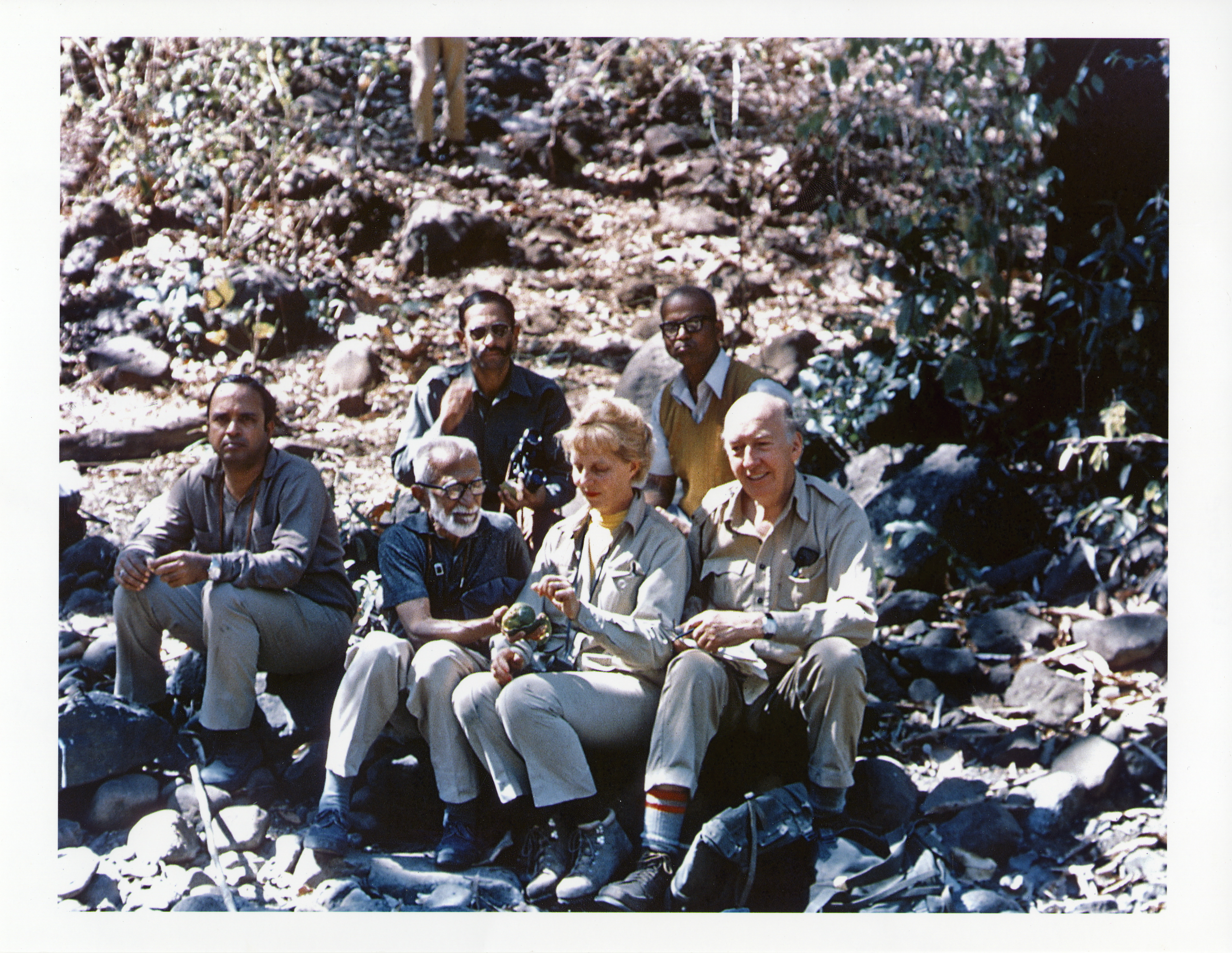
With Mary and Dillon Ripley on a collection trip (1976)

On his return to India in 1930, he discovered that the guide lecturer position had been eliminated due to lack of funds. Unable to find a suitable job, Salim Ali and Tehmina moved to Kihim, a coastal village near Mumbai. Here he had the opportunity to study at close hand, the breeding of the baya weaver and discovered their mating system of sequential polygamy. Later commentators have suggested that this study was in the tradition of the Mughal naturalists that Salim Ali admired and wrote about in three-part series on the Moghul emperors as naturalists. A few months were then spent in Kotagiri where he had been invited by K.M. Anantan, a retired army doctor who had served in Mesopotamia during World War I. He also came in contact with Mrs Kinloch, widow of BNHS member Angus Kinloch who lived at Donnington near Longwood Shola, and later her son-in-law R C Morris, who lived in the Biligirirangan Hills. Around the same time he discovered an opportunity to conduct systematic bird surveys in the princely states of Hyderabad, Cochin, Travancore, Gwalior, Indore and Bhopal with the sponsorship of their rulers. He was aided and supported in these surveys by Hugh Whistler who had surveyed many parts of India and had kept very careful notes. Whistler published a note on The study of Indian birds in 1929 where he mentioned that the racquets at the end of the long tail feathers of the greater racket-tailed drongo lacked webbing on the inner vane. Salim Ali wrote a response pointing out that this was in error and that such inaccuracies had been carried on from early literature and pointed out that it was incorrect observation that did not take into account a twist in the rachis. Whistler was initially resentful of an unknown Indian finding fault and wrote "snooty" letters to the editors of the journal S H Prater and Sir Reginald Spence. Subsequently, Whistler re-examined his specimens and not only admitted his error but became a close friend. Whistler wrote to Ali on 24 October 1938:

It has been a very great benefit to me that we drifted into collaboration largely in its beginning as an accident-when you pointed out my mistake over the webs of Drongo's tail feather-and the mistake has proved to me well worth while. And here and now I must thank you very warmly for making my collaboration a condition of your undertaking the Mysore and Sunderbans surveys.

Whistler also introduced Salim to Richard Meinertzhagen and the two made an expedition into Afghanistan. Although Meinertzhagen had very critical views of him they became good friends. Salim Ali found nothing amiss in Meinertzhagen's bird works but later studies have shown many of his studies to be fraudulent. Meinertzhagen made his diary entries from their days in the field available and Salim Ali reproduces them in his autobiography:

30.4.1937 I am disappointed in Salim. He is quite useless at anything but collecting. He cannot skin a bird, nor cook, nor do anything connected with camp life, packing up or chopping wood. He writes interminable notes about something-perhaps me... Even collecting he never does on his own initiative...

20.5.1937 Salim is the personification of the educated Indian and interests me a great deal. He is excellent at his own theoretical subjects, but has no practical ability, and at everyday little problems is hopelessly inefficient... His views are astounding. He is prepared to turn the British out of India tomorrow and govern the country himself. I have repeatedly told him that the British Government have no intention of handing over millions of uneducated Indians to the mercy of such men as Salim:...

He was accompanied and supported on his early surveys by his wife, Tehmina, and was shattered when she died in 1939 following a minor surgery. After Tehmina's death in 1939, Salim Ali stayed with his sister Kamoo and brother-in-law. In the course of his later travels, Ali rediscovered the Kumaon Terai population of the Finn's baya but was unsuccessful in his expedition to find the mountain quail (Ophrysia superciliosa), the status of which continues to remain unknown.

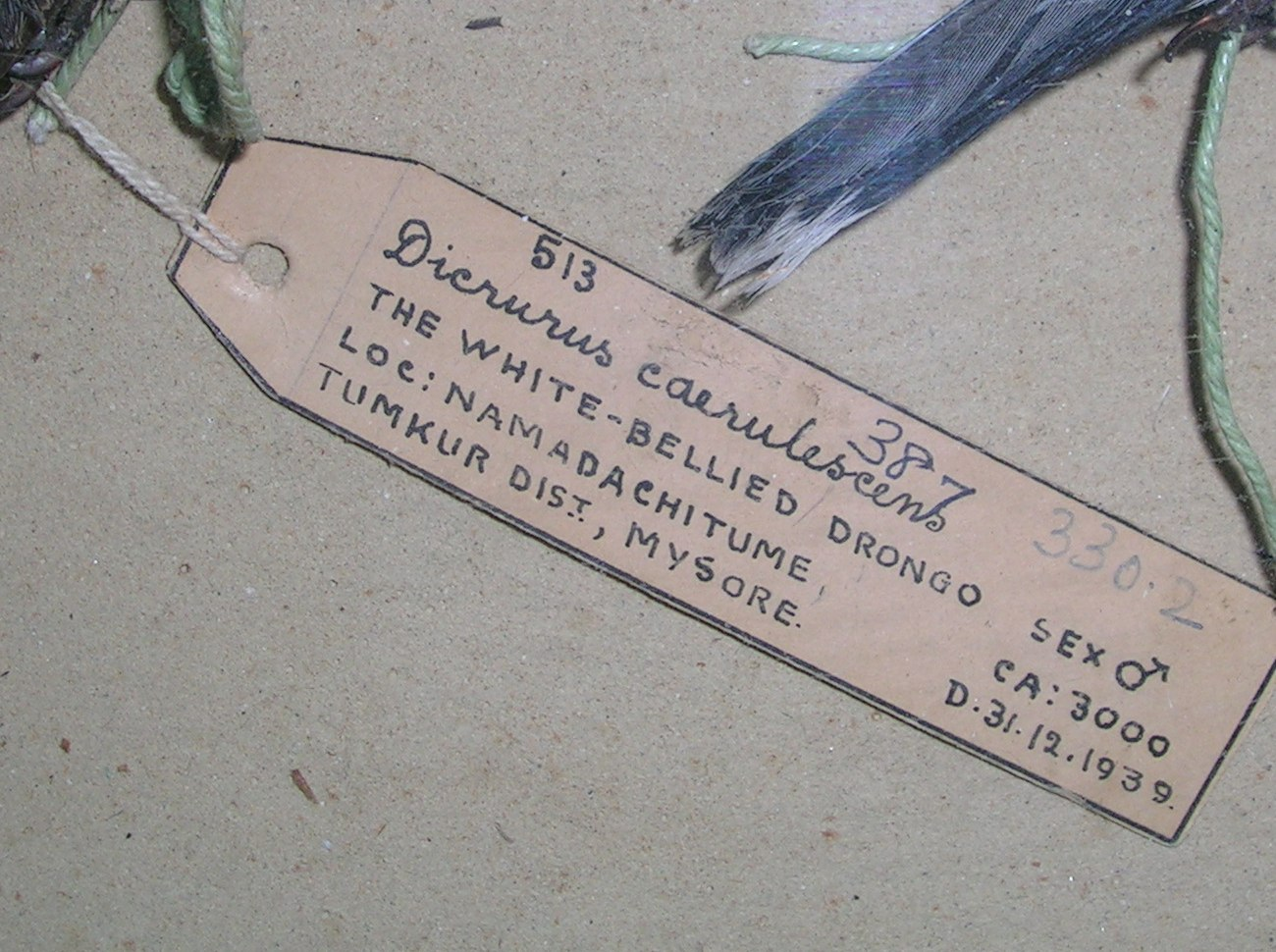
Label for a specimen collected by Salim Ali during his Mysore State survey

Ali was not very interested in the details of bird systematics and taxonomy and was more interested in studying birds in the field. Ernst Mayr wrote to Ripley complaining that Ali failed to collect sufficient specimens: "as far as collecting is concerned I don't think he ever understood the necessity for collecting series. Maybe you can convince him of that." Ali himself wrote to Ripley complaining about bird taxonomy:

My head reels at all these nomenclatural metaphysics! I feel strongly like retiring from ornithology, if this is the stuff, and spending the rest of my days in the peace of the wilderness with birds, and away from the dust and frenzy of taxonomical warfare. I somehow feel complete detachment from all this, and am thoroughly unmoved by what name one ornithologist chooses to dub a bird that is familiar to me, and care even less in regard to one that is unfamiliar ----- The more I see of these subspecific tangles and inanities, the more I can understand the people who silently raise their eyebrows and put a finger to their temples when they contemplate the modern ornithologist in action.

— Ali to Ripley, 5 January 1956

Ali later wrote that his interest was in the "living bird in its natural environment."

Salim Ali's associations with Sidney Dillon Ripley led to many bureaucratic problems. Ripley's past as an OSS agent led to allegations that the CIA had a hand in the bird-ringing operations in India.

Salim Ali took some interest in bird photography along with his friend Loke Wan Tho. Loke had been introduced to Ali by J.T.M. Gibson, a BNHS member and Lieutenant Commander of the Royal Indian Navy, who had taught English to Loke at a school in Switzerland. A wealthy Singapore businessman with a keen interest in birds, Loke helped Ali and the BNHS with financial support. Ali was also interested in the historical aspects of ornithology in India. In a series of articles, among his first publications, he examined the contributions to natural-history of the Mughal emperors. In the 1971 Sunder Lal Hora memorial lecture and the 1978 Azad Memorial Lecture he spoke of the history and importance of bird study in India. Towards the end of his life, he began to document the lives of people in the history of the Bombay Natural History Society but did not complete the series with only four parts published.

== Other contributions ==
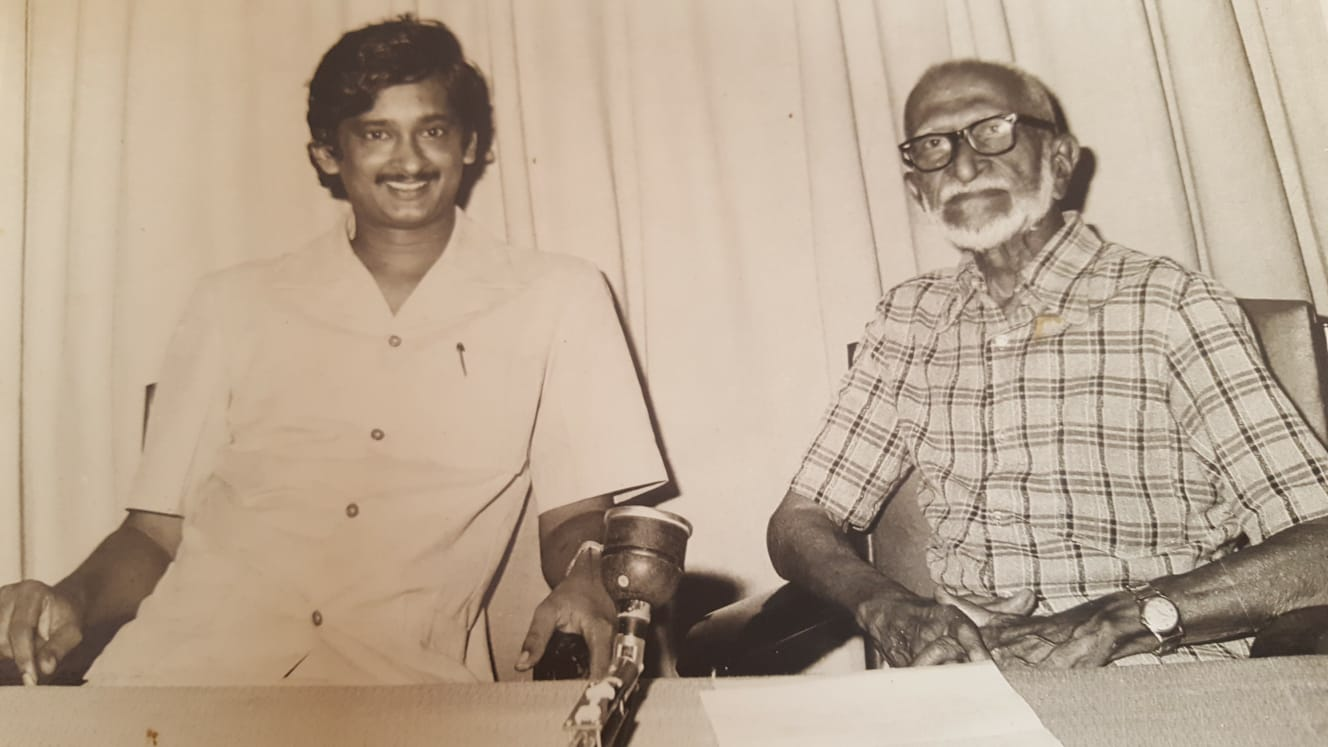
Ali with K. S. R. Krishna Raju, 1975

Salim Ali was very influential in ensuring the survival of the BNHS and managed to save the then 100-year-old institution by writing to the then Prime Minister Pandit Nehru for financial help. Salim also influenced other members of his family. A cousin, Humayun Abdulali became an ornithologist while his niece Laeeq took an interest in birds and was married to Zafar Futehally, a distant cousin of Ali, who went on to become the honorary Secretary of the BNHS and played a major role in the development of bird study through the networking of birdwatchers in India. A grand-nephew Shahid Ali also took an interest in ornithology. Ali also guided several MSc and PhD students, the first of whom was Vijaykumar Ambedkar, who further studied the breeding and ecology of the baya weaver, producing a thesis that was favourably reviewed by David Lack.

Ali was able to provide support for the development of ornithology in India by identifying important areas where funding could be obtained. He helped in the establishment of an economic ornithology unit within the Indian Council for Agricultural Research in the mid-1960s although he failed to gain support for a similar proposal in 1935. He was also able to obtain funding for migration studies through a project to study the Kyasanur forest disease, an arthropod-borne virus that appeared to have similarities to a Siberian tick-borne disease. This project partly funded by the PL 480 grants of the USA however ran into political difficulties with allegations made on CIA involvement. The funding for the early bird migration studies actually came for the early studies from the US Army Medical Research Laboratory in Bangkok under the SEATO (South Atlantic Security Pact) and headed by H. Elliott McClure. An Indian science reporter wrote in a local newspaper that the collaboration was secretly exploring the use of migratory birds for spreading deadly viruses and microbes into enemy territories. India was then a non-aligned country and the news led to political upheaval and a committee was set up to examine the research and allegations. Once cleared of these allegations, the project however stopped routing the funds through Bangkok to avoid further suspicions and was directly funded by the Americans to India. In the late 1980s, Ali also headed a BNHS project to reduce bird hits at Indian airfields. He also attempted a citizen science project to study house sparrows in 1963 through Indian birdwatchers subscribed to the Newsletter for Birdwatchers.

Ali had considerable influence in conservation related issues in post-independence India especially through Prime Ministers Jawaharlal Nehru and Indira Gandhi. Indira Gandhi, herself a keen birdwatcher, was influenced by Ali's bird books (a copy of the Book of Indian Birds was gifted to her in 1942 by her father Nehru who was in Dehra Dun jail while she herself was imprisoned in Naini Jail) and by the Gandhian birdwatcher Horace Alexander. Ali influenced the designation of the Bharatpur Bird Sanctuary, the Ranganathittu Bird Sanctuary and in decisions that saved the Silent Valley National Park. One of Ali's later interventions at Bharatpur involved the exclusion of cattle and graziers from the sanctuary and this was to prove costly as it resulted in ecological changes that led to a decline in the waterbirds. Some historians have noted that the approach to conservation used by Salim Ali and the BNHS followed an undemocratic process.

Ali lived for some time with his brother Hamid Ali (1880–1965) who had retired in 1934 from the Indian Civil Service and settled at Southwood, ancestral home of his father in law, Abbas Tyabji, in Mussoorie. During this period Ali became a close friend of Arthur Foot, principal of The Doon School and his wife Sylvia (referred to jocularly by Ali as the "Feet"). He visited the school often and was an engaging and persuasive advocate of ornithology to successive generations of pupils. As a consequence, he was considered to be part of the Dosco fraternity and became one of the very few people to be made an honorary member of The Doon School Old Boys Society.

== Personal views ==
Salim Ali held many views that were contrary to the mainstream ideas of his time. A question he was asked frequently in later life was on the contradiction between the collection of bird specimens and his conservation related activism. Although once a fan of shikar (hunting) literature, Ali held strong views against sport hunting but upheld the collection of bird specimens for scientific study. He held the view that the practice of wildlife conservation needed to be practical and not grounded in philosophies like ahimsa. Salim Ali suggested that this fundamental religious sentiment had hindered the growth of bird study in India.

...it is true that I despise purposeless killing, and regard it as an act of vandalism, deserving the severest condemnation. But my love for birds is not of the sentimental variety. It is essentially aesthetic and scientific, and in some cases may even be pragmatic. For a scientific approach to bird study, it is often necessary to sacrifice a few, ... (and) I have no doubt that but for the methodical collecting of specimens in my earlier years – several thousands, alas – it would have been impossible to advance our taxonomical knowledge of Indian birds ... nor indeed of their geographic distribution, ecology, and bionomics.

— Ali (1985):195

In the early 1960s, the national bird of India was under consideration and Salim Ali was intent that it should be the endangered Great Indian bustard, however this proposal was over-ruled in favour of the Indian peacock.

Ali was known for his frugal lifestyle, with money saved at the end of many of his projects. Shoddy jobs by people around him could make him very angry. He discouraged smoking and drinking and detested people who snored in their sleep.

== Honours and memorials ==
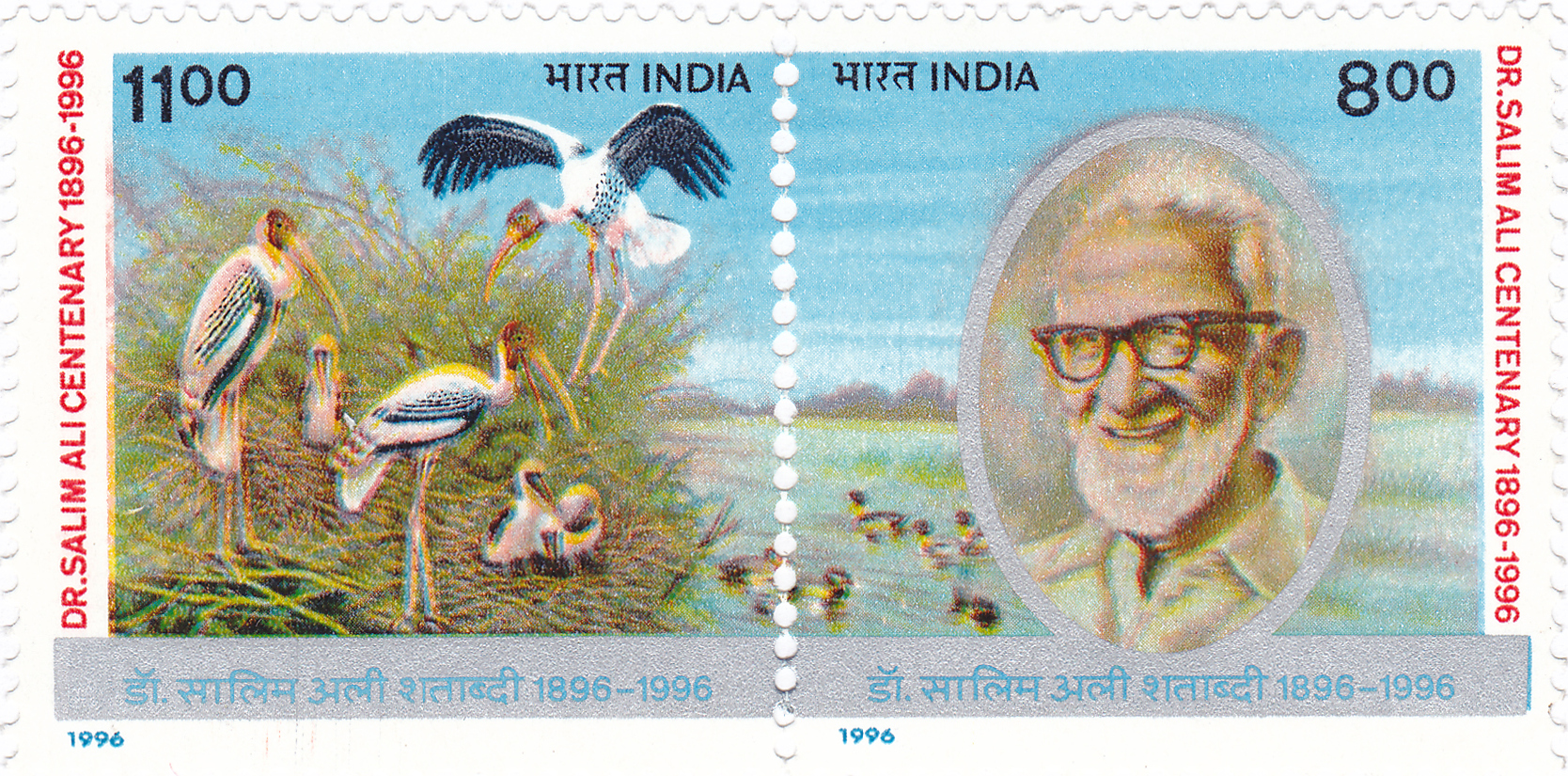
Birth centenary commemorative stamps showing painted storks in Bharatpur and Salim Ali (1996)

Although recognition came late, he received several honorary doctorates and numerous awards. The earliest was the "Joy Gobinda Law Gold Medal" in 1953, awarded by the Asiatic Society of Bengal based on an appraisal of his work by Sunder Lal Hora (and in 1970 he received the Sunder Lal Hora memorial Medal of the Indian National Science Academy). He received honorary doctorates from the Aligarh Muslim University (1958), Delhi University (1973) and Andhra University (1978). In 1967 he became the first non-British citizen to receive the Gold Medal of the British Ornithologists' Union. In the same year, he received the J. Paul Getty Wildlife Conservation Prize consisting of a sum of $100,000, which he used as a corpus for the Salim Ali Nature Conservation Fund. In 1969 he received the John C. Phillips memorial medal of the International Union for Conservation of Nature and Natural Resources. The USSR Academy of Medical Sciences awarded him the Pavlovsky Centenary Memorial Medal in 1973 and in the same year he was made Commander of the Netherlands Order of the Golden Ark by Prince Bernhard of the Netherlands. The Indian government decorated him with a Padma Bhushan in 1958 and the Padma Vibhushan in 1976. He was nominated to the Rajya Sabha in 1985.

Citation of the Paul Getty Prize

The International Jury for the
J. Paul Getty Wildlife Conservation Prize
of the World Wildlife Fund has selected for 1975
Salim A. Ali
Creator of an environment for conservation in India,
your work over fifty years in acquainting Indians
with the natural riches of the subcontinent
has been instrumental in the promotion of protection,
the setting up of parks and reserves,
and indeed the awakening of conscience in all circles
from the government to the simplest village Panchayat.
Since the writing of your book, the Book of Indian Birds
which in its way was the seminal natural history volume
for everyone in India, your name has been the single one
known throughout the length and breadth of your own country,
Pakistan, and Bangladesh as the father of conservation
and the fount of knowledge on birds.
Your message has gone high and low across the land
and we are sure that weaver birds weave your initials
in their nests, and swifts perform parabolas in the sky in your honor.

For your lifelong dedication to the preservation
of bird life in the Indian subcontinent and your identification
with the Bombay Natural History Society as a force for education,
the World Wildlife Fund takes delight in presenting you with
the second J. Paul Getty Wildlife Conservation Prize.
February 19, 1976.

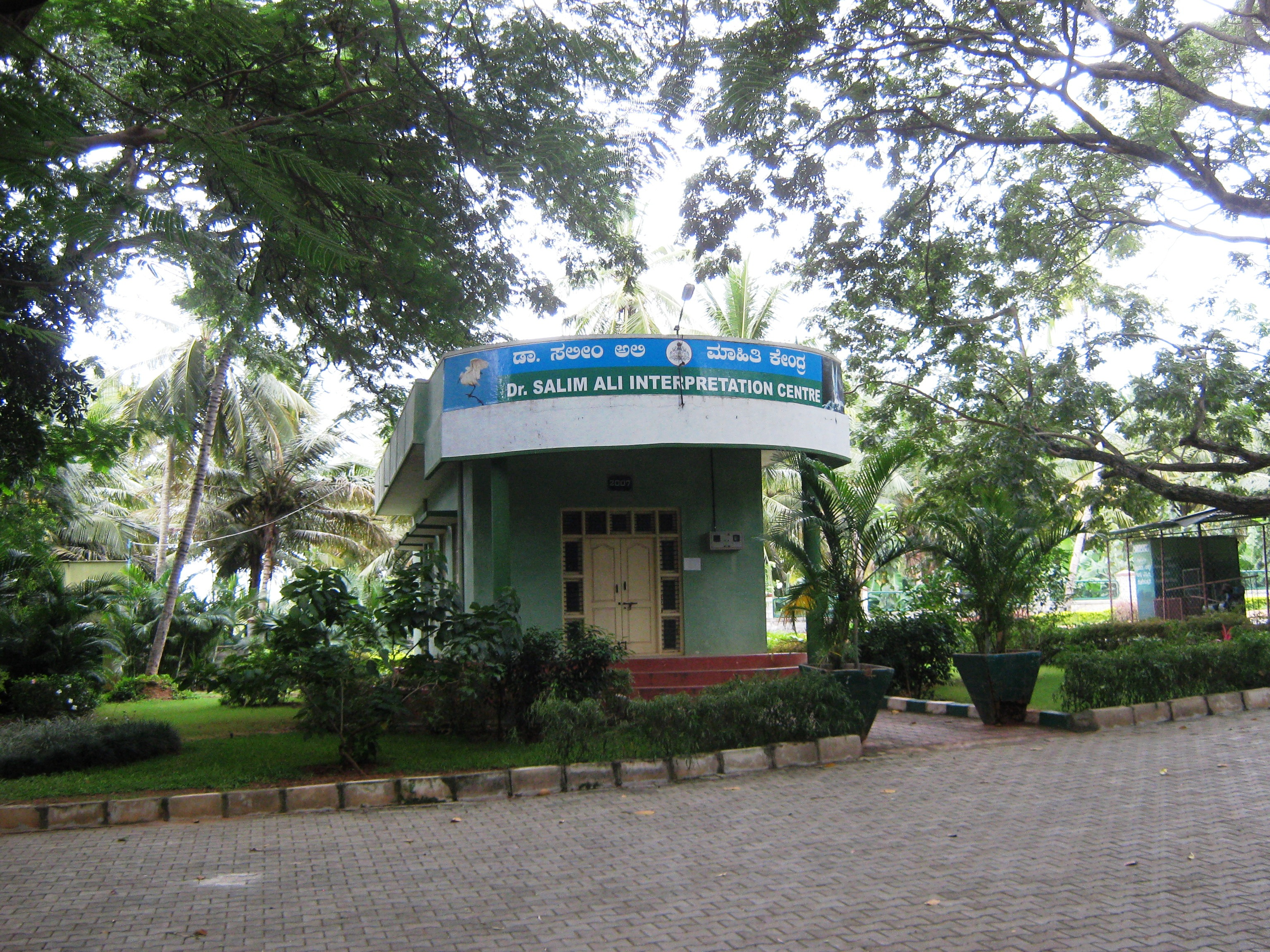
An interpretation centre at Ranganathittu Bird Sanctuary named after Salim Ali

Dr. Salim Ali died in Bombay at the age of 90 on 20 June 1987, after a protracted battle with prostate cancer. In 1990, the Sálim Ali Centre for Ornithology and Natural History (SACON) was established at Coimbatore by the Government of India. Pondicherry University established the Salim Ali School of Ecology and Environmental Sciences. The government of Goa set up the Salim Ali Bird Sanctuary and the Thattakad bird sanctuary near Vembanad in Kerala also goes by his name. The location of the BNHS headquarters in Mumbai was renamed as "Dr Salim Ali Chowk". In 1972, Kitti Thonglongya discovered a misidentified specimen in the collection of the BNHS and described a new species that he called Latidens salimalii, considered one of the world's rarest bats, and the only species in the genus Latidens. The subspecies of the rock bush quail (Perdicula argoondah salimalii) and the subspecies of Indian white-eye (Zosterops palpebrosus salimalii) were named after him by Whistler and the eastern population of Finn's weaver (Ploceus megarhynchus salimalii) was named after him by Abdulali. A subspecies of the black-rumped flameback woodpecker (Dinopium benghalense tehminae) was named after his wife, Tehmina, by Whistler and Kinnear. Salim Ali's swift (Apus salimalii) originally described as a population of Apus pacificus was recognised as a full species in 2011 while Zoothera salimalii, an undescribed population within the Zoothera mollissima complex, was named after him in 2016. On his 100th birth Anniversary (12 November 1996) Postal Department of Government of India released a set of two postal stamps.

== Writings ==
Salim Ali wrote numerous journal articles, chiefly in the Journal of the Bombay Natural History Society. He also wrote a number of popular and academic books, many of which remain in print. Ali credited Tehmina, who had studied in England, for helping improve his English prose. Some of his literary pieces were used in a collection of English writing. A popular article that he wrote in 1930, "Stopping by the woods on a Sunday morning", was reprinted in The Indian Express on his birthday in 1984. His most popular work was The Book of Indian Birds, written in the style of Whistler's Popular Handbook of Birds, first published in 1941 and subsequently translated into several languages with numerous later editions. The first ten editions sold more than forty-six thousand copies. The first edition was reviewed by Ernst Mayr in 1943, who commended it while noting that the illustrations were not to the standard of American bird-books. His magnum opus was however the 10 volume Handbook of the Birds of India and Pakistan written with Dillon Ripley and often referred to as "the handbook". This work began in 1964 and ended in 1974 with a second edition completed after his death by others, notably J. S. Serrao of the BNHS, Bruce Beehler, Michel Desfayes and Pamela Rasmussen. A single volume compact edition of the Handbook was also produced and a supplementary illustrative work, the first to cover all the birds of India, A Pictorial Guide to the Birds of the Indian Subcontinent, by John Henry Dick and Dillon Ripley was published in 1983. The plates from this work were incorporated in the second edition of the Handbook. He also produced a number of regional field guides, including The Birds of Kerala (the first edition in 1953 was titled The Birds of Travancore and Cochin), The Birds of Sikkim, The Birds of Kutch (later as The Birds of Gujarat), Indian Hill Birds and Birds of the Eastern Himalayas. Several low-cost book were produced by the National Book Trust including Common Birds (1967) coauthored with his niece Laeeq Futehally which was reprinted in several editions with translations into Hindi and other languages. In 1985 he wrote his autobiography The Fall of a Sparrow. Ali provided his own vision for the Bombay Natural History Society, noting the importance of conservation action. In the 1986 issue of the Journal of the BNHS he noted the role that the BNHS had played, the changing interests from hunting to conservation captured in 64 volumes that were preserved in microfiche copies, and the zenith that he claimed it had reached under the exceptional editorship of S H Prater.

A two-volume compilation of his shorter letters and writings was published in 2006, edited by Tara Gandhi, one of his last students. She also edited a collection of transcripts of radio talks given by Salim Ali, which was published in 2021.
