= Barnes School =

Boarding school in west India

Coordinates: 19°53′24.28″N 73°48′31.62″E

Barnes School, Deolali, is a boarding school in west India. It was established in 1925, on the basis of a 1718 original foundation. It is a private co-educational prep school. It is an Anglican school, founded in 1925, under the auspices of the Bombay Education Society. The school is twinned with Christ Church School, in Mumbai. Both schools follow the ICSE curriculum and use the same shield as a badge or logo, Barnes in blue and Christ Church in green. Barnes Junior College is affiliated to the Indian School Certificate/ISC. Barnes School and Junior College was started in 2008.

== History ==
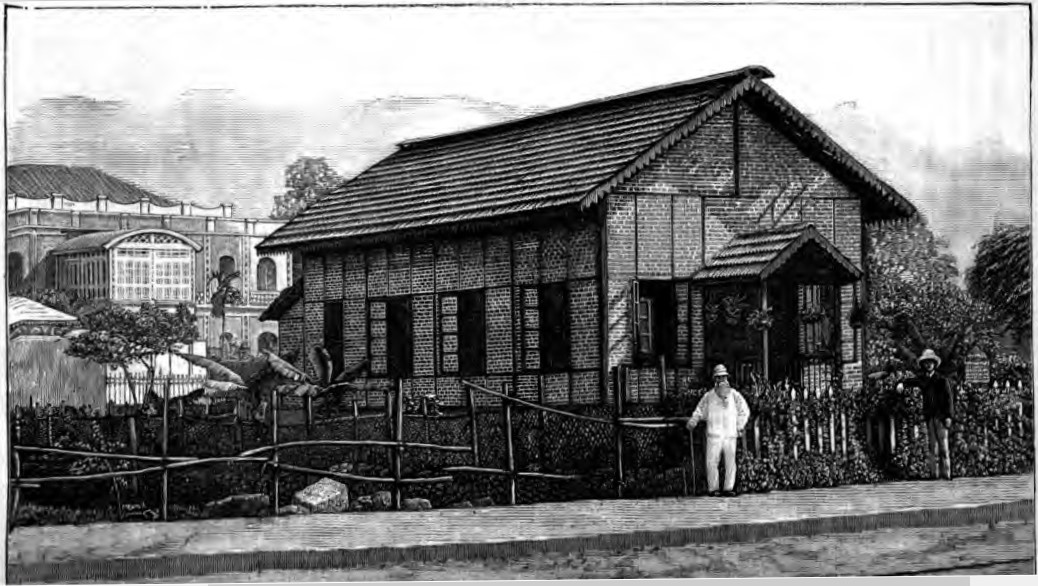
A Sketch of the Mission at Bombay (Clutterbuck, p.198)

When the Revd. Richard Cobbe was appointed chaplain to the British East India Company factory at Bombay in colonial India, he founded, in 1718, a small free school where twelve poor boys were housed, clothed, fed and educated by one master. The school was in a building not far from the present Cathedral of St. Thomas in Fort. That charity school was the seed from which Barnes has sprung.

A hundred years passed by. Another East India Company chaplain, the Ven. Archdeacon George Barnes, realised that the charity school could not meet the needs of hundreds of children then without any education. So he appealed for funds and started the Bombay Education Society in 1815, the oldest society in the city interested in the welfare and upbringing of children. The first, small, school was taken over. Numbers grew until it was apparent that new grounds and school buildings were essential.

A large airy site at Byculla was given by the Government. Girls were also provided for. New school buildings were opened in 1825. One of the copper plates commemorating the opening is now on the wall of Evans Hall, Devlali. The other remains with Christ Church School, Byculla, which with the parish church there stands on part of the land given originally to the BES. Much of the land was later sold to help build Barnes.

The BES schools were primarily boarding schools for Anglo-Indian boys and girls, mainly belonging to the Anglican Church. However, day-scholars were admitted and they were of all castes and creeds. In the early 20th century the BES amalgamated with the Indo-British Institution, which had been founded about 1837 by the Revd. George Candy. Byculla was by then crowded and unhealthy. Plans, initiated by Sir Reginald Spence and Mr Haig-Brown, to move the boarding part of the schools away from Mumbai to the cooler and healthier Deccan Plateau began to take shape. A site of more than 250 acres (1.0 km^{2}) at Deolali was purchased.

On 17 November 1923 Sir George Lloyd laid the foundation stone of Evans Hall. Less than two years later, on 29 January 1925, a special train brought the first boarders to Devlali and Barnes was declared open by Sir Leslie Wilson, Governor of Bombay and patron of the Bombay Education Society.

It is still primarily a place where the poor Anglo-Indian children of the Anglican and other Protestant Churches can be given education. It is still a Church school where Christian ideals are practised and imparted.

The memory of founders and benefactors is preserved in the names of the buildings: Barnes, Candy, Spence, Haig-Brown, Lloyd. Other names are remembered. Greaves House is named after Sir John Greaves, a prominent Bombay businessman of the firm of Greaves Cotton, director of the Bombay Education Society from 1930 and Chairman of its Managing Committee from 1939 to 1949. Royal House commemorates Harry Royal, an old boy of the BES School from the years around 1900 to 1910, who became an officer of the Bombay Chamber of Commerce and honorary treasurer of the BES for many years. The greatest of them all was the Revd. Thomas Evans. After being Headmaster at the old school at Byculla since 1910, he became the first Headmaster of Barnes, without whom it would probably not have survived its early years. His portrait hangs in Evans Hall which was named in memory of him when he retired in 1934.

== Sports and extra-curricular activities ==
Sports include football, cross country running, athletics, gymnastics, swimming, hockey, tennis, boxing, badminton, table tennis, basketball, and volleyball. Extra-curricular activities include debating, SUPW, singing, and elocution competitions.

Barnes has won the "All Maharashtra Anglo-Indian Schools Football Tournament" 11 out of the 18 times, including a record of 7 times in a row. Barnes has a campus of 265 acres (1.07 km^{2}), has seven playing fields and an expanse of plains and forests surrounding it.

== Second World War ==
W. R. Coles, Principal from 1934 to 1968, wrote of Barnes during the war years:

Those were the days of Hitler and the Nazis in Germany. Storm clouds of war were gathering thick and fast. In India the struggle for independence grew fiercer year by year. At first it seemed the war would pass by Devlali but it was not long before changes came. Overnight, part of our school compound was requisitioned and all the land to the west where we used to have our cross-country runs, around Surprise Hill [a hill to the west of Barnes] was put out of bounds to form part of the new School of Artillery with its ranges stretching to Square Top [further west] and beyond. From a small peacetime garrison of two or three hundred, Devlali and the surrounding area eventually became an enormous Transit Camp holding at its maximum 70,000 men. They came from Australia and New Zealand only to be quickly on their way again to the deserts of North Africa. Regiments came from England to go always further east to Burma or Malaya.

Amongst these men and elsewhere Barnes was well represented as more and more old students joined the armed forces – mainly the Army, though also the Air Force and the Navy. Old girls became nurses or joined as 'WACs' (Women's Auxiliary Corps). Younger men on the staff went off to enlist. Gradually it became more and more difficult to find teachers. Retired men and, in some cases, misfits had to be engaged. At times classes had to be combined since no teachers at all were available. The Military Hospital expanded fivefold to deal with the mounting toll of wounded men sent back from the fighting areas. At the end of 1941 and the beginning of 1942 war came close to India with the capture of Burma by the Japanese. Of the civilians from Rangoon and other Burmese towns who managed to escape by air or ship or by trekking over the mountains, some came to Barnes – children and adults. Three teachers and some matrons joined us in this way. At one time it seemed there was nothing to stop the Japanese coming into Assam, Bengal or even further. For a period they had command of the sea. It was considered possible that planes from an aircraft carrier might bomb Bombay and Devlali. So at Barnes we set to dig trenches, erect blast walls, learn First Aid and undergo training in ARP (Air Raid Precautions). At any hour of the day or night the Headmaster could be seen, and heard, cycling around the compound, blowing on a whistle. At the first shrill blast everything had to be stopped, even a meal, and off all had to troop to their Air Raid Stations. Thank goodness, this phase did not last long.

Every effort was made to entertain the troops. We had some wonderful cricket matches against teams including top club players from Australia, and football games with teams including one or two professionals from the English Leagues. Individual soldiers were invited to our homes. Professional artistes from the stage and screen, organised by a Government agency, ENSA, were sent around the big troop centres. In Devlali, at first all the entertainments were held in Evans Hall. Variety shows, orchestras, plays of every kind, Barnes saw in those days.

What is now the School of Artillery Children's School, near the Cathay Cinema, was built as the Lumley Canteen. One night a week till the canteen finally closed down at the end of 1947 a team of the staff of Barnes used to run it, first preparing food, and then serving it. Feeding the boarders during the war was not easy. We used to get our milk from the Military Farm but at just a week's notice we had to make our own arrangements. Potatoes which in pre-war times came from Italy or East Africa were often nonexistent. If it was not wheat, it was rice, or sugar or something else which could not be had for love or money. Luckily it never happened that there was a shortage of everything at the same time.

Our class-work suffered inevitably from lack of proper staff and also from the booming of guns practising on the ranges throughout the day and night. The Cambridge School Certificate examining body let up a little on their normal standards. Our children had to write their answers in pencil with carbon copies so that if the ship carrying one set of answers was sunk, there was the second set which might get through in safety. One year the question papers did not arrive in time. Unluckily for the candidates who hoped to be excused from taking the examination, fresh single papers were flown over and the printing was done in India. Destruction and death touched Barnes. The disastrous dock fire and explosion in Bombay brought orphans to the school. Their fathers had been killed while on duty with the Fire Brigade. In 1944 tragedy struck the school itself. Three boys were killed by the explosion of a mortar shell which had been found just outside the boundary and which they were investigating at the rear of Candy Block. Despite distractions and disasters life went on.

== Past principals ==
- Rev. T. Evans (1925 – 1934)
- Mr. W. Coles (1934 – 1968)
- Mr. J. Davis (1968 – 1985)
- Mr. A. A Baker (1986 – 2000)
- Mr. A. Temple (2001 – 2006)
- Dr. L. C. Coutinho (2006 – 2009)
- Mr. B. Martin (2009 – 2011)
- Mr. J. Luke (2011–2018)
- Mr. Ainsley Edgar (2018–2023)

== School coat of arms ==
The following description of the school arms has been received from the College of Arms, London:

It is a combination of the arms of Archdeacon Barnes, the Founder, on the left side, and that of his wife, who belonged to the Carnac family, on the right. On the left side is a blue shield with the faces of three white leopards and on the right, four-quarters alternately white and blue with crossed swords, three five-pointed stars and a crescent. The swords are in their natural steel colour with the points upward. The stars are blue over the white quarters and white over the blue. Similarly the crescent is white and blue. The bird is a white falcon with golden beak and legs. It is standing on a green mount with six alternate twists of white and blue underneath. The motto, in Latin, Accepto robore susgam can be translated, "I shall arise with the strength I have received."

== School houses ==
=== Boys ===
The boys houses are named after school founders/benefactors:

- Candy – Green – Revd. George Candy
- Greaves – Blue – Sir John Greaves
- Royal – Red – Harry Royal
- Spence – Yellow – Sir Reginald Spence

=== Girls ===
The girls houses are named after women of historical significance:

- Joan of Arc – Green
- Edith Cavell – Red
- Helen Keller – Blue
- Florence Nightingale – Yellow

== Notable alumni ==
- Vinod Khanna
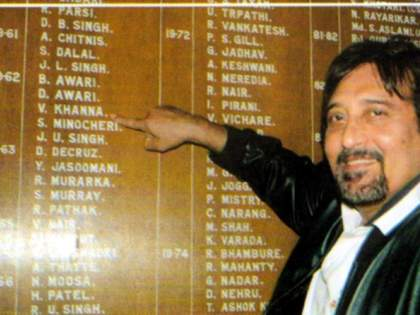
  Vinod Khanna alumni of Barnes School
- Dilip Kumar
- Cyrus Todiwala
- Arshad Warsi
- Anil Yashwant Tipnis
- Karambir Singh
- Shivaji Satam
- Raza Murad
