= J. Paul Getty Award for Conservation Leadership =

Annual Leadership awards

- Description: Outstanding leadership in global conservation
- Country: International
- Presented by: World Wildlife Fund (WWF)
- Reward: $200,000 (for graduate fellowships)

The J. Paul Getty Award for Conservation Leadership is an annual award recognizing outstanding leadership in global conservation. It was established by J. Paul Getty and has been administered by the World Wildlife Fund (WWF) since 2006. The award is unique because it includes a $200,000 cash prize that goes towards funding graduate fellowships in conservation-related fields. The award rotates annually between three categories: political leadership, scientific leadership, and community leadership.

Currently, the award is administered by the World Wildlife Fund on behalf of the Getty family. Conservation organizations worldwide submit nominations to the WWF and winners are selected by an impartial panel of judges from the conservation community. The Getty Award recognizes achievement in three annually rotating categories: political leadership in conservation (2006), leadership in conservation science (2007), and community leadership in conservation (2008). The 2009 Getty Award will mark the beginning of the second rotation by recognizing outstanding achievements in political conservation leadership.

== History ==
The prize was first instituted by philanthropist and businessman J. Paul Getty in 1974 as the J. Paul Getty Wildlife Conservation Prize. Initially, the prize had the broad aim to recognize "outstanding contributions to international conservation" but was renamed in 2004 to reflect a restructuring of the award to "give it greater focus and strengthen its impact on conservation."^{[1]} The newly established J. Paul Getty Award for Conservation Leadership was awarded for the first time in 2006.

In 1983 the Wildlife Conservation Prize was presented to the awardees by President Ronald Reagan at a ceremony in the White House Rose Garden. According to Russell E. Train, the president of the World Wildlife Fund in the United States at the time, Reagan referred to the Getty Award as the "Nobel Prize for conservation."

== Recipients ==
=== J. Paul Getty Award for Conservation Leadership recipients (2008-2006) ===
| Year | Name | Country | Category | Basis of award |
|---|---|---|---|---|
| 2008 | Roger Samba | Madagascar | Community Leadership in Conservation | Organized the world's first community-managed no-take zone for octopus |
| 2007 | Dr. K. Ullas Karanth | India | Leadership in Conservation Science | Developed sophisticated and accurate methods for monitoring wild animal populations and in recognition of his many other contributions to conservation |
| 2006 | His Majesty Jigme Singye Wangchuck, King of Bhutan | Bhutan | Political Leadership in Conservation | Brought about government policies that have substantially benefitted conservation and increased environmental sustainability in Bhutan |

=== J. Paul Getty Wildlife Conservation Prize recipients (2003-1974) ===
| Year | Name | Organization | Country | Basis of award |
|---|---|---|---|---|
| 2003 | Dmitry Lisitsyn | Sakhalin Environmental Watch | Russia | Worked to hold oil companies responsible for their effects on the environment of Sakhalin Island |
| 2003 | Haji Masdjuni | | East Kalimantan, Indonesia | Achievements in sea turtle protection |
| 2003 | Francisco Solis Germani | Coastal Range Coalition | Chile | Played a significant role in the rerouting of Chile's Southern Coastal highway |
| 2003 | Lester Seri | Conservation Melanesia | Papua New Guinea | Aided the native Maisin people to reduce the negative impacts of unsustainable farming techniques |
| 2003 | Yang Xin | Greenriver Environmental Protection Association | Tibet, China | Worked with the Chinese government to protect the Tibetan antelope and the Yangtze River at its source |
| 2002 | Antonio Reina | | Mozambique | Contributed to the conservation of Mozambique's coastal region, including the expansion of the Bazaruto Archipelago National Park |
| 2001 | | Charles Darwin Foundation | Ecuador | In recognition of more than 40 years of conservation work in the Galápagos Islands and for its response to the Jessica oil spill occurring this year |
| 2000 | Julia Carabias Lillo | | Mexico | Contributed greatly to the protection of Mexico's biodiversity and to the development of an international model of resource management that harmonises environmental concerns with those of people |
| 1999 | | | Trinational NGO Alliance for the Gulf of Honduras | Contributed to the protection and conservation of coastal and marine resources of the Gulf of Honduras |
| 1999 | Pan Wenshi | | China | Broke ground in panda conservation with a career that has advanced understanding of the giant panda and laid a foundation for new conservation programmes |
| 1998 | M. Jean-Bosco Kpanou | | Central Republic of Africa | Habituated lowland gorillas in the Dzanga-Ndoki National Park |
| 1997 | | Forest Stewardship Council | Oaxaca, Mexico | For promoting environmentally sound forest management by harnessing the power of the marketplace |
| 1996 | | Fundação Pro-TAMAR | Salvador, Brazil | For turtle conservation |
| 1996 | | Pawikan Conservation Project and Taman-Taman Sabah (Sabah Parks) | Quezon City, Philippines and Sabah, Malaysia (respectively) | For safeguarding a vital nesting area for sea turtles |
| 1995 | | The Parc National des Volcans (Volcanoes National Park) | Rwanda | For park staff's dedication and heroism in protecting mountain gorillas during the Civil War |
| 1994 | | Sherubtse College | Bhutan | For developing an innovative environmental studies programme |
| 1994 | | COMUNIDEC | Ecuador | For fostering a grassroots conservation movement in Ecuador |
| 1992/ 1993 | | West Bengal Forest Protection Committees | India | For their innovative community-based approach to sustainable management of the region's forests |
| 1992/ 1993 | | CODDEFFAGOLF (El Comité para la Defensa y Desarrollo de la Flora y Fauna del Golfo de Fonseca) | Honduras | For raising awareness of threats to marine and coastal resources and promoting stricter environmental law enforcement |
| 1991 | | Fundacion Peruana para la Conservacion de la Naturaleza | Peru | For conservation achievements in Manú National Park and Biosphere Reserve |
| 1991 | | Ghandruk Forest Management Committee, Annapurna Conservation Area Project | Nepal | For its involvement of local residents in the protection of their natural resources |
| 1990 | Dr. Emil Salim | | Indonesia | Led incorporation of environmental assessments into Indonesian law as the Minister of State for Population and the Environment |
| 1989 | Professor Miguel Alvarez del Toro | | Chiapas, Mexico | Helped establish 11 reserves, fought to preserve Mexico's wildlife, and authored books and technical publications on Chiapas |
| 1988 | Dr. Perez Olindo | | Kenya | Made significant contributions to preserving Kenya's natural resources and played a leading role in the Convention on International Trade in Endangered Species (CITES) African Elephant Working Group |
| 1987 | Dr. Hemanta Mishra | | Nepal | Broke ground with his biotic studies on Mt. Everest and in recognition of his development of Nepal's park systems, work on implementing Operation Tiger |
| 1986 | Sir Peter Scott | | Great Britain | Co-founded the World Wildlife Fund in 1961 and made lifelong contributions to saving endangered wildlife |
| 1985 | Henri and Jean de Heaulme | | Madagascar | Worked to preserve Madagascar's unique and endangered wildlife |
| 1984 | Dr. Jane Goodall | | Tanzania | Pioneered research on wild chimpanzees and increased public awareness of conservation efforts |
| 1983 | Alvaro Ugalde and Mario Andres Boza | | Costa Rica | Helped build Costa Rica's national park system |
| 1981 | Dr. Maria Tereza Jorge Pádua and Dr. Paulo Nogueira Neto | | Brazil | Played roles in advancing Brazilian environmental legislation, establishing national parks, and supporting a network of ecological research stations |
| 1980 | Dr. Harold J. Coolidge | | United States | Founded the International Union for Conservation of Nature (IUCN) and in recognition of his career at the National Council |
| 1979 | Dr. Boonsong Lekagul | | Thailand | Rediscovered the kouprey and in recognition of his 30-year commitment to nature education and national parks |
| 1976 | Major Ian Grimwood | | United Kingdom | Rescued the last three Arabian Oryx and worked to protect the wildlife and natural areas of Africa, Asia, and South America |
| 1975 | Dr. Salim Ali | | India | Studied and worked to conserve Asian birds |
| 1974 | Dr. Felipe Benavides | | Peru | Worked to save the vicuña and other endangered Latin American wildlife |

== Brief Awardee Biographies ==
- Salim Ali (1975)
  - Salim Ali, referred to as the "Birdman of India", became the first Indian to conduct systematic bird surveys across India and wrote several bird books that popularized ornithology in India.
- Dr. K. Ullas Karanth (2007)
  - Dr. Karanth has done pioneering work on tiger and other carnivore conservation across India, particularly in the Nagarhole wildlife sanctuary. He is also seen as the motivating spirit behind the creation of three protected areas in the Western Ghats forest of Southeastern India. The money will go towards funding graduate research at the National Center for Biological Sciences in Bangalore.

== See also ==
- List of environmental awards
