= Pan Wenshi =

Chinese biologist and Peking University professor

- 潘文石
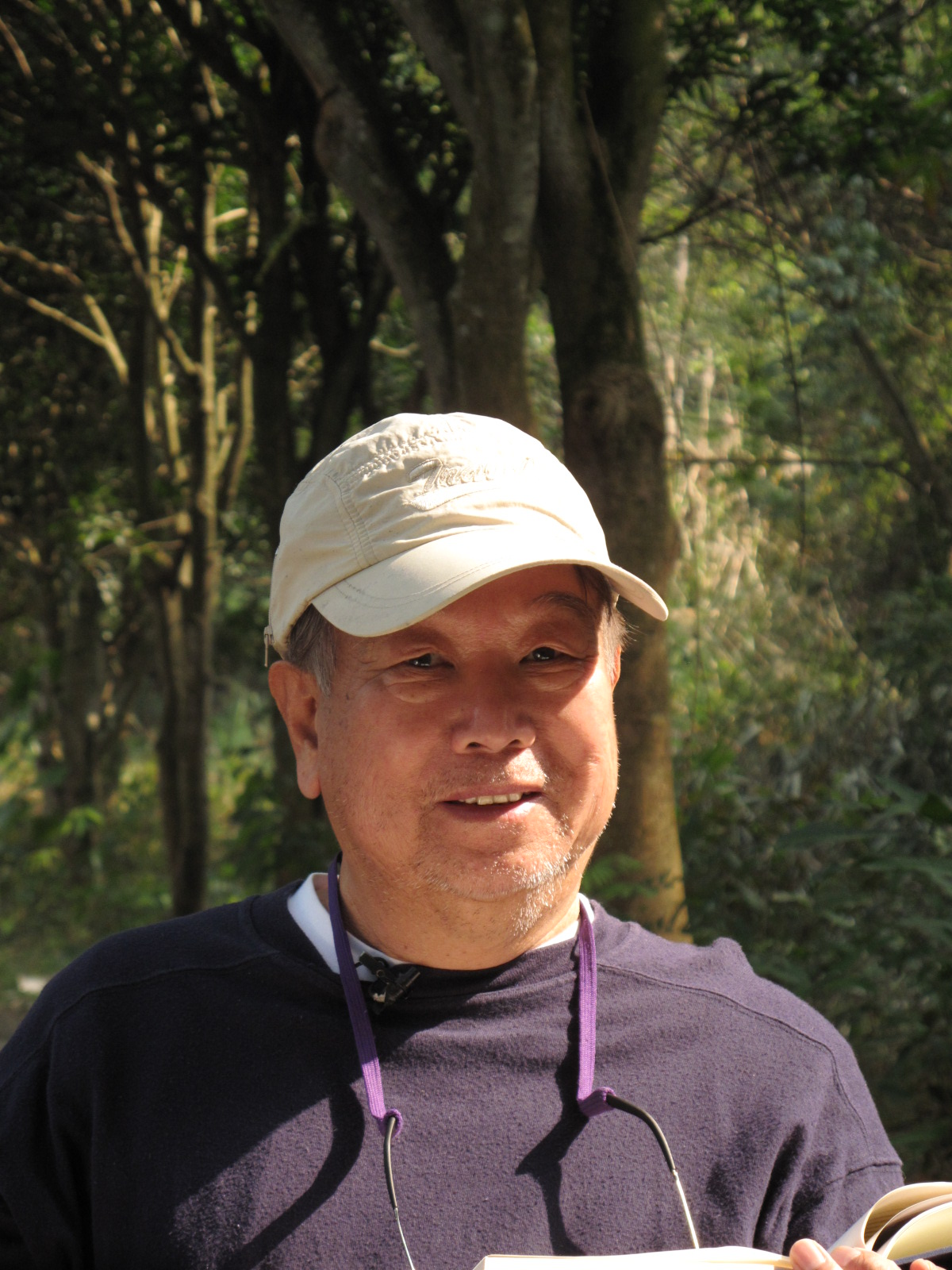
- Pan Wenshi in Chongzuo County, Guangxi in 2010.
- Born: 1937 (age 88–89); Bangkok, Thailand
- Education: Peking University
- Known for: Protecting and researching Giant panda, White-headed langur and Chinese white dolphin
- Children: 1
- Scientific career
- Fields: Biology
- Workplaces: School of Life Sciences, Peking University

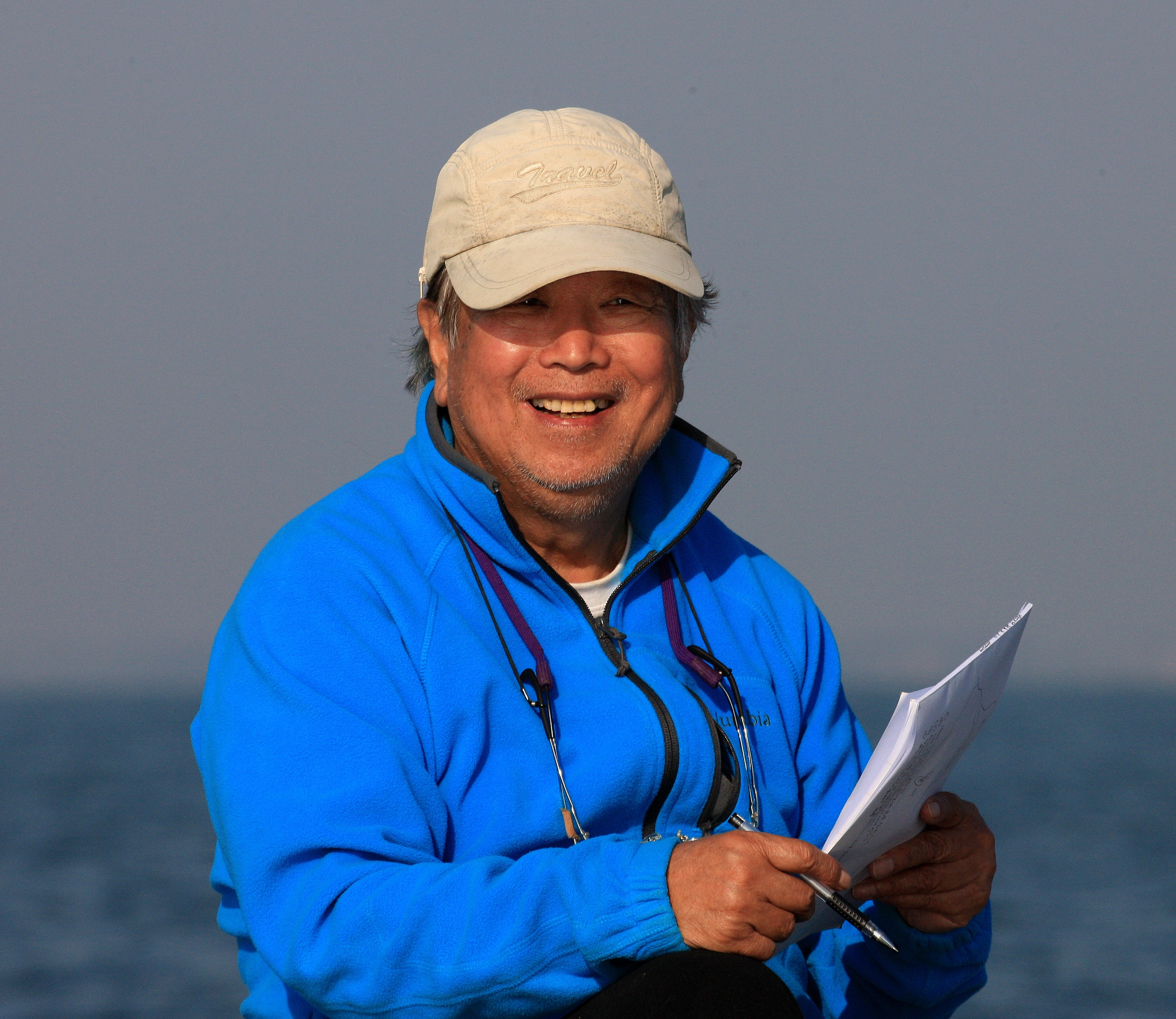
Pan Wenshi in Sanniang Bay of Qinzhou, Guangxi, China in 2013.

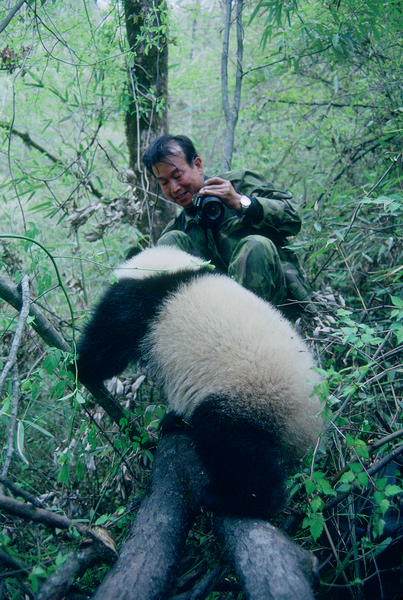
Pan Wenshi in Qin Mountains with Panda-Huzi in 1990.

Pan Wenshi (Chinese: 潘文石; pinyin: Pān Wénshí; born 1937) is a Chinese biologist and Peking University professor. His research works on giant panda, white-headed langur and Chinese white dolphin in the last 36 years are internationally recognized contributions. Pan had authored and co-authored 40-50 treatises published on various domestic and international journals including National Geographic and Nature and he is renowned for his academic achievements on researching the three near-extinct contemporary species. He serves as the director of the Giant Panda and Wildlife Conservation Research Center at Peking University. His work proved that panda habitat needed to be protected for them to survive in the wild and that pandas are polygamous, where previously it was thought that a dominant male secured exclusive breeding rights.

== Biography ==
Pan was born in Bangkok, Thailand in 1937 where his family had lived for five generations. When he was three years old, he moved with his parents to Shantou in Guangdong province.

Pan studied biology at Peking University. His first experience with pandas was seeing the world's first captive-born panda at the Beijing zoo where he got to hold the infant panda.

He has also helped save the white-headed langur species through his work at the Nongguan Nature Reserve in Chongzuo, China. His work to save the langurs focused on both protecting the species, and improving the lives of the nearby villagers who were competing for resources with the langurs. The population of langurs declined from 2,000 in the late 1980s to just 96 when Pan began his work in 1996. Through Pan's efforts, the population has since climbed to over 500 in 2008.

== Academic thoughts ==
In his book The Natural Refuge of Giant Panda at Qinling (秦嶺大熊猫的自然庇護所) co-authored with postgraduates under his supervision, researchers and other collaborators, Pan put forward for the first time arguments supporting “giant pandas in Qinling can survive living in natural conditions” which was acclaimed by international peers to be “significant contribution to the biological theory of giant panda”. Following that in his book Chance for Continual Survival (繼績生存的機會) Pan commented that “since the cause leading to the near-extinct of giant panda was human error, it must require human to rectify their acts in order giant pandas could have a chance for continual survival”. In the book The White Dolphins of Qinzhou (欽州的白海豚) Pan and his co-authors unveiled that Chinese white dolphin appeared in Beibu Gulf only from 6000 years ago and that in the Beibu Gulf population is preserved an ancient and rare genotype that is so far never found in populations in other territorial waters. In the book he as well suggested that the social developments of Qinzhou must be planned to optimize a win-win situation between its economy and nature conservation for that is the only way to achieve sustainable development. The Natural History of White-headed Langur (白頭葉猴自然史) is a live record of researches in wilderness. When Pan went into the Nongguan Mountains he noticed there the sustenance environment was almost totally devastated and that “human was suffering more miserably than the langurs there”. In view of which he suggested “the core issue of nature conservation in Nongguan Mountains is to improve the living conditions of the people there. Only after people’s lives been improved could white-headed langur conservation be anticipated”. 20 years practice of his words has proved his foresight; during the period the white-headed langur population in Nongguan Mountains has increased from the initial of about 100 individuals to about 820 individuals, and the people there have as well gradually improved their livings to well-off standard.

== Awards ==
Pan Wenshi

For his outstanding contributions in nature conservation over 30 years, Pan Wenshi was awarded more than ten China National Awards and seven international awards. Amongst them are:

- Year 1992 National "May 1 Labor" Award (五一勞動獎章)
- Year 1994 China National Federation of Returned Overseas Chinese Patriot Dedication (愛國奉献獎)
- Year 1996 North America Grizzly Funds (北美大熊基金會)-Special Scientific Achievement Award (科學特別成就獎)
- October 1996 Zoological Society of San Diego "Conservation Medal"
- Year 1996 Prince Bernhard of Netherlands the "Golden Ark"
- Year 1999 World Wildlife Fund (WWF) "Paul Getty Award"
- Year 2008 Ford Motor Co. Environmental Conservation Prize "Contributions to Ecological Civilization Award" (生態文明貢獻獎)
- Year 2010 "Worldly Influential Chinese Award" (影響世界華人大獎)
- Year 2014 City of Beijing "Metropolitan Prize" Special Honor (京華獎特別榮譽獎)
