= Reginald Arthur Spence =

Sir Reginald Arthur Spence (1888 – 13 September 1961) was a wine merchant, Freemason, educationist, and philanthropist who worked in India. He was involved in the establishment of Barnes School in Deolali.

Spence was born in 1888. He was educated at Christ's Hospital and worked in India from 1901 in the wine company of Phipson & Co., Bombay along with W.S. Millard and H.M. Phipson. He also volunteered with the Bombay Light Horse, a European regiment, where he became a Lieutenant in 1917. The regiment was involved in ceremonies for visiting dignitaries. Spence as elected to the Legislative Assembly of India for the term of 1921–23. He was also a secretary in the Bombay Natural History Society from 1920 to 1933. A major contribution was on the game fishes of the Bombay region. He helped to establish the natural history section of the Prince of Wales Museum where he was member of the board of trustees. He was also a prominent Freemason, serving as District Grand Master of Bombay. He was knighted in 1926, became Sheriff of Bombay in 1928 and retired to England in 1933. He served in the Sussex Home Guard. He died at his home, Pear Tree Cottage, Blackboys, Sussex in 1961.
