= Emil Weitnauer =

- Born: February 17, 1905; Oltingen, Switzerland
- Died: July 15, 1989 (aged 84)

Emil Weitnauer (17 February 1905 – 15 July 1989) was a Swiss school teacher and ornithologist. Using balloons and radar he was among the first to establish that house swifts roosted in flight in the air at night. He studied the biology of the house swift, later collaborating with Bruno Bruderer.

Weitnauer was born in Oltingen to weaver Johann Jako and Emilie Buess. After the early death of his mother, he was taken care of by an aunt. He became a primary teacher in 1924 at Ormalingen and then at Oltingen . He took an interest in birds and began to study them in detail. His special subjects were owls and swifts. He joined the University of Basel in 1977 and began to study the house swift in collaboration with Bruno Bruderer. He was also involved in bird conservation and education. He was also an organist and served as a lay preacher, presiding over the Oltingen-Wenslingen-Anwil church association.

In 1947 Weitnauer ringed swifts at the nest and found that birds bred only from their second year. 1952 Weitnauer suspected swifts to be spending the night in the air and began his studies making use of a balloon, aircraft and then radar. He found that non-breeding swifts roosted in the air while breeding pairs roosted at the nest. Towards the end of his life he published a book on the house swift.
