= Karuna Mary Braganza =

Indian religious sister (1923–2019)

- Born: 25 October 1923; Mapusa, Goa, India
- Died: 16 October 2019 (aged 95); Pune, India
- Occupations: Educationist; Social worker
- Years active: Since 1950
- Known for: Developmental education Sophia College, Mumbai
- Awards: Padma Shri

Mary Braganza, RCSJ (25 October 1923 – 16 October 2019), popularly known as Karuna Mary, was an Indian Catholic religious sister of the Society of the Sacred Heart, and former principal of Sophia College, Mumbai. Sr. Karuna Mary formerly led 204 colleges managed by the Society of the Sacred Heart. During her tenure at Sophia College, in 1970, the institution started Sophia Polytechnic. In 2008 the Government of India awarded her the fourth highest civilian honour, the Padma Shri for her social contributions.

== Biography ==
Mary Braganza was born on 25 October 1923 in Mapuca in the Indian state of Goa, the fifth of what became 10 children in the family, but grew up in Bandra, a suburb of Mumbai. She graduated from St. Xavier's College, Mumbai, and secured her post-graduate degree from the same institution. Her social activities had already begun during her college days when she organized mission camps in Talasari. She joined the Society of the Sacred Heart in 1950, made her vows in England. Returning to India, she was a teacher at Sophia High School, Bengaluru, and, after working there for a few years, joined Sophia College, Mumbai, in the English department. She rose to become head of that department, vice principal, then principal of the college in 1965, the first Indian to hold the position.

During her tenure as the principal of the college, she initiated several educational and social projects. She founded Bhabha Institute of Science, a division of the college for science education up to graduate level and started new departments for sociology, psychology, and biochemistry. In 1970, the college started a vocational education centre under the name Sophia Polytechnic and five years late began a junior college. Another of her major contributions was the establishment of S.P.J. Sadhana School for the Developmentally Challenged, on the college campus, where differently abled children were given vocational training and provided with opportunities for rehabilitation. She is also known to have encouraged students to take up social activities; student involvement with Warli tribals and at Kosbad were two such programmes.

After retiring from Sophia College, Braganza moved to Delhi and took up the post of Secretary of the All India Association for Christian Higher Education, holding the responsibility of 204 colleges under its jurisdiction. She served the Association for six years till her move to Torpa, a tribal area in present-day Jharkhand state, in 1998, as a teacher of English language at St. Joseph's College. Learning the local dialect of Mundari, she worked among the tribal people and founded the Centre for Women's Development (CWD) and a women's self-help group in 1990. The movement, later, grew to host 5000 members. Her efforts have been reported behind the establishment of an English medium school, creche, children's play school, and a girls' hostel. She was also instrumental in the documentation of indigenous herbs of the area. During this period, she had to face resistance from some of the dissenting locals who alleged conversion, and she survived an attack by local thugs.

In 2000, Braganza went back to Mumbai where she revived the Alumni Association of Sophia College and became involved with their activities as the director of the association for five years. She was also involved in rural programmes of Sisters of Color Ending Sexual Assault (SCESA) such as rainwater harvesting in Mangaon in the Raigad district of Maharashtra. In 2005, when Zainab Tobaccowala Secular High School, a local school, was devastated by the floods, she took up the cause and generated funds for the reconstruction and assisted in the re-establishment of the school by helping to hire competent teachers. Her involvement is also reported in the establishment of Sophia Center for Women's Studies, division for vocational studies, at Sophia College, and in the relocation and rebuilding of St Mary's Convent School, Matara, a Tsunami-affected school in Sri Lanka. A periodic writer on developmental education, she has served as the editor of the newsletter published by the Indian Association for Women's Studies (IAWS), where she regularly contributed editorial articles.

The Government of India awarded her the civilian honour of the Padma Shri in 2008. Braganza, a life member of the Centre for Women's Development Studies (CWDS), retired in 2006 and lived in Pune. Her life has been documented in a 396-page book, The Charism of Karuna – Life Story of Sister Karuna Mary Braganza, published in 2011.

Braganza died in Pune on 16 October 2019, at the age of 95.
