= Anil Zankar =

Indian film critic and historian

Anil Zankar is an Indian film critic and historian.

== Career ==
Anil Zankar is a recipient of two national awards, one for a film script and the other for a book on cinema and a visiting faculty of humanities and social sciences at the Indian Institute of Science Education and Research, Pune. He has 35 years of experience in filmmaking, teaching, and writing. Zankar is an alumnus of the Film and Television Institute of India (FTII, Pune). He has made 21 short films on social issues and institutions, biopics, and corporate themes. He is a historian of cinema. What's more, he has attended seminars on international cinema, has presented papers at international conferences (Poland, 2006; Japan, 2014) and has been invited as a visiting scholar by the Indian Institute of Advanced Studies (Shimla, 2014). [1][2][3][4] Anil Zankar has taught at the Department of Humanities and Social Sciences, IISER Pune since 2017.

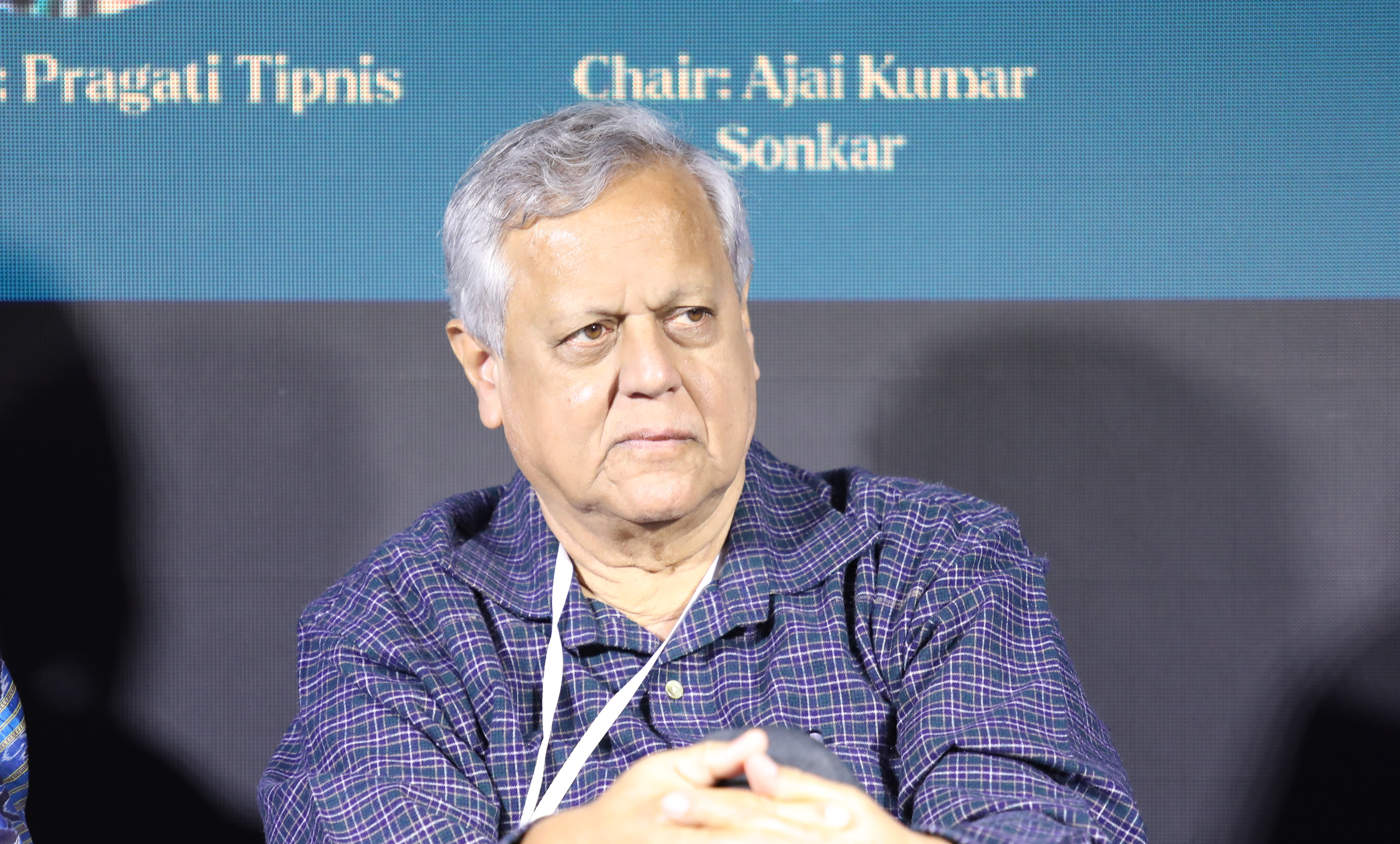
Anil Zankar at the Moscow International Book Fair 2025

== Editor ==
- Lights Camera Action was published in collaboration with BFI, UK.

== Writer ==
- Mughal-e-Azam - HarperCollins (author)
- Routledge Handbook Of Indian Cinema (co-author)
- Britannica - Encyclopaedia of Hindi Cinema (co-author)
- Cinemachi Goshta

== Speaker at Conferences ==
- Goa Arts and Literature Festival
- Taj Literature Festival (Agra)
- Pune International Literary Festival

== Actor ==
He has played cameos in two recent productions, as Dr. Kamath in Mission Mangal and as Sitaram Yechuri in Accidental Prime Minister.

== Jury member ==
FCCI Award for Best Indian Film, at the All Lights India International Film Festival

== See also ==
- Film Critics Circle of India
