= St. Xavier's College, Mumbai =

College affiliated with the University of Mumbai

St. Xavier's College
- Coat of arms
- Motto: Provocans Ad Volandum (Latin)
- Motto in English: Encouraging to Fly
- Type: Private
- Established: 2 January 1869; 157 years ago
- Founder: Jesuits
- Religious affiliation: Catholic Church
- Academic affiliations: International Association of Jesuit Universities; University of Mumbai; Maharashtra State Board of Secondary and Higher Secondary Education
- Chairman: Fr. Arun D'Souza, SJ
- Rector: Fr. Keith D'Souza, SJ
- Principal: Dr. Karuna Gokarn
- Undergraduates: 2,648 (as of 2007)
- Postgraduates: 99 (as of 2007)
- Location: Mumbai, Maharashtra, India; 18.9432°N 72.8313°E
- Campus: Urban; 2.94 acres (11,900 m^{2})
- Colors
- Website: xaviers.edu

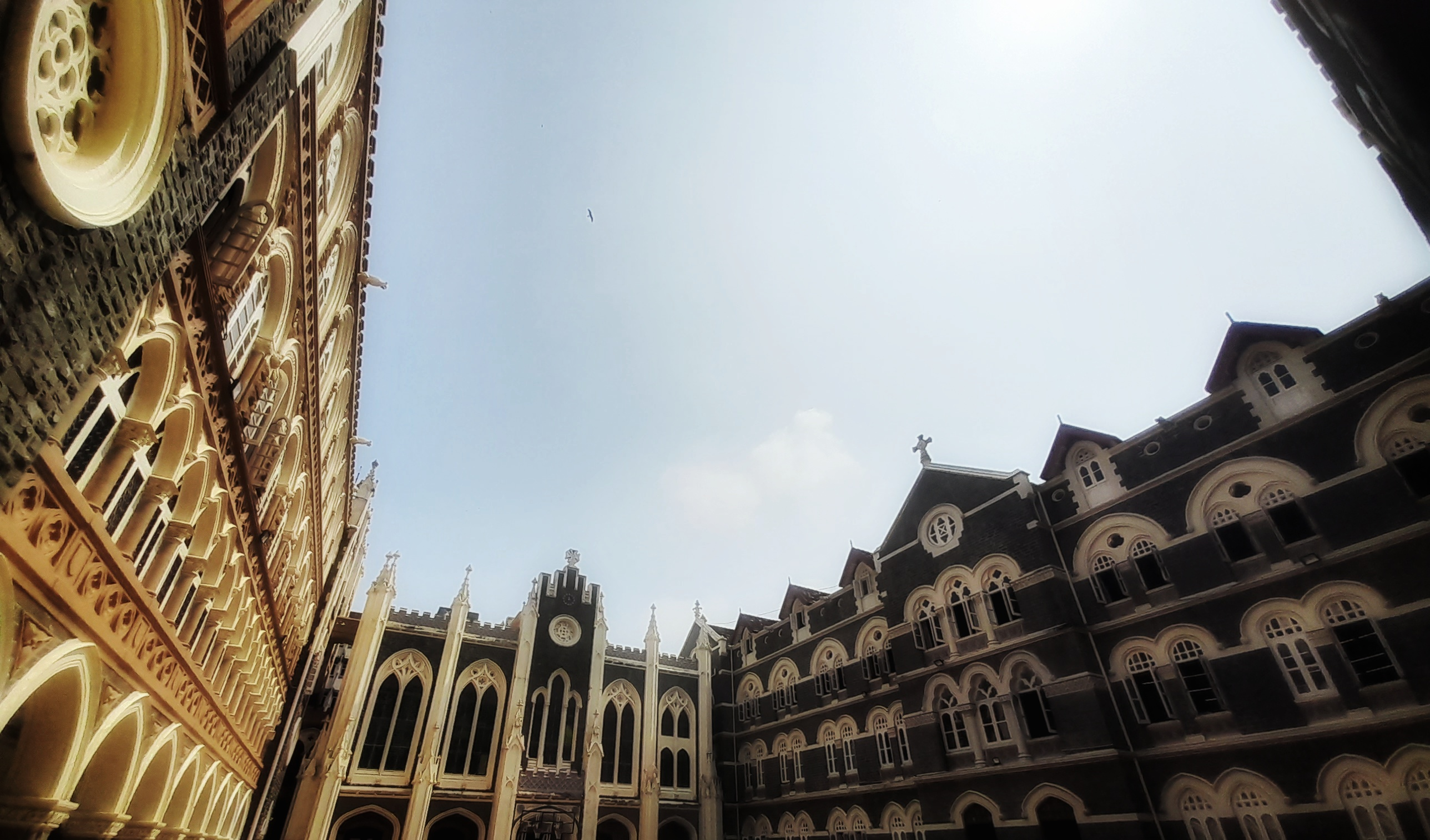
St. Xavier's College, Mumbai

St. Xavier's College is a private, Catholic college run by the Jesuits of the Bombay Province in Mumbai, Maharashtra, India. It was founded on 2 January 1869. The college is affiliated with the University of Mumbai and offers undergraduate and postgraduate courses in Arts, Science, Commerce and Management. Xavier's was the first college to be granted autonomy by the University of Mumbai in 2010. In 2006, St. Xavier's was awarded the 'A+' grade by National Assessment and Accreditation Council (NAAC).

The college is named after Francis Xavier, the 16th-Century Spanish Jesuit saint. Its campus in South Mumbai is built in the Indo-Gothic style of architecture, and recognized as a heritage structure. Founded by German Jesuits in 1869, Xavier's developed rapidly from 1884 to 1914. The imprisonment of German Jesuit priests during the First World War (1914–1918) led to a dislocation of the administration, which was mitigated by the appointment of other European Jesuits. The college began as an arts institution but by the 1920s had science departments as well. The college was greatly expanded in the 1930s.

The college is now run by Indian Jesuits, with a distinct focus on affirmative action for minority students. It offers undergraduate and post-graduate courses in Arts, Science, Business, Commerce and Public Policy. It is known for its famous inter-collegiate youth event 'Malhar Fest'.

== History ==
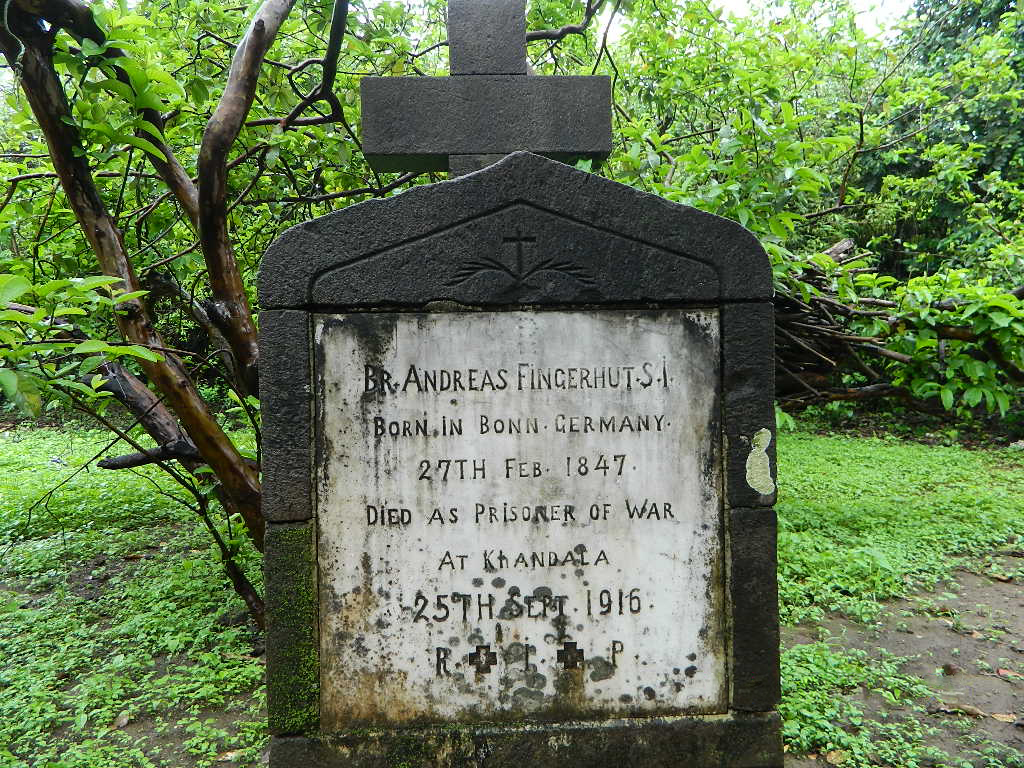
Tombstone Tablet of Founders

St. Xavier's College was founded on 2 January 1869 in Bombay by German Jesuits, with only two students in attendance. The two students came from a group of six who appeared for the university matriculation examination in 1868 from St. Mary's Institution. Swiss Jesuit Joseph Michael Willi (or Willy), the first principal of the college from 1869 to 1873, and three other Jesuits began lecturing and teaching at the college on 7 January 1869. The college was granted formal recognition by the Bombay University, on 30 January 1869. One student joined later in 1870. The first three students graduated in 1871. From 1884 to 1910, under the patronage of Principal Frederick Dreckmann, the college began to develop rapidly. The Blatter Herbarium was established in 1906 by the Swiss Jesuit priest Ethelbert Blatter and his associates. The hostel was completed in 1909, while the east–west science wing, costing Rs. 200,000, was completed in 1912. The Government provided grants of Rs. 70,000 and Rs. 37,000 for the two additional buildings of the college. The college first admitted women in 1912.

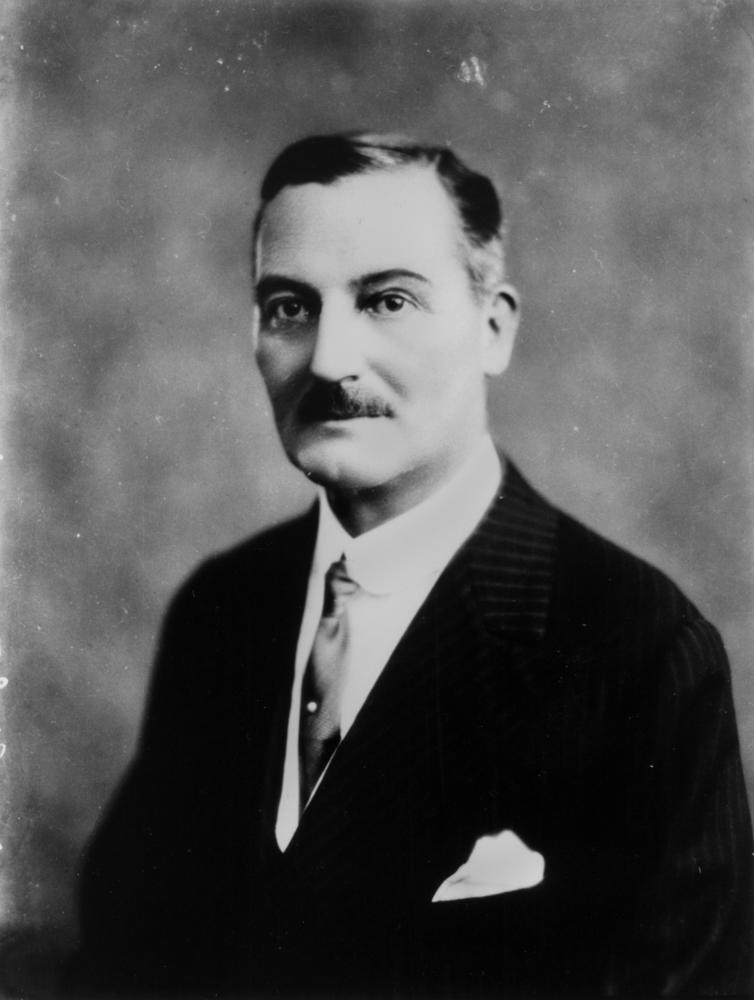
Leslie Orme Wilson, Governor of Bombay (1923–1926), inaugurated the extension of the east–west science wing in 1926

Being a German institute in British India, the college suffered wide repercussions during the First World War (1914–1918). Following the outbreak of the war, the German Jesuit priests, mainly the older ones, were interned and detained in 1914, at the college villa in Khandala, where many died. However, the younger German Jesuits were repatriated in 1916. The departure of German Jesuits led to a dislocation in the administration of the college, but it was mitigated by a few Swiss, Luxemburger, and English Jesuits. The number of lay professors increased following the withdrawal of the German Jesuits. In 1920, the enrollment of students from outside Bombay, especially Calcutta, Yangon, Mangalore, and Sindh, started increasing. Subsequently, a third floor was added to the hostel to provide accommodation facilities for them. The college started offering six more languages: Marathi, Gujarati, Urdu, Arabic, Hebrew, and Portuguese. The Spanish Jesuits arrived in 1922. By the 1920s, the college had expanded its offerings to more than just liberal arts. Science departments such as Chemistry and Biology came to be established. The Spanish Jesuit Henry Heras founded the "Indian Historical Research Institute" in 1925. The extension of the east–west science wing was completed in 1925 and opened by Leslie Orme Wilson, Governor of Bombay (1923–1926), on 26 January 1926, at an outlay of Rs. 200,000.

The following decade, the priest Gonzalo Palacios propelled massive architectural expansions, with the addition of a third floor to the east–west science wing and in April 1935 the demolition of the Chemistry shed. The General Library was shifted to the new central building providing space for over 100,000 books and 6,000 volumes of periodicals. The college took charge of the Abdulla Fazalbhoy Technical Institute for Radio and Cinema (now St. Xavier's Technical Institute) near Mahim Causeway. More rooms were added to the hostel together with a tower. The construction of the college chapel, which had begun in 1937, was completed under the reign of Principal Aloysius Coyne (1940–1949). The college hall was inaugurated in January 1937 by Lord Brabourne, Governor of Bombay (1933–1937). In August 1939, the non-degree course for the Teacher's Diploma was started, while Microbiology was revolutionized. After India's independence in 1947, Hindi began to be taught in the college from June 1949 and several new departments were instituted, such as the Department of Sociology and Anthropology (1951) and the Department of Psychology (1957).

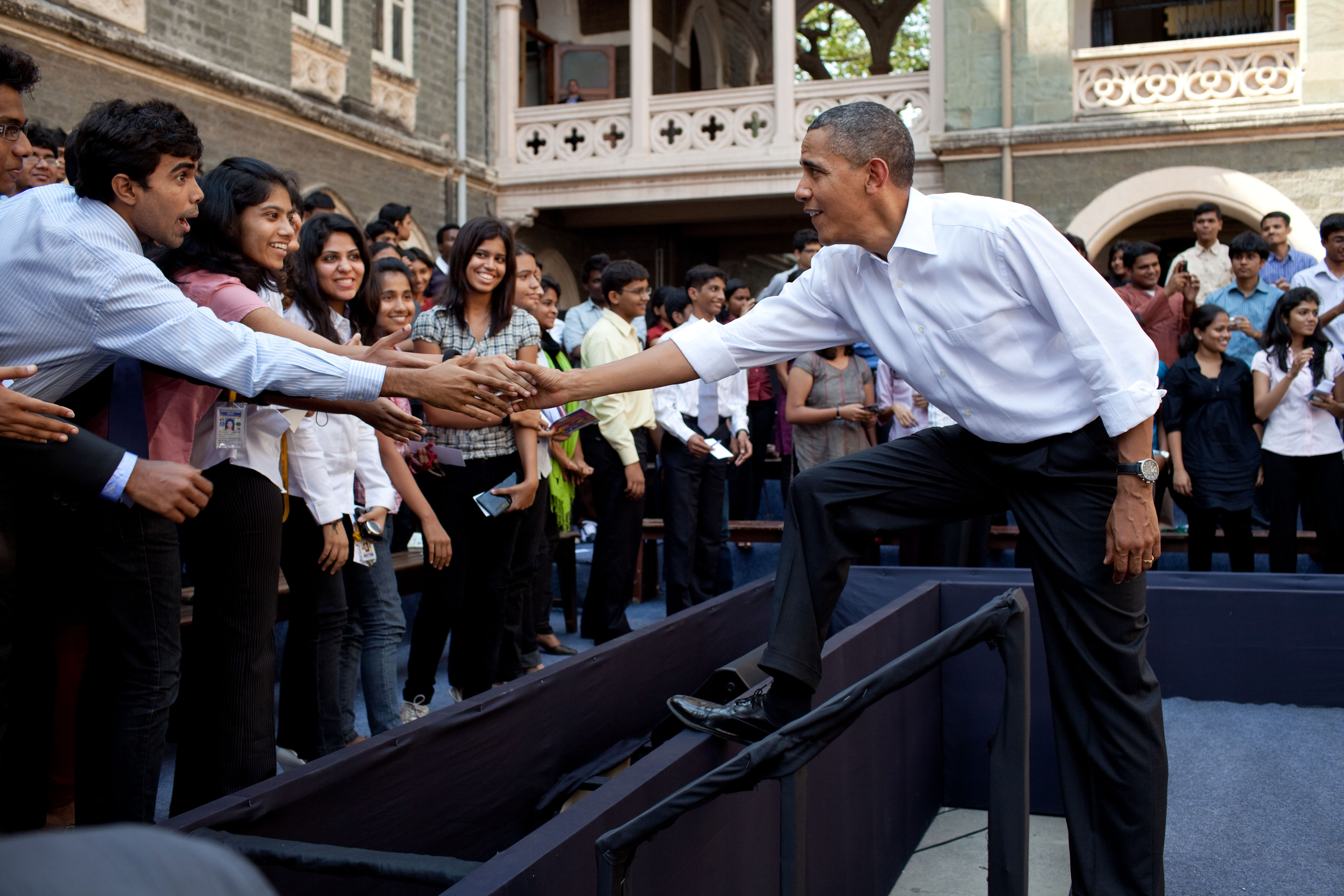
Barack Obama greeting students (2010)

In the later 20th century, St. Xavier's has continued to expand in student body and faculty size, and has seen the establishment of several research centers and programs. Indian Jesuits of the Bombay Province have run the college in close collaboration with the Society of Jesus in Germany and Spain.

On 18 July 2009, United States Secretary of State Hillary Clinton visited the college. She conducted an interactive session with its students regarding academics and education. In November 2010 US President Barack Obama visited the college and held a town hall meeting.

== Religious affiliation and ethos ==
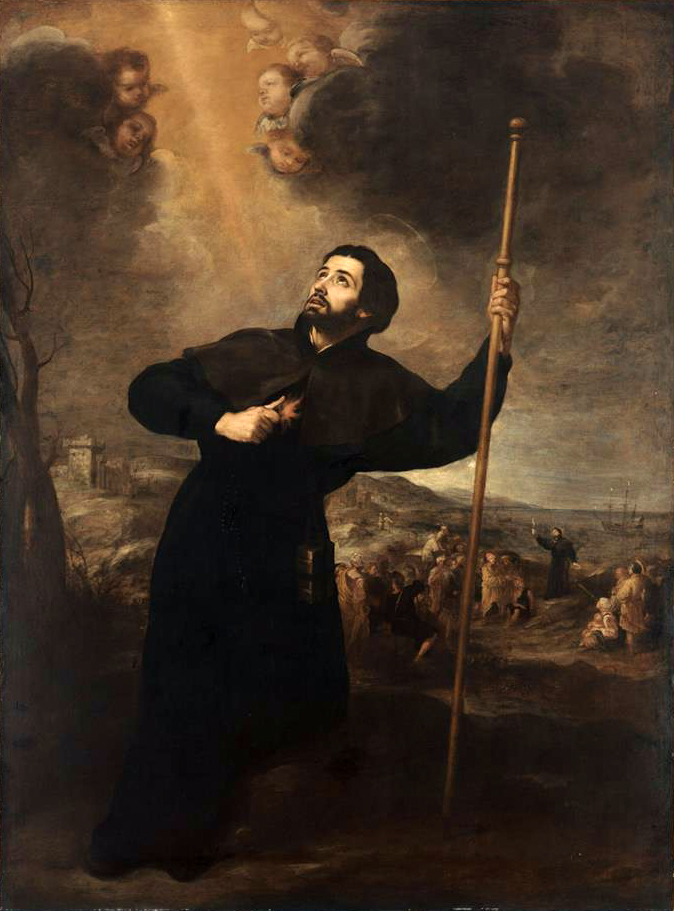
Francis Xavier, after whom the college is named

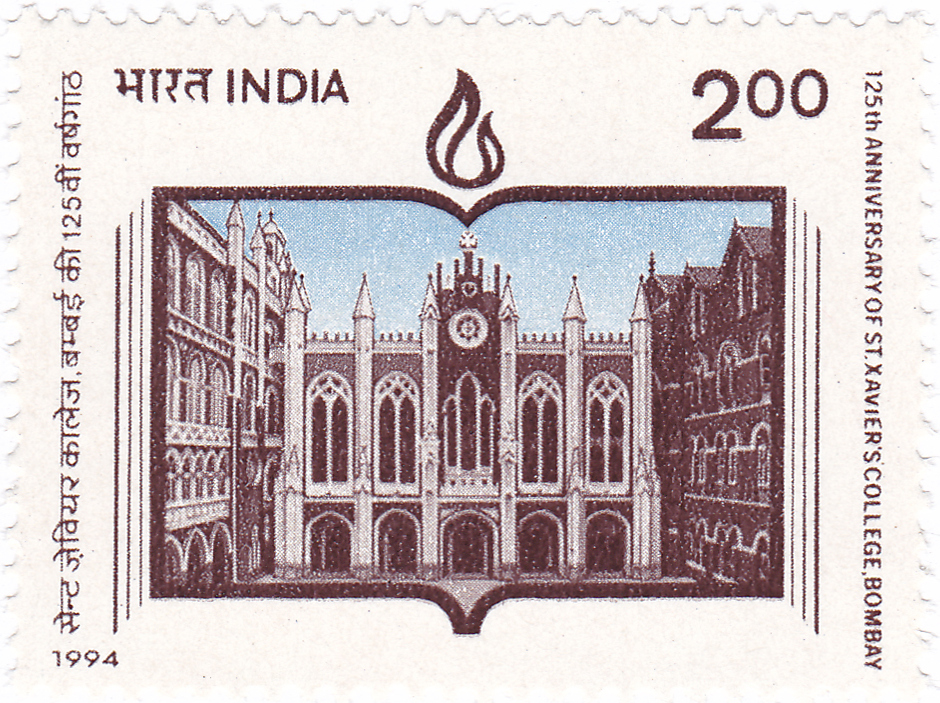
A 1994 stamp dedicated to the 125th anniversary of St. Xavier's College

The college is Roman Catholic and the Society of Jesus exercises responsibility over it through a Governing Body whose chairman is the Provincial of the Bombay Province of the Society. St. Xavier's College is named after Francis Xavier, a Spanish Jesuit saint of the 16th century who travelled to India. The college seeks to give an all-round formation, inculcating both human and spiritual values. It gives special consideration to Roman Catholics (under the minority rights enshrined in the Constitution of India) for whose education the college was founded. Currently 50% of the seats are reserved for Christians, with priority given to the Roman Catholic denomination.

=== Invocation ===
The college invocation is the Ignatian Suscipe:

Take and receive, O Lord my liberty,
Take all my will, My mind my memory,
Do thou direct and govern all and sway,
Do what thou wilt, command and I obey.

Only thy grace and love on me bestow,
Possessing these, all riches I forgo.

All things I hold and all I own are thine,
Thine was the gift, to thee I all resign.

Lord teach me how to serve,
Gladly as you deserve,
To give and not to count the cost, to fight not heeding pain,
May I give of my best, may I not seek for rest,
and ask for no reward save that, I know I do your will.

— Prayer of St. Ignatius of Loyola

=== Crest and motto ===
The crest was designed by Fr. T. Molina in 1929, a student of heraldry and a member of the college staff. It shows an eagle teaching its young to fly. Above it, on the left side, is the emblem of the Society of Jesus, which consists of the first three Greek initials for "Jesus" set in a sun; on the right is a chequered moon, taken from the arms of the house of Xavier. The Latin motto Provocans Ad Volandum, "Challenging to Fly", is central to the ethos of the college and comes from the Bible, which mentions how the eagle encourages its young to fly (Dt. 32.11). As a whole, the crest symbolizes a college that bears the name of Xavier and is run by the Jesuits, with the ideal of educating young men and women to aim high in life.

== Accreditation and assessment ==
Since 30 January 1869, St. Xavier's College has been affiliated with the University of Mumbai. It is accredited by the university with the task of preparing students for degrees in arts, Science, and Commerce. It was made a constituent college of the university in 1953 following the Bombay University Act 1953 and received recognition by the University Grants Commission (UGC) since 1956.

In 2007, the college was awarded the highest rating A+ (5-Star) in the re-accreditation by the National Assessment and Accreditation Council (NAAC), an autonomous body linked to the University Grants Commission of India. The national India Today magazine's report on colleges has consistently rated Xavier's in the top 10 in India in recent years. In the June 2000 and June 2006 issues, Xavier's has been rated the best arts college and the second best science and commerce college in the country. The UGC awarded St. Xavier's the "College with a Potential for Excellence" award in 2006.

On 31 May 2010, St. Xavier's was granted autonomy by the University Grants Commission, thereby becoming only the second college in Mumbai to be granted such a status.

== Administration ==
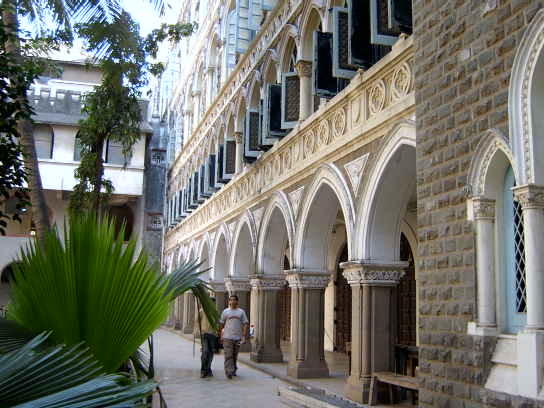
The Second Quadrangle Arches

The Governing Body consists of the chairman, vice chairman, ex-officio trustees, members, the local managing committee, and an advisory council. The principal functions through the Academic Council of the three vice principals and other important officials, aided by the Internal Quality Assurance Cell (IQAC) which is responsible for planning and evaluation of the college. Various committees of staff and students take responsibility for the different activities of the college. The Local Managing Committee (LMC) has nine members, including the principal as the secretary and rector as the chairperson, and meets twice every year. It prepares the budget and financial statements, recommends creation of new posts, recommends measures for academic and administrative improvement, and undertakes many other vital decision-making activities. The prospective plan for institutional development is done after consecutive meetings with the Academic Council, IQAC, and the heads of the departments. The college takes measures to upgrade the skills of non-teaching staff by conducting workshops and training programmes during vacations, and by conducting sessions on personality enhancement and financial management. An Advisory Council of eminent alumni has also been constituted.

The college has ninety permanent teachers (of whom 53 are women) and an additional three full-time teachers, eleven part-time, and two teachers working as full-time on temporary assignment, raising the number of full-time teachers to 95. The teacher-student ratio is 1:33. Three teachers have been accorded special awards and recognition for their distinguished service.

== Courses ==
As of 2007, the college remains mainly an undergraduate college, with 2,648 undergraduate students and 99 postgraduate students. The syllabi for undergraduate and postgraduate courses are prepared by the University of Mumbai, and include mid-term tests and final examinations. The success rate of students is 90 to 100 percent across all departments, and 95 to 100 percent in university examinations. Special considerations are given to Catholics, economically and socially disadvantaged applicants, and students from scheduled castes (SC) and Scheduled Tribes (ST). Programs operated by the college include The Learning for Life Programme, Honours Programme, Social Involvement Programme, and Personality and Human Values.

=== Junior college courses ===
Junior college courses in science, arts and commerce last two years. Applicants are evaluated on their performance in the Secondary School Certificate (SSC) examination of the Mumbai Divisional Board. The commerce course has been recently began in the academic year 2022–23. Arts and Science are both aided courses while Commerce is not.

=== Undergraduate degree courses ===
Undergraduate degree courses last three years. Applicants are evaluated based on their academic performance in the Higher Secondary School Certificate (HSC) examination of the Mumbai Divisional Board.

- Bachelor of Arts (B.A.) (Aided)
- Bachelor of Science (B.Sc.) (Aided)
- Bachelor of Science – Information Technology (B.Sc. IT)
- Bachelor of Science – Data science and Artificial intelligence (B.Sc. DSAI)
- Bachelor of Science – Biotechnology and Computational Biology (B.Sc. BCB)
- Bachelor of Commerce (B.Com.)
- Bachelor of Commerce, Management Studies (B.Com. MS), formerly known as Bachelor of Management Studies (BMS)
- Bachelor of Arts, Economics and Statistics (ECO-STATS)
- Bachelor of Commerce, Accounting and Finance (BAF)
- Bachelor of Arts, Mass Communication & Journalism (B.A. MCJ), formerly known as Bachelor of Mass Media (BMM)
- Bachelor of Vocation – Software Development
- Bachelor of Vocation – Tourism

=== Postgraduate courses ===
- Master of Science (MSc)
- Doctor of Philosophy (PhD) in Arts & Science
- Masters of Public Policy (M.P.P)
- Postgraduate Diploma in Data Science (PGDDS)

=== Diploma courses ===
- Clinical Research
- Forensic Science
- Expressive Arts Therapy
- Gemmology
- Industrial Biotechnology and Enterprise

=== Certification courses ===
- Diamond Grading
- Jewellery Design
- Data Analytics

== Institutes ==
Several institutes have been established on St. Xavier's campus, including:

Research Institutes

- Blatter Herbarium for taxonomic studies
- Caius Laboratory for Inter-Disciplinary Research (medical)
- Heras Institute of Indian History and Culture
- Nadkarni-Sacasa Research Laboratory (chemistry)

Non-research Institutes

- Xavier Institute of Communications
- Xavier Institute of Counselling
- Xavier Institute of Social Research
- Xavier Institute of Management & Research
- Xavier Knowledge Center for computers
- Xavier's Resource Centre for the Visually Challenged

=== Xavier Institute of Management & Research ===
Xavier Institute of Management & Research (XIMR) is the management school of St. Xavier's College, Mumbai. It is approved by the All India Council for Technical Education.

XIMR was established in 1963 by Professor Pascoal Gisbert as St. Xavier's Social Institute of Industry, when India was striving to achieve self-sufficiency. In 1971 the institute's focus shifted to supervisory and managerial skills and its name was changed to Xavier Institute of Management. In 2006 it became the Xavier Institute of Management and Research.

XIMR trains managers with skills in doing business internationally and globally and facilitates entry into African markets.

In January 2011, the Centre for Africa Studies was launched in association with Makerere University Business School in Uganda, East Africa.

== Campus and facilities ==
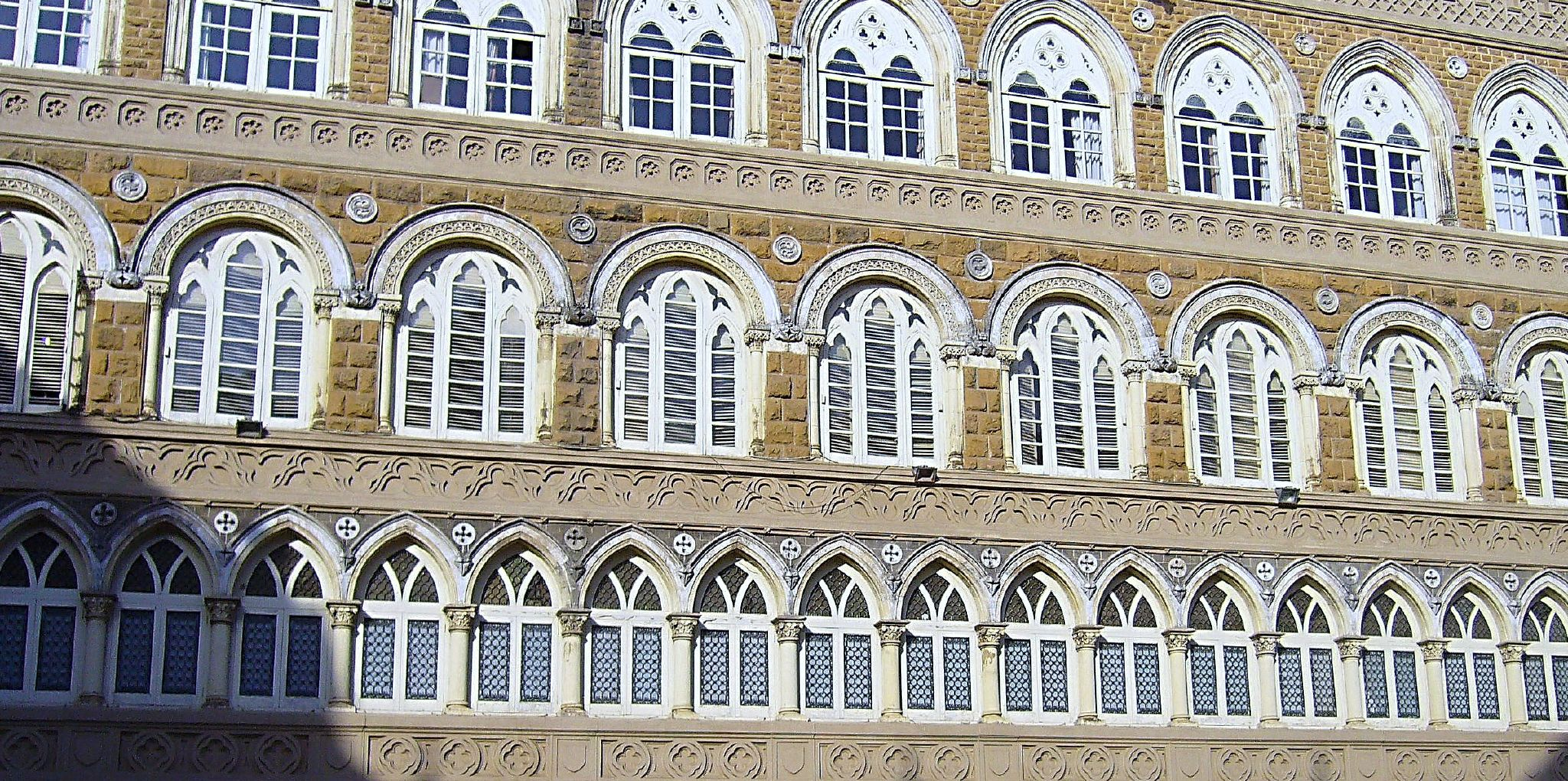
The college is built in the Indo-Gothic style of architecture

St. Xavier's stands on a 2.94 acres (11,900 m^{2}) campus in the Fort locality of South Mumbai. It is located near the Chhatrapati Shivaji Terminus (CST) railway station, which serves as the headquarters of the Central Railways, and Churchgate station, which serves as the headquarters of the Western Railways. The college is built in the Indo-Gothic style of architecture, and has been recognized as a heritage structure by the Mumbai Heritage Conservation Committee. The main college library is central and common to all the academic activities of the college. It has a collection of 133,489 books, of which more than 50% are reference books, with some dating back to the 16th century. It also receives 76 journals, of which 14 are foreign journals. The library has a carved cabinet, card index of books, and a computerized database of books. Students have access to a lending library, reference library, paperback library, non-print media library, and a vast collection of journals, current and back volumes. Books are lent out at the lending library, which also houses the online public access catalog (OPAC) for information search.

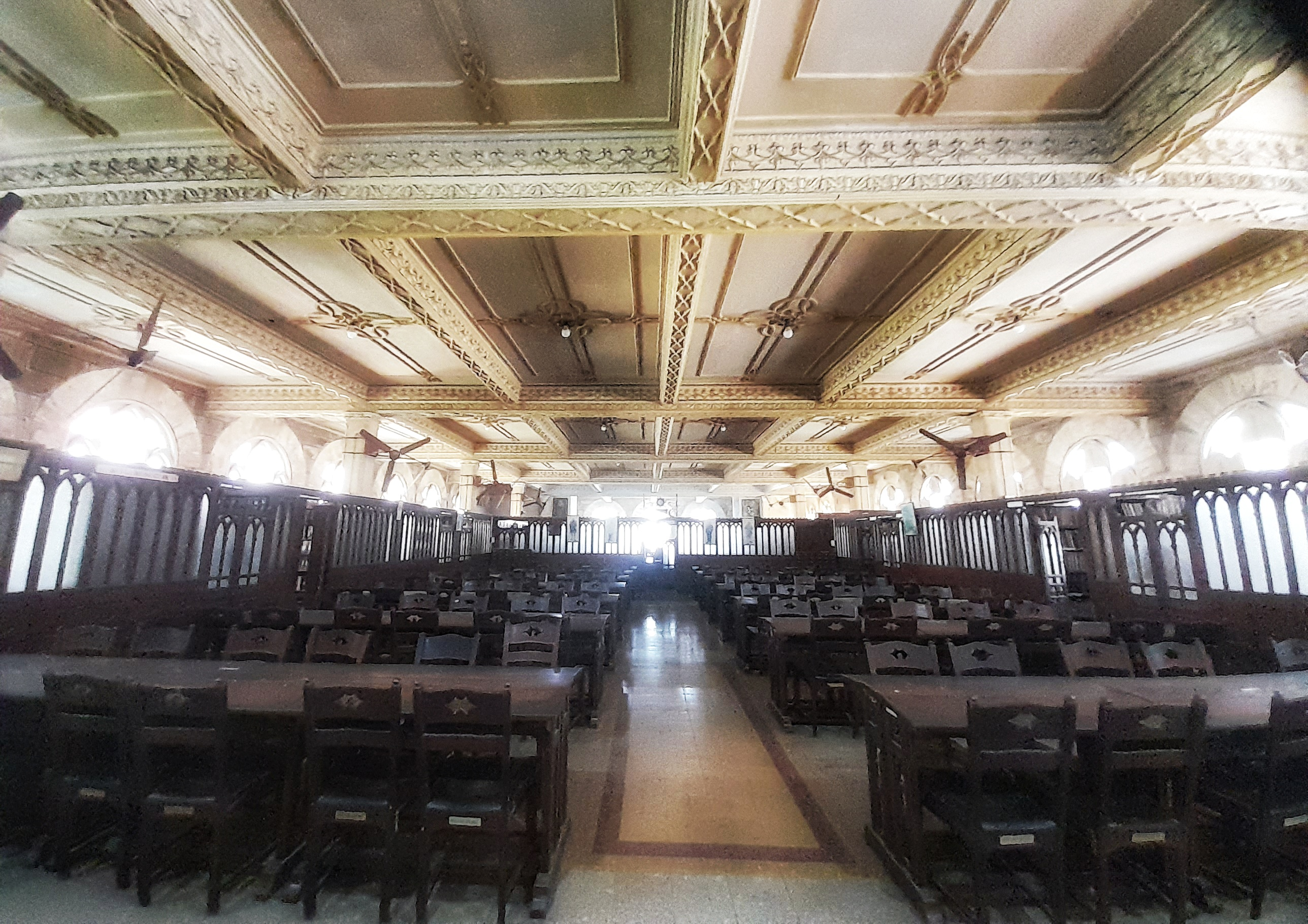
Reference library, St. Xavier's College

The reference library includes reserve counters, overnight loans, photo-copying services, reference services, inter-library loans, journals, reference books, and a special multi-media facility for accessing compact disks (CDs) on computers. Students also have access to a paperback library and a non-print media library where audio cassettes, television, and video cassette recorder (VCR) facilities are available for group and individual use.

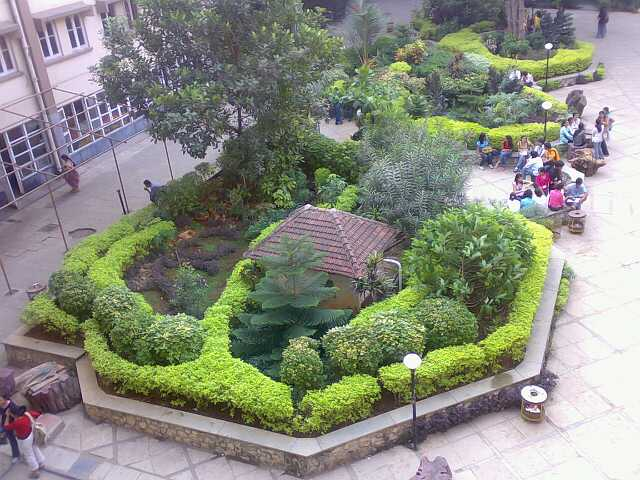
"The Woods" leisure space

The campus also has a leisure space known as "The Woods" which includes a couple of large trees. The college runs a small hostel on campus for male students of the senior college. The hostel has a capacity of 60 students, two to three occupants to a room. The college also has a chapel cum prayer hall with green, stained-glass exteriors, arching vaults, and intricate marble work, behind the façade facing the college quadrangle. It has two fully equipped audio-visual centres, the Smith Centre for Audio-Visual Instruction (SCAVI), with a seating capacity of 100, and the Multi-Media Room (MMR) which seats 110. Classrooms have partially Information technology (IT) enabled accessories, fiberglass boards, and pull-down screens. A full-fledged language laboratory has also been set up to cater to students from non-English medium schools and to promote multi-language skills. There is also an auditorium, a spacious canteen, and full-size basketball and volleyball courts. The Fell Gymkhana, built in 1954, provides bodybuilding, badminton, table-tennis, carrom, chess, and other recreational facilities for staff and students. The St. Xavier's Villa in Khandala is a property of the college nestled in the hills of the Western Ghats mountain range, about two hours from Mumbai. It provides facilities for retreats, seminars, and educational conferences. The college also has a cricket pitch leased by the Brihanmumbai Municipal Corporation (BMC) on the Azad Maidan sports ground, near the college.

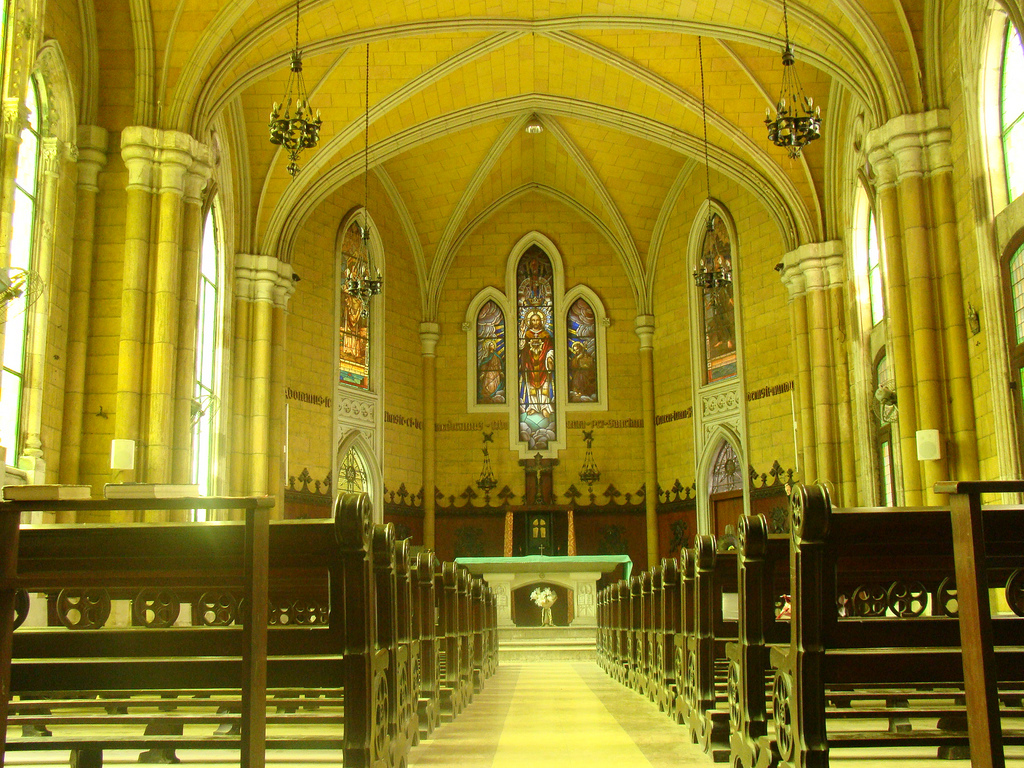
College chapel

The college counselling centre, founded in 1954, provides personal counselling, personality-evaluation tests, testing programmes for vocational purposes, information on careers, professions, and specialized studies in India and abroad, information on scholarships and financial assistance schemes, and admission guidance to students; it also organizes orientation programmes. The college placement centre exposes students to reputed employers, trains them in writing resumes, and acquaints them with the selection process of corporations. There are separate common rooms for male and female students and for teaching and non-teaching staff. The Xavier's Women's Development Cell was formed in 2006 to coordinate programmes for awareness and action on women's issues, since girls constitute more than 60% of the student body. It also serves as a grievance redressal cell for complaints of sexual harassment. First aid centres are also available in the college general office and the counselling centre. The college undertakes a number of welfare measures for students and staff including provision of insurance coverage. The college has also set up a Grievance Redressal Cell with a representative from a Non-governmental Organization (NGO).

=== Films shot on the campus ===
- Mehboob Ki Mehndi (1971)
- Kucch To Hai (2003)
- Main Hoon Na (2004), in college library
- Jaane Tu... Ya Jaane Na (2008), for song "Kabhi Kabhi Aditi"
- Paa (2009)
- Janatha Garage (2016) for the song "Pranaamam Pranaamam"
- Hichki (2018)
- Lust Stories (2018) Netflix
- Satyameva Jayate (2018)
- Helicopter Eela (2018)
- Hotel Mumbai (2018)
- Kabir Singh (2019)
- Student of the Year 2 (2019)
- Sacred Games 2 (2019)
- 99 Songs (2019)
- Darbar (2020)
- Drishyam 2 (2022)
- Saiyaara (2025)

== Extra-curricular activities ==
Xavier's students, "Xavierites", maintain relationships with peers from other colleges by participating in inter-college competitions and college festivals.

The Extra Curricular Credits Committee (ECC) monitors the performance of students and sends contingents to other colleges.

Mosaic is an inter-disciplinary, interdepartmental series of exhibitions and poster presentations.

=== Student associations ===
The Alumni Association, established in 1902, is actively involved in fundraising, providing scholarships, career counseling, and felicitation of the retiring staff. The Indian Music Group (IMG) was founded in 1973 to promote Indian Classical Music in the city, especially among its young people. It organises concerts, lecture-demonstrations and music appreciation courses. Its annual Indian classical music festival, Janfest, is well known.

Students organize several hobby clubs such as the Philately Club and the Star Gazers Club.

=== Festivals ===
Malhar, one of the most popular college festivals in the city, is hosted by the students of St. Xavier's College. It is an inter-collegiate youth festival held since 1979. It is usually in August during the rains and involves teams from about 60 other colleges in Mumbai and elsewhere, with around 30 cultural contests in the Literary, Performing Arts, and Fine Arts categories, along with a number of Workshops on different themes. It draws about 20,000 student participants and audience to the college Campus.

Janfest is a well-known Indian classical music festival in India, held in January and hosted by the Indian Music Group (IMG). Inaugurated in 1974, it promotes classical music among the youth and offers a platform for young people to showcase their talent. It has played host to maestros of Indian classical music like Hariprasad Chaurasia, Zakir Hussain, and Ravi Shankar.

The Zephyrus conference is organised by the Bachelor of Management Studies (BMS) department and features renowned speakers from the business world.

Additionally, the college hosts Ithaka, the annual English literature and theatre festival organised by the English Literature department since 1990. It is a platform for students to demonstrate their theatrical talents. Theatre personalities such as Qasar Padamsee started their careers in Ithaka.

The college also holds Aamod, a festival organised by Marathi Vangmay Mandal which is the first and the oldest Marathi Association registered with Mumbai University.

In 2011–12, the Mass Media department organised Zeitgeist – The Media Conference for the first time. It has welcomed panellists like Shekhar Kapoor and Madhu Trehan. It also organised a screening of the film The Untitled Kartik Krishnan Project. Then in 2012 Xavier hosted its first science fest "Paradigm", an all-Inclusive, pan-departmental, inter-collegiate science festival. Paradigm '12 hosted Vice Admiral Shekhar Sinha along with Sunjoy Monga, Ajoy Ghatak, and Raghavendra Gadagkar who delivered talks on a wide variety of topics.

== Magazines and publications ==
The college launched its commemorative Coffee Table Book St. Xavier's College – Celebrating Diversity since 1869, as a part of its 140 years celebration. It covers all aspects of the college's mighty tradition, to the present. Each March and September Heras Institute of Indian History and Culture, within the college campus, publishes the research journal Indica. It began publication in 1964 and emphasizes the research work of staff and students at Heras Institute. Then there are the St. Xavier's College magazine and the online newsletter The Xavierite, covering stories, events, and reports related to the college and its alumni. Student magazines include Ithaka (Literature), Elemental (Chemistry), Aithihasik (History), Samvad (Political Science), Eidos (Sociology), Imprint (Zoology), "Lignum vitae (Life Science) The Catchphrase (Mass Media),The Michronicle (Microbiology), Pakharan (Marathi Vangmay Mandal), B.I.T.M.A.P (Information Technology) and Arthniti (Economics).

A monthly newspaper The Xavier's Press was inaugurated in December 2008 by the Student Council and is run entirely by undergraduates. It covers events and issues of interest to the general student body.

== Notable alumni ==
The alumni of St. Xavier's College include many figures prominent in Indian society over the past century. Alumni of the college include members of the London Round Table conferences, governors of Indian states, ambassadors, union and state ministers, justices of the Supreme Court of India, and of the Bombay High Court, high-profile jurists and attorneys at law, Mayors of Mumbai, maharajas, senior national and state-level bureaucrats, captains of Indian industry, financiers, philanthropists, educationists, scientists, leaders in the Indian armed forces, some of India's best-known journalists, leaders in the medical field, cricketers, luminaries in art and culture including several major film actors and musicians.

- Anu Aga – Business executive
- Tara Deshpande, Indian actress, author, and food personality
- Teresa Albuquerque – Historian
- Ebrahim Alkazi – Theatre director
- Joachim Alva – Journalist, lawyer and politician
- Norma Alvares – Goan environmentalist; received the Padma Shri award
- Zeenat Aman – Actor
- Mukesh Ambani – Business executive
- Shabana Azmi – Actress
- Vidya Balan – Actress
- Sanjeev Bagai – Pediatric nephrologist
- Sauvik Banerjjee
- Krissann Barretto – Actress
- Neerja Bhanot – flight purser, killed saving passengers on hijacked Pan Am Flight 73. First female recipient of the Ashoka Chakra Award; recipient of awards from the Pakistan and United States governments, in recognition of her actions
- Vijay Bhatt – Film producer, director and screenwriter
- Zulfikar Ali Bhutto – Founder of Pakistan People's Party and former Prime Minister of Pakistan
- Ankiti Bose – Founder of Zilingo
- Karuna Mary Braganza – Educationist and Padma Shri awardee
- Cyrus Broacha – MTV India VJ
- Shreya Bugde – Indian comedian, actress
- Anupama Chopra – Film critic, journalist, author
- Charles Correa – Architect
- Srikant Datar – 11th Dean of Harvard Business School, commencing in 2021
- Shobhaa De – Writer
- Abdul Qavi Desnavi – Writer and linguist
- Michael Ferreira – Billiards player
- Zafar Futehally – Naturalist, conservationist
- Sunil Gavaskar – Cricketer
- Sohrab Pirojsha Godrej – Business executive and Padma Bhushan awardee
- Rafiq Hajat – Civil Rights Activist based in Malawi
- Hariharan – Playback singer, Padma Shri awardee
- Mehnaz Hoosein – Singer and songwriter
- Zakir Hussain – Musician, Padma Bhushan awardee
- Harish Iyer – Equal rights activist
- Mahalakshmi Iyer – Playback singer
- Mahesh Jethmalani – Lawyer, member of parliament
- Jagdish Joshi – Gujarati poet
- Manisha Joshi – Gujarati poet
- Ashok Kamte – Additional Commissioner of Mumbai Police, killed during the 2008 Mumbai attacks
- Anil Kapoor – Actor
- Kunaal Roy Kapur – Actor
- Aditya Roy Kapur – Actor
- Salman Khan – Actor
- Mukesh Khanna – Actor
- Kavita Krishnamurthy – Playback singer, Padma Shri awardee
- Rakesh Maria – Police Commissioner of Mumbai
- Vinod Mehra- Actor
- Zubin Mehta – Musician
- Ismail Merchant – Film producer
- Mario Miranda – Cartoonist, artist; Padma Vibhushan awardee
- Rohinton Mistry – Novelist
- Shaheen Mistri – Social activist and educator
- Shakti Mohan – Dancer
- G. T. Nanavati – Jurist
- Panna Naik – Gujarati poet
- Fali Sam Nariman – Jurist; 2002 Gruber Prize for Justice laureate
- Shaina NC – Fashion Designer and Politician
- Alyque Padamsee – Actor, filmmaker
- Quasar Thakore-Padamsee – Theatre actor, director
- Nani Palkhivala – Jurist and economist
- Meghna Pant – Author
- Smita Patil – Actress
- S. G. M. M. Peerzada – Pakistani lieutenant general, defacto Prime Minister in the military regime of President of Pakistan Yahya Khan
- Diana Penty – Model, actress
- Freida Pinto – Actress
- Zinia Pinto – Nun and teacher
- Cedric Prakash – Human rights activist
- Azim Premji – Business executive
- Fazal Rahimtoola – Politician
- Amrita Rao – Actor
- Deepak Rao – Military trainer
- Suneeta Rao – Playback singer
- Himanshu Roy – Additional Director General of Police of Maharashtra
- Bhaskar Saha – Shanti Swarup Bhatnagar laureate
- Nowroji Saklatvala – Business executive; former chairman of the Tata Group
- Ashwin Sanghi – Writer
- Rajdeep Sardesai – Journalist
- Deepti Sati – Actress, model
- Zarina Screwvala – Entrepreneur
- K. D. Sethna – Poet and historian
- Shruti Seth – Actress
- Farooq Sheikh – Actor
- Praniti Shinde – Politician, MLA for Solapur, Maharashtra
- Soli Sorabjee – Jurist
- F. N. Souza – Artist
- Tabu – Actress
- Dorabji Tata – Businessman, and a key figure in the development of the Tata Group
- Ratan Tata – Parsi financier and philanthropist
- Aaditya Thackeray – Politician serving as Cabinet Minister of Tourism and Environment for the Government of Maharashtra. He is also an MLA of Maharashtra Legislative Assembly from Worli
- Shenaz Treasurywala – Actor and VJ
- Amish Tripathi – Author
- Sucharita Tyagi – Film critic and radio jockey.
- Abbas Tyrewala – Writer, director
- Jayant B. Udgaonkar FTWAS FINAS FIAS – Molecular biologist, professor and researcher at the National Centre for Biological Sciences and Indian Institute of Science Education and Research, Pune; Shanti Swarup Bhatnagar laureate
- Pankaj Udhas – Ghazal singer
- Rini Dhumal - Painter

== See also ==
- List of Jesuit sites
- List of Jesuit educational institutions

== Cited sources ==
- Kaushik, R. P.; Kukla, A. S.; Joshi, Sneha; NAAC Peer Team (2007). Antony Stella (ed.). Assessment Report on Institutional Reaccreditation of St. Xavier's College, Mumbai, Maharashtra (Report). National Assessment and Accreditation Council (NAAC).
- St. Xavier's College Handbook (PDF). St. Xavier's College. June 2009. Archived from the original (PDF) on 1 June 2010.
