= Disperis monophylla =

Scientific classification
- Kingdom: Plantae
- Clade: Tracheophytes
- Clade: Angiosperms
- Clade: Monocots
- Order: Asparagales
- Family: Orchidaceae
- Subfamily: Orchidoideae
- Genus: Disperis
- Species: D. monophylla

Binomial name
- Disperis monophylla Blatt. ex C.E.C.Fisch.

Synonyms
- Disperis monophylla Blatt.

Species of orchid endemic to India

Disperis monophylla is a species of flowering plant in the family Orchidaceae. It is a terrestrial orchid endemic to India and is assigned to the genus Disperis, a group of orchids distributed primarily in tropical Africa and parts of Asia.

== Taxonomy ==
The species was first formally described by Ethelbert Blatter in 1928 in Cecil Ernest Claude Fischer's Flora of the Presidency of Madras.

The identity of Disperis monophylla remained unclear for many decades and it was often overlooked or confused with related species such as Disperis neilgherrensis. It has since been reinstated as a distinct species following recent taxonomic study.

== Description ==
Disperis monophylla is a small terrestrial orchid with underground tubers. It is characterised by a single leaf, typically broadly ovate to cordate in shape, from which the specific epithet monophylla (meaning "one-leaved") is derived.

The plant produces a short flowering stem bearing one to three flowers. The flowers are resupinate, greenish-white with striped markings that may become purplish with age. Floral structures include a specialised lip and spur typical of the genus, adapted for pollination.

== Distribution and habitat ==
The species is endemic to India and is known from the southern Western Ghats, particularly in Tamil Nadu and Kerala.

It grows in shaded evergreen forest habitats, typically in humus-rich soils at elevations above 1,000 m (3,300 ft). It is often associated with moist understory conditions and moss-rich environments.

== Ecology ==
Like other orchids, Disperis monophylla is likely dependent on symbiotic relationships with mycorrhizal fungi for seed germination and nutrient uptake.

Although specific pollinators have not been documented, species of Disperis are generally adapted for specialised insect pollination.

== Conservation ==
Disperis monophylla has historically been considered a rare species, having been known only from early 20th-century collections and rediscovered after several decades.

However, its current distribution and population status remain insufficiently documented, and further field studies are required to accurately assess its abundance and conservation status.
