= Venita Coelho =

Indian writer, director and artist

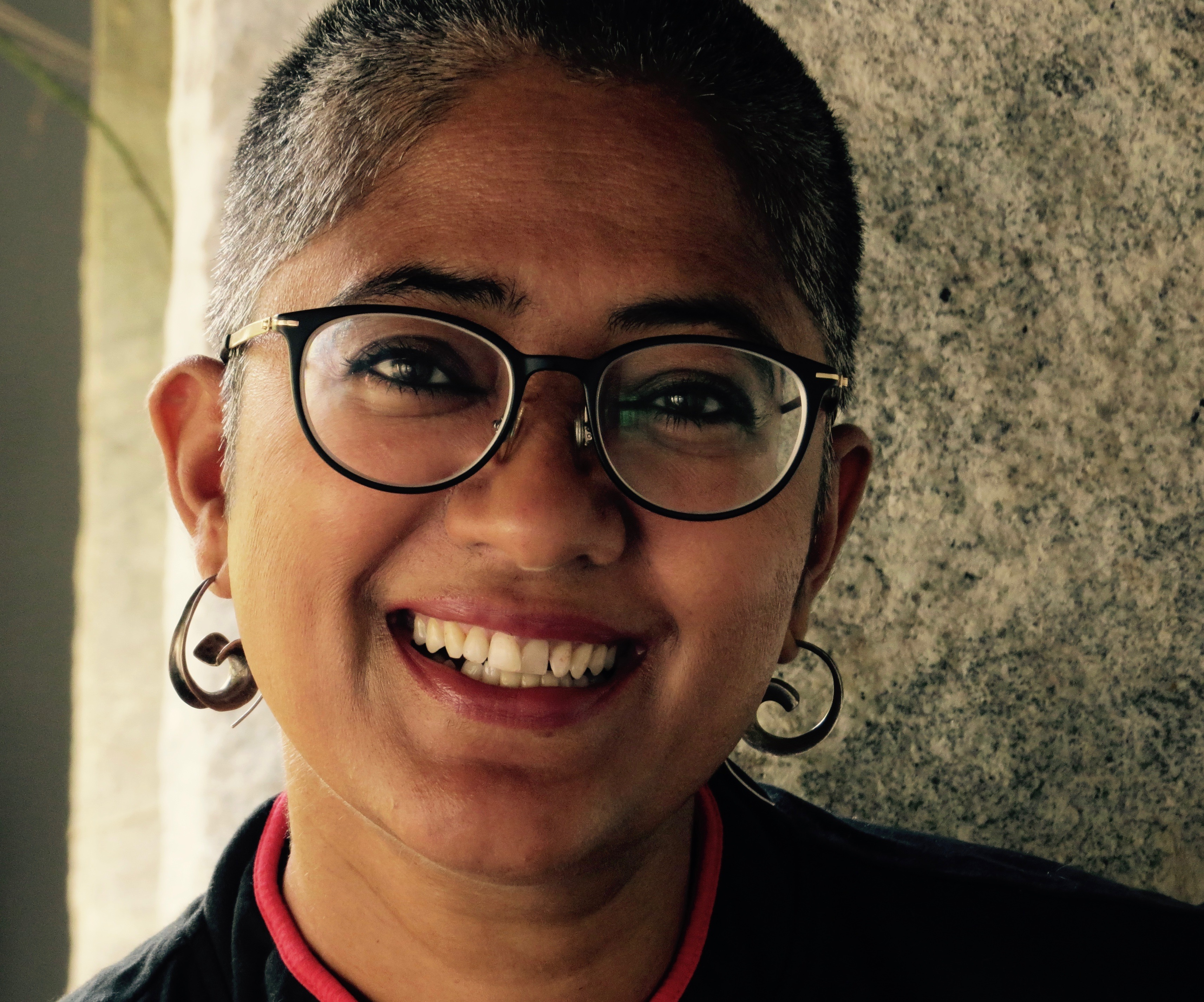
- Born: 1966 (age 59–60); Dehra Dun, undivided Uttar Pradesh (now part of Uttarakhand), India
- Education: [Loreto Day School, Dharamtala, Kolkata] St. Xavier's College, Kolkata, Sophia College for Women, Mumbai
- Occupations: Writer, director and artist
- Writing career
- Language: English
- Period: First television series written and directed by in 1987 (Head Over Heels). First book published in 2007.
- Genres: Novel, short story
- Notable works: Film, television, children's literature. Washer of the Dead and Boy No.32.
- Notable awards: The Hindu: Good Reads award for best fiction for children 2016.
- Website: facebook.com/officialvenitacoelho

Venita Coelho is an Indian writer, director and artist who lives in Goa.

== Early life and education ==
Born in Dehra Dun, Uttarakhand, Coelho grew up and was educated in Kolkata, where she attended St. Xavier's College. She moved to Mumbai (Bombay), and did her diploma in social communications media from Sophia College

== Career: media and books ==
After working in film and television, she re-located to Goa. She is the author of books including Dead As A Dodo, which won The Sahitya Akademi Bal Puruskar for 2020 and The Hindu Good Reads award for best fiction for children 2016.

== In films and TV ==
Her career in television started as an intern at UTV in Mumbai. She has since written, produced and directed shows. She has since worked at Sony Entertainment Television, Endemol India, Nimbus and Cinevistaas Ltd. Coelho has written the daily soap Trikaal and Karan Johar's adaptation of Stepmom, We are Family. She also wrote the script for Jassi Jaissi Koi Nahin in 2003.

== Works ==
- Dungeon Tales (Scholastic India)
- Tiger by the Tail (Hachette India) -- Nominated for the Neev Literary Award 2018)
- Boy No. 32 (nominated for the Neev Literary Award 2018)
- Soap! Writing and Surviving Television in India (Harper Collins India)
- Dead as Dodo (winner of The Hindu/Good Reads Award for Best Fiction for Children 2016) Winner of The "Sahitya Akademi" "Bal Puruskar" 2020
- Monkey See Monkey Do (nominated for The Hindu/Good Reads Award for the Best Fiction for Children 2017. Nominated for the Neev Literary Award 2018)
- The Washer of the Dead: A Collection of Ghost Stories, called "a ghost folklore from a feminist perspective" (Zubaan/ Penguin India). Recommended by Erica Jong as one of the ten best books on death and dying, this collection of feminist ghost stories was long listed for the Frank O'Connor award.

== In art ==
Coelho works in oils and acrylics on canvas and glass.

== Columns and the media ==
She wrote a column for The Indian Express titled "The Tale of Two Cities", and other columns for The Indian Express, The Asian Age and O Heraldo.
