= Blatter Herbarium =

Herbarium in Mumbai, India

The Blatter Herbarium (BLAT), in St. Xavier's College, Mumbai, is a major Herbarium in India. It is listed in the Index Herbariorum, published by the International Association for Plant Taxonomy and New York Botanical Garden. The Herbarium specializes in the vascular plants of western India; algae, mosses, and fungi of Mumbai; seed samples of medicinally and economically important plants of Maharashtra, and wood samples of Maharashtra. The institute holds the largest botanical collection in western India.

== History ==
The Herbarium was founded by the Jesuit priest and taxonomist, Ethelbert Blatter, SJ. It was renamed in his honour in 1941 by his associate and director of the Herbarium, Father Henry Santapau, SJ. Father Santapau went on to direct the Botanical Survey of India, and was recognized by the Indian Government with a Padmashri in 1964 for his services to Indian botany.

The two priests are regarded as pioneers in Indian plant taxonomy, and contributed over 500 scientific articles to various journals. They also wrote a number of books, like The Flora of Aden, Arabia; Beautiful Flowers of Kashmir; The Bombay Grasses; Palms of Asia; Orchids of Bombay; Medicinal and Poisonous plants of India; Flora of Khandala; Acanthaceae of Bombay, and Trees of Bombay.

The Herbarium is currently engaged in a variety of national projects, including surveys of medicinally and economically important plants of Western Maharashtra, the flora of Ratnagiri District, ethnobiology of Goa Tribals, and the trees of Mumbai.

Many scholars make use of the institute's facilities to conduct post-graduate and doctoral studies.

== Collections ==
The Herbarium contains a flowering plants collection that dates back to 1816, with over 1,50,000 specimens from all over India. It maintains type materials for about 400 plants which have been identified as new species over a period of time. It holds large alga, fungus, bryophyte, pteridophyte and gymnosperm collections. It also has obtained specimens from regions like Sindh, Arabia, Australia, Germany and Switzerland.

The institute's museum preserves wood, seed and fruit samples of plants with medicinal properties. Pickled specimens of algae, fungi and lichen are also stored in the museum.

The attached library boasts of a copy of the first book printed in India - Colóquios dos simples e drogas da India (1563) by Garcia de Orta. Besides the Hortus Malabaricus (The Gardens of Malabar) by Hendrik van Rheede from 1678, the library contains a compendium of botanical literature and Indian and international journals on botany.
