= Smriti Morarka =

Indian handwoven cloth activist

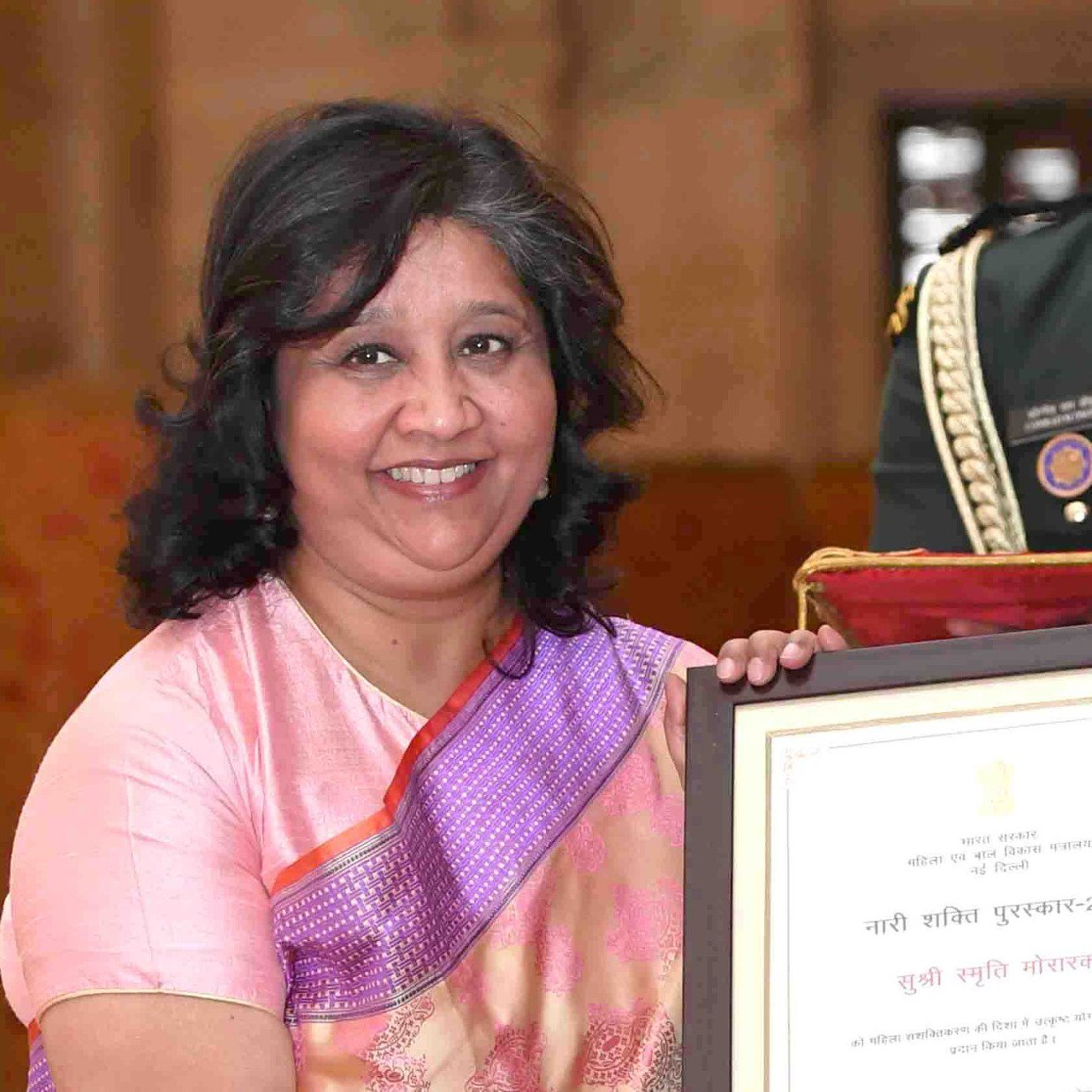
- Smriti Morarka
- Education: Sophia College for Women; Loreto College, Kolkata
- Occupation: Social activist
- Known for: Reviving handwoven cloth, advocating for mental health
- Spouse: Gautam Morarka
- Children: 2
- Awards: "Woman Power Award" Nari Shakti Puraskar (2019)

Smriti Morarka is an Indian social activist reviving handwoven cloth and improving mental health. In 2019 she was awarded the "Woman Power Award" Nari Shakti Puraskar by the President of India on International Women's Day in recognition of the example she has made.

== Life ==
Morarka was educated at Welham Girls' School, Sophia College for Women and Loreto College, Kolkata where she studied history and Political Science. Her family collected art. Her mother had created a National Institute specialising in Indology, Religion and Cultural Studies in Varanasi. She met the hand loom weavers who were finding it very difficult to find buyers for their work in Karsi.

Morarka started a brand named "Tantuvi" in 1998 with the ambition of selling their work despite the general decline in the industry. Tatruvi is a sanskrit word that means "weaver". She regarded Tantuvi as her third child and the work created by the 80-100 weavers she has working occupy six days of her week.

She realised that she would need to improve the way business was made. She knew that although the hand woven products were going to have to be expensive, but she saw that the quality was unequalled, even though the industry was "hanging on a thread". Previously the fabric had been bought very cheaply by dealers who then the work at high prices. She has built a model where the weavers get a fair share of the profits. She decided to concentrate on the creation of sarees which would sell at about 50,000 rupees.

She was given the Nari Shakti Puraskar award in 2019. The "2018" award was made in the Presidential Palace by the President of India. Prime Minister Narendra Modi was present. Morarka is a trustee of the Manotsav Foundation which is concerned with mental health.

== Private life ==
She is married to the industrialist Gautam R Morarka. They have two children.
