= Rini Dhumal =

Indian Artist and Print Maker Rini Dhumal

Rini Dhumal (16 December 1948 – 7 September 2021) was an Indian painter and printmaker known for figurative work centred on the female form, drawing on mythology, memory and the experience of Partition. She taught for nearly two decades at the Faculty of Fine Arts, Maharaja Sayajirao (M.S.) University of Baroda in Vadodara, Gujarat, eventually heading its Painting Department, and is credited with helping bring printmaking into wider recognition within Indian contemporary art..

== Early life ==
Dhumal, born Rini Dasgupta, was born on 16 December 1948 in Rangpur, then in East Bengal and now in Bangladesh, a year after the Partition of India. Journalist Anil Dharker has written that the displacement of Partition shaped the recurring sense of alienation in her later work.

== Education ==
Dhumal completed her schooling at St. Anthony's Convent, Mumbai, in 1964, and studied art and literature for a year at St. Xavier's College, Mumbai, before earning her Bachelor's and Master's degrees in painting from the Faculty of Fine Arts, M.S. University, Baroda (1966–1972), receiving the Chancellor's Gold Medal for her M.F.A. In 1973 she received a Government of India Cultural Scholarship to train under K. G. Subramanyan and Somnath Hore at Kala Bhavan, Santiniketan. In 1975 she moved to Paris on a French government scholarship, where she studied printmaking under Stanley William Hayter at Atelier 17 and worked alongside Krishna Reddy.

== Career ==
Dhumal returned to India in 1977 and joined the Faculty of Fine Arts at M.S. University as a printmaker in 1984, later heading its Painting Department; she retired from teaching in 2003. Her practice centred on the female figure — often rendered as a goddess or archetypal woman — exploring myth, memory and, in her own words, women as a "shakti image" or embodiment of strength. Her best-known body of work is the Devi series, alongside others including Shakti, Tales of the Prophetess, Rooted Landscapes and Wounds. Beyond painting and printmaking, she worked in ceramics, textiles, glass and bronze.

She exhibited widely in India — including Triveni Art Gallery and Dhoomimal Art Gallery (New Delhi), Gallery Chemould and Tao Art Gallery (Mumbai), and Gallery Sanskriti (Kolkata) — and internationally, including the 6th International British Print Biennale (1979), the Festival of India in Moscow (1987), and shows in Paris, Germany, Spain, Chile, Japan and the United States. A retrospective, Shakti, opened at the National Gallery of Modern Art, Mumbai, in May 2022, having been delayed a year by the COVID-19 pandemic and mounted posthumously following her death.

Art historian Ratan Parimoo, in a 1993 essay on the Faculty of Fine Arts published in the catalogue Trends & Images by the Centre of International Modern Art (CIMA), Calcutta, placed Dhumal among the artists of the Baroda Group, describing her at the time as a younger teacher of printmaking at the university who was also notable as a painter, citing the freedom of outline and brushwork in her figurative compositions.

== Personal life ==
Dhumal married fellow artist and printmaker Purushottam Dhumal after her return from Paris; the two were already both listed as Baroda-based printmakers, then unmarried, in a 1974 survey of the city's art scene. The couple set up a printmaking studio at their home in Vadodara. In a 2017 interview she described her life as having taken her "born in East Bengal, got married to a Maharashtrian and sketched in Vadodara". Her daughter, Radhika Dhumal, is an architect and conservator of historic buildings.

Dhumal died on 7 September 2021 in Vadodara at the age of 73.

== Publications about the artist ==
Three coffee-table books/exhibition catalogues have been published on Dhumal's work by Mapin Publishing: Rooted Landscapes – The Art of Rini Dhumal (2010), Drawn to Life – Sketchbooks of Rini Dhumal (2014), and Parallel Wings – The Art of Rini Dhumal (2020)
