= Encyclopaedia of Hindi Cinema =

- Book cover
- Editor: Gulzar; Govind Nihalani; Saibal Chatterjee
- Language: English
- Subject: Hindi cinema
- Genre: Encyclopedia; Film criticism
- Published: 26 February 2003
- Publisher: Encyclopædia Britannica, Inc., Popular Prakashan
- Publication place: India
- Media type: Print
- Pages: 659
- ISBN: 978-81-79910-66-5

The Encyclopaedia of Hindi Cinema is a 2003 film encyclopedia and criticism book that was edited by Gulzar, Saibal Chatterjee, and Govind Nihalani, detailing the history of Bollywood from silent era to sound era. The book was contributed by the former two along with Allan Amin, Salim Arif, Shoma Chatterji, Susmita Dasgupta, Veeru Devgan, Bhaskar Ghose, Arun Kaul, Amir Ullah Khan, Amit Khanna, Lata Khubchandani, Akash Khurana, Amita Malik, Ramesh Meer, Suresh Naik, Anjum Rajabali, K. S. Ramesh, Maithili Rao, Firoze Rangoonwala, Sharmishta Roy, Ratnottama Sengupta, Bhawana Somaaya, Vijay Tendulkar, and Anil Zankar.^{:xv–xx}

Dubbed as the first encyclopedia on Bollywood, the book was announced by Encyclopædia Britannica, Inc. in July 2002. According to the managing director Aalok Wadhwa, the purpose of the book was "to create exclusively Indian content that is not only informative and scholarly but also entertaining". The Encyclopaedia of Hindi Cinema, which was printed in Noida, was subsequently released by the company in association with Popular Prakashan on 26 February 2003 in Mumbai.^{:ii} A critic from The Hindu described it as an "insightful study of Bollywood"; Suresh Kohli from The Tribune called it a "wonderfully produced, expensive coffee-table book".
