= Manjiri Prabhu =

Indian author, TV producer and filmmaker (born 1964)

Dr. Manjiri Prabhu
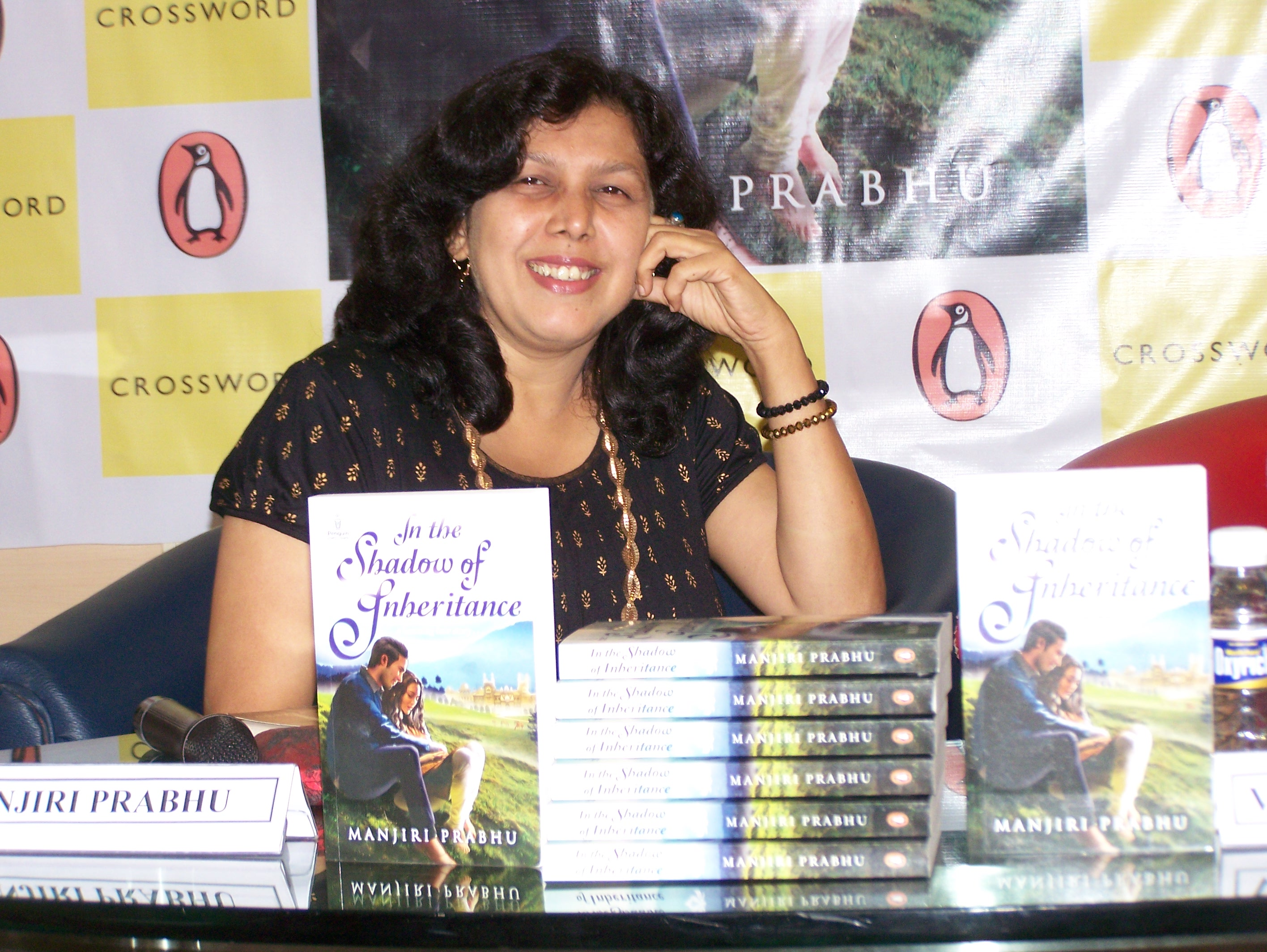
- At the launch of In the Shadow of Inheritance
- Education: Ferguson college Sophia College, Mumbai
- Occupations: Novelist, Director of Pune International Literary Festival.
- Writing career
- Genres: Mystery; Romantic suspense
- Notable works: The Cosmic Clues; The Astral Alibi; The Cavansite Conspiracy; In The Shadow of Inheritance; Rolls:Reel and Real
- Website: manjiriprabhu.in

Manjiri Prabhu (born 30 September) is an Indian author, TV producer and filmmaker. She has been hailed as the 'Desi Agatha Christie' (Indian Agatha Christie) by the media and is acknowledged as being the first woman writer of mystery fiction in India.

== Early life ==
Manjiri Atmaram Prabhu was born in Pune to Atmaram Prabhu, a businessman and Shobha Prabhu, a prominent astrologer in a family of five siblings. Manjiri started experimenting with novels at a young age and acknowledges Enid Blyton and Agatha Christie as her early inspiration. She attended St. Joseph's High School and did her graduation and Masters in French from Ferguson College and Pune University. Manjiri then completed her post graduate diploma in Social Communication Media from Sophia College, Mumbai. and PhD in Communication Science from Pune University.

== Career ==
Manjiri joined the State Institute of Educational Technology (Balchitravani) as a TV producer where she directed more than 200 infotainment programs aimed at children and young adults. During this time, her unpublished novel was adapted into a Hindi feature film titled Kuchh Dil Ne Kaha for the National Film Development Corporation of India and she wrote the script and dialogues for the same. She also produced short drama films for Filmaka and directed travelogues. Manjiri is also the founder-director of the Pune International Literary Festival and International Festival of Spiritual India.

== Bibliography ==
- Symphony of Hearts (Romantic Suspense), Rupa (1994)
- Silver in the Mist (Romantic Mystery), Rupa, (1995)
- Roles: Reel and Real (Non-fiction on Hindi films), (2001)
- The Cosmic Clues (Mystery Detective fiction), Bantam Books, (2004)
- The Astral Alibi (Mystery Detective fiction), Bantam Dell, USA, (2006), republished as Stellar Signs, Jaico, (2014)
- The Cavansite Conspiracy (Romantic Suspense Thriller), Rupa, (2011)
- The Gypsies at Noelle's Retreat - Riva Parkar Mystery series, Times Group Books, (2013)
- In the Shadow of Inheritance (Romantic Mystery Suspense), Penguin India, (2014)
- The Trail of Four (Destination Mystery Thriller), Bloomsbury India (2017)
- Revolt Of The Lamebren (Dystopian Science Fantasy), Readomania (2018)
- Voice Of The Runes (Destination Mystery Thriller), Bloomsbury India (2018)
- Mystery At Malabar Cottage (Children's Mystery), Readomania (2019)
- Flipped- Adventure Stories Children's Anthology), Story - The Treasure on Cocofarm, HarperCollins India (2019)
- The Final Act of Love (Romantic Mystery Suspense), Amazon Kindle (2020)
- The Adventures of Mithoo (Children's Fantasy), Readomania (2021)
- The DOGtrine of Peace (Non-fiction Spiritual), Readomania (2021)
- Legend of The Snow Queen (Destination Mystery Thriller) Readomania (2023)
- The Rampur Raza Mystery (A Sassy Library Thriller) NBT (2023)
- The Mystery of the Portuguese Hearts (Destination Mystery Thriller) Jaico Books (2024)

== Awards and recognition ==
- The Astral Alibi honored as 'Notable Fiction' in Kiriyama Prize (2007)
- The Cavansite Conspiracy awarded 'Best Mystery' by BTB Awards (2012)
- The Rampur Raza Mystery (A Sassy Library Thriller) NBT (2023) was launched by the Hon. President of India Smt. Droupadi Murmuji
- ‘Global Woman Leader By The 10th World Women Leadership Congress Awards’ (2023)
- 'Excellence in Service for Humanity' from the Rotary Club of Pune, Kalyani Nagar, (2022)
- 'Inspirational Women of Maharashtra -Excellence in the field of Writing’ (2017)
- ‘Most Admired Leader of Maharashtra' by ERTC Global Herald (2017)
- ‘The Rex Karmaveer Gold Medal Award’ instituted by iCONGO and the UN (2016)
