= Manisha Joshi =

Indian poet and journalist

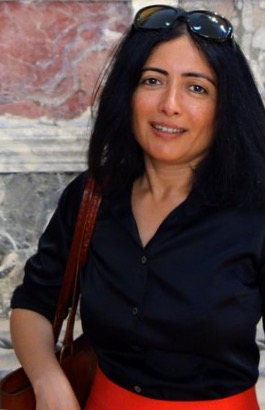
- At the Colosseum, Rome, June 2015
- Born: Manisha Laxmikant Joshi; 6 April 1971 (age 55); Godhra, Mandvi, Kutch district, Gujarat
- Education: M S University; St. Xavier's College, Mumbai
- Occupations: Poet, journalist
- Writing career
- Language: Gujarati, Kutchi
- Notable awards: Kalapi Award (2026)
- Website: manishajoshi.in

Signature
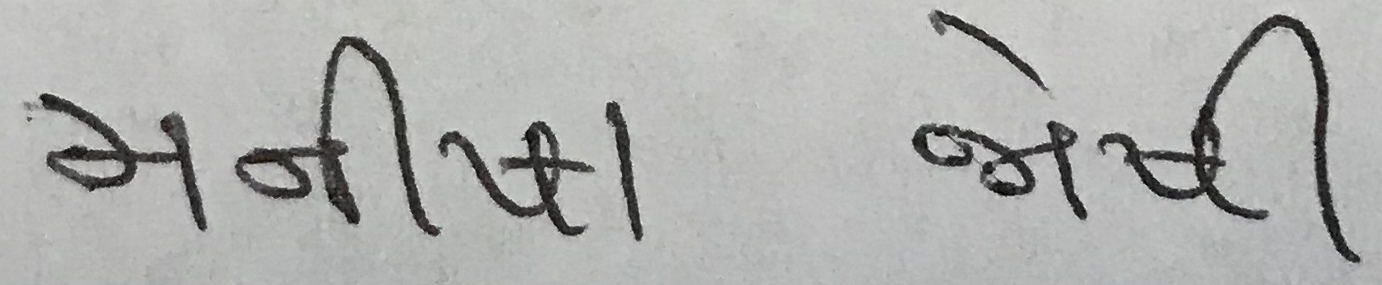

Manisha Joshi (born 6 April 1971) is an Indian Gujarati-language poet and journalist. She is the author of four poetry collections including Kandara (1996), Kansara Bazar (2001), Kandmool (2013), and Thaak (2020). She currently lives in California.

== Early life and education ==
Manisha Joshi was born on 6 April 1971 in Godhra, a small village near Mandvi in Kutch district, to Tara Joshi and Laxmikant Joshi.

After finishing her HSC at Anjar in 1989, aged 18, she began writing poetry, and moved to Vadodara to attend college, as there was no further education above 9th standard in her village. During her college years she read world literature, in particular modern literature. She completed her Bachelor of Arts and Master of Arts in English literature in 1992 and 1995 respectively at Maharaja Sayajirao University, Vadodara. She also obtained a diploma in Mass Communication from St. Xaviers College, Mumbai in 1993. While attending university she studied the books written by her college professors, including Sitanshu Yashaschandra, Ganesh Devy and Babu Suthar, and became acquainted with other Gujarati writers such as Gulam Mohammed Sheikh, Prabodh Parikh, Labhshankar Thaker, Nitin Mehta, Jaydev Shukla and Bholabhai Patel.

== Career ==
She worked as a print and television journalist in Mumbai and in London.

Her poems were published in several English and Gujarati language magazines including The Wolf, Indian Literature, New Quest, Shabdasrishti, Parab, Navneet Samarpan, Kavita, Tathapi, Sahacharya Varshiki, Etad, Samipe, Vahi and Sandhi.

Kandara (The Cave), her first collection of poems, was published in 1996 by Gujarati Sahitya Parishad with a preface by Chandrakant Topiwala. It was critically acclaimed by several Gujarati authors including Sitanshu Yashaschandra, Prabodh Parikh and Chinu Modi. Her second collection of poems Kansara Bazar (The Pots-and-Pans Bazaar) was published in 2001, followed by Kandmool in 2013. Some of her poems have been translated into English and Hindi. Her poetry is characterized by suggestive and surreal imagery. She published her fourth collection, Thaak (Fatigue), in 2020.

== Personal life ==
After marriage, she settled in the United States. Presently, she lives in Berkeley, California.

== Awards ==
Her poetry collection Kandmool received Gujarat Sahitya Akademi's 2013 first prize. She was nominated for the Sanskriti Award by Sanskriti Pratishthan in 1998 for her contribution to modern Gujarati poetry. She received the Ramesh Parekh award by Gujarati Literary Academy of North America in 2018. In 2026, she received the Kalapi Award, conferred by Indian National Theatre.

== See also ==
- List of Gujarati-language writers
