= Sophia College for Women =

College in India

- Motto: Urdhva Mula
- Motto in English: Roots Upwards
- Type: Public
- Established: 1940; 86 years ago
- Affiliations: University of Mumbai
- Religious affiliation: Roman Catholic
- Academic affiliations: Society of the Sacred Heart of Jesus
- Principal: Dr. Anagha Tendulkar (I/C)
- Location: Mumbai, Maharashtra, India; 18°58′11″N 72°48′26″E
- Website: sophiacollegemumbai.com

Sophia College (Autonomous) is an undergraduate women's college established in 1941 by Society of the Sacred Heart of Jesus. It is affiliated to the University of Mumbai. The governing body of The Society for the Higher Education of Women in India runs the college. The Religious Sisters of the Sacred Heart of Jesus and lay staff form the staff of the college. Sophia, as the name suggests, stands for Wisdom in Greek Σοφία.

== History ==
The Society of the Sacred Heart, a Roman Catholic religious order was founded in France in 1800, by St. Madeleine Sophie Barat, a young Frenchwoman. Mother Catherine Andersson from South Shields brought the Society to India in 1939.

The Sophia College campus area and the land in the vicinity belonged to the British East India Company, and was later subdivided and sold. The property changed several hands before it was acquired by the Society of the Sacred Heart in 1940 from the Maharaja of Bhavnagar. A part of the property was given to the Parsi family of Ashburner in the early 19th century. The bungalow which is now the main building was named Somerset House after Sir Henry Somerset, one of the commanders-in-chief of the Bombay Presidency. In 1882, the property was acquired by the Honourable Badruddin Tyabi. He built Somerset Annexe, the nucleus of the present science building. In 1917, Hormusji Nosherwanjee Vakeel bought the property and added the east-west wing. In 1923, the house was occupied by the Maharaja of Indore before the Maharaja of Bhavnagar bought the house in 1937. In 1939, Archbishop Thomas Roberts S. J. of Bombay invited the Sacred Heart nuns to start a women's college in Bombay and in 1940, The Society bought the property. The Home and Social Culture centre was formally opened by Archbishop Roberts and the name adopted; Mother Andersson became the first principal.

In 1941, the Arts Faculty was started. The University of Bombay granted temporary affiliation to the college for first year and intermediate classes. In 1942 the extension of affiliation was granted for Bachelor of Arts classes. In 1945, the Sophia motto, crest and colours were adopted. In 1950, the University of Bombay granted permanent affiliation to the college. In 1952, the Science Faculty was started with classes up to the Intermediate Science level. Karuna Mary Braganza, who would later receive the Indian civilian honour of the Padma Shri, took over as the Principal of the college in 1965. In 1966, the Intermediate Science course was extended into a Bachelor of Science degree. In 1970, Sophia Polytechnic was introduced. In 1975, the Junior college was introduced. In 1978, the postgraduate Diploma Course in Clinical Analysis was started. In 1993, the post graduate diploma course in Quality Assurance in the Food and Pharmaceutical Industries was introduced. At the start of the 21st century, the Sophia Centre for Women's Studies and Development and Sophia Andersson Annexe was inaugurated. Later in 2003, the Bachelor of Mass Media was introduced.

In July 2018, the University Grants Commission (UGC) granted autonomy to Sophia College for Women.

== Sophia Polytechnic ==
Sophia Polytechnic is a further education college in Mumbai, India. It is predominantly a women’s polytechnic, but male students are admitted to the courses of the Hospitality Studies (HAFT) Department as well as in the Social Communications Media (SCM) course.

=== Departments ===
Departments include Hospitality Studies (HAFT), Art and Design, Dress Designing and Garment Manufacturing, and Social Communications Media.

=== Art & Design ===
The Department of Art and Design, which is recognised by the Directorate of Art, Government of Maharashtra, conducts the following courses: Foundation Art, Diploma in Applied Art, and Diploma in Textile Designing

=== Social Communications Media ===
The Social Communications Media Department (SCM Sophia), conducts a one-year, full-time, integrated post-graduate diploma course in social communications media that is open to forty bright young women and men. The course is affiliated to the University of Mumbai’s Garware Institute of Career Education and Development. The course offers documentary film production, photography, journalism, corporate communication and advertising.

== Notable alumni ==
- Padma Shri Karuna Mary Braganza, Padma Shri for social contributions
- Karisma Kapoor, actress (dropout)
- Dhruvi Acharya, Indian Painter / Artist
- Anita Rau Badami, writer
- Rashmi Bansal, Author
- Vinita Coelho, Indian Writer, Director and Artist
- Richa Chadda, Indian actress
- Priyamvada Kant, Indian actress
- Priya Dutt, politician
- Reema Kagti, Indian film director
- Shahana Goswami, Indian actress
- Rasika Dugal, Bollywood Actress
- Smriti Morarka Awarded Woman Power Award for championing craft workers
- Nishita Nirmal Mhatre, Acting chief justice of High Court
- Manjiri Prabhu, Indian author
- Kartika Rane, Indian television
- Rana Ayyub Journalist
- Vasundhara Raje, 13th Chief Minister of Rajasthan
- Amrita Rao, Bollywood Actress
- Kiran Rao, Filmmaker
- Preetika Rao, Indian model, actress
- Shweta Salve, Indian television actress
- Hebah Patel, Indian film actress
- Leela Samson
- Priyamvada Singh, TV exec and fort restorer
- Shraddha Shashidhar, Miss Diva - 2017
- Vimi, Bollywood actress of 1960 - 70s

== See also ==
- Sophia College, Mumbai alumni
