= Malhar (festival) =

- Frequency: Annual
- Locations: St. Xavier's College, Mumbai, India
- Years active: 47
- Inaugurated: 1979
- Participants: 12,000 students and faculty from all over the world
- Website: https://malharfest.in/
- This is a College festival.

Malhar is hosted annually by the students of St. Xavier's College, Mumbai, India. The Mascot for Malhar is a frog which is called Puddles.

Malhar began in 1979. The festival includes events cultural contests in literary, performing arts and fine arts categories, along with a number of workshops on different themes.

The festival is completely managed, organized and run by the workforce which consists of 1200 volunteers and 130 people in the organizing committee. Due to Covid lockdowns, Malhar festival had to be cancelled in 2020 and was held as a one-day online event in 2021.

== Theme ==
Each year, the festival follows a specific theme.

The theme for the year 2011 was "Labyrinth" and the theme for the year 2012 was "Malhar Local", which is a play on the city of Mumbai's backbone - the railways.

The theme for Malhar 2013 was "Zara Hatke", a popular phrase that encourages people to think outside the box and try something new or in a different way.

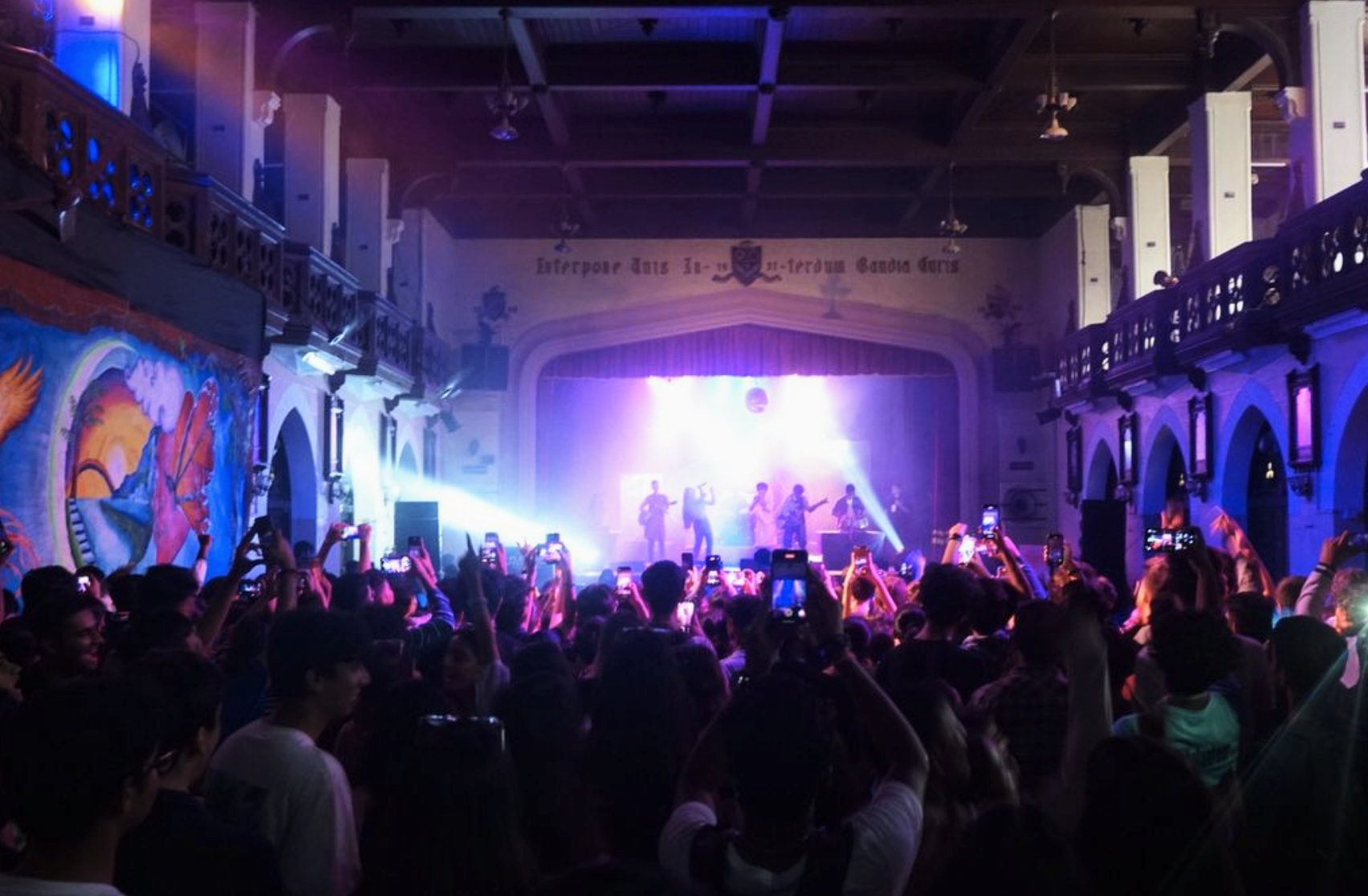
Event from Malhar Festival

You’re waking up to the same routine, day in and day out. Running the same streets, taking the same trains, trying to swallow the same thoughts. But enough is enough. You’ve done this for far too long. It’s time to stop following the herd.

You struggle through obstacles and confront the question which everybody inevitably asks. “Why?” This Malhar, we urge you to ask yourself another question. A question that could open doors, that could do away with your inhibition, and give you control. This Malhar, we urge you to ask yourself, “why not?” All it takes for change is that one idea – the one that hasn’t been done to death, the one that
doesn’t fit in – that one idea makes all the difference.

Think out-of-the-box, somersault over the boundary, stand confidently in the wings and wait for the spotlight to shine on you. This is your chance to do things the way you like, to do them differently. Take charge of your ideas. Shatter the obvious.

With a host of refreshing new events, an enthraling lineup of speakers, irresistible performances and absorbing exhibitions, celebrate the different at Malhar 2013.

The beginning of everything great is something new. Chalo, let’s be zara hatke.

For 2014 the theme was "A Renaissance", the era of revival in the new age.

In 2015, the theme of the festival is 'Malhar: A Chronicle', with an aim to serve as a perfect platform for thousands of people to voice their untold stories.

In 2016, 'Malhar: The Junction' was the theme of the festival, signifying the common point where ideas, cultures and talent meet.

The Theme for Malhar 2017 was "Upside Down - Ek Atrangi Andaaz".

The theme for Malhar 2018 was "A Time Turner".

The theme for Malhar 2019 is "The Multiverse: A Nexus of Possibilities".

The theme for year 2021 was ‘Parallax - The Legacy Re-routed’. (online one-day event due to the pandemic)

The theme for year 2022 was ‘Malhar Aurora: Transcending Horizons’ which was inspired by the Greek goddess of dawn, Aurora. Malhar 2022 aimed to be a catalyst for students who strive to soar beyond their potential.

The theme for year 2023 was 'The Eye of the Storm'

The theme for year 2024 was 'Viva La Vida: Alive with Passion'

The theme for year 2025 was 'The World Within"

In 2026, the theme was "Iridescence: The Spectrum of Expressions" celebrating the ever-changing nature of identity and expression. "Just like light refracts into different colours, every individual carries multiple perspectives, emotions, and stories that evolve through experiences and connections. It celebrates the patchwork of colourful moments that tie us together, woven with the same passion and potential, honouring the fluidity of what it means to express." The theme intends to encourage collaboration between performers, the audience, and the organisers to create "something meaningful, vibrant, and unforgettable."

-->

== Attractions ==
=== Conclave ===
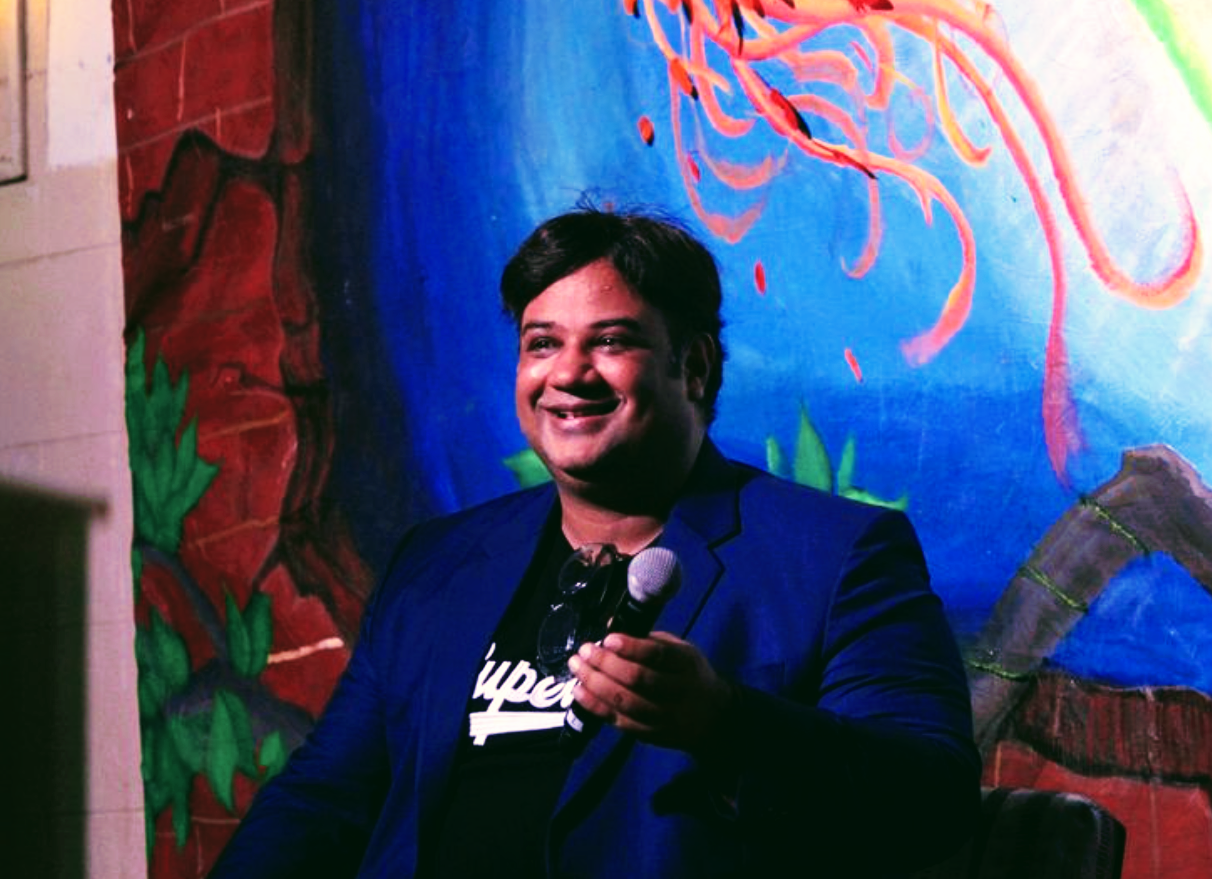
Siddhartha Paul Tiwari at Malhar Conclave

Since 2009 the first day of Malhar has traditionally been the day of Conclave, a forum for interaction between eminent personalities and students. Conclave hosts a number of plenary sessions, as well as an annual Keynote address. With an array of distinguished speakers, Malhar Conclave promotes the exchange of innovative ideas, thoughts, and disciplines as well as a forum for dialogue and debate. It has hosted people such as APJ Abdul Kalam, The 14th Dalai Lama, Siddhartha Paul Tiwari, Mani Shankar Aiyar, Raghuram Rajan and many others.

=== Band Event ===
Bands from different colleges compete to play different kinds of genres.

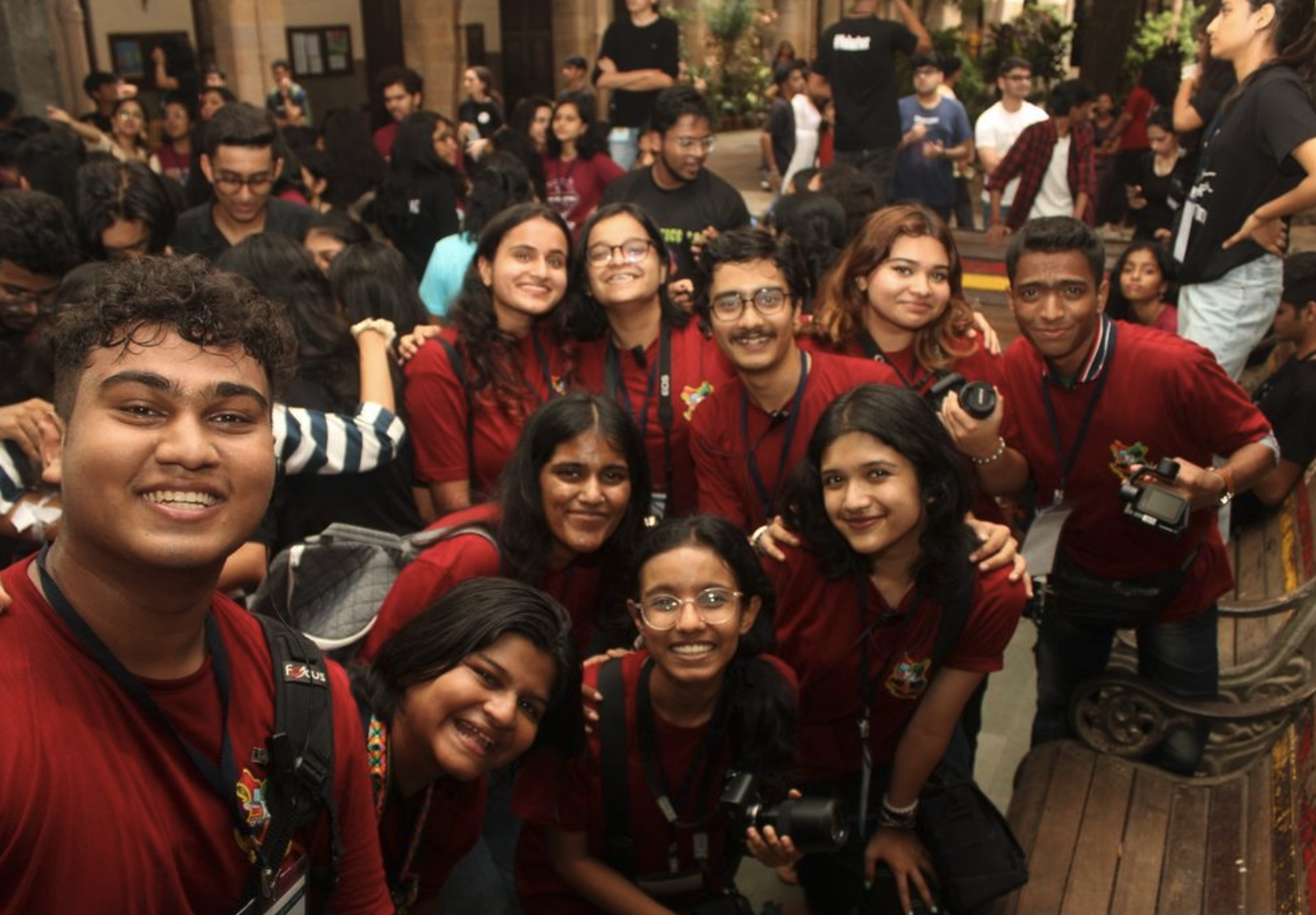
One of the teams participating in Malhar Festival

=== Social Cause ===
In addition to being a college festival that aims to entertain, Malhar is also a socially conscious festival. From cleanliness drives to tree plantations, using the Malhar platform and its numerical strength of over a thousand, the workforce tackles and promotes awareness about social issues.

=== M.O.W. ===
Malhar On Wheels is a new publicity campaign that began in 2011. Two weeks prior to Malhar, students belonging to the P.R. department go to several colleges and perform publicity gimmicks and teaser campaigns to generate interest pre-Malhar.
