= Kosbad =

Village in Maharashtra

- village
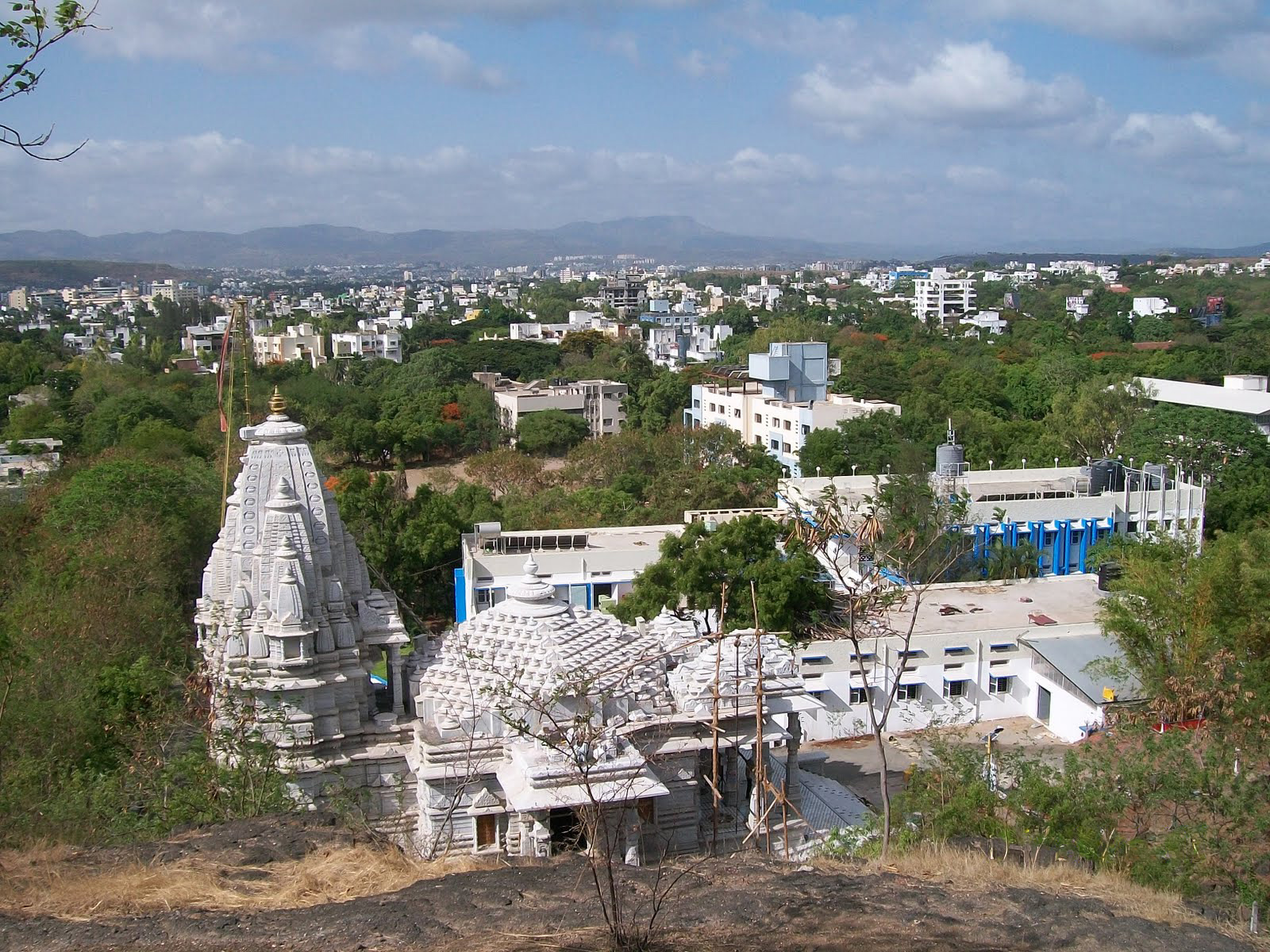
- Mallinath Jain Tirth

- Location in Maharashtra, India Kosbad (India)
- Coordinates: 20.0153961°N 72.7557095°E
- Country: India
- State: Maharashtra
- District: Palghar
- Taluka: Dahanu
- Elevation: 28 m (92 ft)

Population (2011)
  - Total: 4,479
- Time zone: UTC+5:30 (IST)
- ISO 3166 code: IN-MH
- 2011 census code: 551596

Kosbad is a village in the Palghar district of Maharashtra, India. It is located in the Dahanu taluka.

== Demographics ==
According to the 2011 census of India, Kosbad has 835 households. The effective literacy rate (i.e. the literacy rate of population excluding children aged 6 and below) is 59.12%.

Demographics (2011 Census)
	Total	Male	Female
Population	4479	2239	2240
Children aged below 6 years	609	308	301
Scheduled caste	36	17	19
Scheduled tribe	4227	2127	2100
Literates	2288	1279	1009
Workers (all)	1917	1140	777
Main workers (total)	1560	990	570
Main workers: Cultivators	99	77	22
Main workers: Agricultural labourers	756	424	332
Main workers: Household industry workers	42	26	16
Main workers: Other	663	463	200
Marginal workers (total)	357	150	207
Marginal workers: Cultivators	103	46	57
Marginal workers: Agricultural labourers	186	68	118
Marginal workers: Household industry workers	11	3	8
Marginal workers: Others	57	33	24
Non-workers	2562	1099	1463
