= Zilingo =

Ecommerce platform

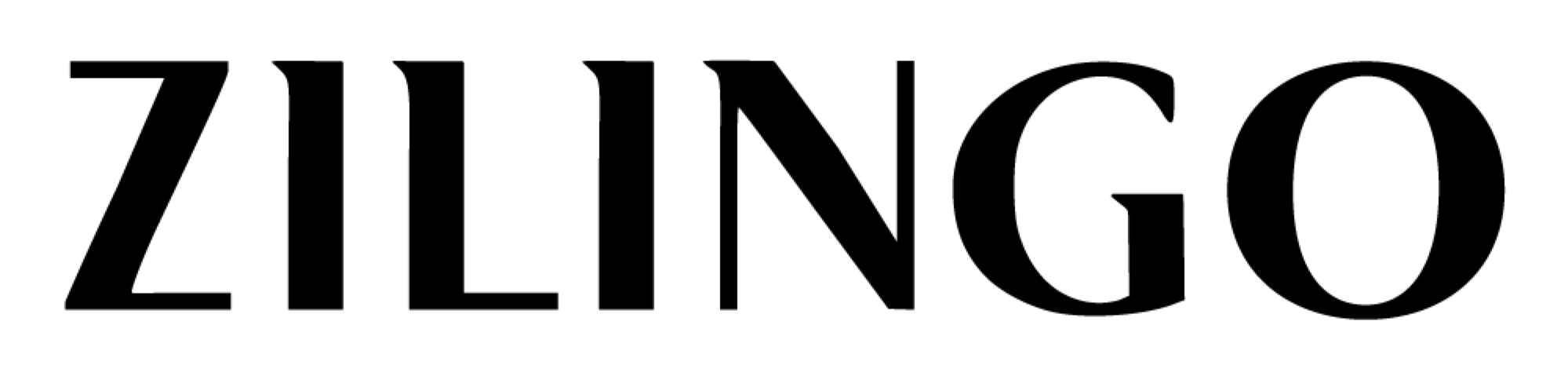
- Zilingo logo, 2019
- Type: Private
- Industry: Internet Services / Online Fashion Marketplace Services / eCommerce/ Business to Business/ Fashion Sourcing
- Founded: 2015; 11 years ago
- Founder: Ankiti Bose; Dhruv Kapoor
- Headquarters: Singapore
- Key people: Dhruv Kapoor, (Chief Technology Officer); Jim Perry, (Chief Financial Officer); Aadi Vaidya, (Chief Operating Officer); Marita Abraham, (Chief Marketing Officer) Niketh Sabbineni (Vice President) Shruti Koshy (Vice President) Peerapool Vayakornvichit (Vice President) Shushant Mantry (Vice President)
- Parent: Zilingo Pte Ltd
- Subsidiaries: Zilingo Business
- Website: http://www.zilingotrade.com/

Zilingo was an ecommerce fashion platform founded in 2015 by Ankiti Bose and Dhruv Kapoor, with operations spanning India, Singapore, Indonesia, Hong Kong, Thailand, Philippines, Australia and the United States. The company once valued at close to one billion dollars ceased operations in 2022 amidst scandal and mismanagement. It sold its tech assets to Swiss firm Buyogo in January 2023. It entered liquidation in February 2023 with sources indicating there was nothing left to be recovered. Lawsuits related to the implosion of the business remain ongoing.

== History ==
=== Founding and growth ===
Zilingo, a play on the word "zillion", was established in 2015 by two founders of Indian origin, Ankiti Bose and Dhruv Kapoor. The idea came from when Bose was on holiday in Bangkok and noticed that many of the small and medium-sized shops had no online presence.

It began with seed funding from Sequoia India and raised an additional $8 million in a Series A funding round in September 2016. It raised an additional $18 million in 2017 in a Series B round and $54 million in a Series C round in 2018.

The company started off as a B2C long-tail fashion marketplace leveraging Southeast Asia's growing internet connectivity to bring small merchants from the street markets of Bangkok and Jakarta into the e-commerce fold.

Zilingo later expanded focus towards B2B opportunities. This included products designed to help merchants and manufacturers manage their e-commerce business including inventory management, sales tracking, financing, sourcing procurement, and a ‘style hunter’ for identifying upcoming fashion trends.

Expansion efforts led the company to be valued at nearly one billion dollars by 2019. Their fashion platform took a cut whenever it was used to broker a deal or make a sale, as part of the company vision of making the fashion supply chain a levelled playing field.

In September 2017, Zilingo was shipping to eight countries and had added 5,000 new merchants in the previous twelve months. By September 2019 the company was generating 80% of its revenue from B2B operations.

In 2019, the company raised $226 million in a Series D round from existing investors Sequoia India, Burda Capital, Sofina with Singapore's sovereign fund Temasek Holdings joining the tech-platform's capital table. The latest round took the tech-platform to US$308 million from investors, making it one of Southeast Asia's highest capitalised startups.

The company closed its US and Australia offices in 2020, to focus on business in Asia. In July 2020, a second round of terminations was carried out in Thailand, India, and Indonesia offices, with an estimated additional 12% of employees being laid off globally. CFO James Perry resigned following the rounds of downsizing.

=== Dismissal of CEO ===
On March 30 whistleblowers approached the Zilingo board reporting a series of unexplained payments approved by Ankiti Bose to companies with no connection to Zilingo operations. On 31 March 2022, Bose was suspended as CEO. On 20 May 2022 Bose was fired from Zilingo after independent forensics firm investigated the financial irregularities.

=== Management buyout ===
On 20 June 2022, the cofounders of Zilingo, Dhruv Kapoor and Ankiti Bose, sent a proposal to the board for a management buyout (MBO), making a last ditch effort to buy the embattled fashion platform.

=== Lawsuits ===
In April 2024 Bose filed a $100 million defamation lawsuit against investor Mahesh Murthy for an article he wrote in Outlook Business magazine. In April 2024, she accused Dhruv Kapoor (co-founder) and Aadi Vaidya (ex-COO) of fraud, criminal intimidation and sexual harassment.

In April 2021, one of Zilingo's primary investor citing "significant financial regularities" indicated an intent to sue Bose, while in May 2024 Bose filed a further defamation lawsuit against Kapoor and Vaidya.

== Technology and commerce ==
Zilingo started off as a mobile-first eCommerce marketplace and expanded into a B2B tech-platform. Their seller management platform offered small retailers and longtail brands online distribution, inventory management tools and APIs for logistics.

Their seller management tool became profitable by 2018, offering financial services, a “style hunter", product sourcing, and content / photography services. Zilingo's customer base expanded to include fashion sellers, SMEs, Southeast Asian brands and B2B businesses.

Zilingo's tech assets were sold to Swiss firm Buyogo in January 2023.
