= Ethelbert Blatter =

Swiss Jesuit priest and botanist in British India (1877-1934)

- Born: 15 December 1877; Appenzell Innerrhoden, Switzerland
- Died: 26 May 1934 (aged 56); St. Vincent's High School, Pune, British India
- Known for: Pioneering botanist in British India
- Awards: Johannes Bruehl Memorial Medal (1932)
- Scientific career
- Fields: Botany
- Institutions: St Xavier's College, Bombay
- Author abbrev. (botany): Blatter

Ethelbert Blatter, SJ pioneering taxonomist of the flora of the Indian subcontinent.

Ethelbert Blatter (15 December 1877 – 26 May 1934) was a Swiss Jesuit priest and pioneering botanist in British India. Author of five books and over sixty papers on the flora of the Indian subcontinent, he was Principal and Professor of Botany at St Xavier College, Bombay and vice-president of the Bombay Natural History Society. In 1932 he became the first recipient of the Johannes Bruehl Memorial Medal of the Asiatic Society of Bengal.

== Early life ==
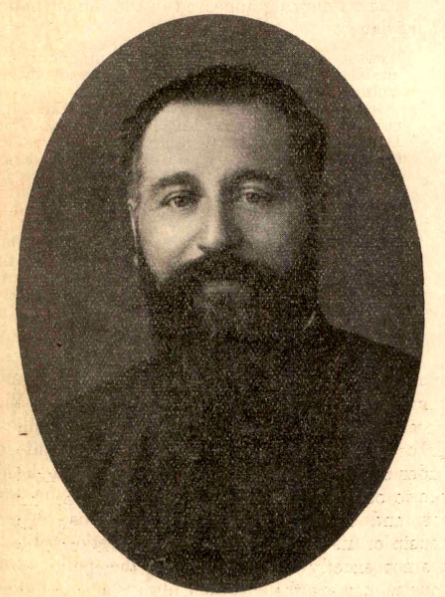

Blatter was born in the canton of Appenzell Innerrhoden in northeastern Switzerland in a region near Mount Säntis. Having lost his father at an early age, he was raised by an uncle, a popular doctor in the municipality of Rebstein in the neighboring Canton of St. Gallen. The young Blatter lived in his uncle's home, a castle overlooking Rebstein and located in the Rhine valley just before the river's union with Lake Constance (Bodensee). After finishing elementary education in Rebstein, Blatter attended middle school in Sarnen, the capital of the Canton of Obwalden, in Central Switzerland. His classmates at Sarnen remembered him as not only brilliant in every subject, but also a high-spirited companion with a reputation for pranks. After Sarnen, Blatter went on to have a brilliant career in high school in Schwyz, capital of the Canton of Schwyz, northeast of the canton of Obwalden. In October 1896, after finishing high school, Blatter moved to the border town of Feldkirch, Austria to join the Noviciate of the German Province of the Society of Jesus. Since German Jesuits were in exile under Bismarck, Blatter moved to the Netherlands in 1898 to first pursue classical studies and then study philosophy in the college of Valkenburg aan de Geul in the southernmost province of Limburg. Around this time, he also developed an interest in botany and attended many scientific conferences in Europe.

== India I ==
In 1903, Blatter moved to India and was appointed Professor of Botany at St Xavier's College Bombay. The following year, he joined the Bombay Natural History Society (BNHS) and began to contribute articles, the first of which was "The Fauna and Flora of Our Metallic Money," an article which (somewhat humorously) catalogued the microorganisms commonly found on various coins in India. In pursuit of his researches, Blatter traveled extensively within India. His most important contributions from this time were a series of articles written between 1904 and 1909 (although published later) and titled, The Palms of British India and Ceylon, Indigenous and Introduced. The articles were subsequently published in book form by Oxford University Press.

== Theological studies in Europe ==
Returning to Europe in 1909, Blatter chose to complete his theological studies in Hastings, South East England, where exiled Jesuits from two French provinces had opened a school of theology. During this time, Blatter also spent much time researching and compiling his papers, Flora of Aden, at the Royal Botanic Gardens in Kew. Ordained as a priest on 25 August 1912, Blatter spent another year in the Netherlands, before returning to London to compile data for his next effort, Flora Arabica. Still in London when Great War broke out, Blatter booked his passage to India on a Japanese boat. Despite facing rifle fire from Turkish soldiers in the Suez Canal, the ship's journey was mostly uneventful, and Blatter arrived in Bombay in October 1915.

== India II ==
Returning to his position as professor of botany at St Xavier's, Blatter expended great energy during the next few years both traveling and building an extensive botanical collection. Consequently, St. Xavier's College had one of the best herbaria in Western India during those years. He was appointed principal of the college in 1919, retaining his professorial chair until 1924. He also became a prominent member of Bombay University Senate, and played a major role in influencing later university reforms.

In 1925 Blatter retired to Panchgani as parish priest, and began to focus more on his botanical studies. His series of papers with W.S. Millard titled, Some Beautiful Indian Trees were published around this time. These papers too resulted in a book of the same name, a classic, still in print. Other books pertaining to India from this time were the two-volume Beautiful Flowers of Kashmir (1927, 1928); The Flora of the Indus Delta (with Charles McCann and T. S. Sabnis, 1929); and The Ferns of Bombay (with J. F. D'Almeida, 1932). The following year he was elected vice-president of BNHS.

In 1930, during an expedition to Waziristan, a political agency in the North-West Frontier Province of British India, Blatter had a bad fall from a horse, and the resulting injuries brought on a partial paralysis. From that point onwards, his health began to fail. In 1932. in recognition of his botanical work, Fr. Blatter received the first Johannes Bruehl Memorial Medal of the Asiatic Society of Bengal for "Conspicuous Important contributions to the knowledge of Asiatic Botany."

Fr. Ethelbert Blatter died on 26 May 1934 at St. Vincent's High School, Pune.

== Selected publications ==
- Blatter, Ethelbert; Millard, Walter Samuel (1954) [1937]. Some Beautiful Indian Trees (2nd ed.). Bombay Natural History Society. ISBN 978-0195621624.

== See also ==
- Bombay Natural History Society
- Walter Samuel Millard
- Blatter Herbarium
