= Pune International Literary Festival =

The Pune International Literary Festival is an annual literary festival held in Pune, Maharashtra. It was founded in 2013 and is one of the top eight literary festivals in India. In 2017, attendance at the festival reached 15,000 people. Since 2016, an international organisation Salzburg Global has been partnering with the festival.

The Pune International Literary Festival is a three-day festival celebrating writers from different parts of Maharashtra and the rest of India. There are panel discussions and book launches and readers and attendees can meet authors. In 2018, there were 170 speakers in five different halls on the campus.

This festival usually takes place at the Yashwantrao Chavan Academy of Development Administration, a training institute of the Maharashtra government.

In 2018, writer and columnist Shobha De opened the festival. The theme in 2018 was "Family: The Core of Society". In 2017, the festival was opened by Ustad Amjad Ali Khan. In 2019, the seventh edition of the festival focussed on climate change. The social theme was "Save our Earth." Javed Akhtar opened the festival on 20 September 2019.

== Festival director ==
Dr. Manjiri Prabhu, an author and film-maker is the director of the festival. It was founded by her and she has been the director since then.
