= Journal of the Bombay Natural History Society =

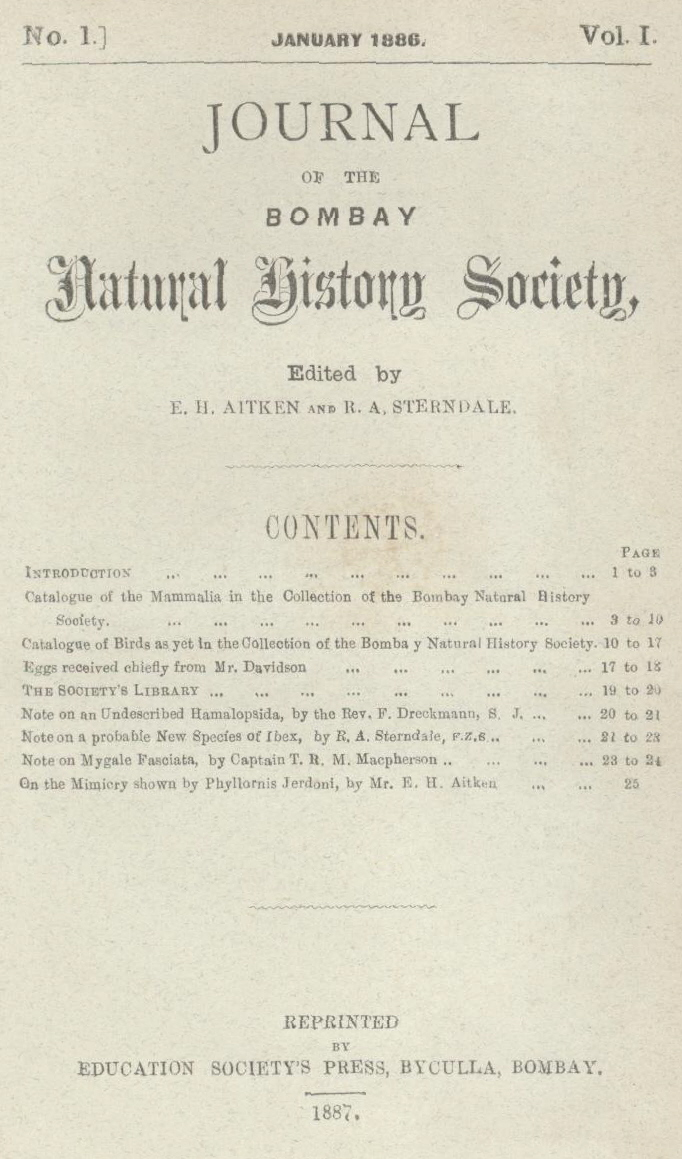
- Discipline: Natural history
- Language: English

Publication details
- History: 1886–present
- Publisher: Bombay Natural History Society (India)

Standard abbreviations
- ISO 4: J. Bombay Nat. Hist. Soc.

Indexing
- ISSN: 0006-6982
- LCCN: 48032581
- OCLC no.: 1536710

Links
- Journal homepage

The Journal of the Bombay Natural History Society (also JBNHS) is a natural history journal published several times a year by the Bombay Natural History Society. First published in January 1886, and published with only a few interruptions since, the JBNHS is one of the best-known journals in the fields of natural history, conservation, and biodiversity research.

== Major editors: 1886–1985 ==
Format: decade. major editor(s). (For more details, see Pittie 2003.)

- 1886–1895: R. A. Sterndale, E. H. Aitken, & H. M. Phipson
- 1896–1905: H. M. Phipson & W. S. Millard
- 1906–1915: W. S. Millard, R. A. Spence & N. B. Kinnear
- 1916–1925: W. S. Millard, R. A. Spence, N. B. Kinnear, & S. H. Prater
- 1926–1935: R. A. Spence, S. H. Prater, P. M. D. Sanderson, & Sálim Ali.
- 1936–1945: M. J. Dickins, P. M. D. Sanderson, S. H. Prater, C. McCann, H. M. McGusty & J. F. Caius.
- 1946–1955: S. H. Prater, C. McCann, Sálim Ali, S. B. Setna, & H. Santapau.
- 1956–1965: Sálim Ali, H. Santapau, H. Abdulali, & Z. Futehally.
- 1966–1975: H. Santapau, D. E. Reuben, Z. Futehally, J. C. Daniel, & P. V. Bole.
- 1976–1985. J. C. Daniel, P. V. Bole & A. N. D. Nanavati.

== Illustrations ==
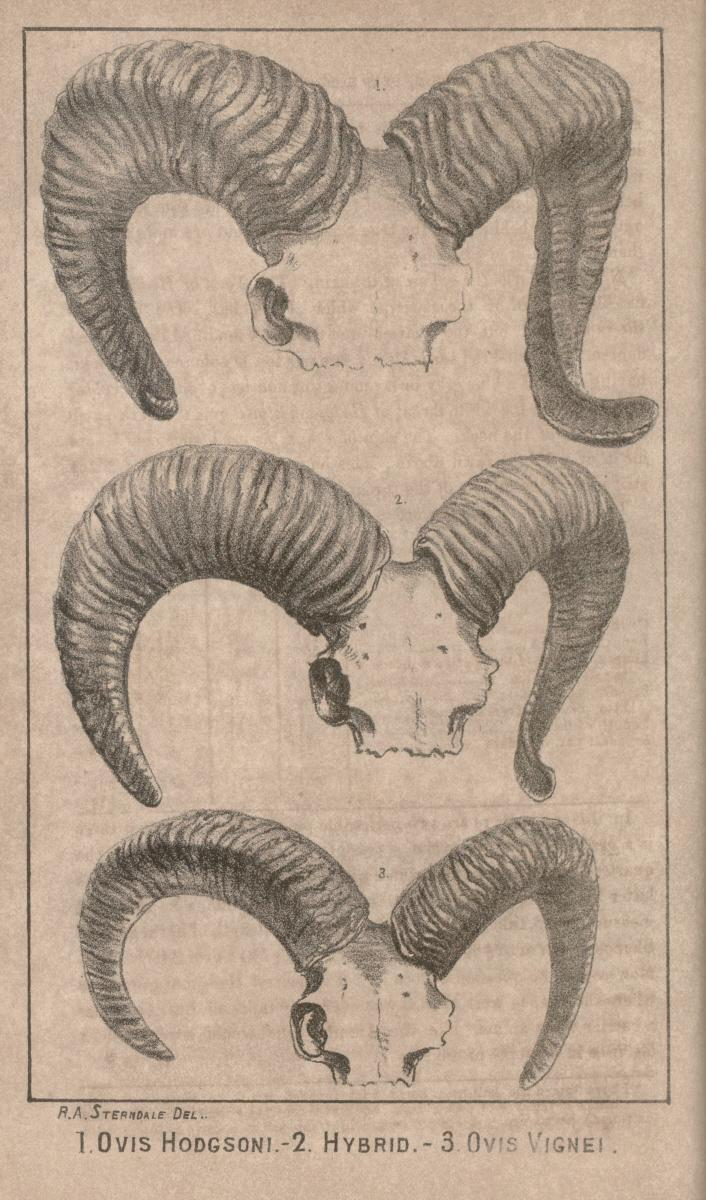
The first illustration, vol. 1, no. 1, 1886, of the horns of the sheep, Ovis hodgsoni, O. vignei, and of an hybrid found in the Zanskar region of the upper Indus river valley, drawn by R. A. Sterndale

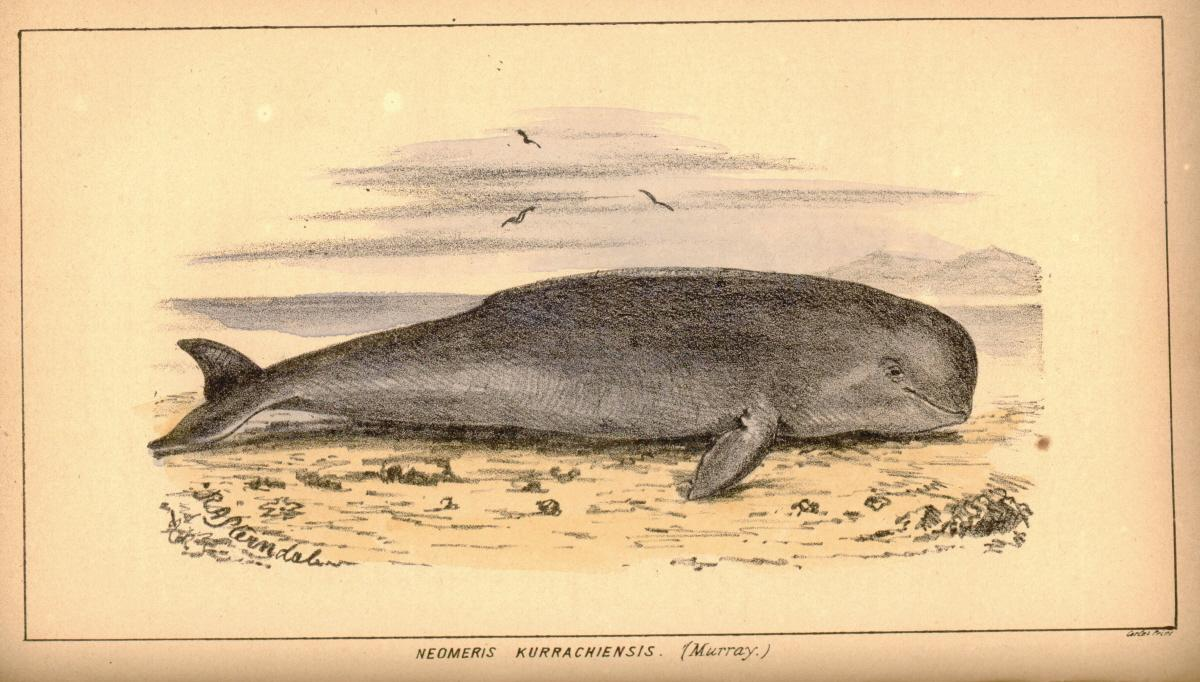
First partial colour illustration, vol. 1, no. 1, 1886, of the finless porpoise, subspecies Neomeris kurrachiensis

First photograph, vol. 3, no. 2, 1888, of a black rock scorpion (Buthus afer) displaying simultaneous twin parturition

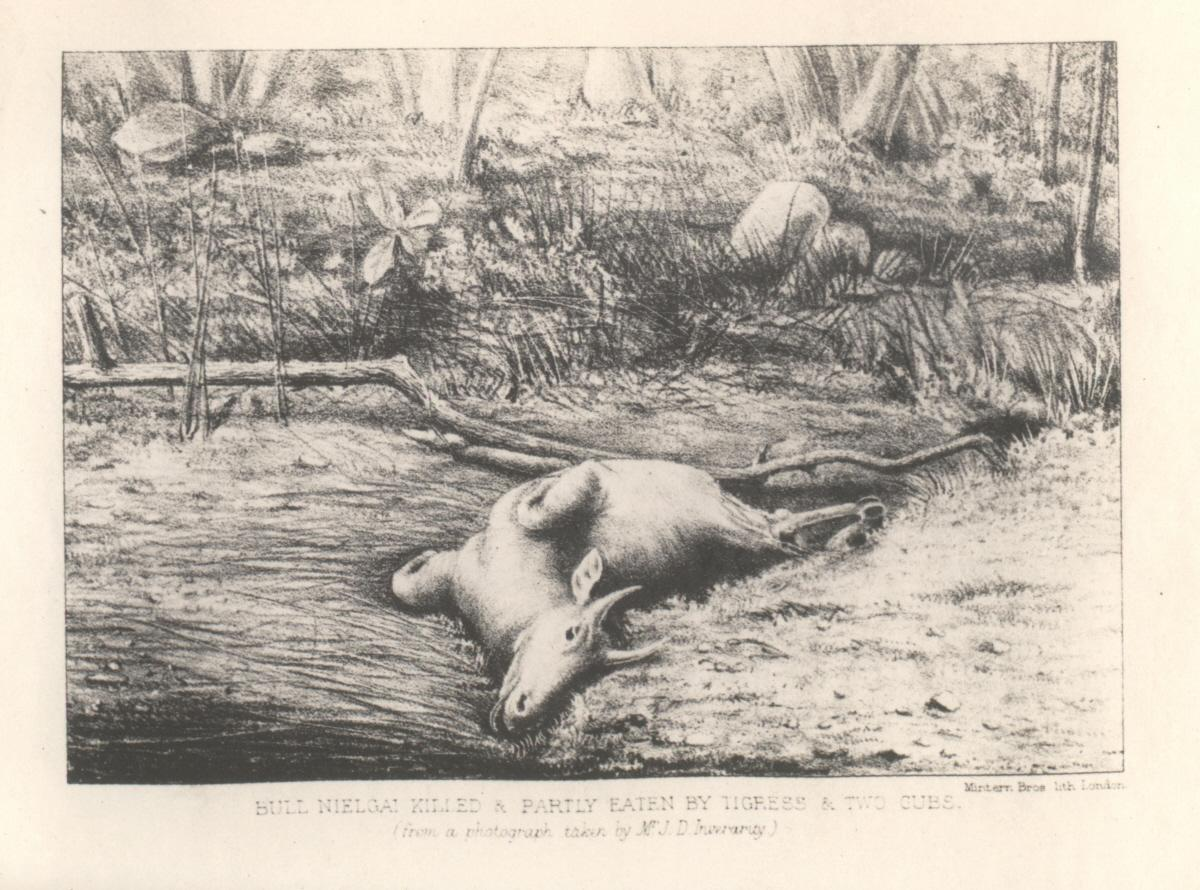
First lithograph, vol. 3, no. 2, 1888, showing remains of a partially eaten tiger kill (nilgai)
