= Kirtikar =

Kirtikar is an Indian surname. Notable people with the surname include:

- Gajanan Kirtikar (born 1943), Indian politician
- Kanhoba Ranchoddas Kirtikar (1849–1917), botanist and Army surgeon
