= Kanhoba Ranchoddas Kirtikar =

Army surgeon, writer, botanist

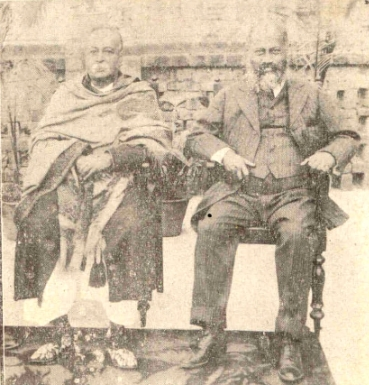
Kirtikar and B.D. Basu c. 1917

Lieutenant-Colonel Kanhoba Ranchoddas Kirtikar FLS IMS (24 May 1849 – 9 May 1917) was an army surgeon in British India and an amateur botanist. An early Indian member of the Bombay Natural History Society he had a special interest in medicinal plants, he published many papers on botany and a major work on Indian medicinal plants was posthumously published by his colleague Major B.D. Basu. He illustrated many of the plates in the book. He also wrote many books on Medical sciences in English and Marathi. Besides being a surgeon and botanist, he wrote Marathi poetry and held strong conservative Hindu views.

== Life and work ==
Kirtikar was born in Bombay and studied at the Grant Medical College before travelling to England in 1874 where he became a Member of the Royal College of Surgeons in 1876. He joined the Indian Medical Service at a time when it had few Indians and served in the 19th Native Infantry at Solapur and saw action in the Afghan War (1878-1880) and was awarded for gallant behaviour in the Battle of Maiwand. He then became a Civil Surgeon at Solapur 1898, and Thane from 1881. He also served as 2nd Surgeon at the JJ Hospital and as Professor of Anatomy, Botany and Materia Medica at the Grant Medical College around 1886. He was made Fellow of the Bombay University in 1897 and served as Health Officer for Bombay. He was a contemporary and protege of Dr Sakharam Arjun at the Grant Medical College but during the famous case of Rukhmabai, step-daughter of Dr Arjun, Kirtikar became a hostile witness in court and supported Dadaji Bhikaji, the groom of Rukhmabai. In 1902 he was promoted to Brigade Surgeon-Lieut.Colonel. He retired in 1904. He took an interest in social and literary pursuits apart from science. He was a member of the Anthropological Society of Bombay, the Bombay Natural History Society and served as a Trustee of the Aryan Education Institute and as director of the Deccan Education Society and published several non-botanical works including poetry titled Indirakavya, Bhakti Sudha, and Vilaplahiri. He was also a member of the Masonic lodge of western India from 1886.

He took an interest in fungi, cryptogams and algae that grow in hot-water springs at Bhiwandi. He also made microscopic observations on pollen. In 1896 he made a trip to Australia and wrote an article on his experiences in the Journal of the Bombay Natural History Society. Kirtikar wrote a series on the poisonous plants of Bombay and was working on medicinal plants. He also wrote on plant-lore from India. In January 1917 Kirtikar began to suffer from phthisis and became bedridden. His work on medicinal plants was published only after his death through the work of his friend and colleague Major Baman Das Basu (1867-1930) in 1918. Kirtikar had been a family guest of B.D. Basu and his brother Srisa Chandra Basu at Allahabad in 1914 and had been so impressed by their library that in his will, he left his own books for Dr B.D. Basu who added them to the Bhuvaneshwari Ashram Library. A second edition was published in 1935 and this was largely rewritten by Ethelbert Blatter, J.F. Caius and K.S. Mhaskar. In 1920, Major Basu gifted the botany related materials to Calcutta University and suggested that they maintain a Kirtikar Herbarium.
