= Phipson =

Phipson is an English surname. People with the surname Phipson include:

- Herbert Musgrave Phipson (1850–1936), British wine merchant and naturalist
- Joan Phipson (1912–2003), Australian children's writer
- Richard Phipson (1827–1884), English diocesan architect
