= Norman Boyd Kinnear =

Scottish zoologist and ornithologist (1882–1957)

Sir Norman Boyd Kinnear CB
- Born: 11 August 1882
- Died: 11 August 1957 (aged 75); Wimbledon, London
- Education: Trinity College, Glenalmond
- Known for: Drafting of the Protection of Birds Act of 1954
- Spouse: Gwendolen Beatrice Millard
- Relatives: Sir William Jardine, 7th Baronet (great-grandfather)
- Scientific career
- Fields: Zoology, ornithology
- Workplaces: Royal Scottish Museum; museum of the Bombay Natural History Society; Natural History Museum, London
- Author abbrev. (zoology): Kinnear

Sir Norman Boyd Kinnear CB (11 August 1882 – 11 August 1957) was a Scottish zoologist and ornithologist.

== Early life ==
Kinnear was the younger son of wealthy Edinburgh architect Charles George Hood Kinnear and his wife, Jessie Jane, and came from the same banking family (Thomas Kinnear & Company) as Sir William Jardine (Kinnear's great-grandfather).

Kinnear studied at Edinburgh Academy before moving to Trinity College, Glenalmond. He worked as an assistant in an estate in Lanarkshire before he followed his interest in natural history and volunteered at the Royal Scottish Museum with W. Eagle Clarke in 1905–1907. He joined Eagle Clarke to Fair Isle. In 1907, he went aboard a whaling ship around Greenland to collect bird specimens.

== Career ==
On a recommendation by William Eagle Clarke, he went to India to become curator of the museum of the Bombay Natural History Society (BNHS), a position he held from 1 November 1907 to November 1919. He was also assistant editor of the Journal of the Bombay Natural History Society.

In 1913, he married Gwendolen Beatrice Millard, daughter of Edinburgh physician William Wright Millard, a relative of Walter Samuel Millard at the BNHS.

He helped the BNHS organize its survey of Indian mammals which were begun around 1911. When the First World War broke out, he attempted to join the Indian army. He served briefly in the Bombay volunteer rifles and as an intelligence officer in the defense of Bombay port between 1915 and 1919.

During this time, he prepared a booklet on the animals of Mesopotamia.

== Natural History Museum ==
In 1920 he returned to Britain and became an assistant in the Department of Zoology at the Natural History Museum, becoming Keeper of Zoology in 1945.

Aged 65 in August 1947, then the normal age of retirement, the trustees decided to appoint Kinnear as director of the museum. He was appointed a CB in 1948. He retired on 30 April 1950 and was knighted in June of that year.

== Board memberships and other activities ==
Kinnear was editor of the Bulletin of the British Ornithologists' Club from 1925 to 1930 and president of the British Ornithologists' Union (which he joined when he was 20) from 1943 to 1948. He was a member of the International Council for Bird Preservation from 1935 and was involved in the drafting of the Protection of Birds Act of 1954. He served on the Councils of the National Trust and the Zoological Society. He was a fellow of the Linnean Society of London. He had a great interest in the writings of the naturalists on the voyages of James Cook. Kinnear was one of the founders of the Society for the History of Natural History. He wrote two papers in the Journal of the Bombay Natural History Society on the history of Indian ornithology and mammalology. He edited editions of the Popular Handbook of Indian Birds written by Hugh Whistler after the death of its author.

== Death ==
He died on his 75th birthday at his home on Burghey Road, Wimbledon.
