= James A. Murray (zoologist) =

British zoologist, taxidermist and museum curator

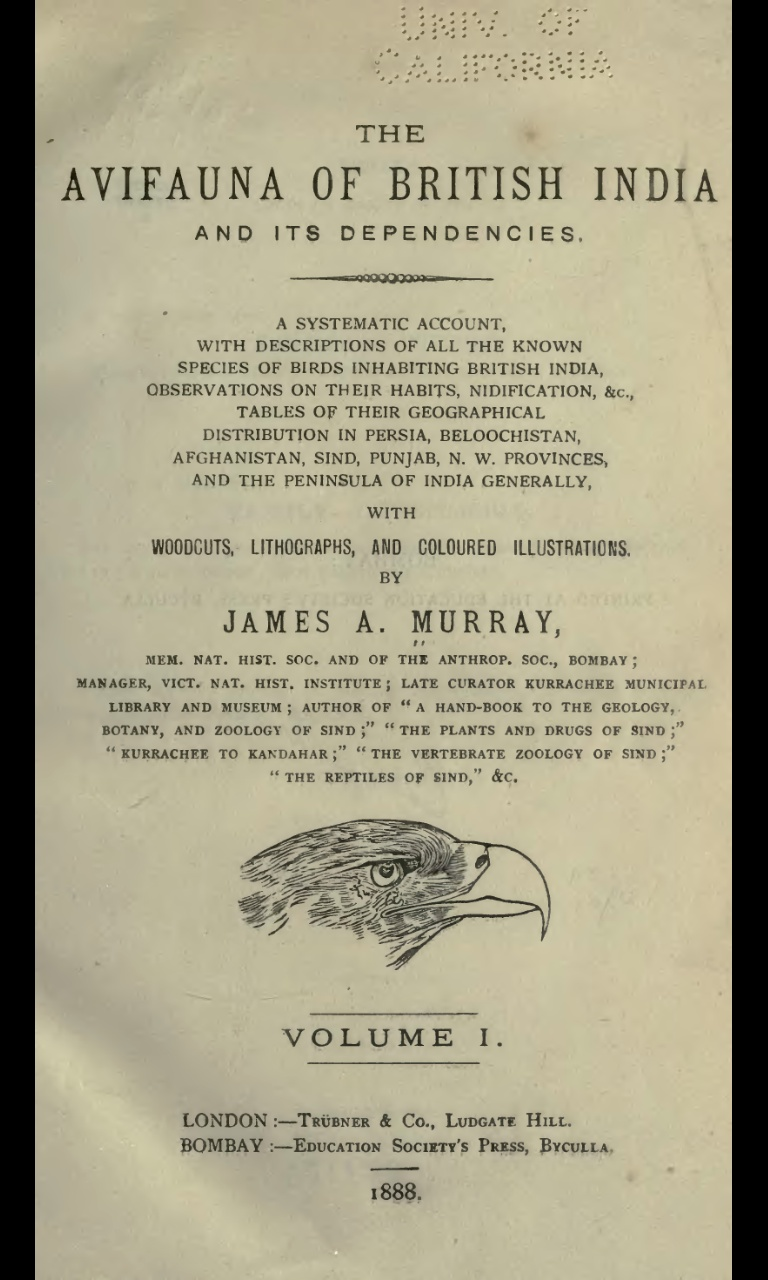
Title page of The Avifauna of British India and its Dependencies

James Alexander Murray (18 September 1841 – after 1893) was a British zoologist, taxidermist, and museum curator in Karachi. He published several books including one on the edible birds of India and founded the Victoria Natural History Institute at Bombay but went bankrupt, was imprisoned, and died in obscurity.

Not to be confused with James Alexander Murray (1873-1950), another British biologist and pathologist.

== Life and work ==
Murray, described as a "Eurasian" was born in 1841 in Tanna, (he later claimed to be a resident of Perth, Scotland) in the state of Maharashtra, India and resided in Byculla, Bombay. He was briefly a Member of the Bombay Natural History Society and Anthropological Society of Bombay, a manager at the Victoria Natural History Institute (around 1886-88, Murray also produced a periodical called Indian Annals and Magazine of Natural Science (from 1886) and branches of the Victoria Natural History Institute were begun in Mysore and Bangalore around 1892 and a report of the Bangalore Museum reported that they were hoping for good taxidermy services at a reasonable price from the organization) and curator at the Kurrachee Municipal Library and Museum. While at Karachi he had sold off duplicate volumes from the library for which he was tried and acquitted. He then moved to Bombay in 1887 to establish a private natural history concern hoping to prepare and stuff specimens for sale. He advertised the society with the appearance of being associated with the British Museum and with connections to several governments and wealthy patrons. He had obtained sums of 1500 to 2000 rupees from nearly seventy persons, offering them positions in branches across the country. He paid salaries of Rs 50 or 60 for a few months and no complaints were made for a period. He then found himself unable to maintain an office and a case of swindling was registered against him. In April 1893, he was charged with cheating two Indians, Narain Abba Subia and C. Ruggonath Chetty of Rs 1500 each and sentenced to five years of rigorous imprisonment by Justice L.H. Bayley. Witnesses in the case included H.M. Phipson who noted that he had given personal loans to Murray and had had his name removed from the list of subscribers of the Bombay Natural History Society for failure to pay subscription fees.

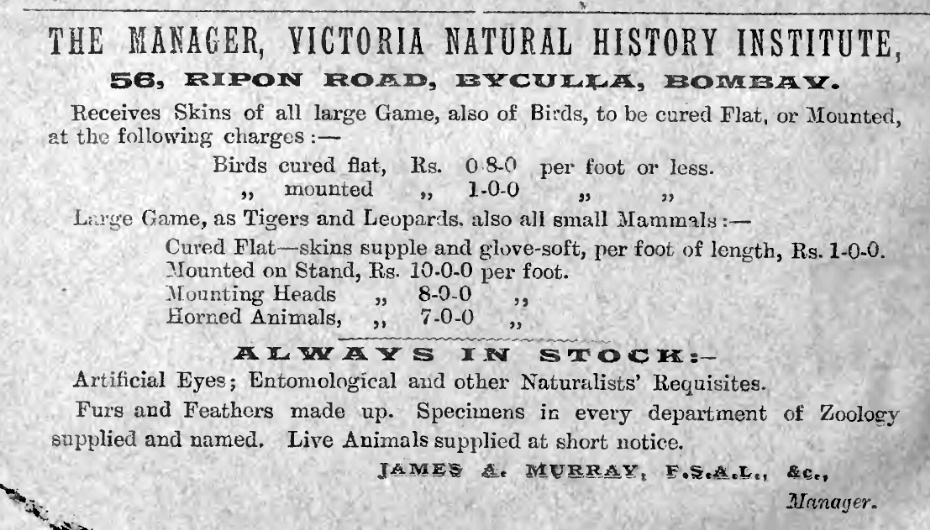
Advertisement for services

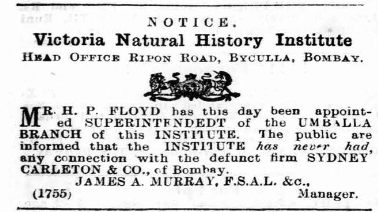
Advertisement, 1891

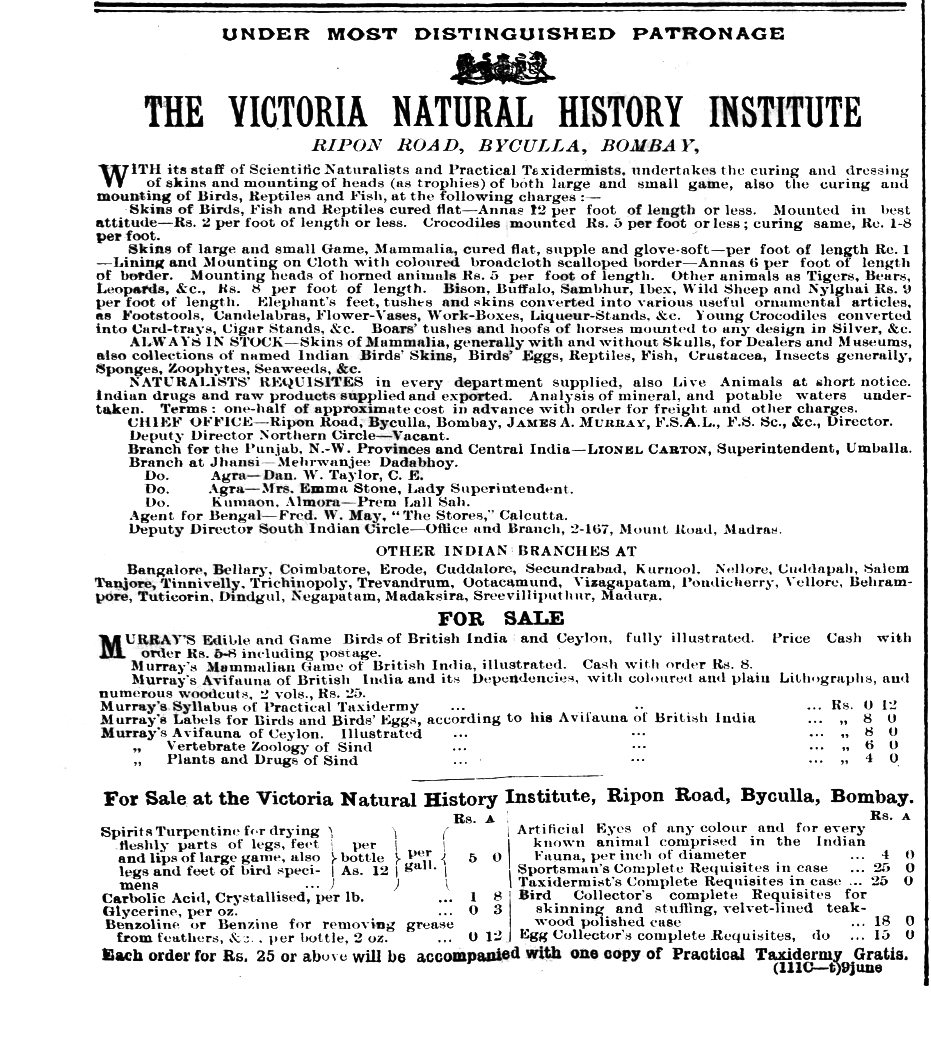
Advertisement, 1892

== Publications ==
- Murray, J.A. (1890) The Avifauna of the Island of Ceylon. Bombay: Educational Society Press.
- Murray, J.A. (1889) The Edible and Game Birds of British India with its Dependencies and Ceylon. London: Trubner.
- Murray, J.A. (1888) Indian Birds or the Avifauna of British India. Vols. 1-2. London: Trubner & Co.
- Murray, J.A. (1887) The Avifauna of British India and its dependencies.
- Murray, J.A. (1887) The Zoology of Beloochistan and Southern Afghanistan.
- Murray, J.A. (1884) The Vertebrate Zoology of Sind : a systematic account, with descriptions of all the known species of Mammals, Birds, and Reptiles inhabiting the province.
- Murray, J.A. (1881) The Plants and Drugs of Sind : being a systematic account, with descriptions, of the indigenous Flora.
- Murray, J.A. (1880) A Handbook to the Geology, Botany, and Zoology of Sind.
