= Maconachie =

Maconachie, Maconochie, McOnachie, or MacOnachie is a surname of Scottish origin. Notable persons with the surname include:

- Alexander Maconochie, Lord Meadowbank (1777–1861), Scottish judge and politician
- Alexander Maconochie (penal reformer) (1787–1860)
- Alexander Maconochie Centre, the gaol in the Australian Capital Territory
- G. A. Maconachie (1843–1909), army surgeon in British India
- Grant McConachie (1909 – 1965), Canadian pilot and businessman
- Ian Maconachie, Irish badminton player
- Sir Richard Roy Maconachie (1885-1962), British Indian civil servant
- Maconochie or Machonochie rations, canned food popular in World War II
