= Sris Chandra Basu =

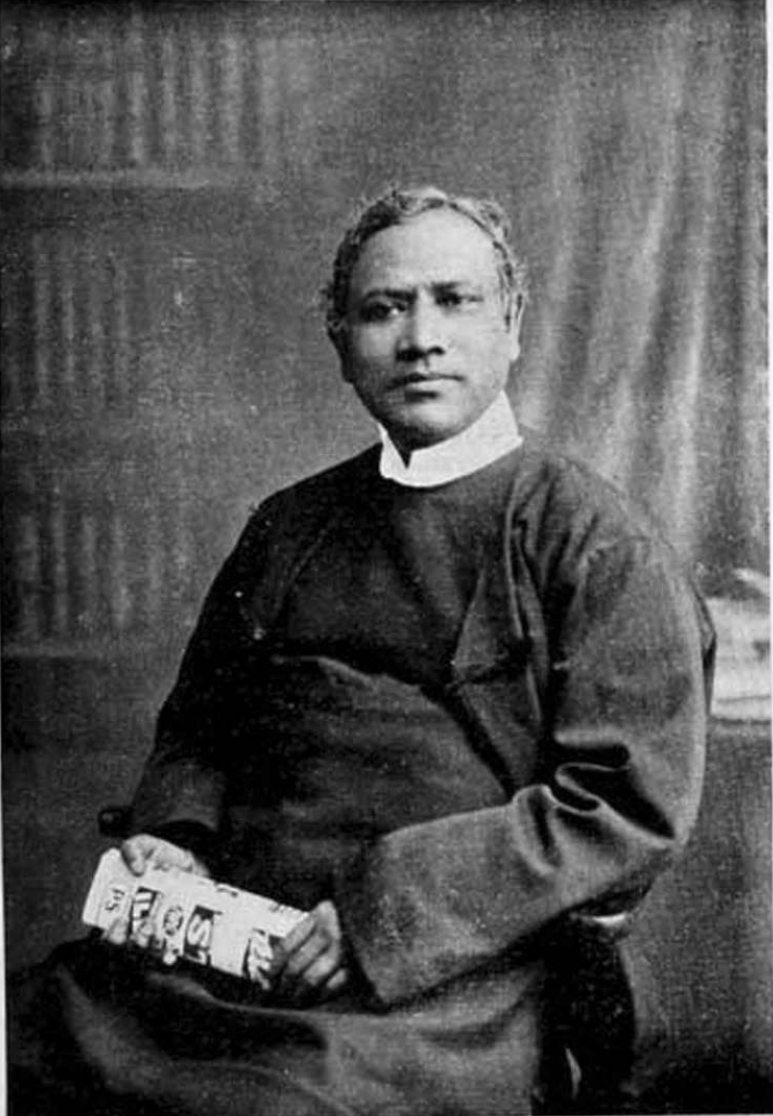

Sris Chandra Basu or Srish Chandra Vasu (20 March 1861 – 23 June 1918) was an Indian Sanskrit scholar, judge, writer and translator of numerous works. He translated major yoga texts such as the Yogaśāstra, the Gheranda Samhita, and the Siva Samhita into English, several through his own publishing setup called the Panini office in Allahabad.

== Life and work ==
Basu was the oldest son of Syama Charan Basu, a Bengali babu working under the British who had been involved in the establishment of the Punjab University, Lahore. At the age of six Basu's father died leaving his mother to bring him up along with three other siblings including Baman Das Basu. He was educated at the Lahore Mission School where his father had served as headmaster. He received a scholarship to study at the Lahore Government College and passed the First Arts Examination with Arabic as his second language. He then continued studies for a BA degree, while also taking an interest in religious literature, and shorthand. In order to gain some knowledge of science he attended lectures at the Lahore Medical College. He passed his BA in 1881 and gave a lecture on evolution at the Arya Samaj which was the first introduction to the subject in Hindi and was a sensation in Lahore at the time, with an essay in the Arya of Lahore (founded by Ratan Chand Bary in 1882) carrying his paper on Theory of Evolution from an Aryan point of view (1882) which was noticed by Madame Blavatsky in her note in The Theosophist (March, 1882). He took an interest in the Theosophical movement and established a Theosophical Society in Lahore. During this time he also met and collaborated with a yogi from Madras named Sri Sabhapati Swami. On 3 April 1883 at the Siksha Sabha Hall, Rai Bishan Lal, a Theosophist from Bombay was to demonstrate occult phenomena. Also present was John Campbell Oman and Lal's performance was described as irresponsible, leading to the society being disenfranchised by Colonel Olcott who called the members "Shylocks". While in college, Sris Chandra took part in a Student's Rebellion, organizing a strike in protest against the principal Dr Gottlieb Wilhelm Leitner for kicking a student. He joined the Brahmo Samaj in 1881 and was involved in establishing an Indian National Society. In 1883 Basu went to Calcutta where he was married in the last week of May to the daughter of Babu Ambika Charan Ghosh at a time when protests against the Ilbert Bill and the arrest of Surendra Nath Banerji had rocked the city. He also took the examination in 1883 for a vakilship and obtained the fifth position, the first place being taken by Moti Lal Nehru. He served in the Meerut High Court from July 1883. Following the Panjdeh incident in 1885, Meerut was carefully monitored by the Duke of Connaught posted as Commandant, fearing a repetition of the 1857 uprising. Sris then moved to Bareilly, working as a Munsif for a few months before transferring to the Allahabad High Court in November 1886. Here he had a habit of taking shorthand notes that was noticed by the Acting Chief Justice Straight who then appointed him as judgement-writer of the Court to replace Arthur Strachey. It was in Allahabad that he took an interest in the Mitakshara School of Hindu Law and began to study Panini's grammar in order to accurately understand the original sources in Sanskrit. On 30 April 1888 Basu was sent to report on the speech by A.O. Hume who was speaking at Allahabad. The idea of the Indian National Society that Basu established was suggested by the Theosophical Society and Basu had written a poem "India's heroes rise" and had sent Hume a collection of "Indian National Songs and Lyrics" which has been suggested as having influenced Hume. Basu founded the Panini Office in November 1891 so as to publish his and other works. Ramananda Chatterjee, principal of the Kayastha Pathshala served as an editor. In 1896 he was transferred to Benares. He was a correspondent of Annie Besant and supported her cause for birth-control and translated some of her works. Basu was titled Rai Bahadur in 1900 and nominated as a Fellow of the Allahabad University. The Bharat Dharma Mahamandal titled him as Vidyarnava in 1895. He was transferred to Ghazipur in 1905 as a sub-judge and then to Benares in 1907 as a judge for small causes. In 1908 he was again moved to Allahabad and in 1910 to Benares. He applied for ten months of leave from May 1915, prior to his retirement on 20 March 1916 and moved to Allahabad. Basu suffered from diabetes and high blood pressure and suffered from a spate of illnesses, and the loss of several friends and close family members just before his own death. He was cremated on 24 June and his ashes scattered into the Ganges.

== Works ==
- Siddhant Kaumudi (1906)
- The Ashtadhyayi. Translated into English by Srisa Chandra Vasu (1897)

== Cited references ==
- Bose, Phanindranath (1932). Life of Sris Chandra Basu. Ramananda Chatterjee.
- Swâmy, Sabhâpati (1880). Basu, Siris Chandra (ed.). Om, a treatise on Vedantic Raj Yoga Philosophy. "Civil and Military Gazette" Press, Lahore.
