= Walter Samuel Millard =

British naturalist

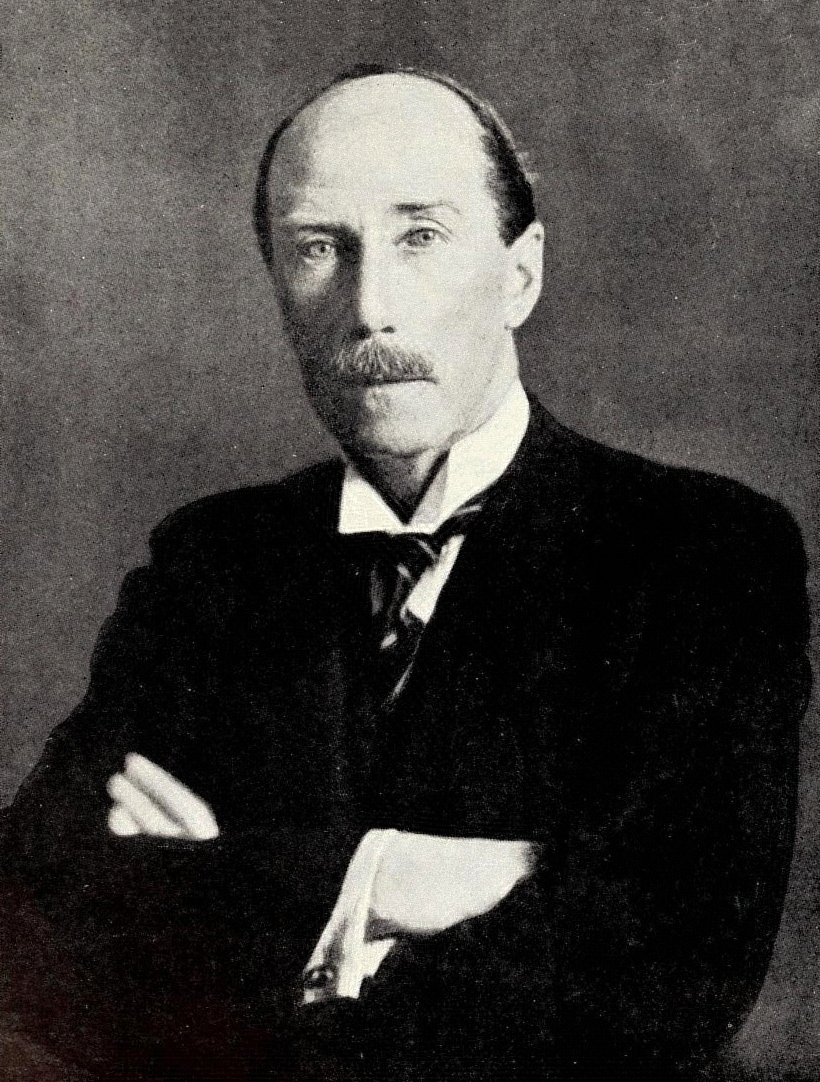
Walter Samuel Millard (1864–1952), driving force behind Bombay Natural History Society's Mammal Survey of the Indian subcontinent.

Walter Samuel Millard (1864–1952) was a British entrepreneur and naturalist who was honorary secretary of the Bombay Natural History Society, editor of the Journal of the Bombay Natural History Society from 1906 to 1920, co-author (with Ethelbert Blatter) of the classic, Some Beautiful Indian Trees, and the driving force behind the Mammal Survey of the Indian subcontinent conducted by the society between 1911 and 1923.

== Early life ==
Millard, the seventh son of Rev. J.H. Millard, was born in Huntingdon, England in 1864. He came out to Bombay at age 20 to assist in the wine business of Herbert (Musgrave) Phipson, then Honorary Secretary of the Bombay Natural History Society (BNHS) and the editor of its journal. Joining the Society in 1893, he was made assistant editor of the Journal. Upon Phipson's retirement in 1906, Millard became editor and remained so until 1920. Millard was married to a woman named Sybilla, who had a species of flying squirrel named after her, the Chindwin giant flying squirrel, Petaurista sybilla.

== Journal editor and gardening ==
During the years of Phipson's editorship, the Journal of BNHS had emerged as the premier natural history journal in Asia. Although other excellent Asian journals in the field were being published during Millard's editorial tenure, the Journal of BNHS remained the only one with both scholarly and general interest articles. During this time the Society began to publish serial articles from the Journal in book form. One of the best received such books was Stuart Baker's Indian Ducks and their Allies (1908).

Millard's main avocation was gardening, especially the cultivation of flowering trees. He is credited with introducing the Burmese Cassia renigera, the Pterocarpus indicus, and the South American Gliricidia maculata to the city of Bombay. Upon his suggestion, Fr. Ethelbert Blatter, SJ, Principal and Professor of Botany at St Xavier's College, Bombay, wrote the series Palms of India for the Journal. A few years later Blatter and Millard coauthored the series Some Beautiful Indian Trees, resulting in a book of the same name, which has since become a classic, and remains in print. Salim Ali credited his initiation into ornithology as a young boy to Millard, who helped identify a yellow-throated sparrow he had shot.

== Mammal survey ==
R. C. Wroughton, who, after retiring from the Indian Forest Service, was studying mammals at the British Museum, began to correspond with Millard and urged him to employ a collector (and taxidermist) for collecting small mammals for the Society. In 1910, C. A. Crump who had just arrived in Bombay offered his services as collector. Calling an urgent meeting of the Society, Millard helped build consensus for both employing Crump and launching a fund drive for a mammal survey. Within a year, enough funds had been raised to hire four full-time collectors, and with that the Mammal Survey began. Lasting 12 years, the survey helped build collections that became the basis for R.I. Pocock's two volumes, Mammalia, in the series The Fauna of British India, Including Ceylon and Burma. Both the commencement and the success of the survey depended largely on Millard's fund-raising and organizational work; this, he undertook in addition to his work as editor of the Journal and as manager of his employer's wine business, Messrs. Phipson and Co.

Millard was an early conservationist. Through his efforts, a "close time" was established for the hunting of certain birds, and other animals were given extra protection. After he left India in 1920, Millard spent many years in retirement, managing the Bombay Natural History Society's business in London. Millard died on 21 March 1952.
