= Herbert Musgrave Phipson =

British wine merchant and naturalist

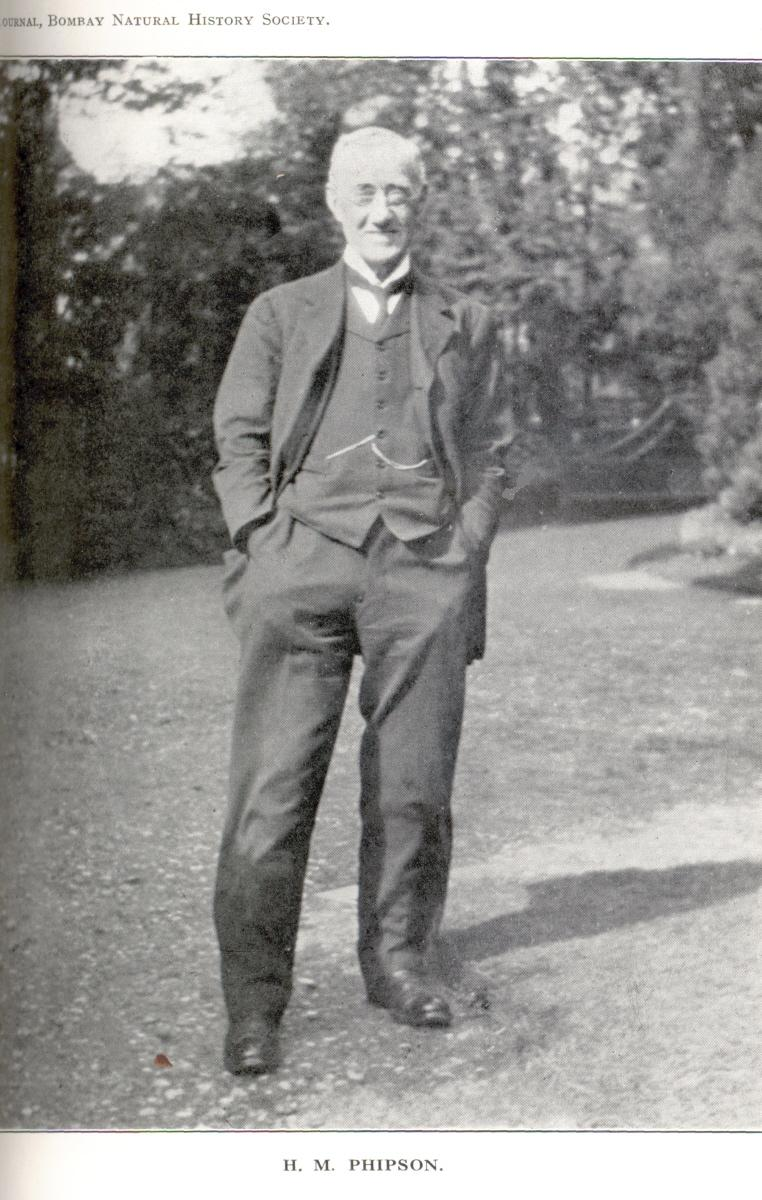
H. M. Phipson, businessman, naturalist, and longtime editor of the Journal of the Bombay Natural History Society.

Herbert Musgrave Phipson (c. 1850 – 7 August 1936), was a British wine merchant and naturalist who lived in Bombay (now Mumbai), India, from 1878 to 1905. As the honorary secretary of the Bombay Natural History Society, editor of its Journal, and manager of the Society's business and outreach activities, he played an important role in establishing the journal's reputation as the foremost natural history journal in Asia; he also influenced public science policy in the Bombay Presidency. His efforts saw fruition in the establishment of the Natural Sciences section of the Prince of Wales Museum of Western India. Phipson, who was married to the pioneering physician Edith Pechey-Phipson, co-founded, with his wife, the Pechey Phipson Sanitarium for Women and Children in Nasik, India.

== Biography ==
Phipson was born in London in about 1850 and educated at Clifton College. He went out to India in 1878 as a partner in the firm of J. A. Forbes & Co., Bombay. Five years later, he established his own company, Phipson & Co. Wine Merchants. He joined the Bombay Natural History Society (BNHS) in 1884 and in 1886 became both the Society's honorary secretary and the editor of its journal. He married Edith Pechey, head physician at the Cama Hospital for Women and Children, Bombay in 1889. In 1906, he and his wife returned to England, on account of her ill-health, to which, however, she succumbed two years later.

== Bombay Natural History Society ==
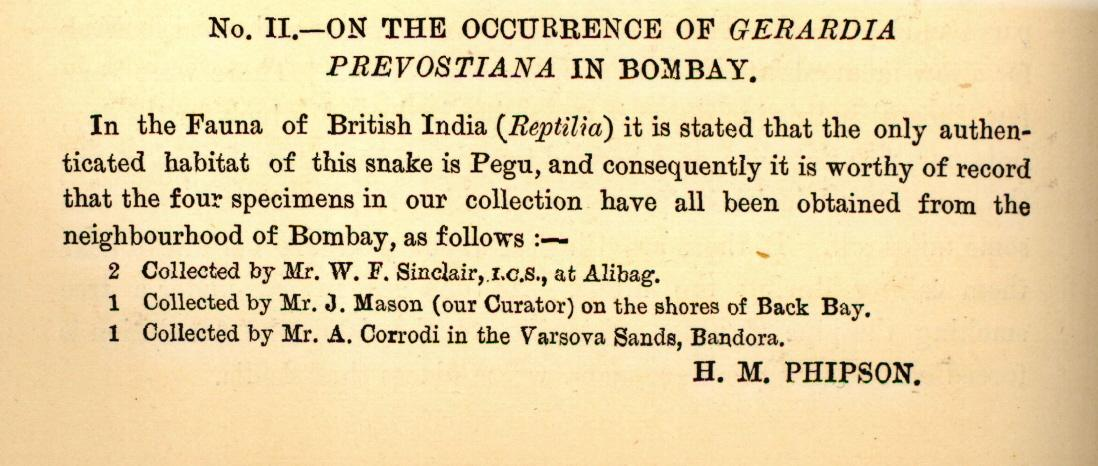
Figure 1. A short note by Phipson on Gerard's water snake.

Phipson was visiting England when the Bombay Natural History Society was founded on 15 September 1883. Upon his return to Bombay, he immediately joined BNHS and in January 1884 offered office space belonging to his business as a permanent home for the Society. Two years later, when the need was felt for BNHS to expand, he again offered the Society part of the larger premises he had acquired for his business at 6 Apollo Street, Bombay. This was to be BNHS's home for the next fifty years. From March 1886, when he succeeded E. H. Aitken as honorary secretary, to April 1906 when he returned to England, Phipson was the driving force behind the Society. He served as the editor of the Journal of the Bombay Natural History Society for twenty years – as the sole editor for fifteen years and then joint editor with W. S. Millard who succeeded him as honorary secretary. His main area of scholarly interest was snakes and, in spite of being tied down by his business and BNHS work, he found time to write the occasional note.

== Academic and Public Science ==
Phipson spent most of his BNHS-related work in three activities: on increasing the Society's reputation in the natural sciences by the publication of high-quality articles in its journal; on increasing the Society's importance to zoologists by building up its collections of both live animals and specimens; and on stepping up the society's public service efforts though its meetings and displays. During his tenure as editor, the journal became the best known natural history journal in Asia. The BNHS's ever increasing collection of live animals gave Phipson the idea of establishing a Society-managed zoological gardens in Bombay; this effort, however, failed, as the Bombay Municipality did not agree to the site selected by Phipson for the proposed zoo. A few years later Phipson was appointed to a committee charged with determining the feasibility of a public museum and library for Bombay. At one of the committee meetings, he proposed that three separate buildings be established, one each for an arts and archaeology museum, a public library, and a natural history museum. Phipson's proposal, including the site selected by him and the proposal for a separate building for natural history, was incorporated into the committee's final report presented in 1904; it found concrete expression in the inauguration in 1922 of the Prince of Wales Museum of Western India, many of whose natural history collections were both donated and managed by BNHS.

Figure 2. The sea snake Hydrophis phipsonii (Hydrophis cyanocinctus) found in the Bombay harbour, described by James A. Murray

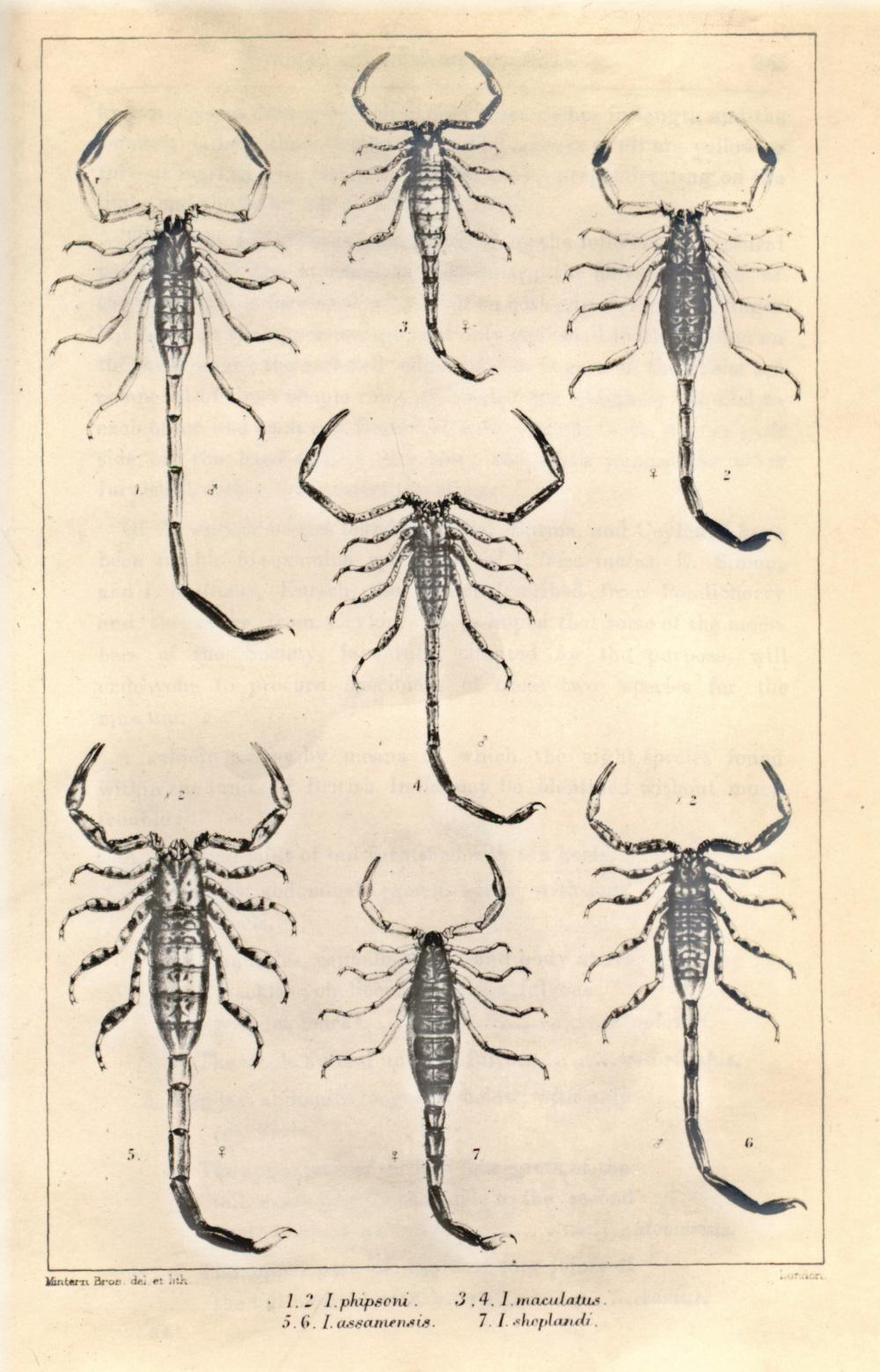
Figure 3. The scorpion Isometrus phipsoni (top row left and right) described by Eugene W. Oates

Figure 4. The external view of the mandible (3) of the Indian Galeod spider Rhagodes phipsoni described by R. I. Pocock

Figure 5. The Galeod solifuge Rhagodes phipsoni shown at the bottom right (3)

== Social Concerns ==
In the early 1880s, George A. Kittredge, an American businessman in Bombay, had inaugurated the "Medical Women for India Fund." The goal of the fund was to bring women physicians from England to work at a proposed medical institution for women and children in Bombay, which was to be staffed entirely by women, and to simultaneously lobby the University of Bombay, and its medical college to admit Indian women for medical education. Phipson joined the Fund, and soon became its secretary. It was through his activities at the Fund that Phipson met his future wife, Edith Pechey, who had just arrived in Bombay as Senior Physician at the Cama Hospital for Women and Children. He and Edith were married in March 1889.

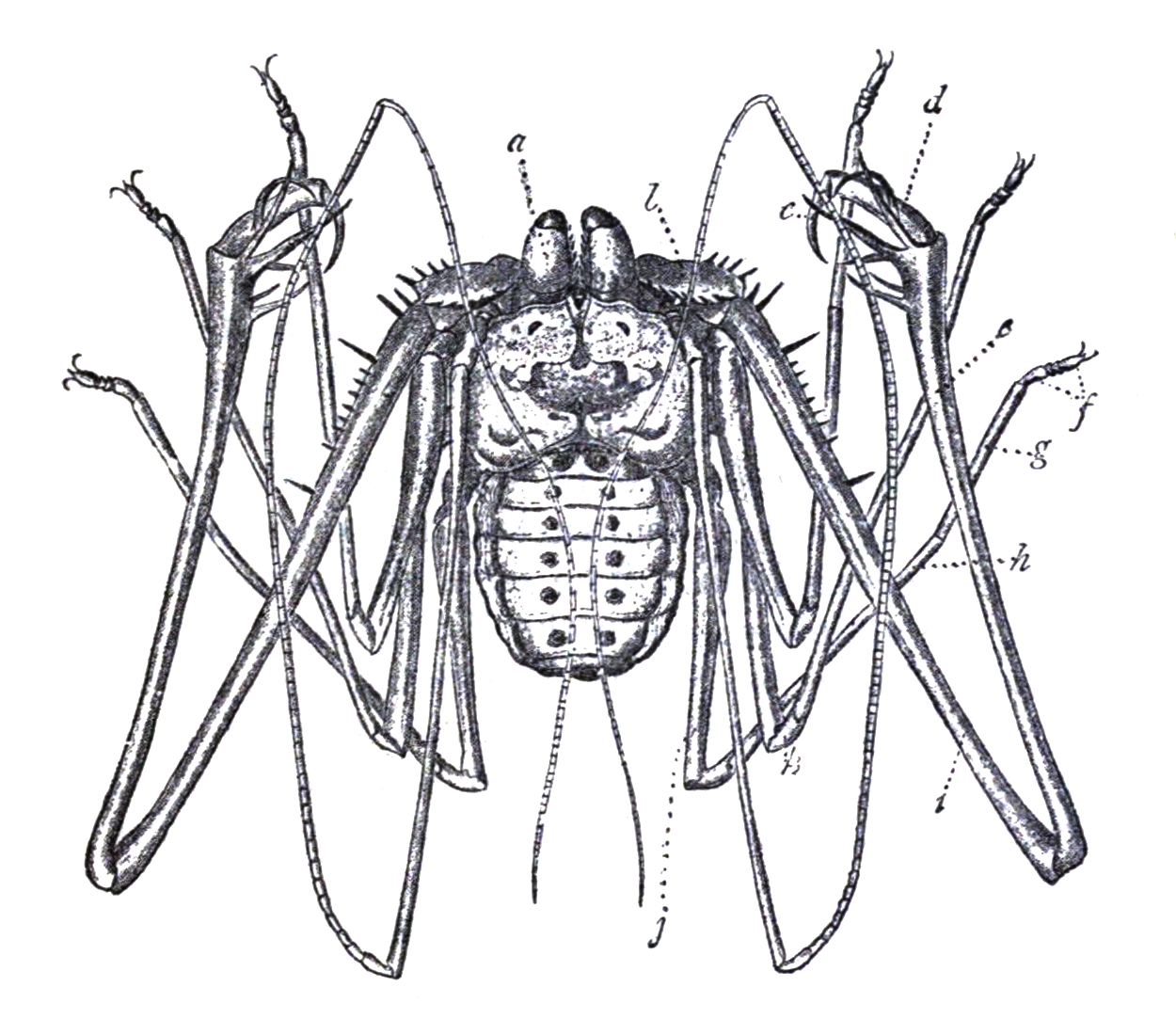
The Whip scorpion, Phyrynichus phipsoni described by Pocock 1900

Two years later, Phipson and Edith founded the Pechey-Phipson Sanatorium for Women and Children on the premises of their summer estate in Nasik, approximately 120 mi (193.12 km) north of Bombay, where they found the climate more hospitable. Here they constructed a convalescent community – with almost two dozen cottages, a working-girls' hostel, and a library – to which families or individuals that lacked the means to escape the "heat of the Bombay summer were invited to come for a month's stay; convalescent women and children especially were encouraged to take advantage of a health-renewing sojourn" at no rent and at nominal cost. Newspapers in Bombay advertised these accommodations and interested readers were asked to apply to Phipson and Co. for further arrangements.

== Return to England ==
By 1905, Edith's health had begun to fail and both Phipson and Edith made a decision to retire and return to England. The following year, they sailed from Bombay to London with stops in Australia, New Zealand, and Canada. In August 1906, soon after their return to England, Edith joined the Women's Suffrage Association of Leeds, and they both attended the conference of the International Women's Suffrage Alliance in Copenhagen. They also participated in the Mud March organised by the National Union of Women's Suffrage Societies in February 1907. By this time Edith was seriously ill with breast cancer and diabetes and underwent surgery for the cancer. Although successful for the cancer, the surgery could not save Edith's life, and she died in a diabetic coma on 14 April 1908 at their home in Folkestone, Kent. In 1910, two years after Edith's death, Phipson established a scholarship in her name at the London School of Medicine for Women. The scholarship, initially valued at £40 per year, and increased in 1919 to £100 per year, was awarded annually to a medical student, "preferably to one coming from India or going to work in India." The "Edith Pechey Phipson scholarship register" was to remain in place from 1912 to 1948. The "Pechey-Phipson Sanatorium for Women and Children" in Nasik, which Phipson had founded with Edith in 1891, continued to function until 1964.

In 1916, during BNHS's "Mammal Survey of India, Burma and Ceylon," the Indian race of the flying squirrel Petinomys vordermanni was named Petinomys phipsoni by Oldfield Thomas, who in the introduction to his paper said, "I have named this beautiful little animal in honour of Mr. H. M. Phipson, the former secretary of the Society, to whose initiative and enthusiasm the Society owes so much of its prosperity and to whose ready help most Indian Zoologists have at various times been greatly indebted."

H. M. Phipson died in London on 7 August 1936 at the age of 86.

== See also ==
- Bombay Natural History Society
- Walter Samuel Millard
- Prince of Wales Museum of Western India
- Natural History
- E. H. Aitken
