= Baman Das Basu =

Indian army physician and writer

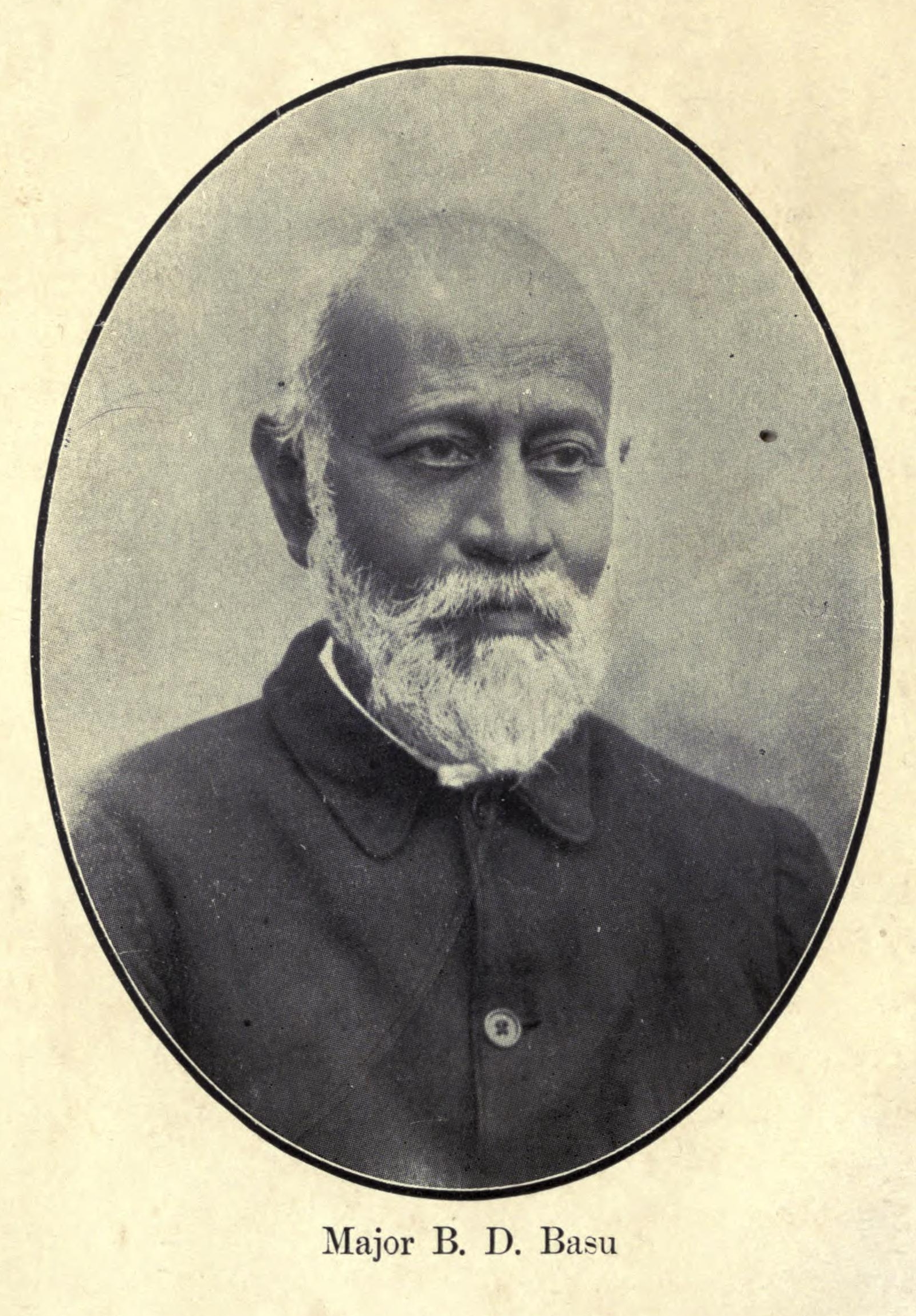
Toward the end of his life

Major Baman Das Basu (24 March 1867 – 23 September 1930) was an Indian army physician, botanist, nationalist, historian, and writer. He resigned from the Indian Medical Service after serving in Chitral and Sudan due to the conflict with his nationalism and joined his brother Sris Chandra Basu in editing and publishing books on Hinduism from the Panini Office, Allahabad. A promoter of Indian medical traditions, he completed the botanical work begun by K.R. Kirtikar on Indian medicinal plants.

== Biography ==
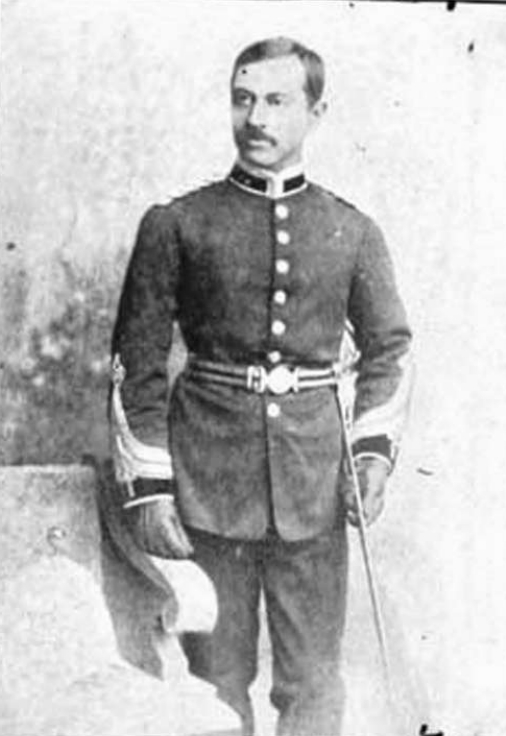
When joining the Indian Medical Service in 1891

Baman Das Basu was born in Lahore, the youngest son of Bhubaneshwari Devi and Shyama Charan Basu (who came from Tangra Bhabanipur, Khulna and studied at Calcutta under Alexander Duff). His father moved to Lahore and initially served as a headmaster of an American Mission school. He was later involved in organizing the department of education in Punjab including Punjab University but died when Basu was just five months old. An older brother Srisha Chandra Basu and his mother took care of him. Although entitled to pension, the family was cheated and pushed into poverty. His mother had to sell her jewellery to raise the children. Srisha was six years older and advised Baman to study Indian medicine systems. Basu entered the Lahore Medical College in 1882 but failed his midwifery exam in 1887. He however went on to study medicine in England, encouraged by his brother. He passed the LSA, MRCS and the IMS examinations and was commissioned in April 1891 and posted to the Bombay Presidency where he served until 1907. He saw wartime action in Sudan and in Chitral, and suffered scurvy, but his longest spell was as a civil surgeon in Ahmednagar. He took early retirement when he no longer could bear the conflict of supporting imperialists and his nationalist vision.

After retirement, Basu worked at the Panini Office in Allahabad started by Srisha. He wrote biographies of Indian medical celebrities, a book "My Sojourn in England'' and numerous short contributions to the Modern Review. Even while in England he wrote to the Congress paper India on a Serious indictment of the examinations for the Indian Medical Service. (1890). He put together a large collection of books and set up a library in Allahabad named after his mother, the Bhubaneswari library. Colonel K. R. Kirtikar was so impressed by the library that he bequeathed his own collection to it. In 1920 Basu gifted Kirtikar's herbaria, books and journals relating to botany to the Calcutta University and suggested that they set up a Kirtikar Herbarium. He founded the Jagat-Taran Girls' High School in Allahabad (named after his sisters).

Basu married Srimati Sukumari Devi, daughter of Babu Hari Mohan De of Allahabad in 1887. Shortly after the birth of their son his wife suffered from tuberculosis and died in 1902. His son was then raised by his sister Jagat Mohini Das. Basu was opposed to the caste system and said that it would lead to the downfall of Hinduism and also publicly condemned child marriage and the purdah system. He was strongly against Islam and Anglicization. He admired Swami Bhaskarananda Saraswati. He served as president of the 9th all-India Ayurvedic conference held in Lahore.

== Diabetes ==
Basu believed that diabetes could be treated by a vegetarian diet and authored the book The Dietetic Treatment of Diabetes, in 1909. In the book he stated that "diabetic patients who are vegetarians live longer than those who are meat eaters". This statement was disputed by a reviewer in The British Medical Journal.

His recommended diet for diabetic patients excluded meat, while allowing milk, butter, and vegetable oils. Basu condemned European doctors who were prescribing meat to diabetic patients. Basu's book sold well to the public, between 1909–1925 it went through thirteen editions.

Basu died from diabetes in 1930.

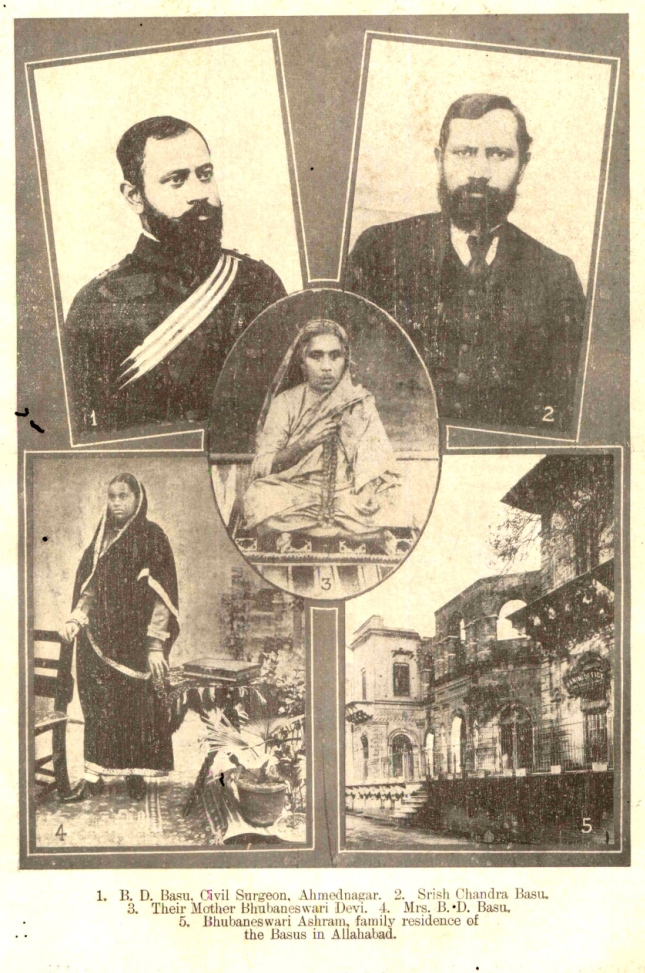

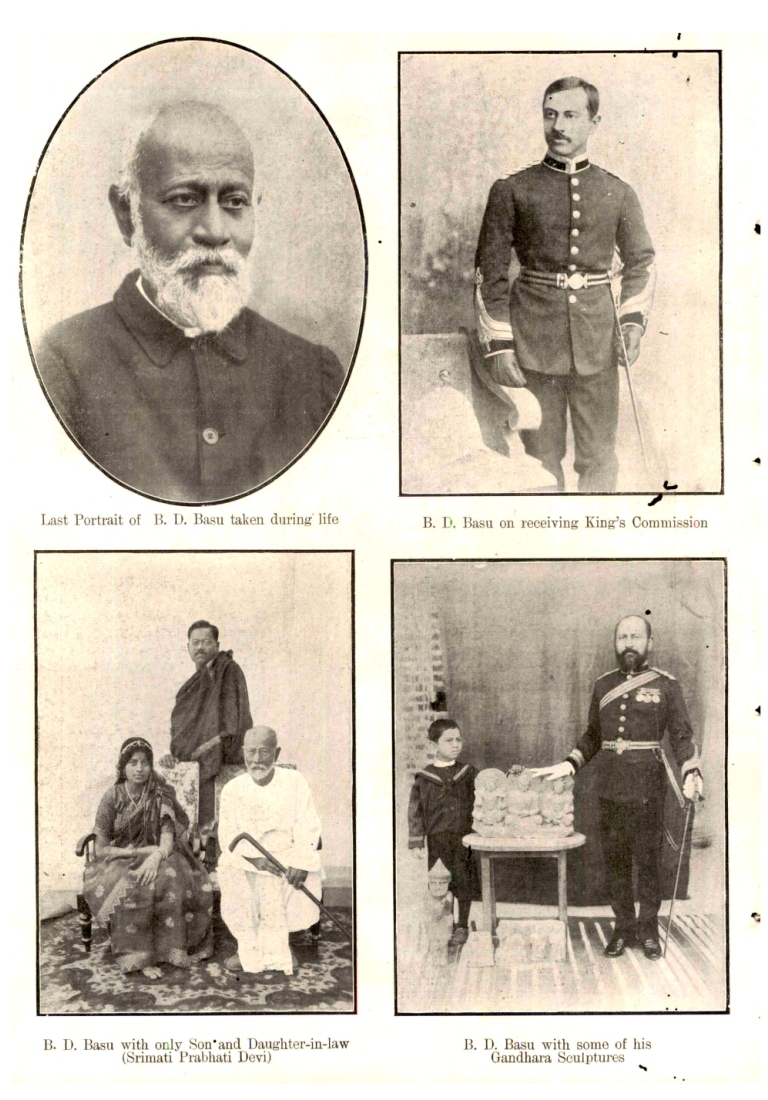

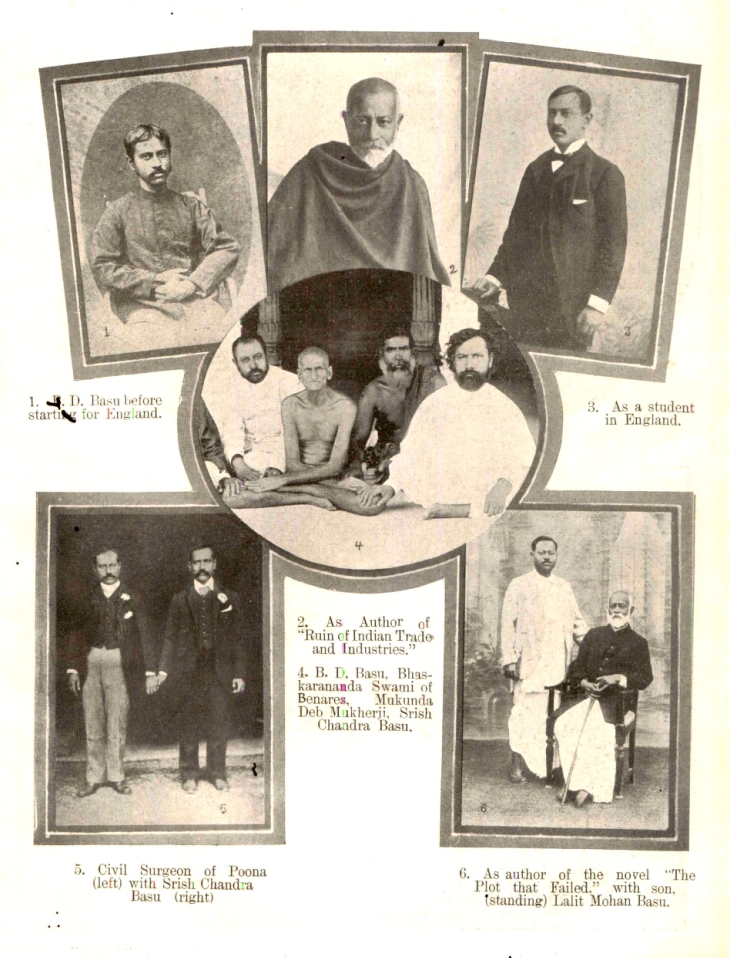

== Publications ==
The major books he wrote and edited include:

- The Sacred Books Of The Hindus (compilation)
  - Volume 1
  - Volume 8. The Nyaya Sutras of Gotama
  - Volume 13
  - Volume 17. Part 1. The Matsya Puranam
  - The Bhaktiratnavali
  - The Aitareya Brahmanam of The Rigveda
- The Dietetic Treatment of Diabetes (1909)
- Indian Medicinal Plants (1918, with K.R. Kirtikar)
- History of Education in India, Under the Rule of the East India Company (1922, 1934)
- India under the British Crown (1933, with Phanindra Nath and Nagendra Nath Bose)
- Diabetes Mellitus and its Dietetic Treatment (1930)
