= Robert Charles Wroughton =

British biologist, mammalogist, and entomologist (1849-1921)

Robert Charles Wroughton (15 August 1849, in Naseerabad – 15 May 1921) was a British biologist, mammalogist, and entomologist. He an officer in the Indian Forest Service from 10 December 1871 to 1904. Trained in forestry in France, he joined the Indian Forest Service in the Bombay Presidency and rose to become Inspector-General of Forests for India until his retirement in 1904.

== Life and work ==
Wroughton was the son of Major-General R. C. Wroughton. Educated at Bedford School and King's College, London he studied forestry at the L’Ecole Forestiere, Nancy, France, he was appointed to the Indian Forest service on Dec. 10th, 1871, as Assistant Conservator of Forests in the Bombay Presidency. He was a member of the Bombay Natural History Society (BNHS) and was interested in Hymenoptera, particularly ants (in collaboration with A. Forel) and then later took an interest in scorpions due to his interaction with Reginald Innes Pocock. He rose to the rank of Inspector General of Forests and retired in 1904.

His major work was on the mammals of India and after his retirement in 1904, became a regular worker at the Natural History Museum in London. He initially took an interest in African mammals and there was little material from India. He persuaded his friends in India to collect specimens and this led to a collaborative mammal survey in 1911. Interest in small mammals was also raised by work on plague particularly due to the work of Captain Glen Liston who delivered a special address to the members of the BNHS. Collectors for the small mammal survey included C. A. Crump (Khandesh, Darjeeling), Sir Ernest Hotson (Baluchistan), R. Shunkara Narayan Pillay (Travancore), J. M. D. Mackenzie (Burma), Captain Philip Gosse (Poona, Nilgiris), S. H. Prater (Satara), Charles McCann and others and the survey went on until 1923. It is believed to be the first collaborative biodiversity study in the world. The project accumulated 50,000 specimens over 12 years, especially of the smaller mammals and the information was published in 47 papers. Wroughton was also helped by his brother-in-law T. B. Fry who continued to work after his death in 1921. Several new species were discovered in the process.

Wroughton married Mary, daughter of Captain Freeman of the Indian Navy, in 1877.

Numerous species are named after him including

- Wroughton's Free-tailed Bat (Otomops wroughtoni)
- Many ant species: (Aenictus wroughtonii, Camponotus wroughtonii, Cardiocondyla wroughtonii, Carebara wroughtonii, Chronoxenus wroughtonii, Crematogaster wroughtonii, Hypoponera confinis wroughtonii, Lepisiota rothneyi wroughtonii, Monomorium wroughtoni, Monomorium wroughtonianum, Pheidole wroughtonii, Platythrea wroughtonii, Polyrhachis wroughtonii, Rhoptromyrmex wroughtonii, Tapinoma wroughtonii, Temnothorax wroughtonii)

== Publications ==
1. Wroughton R C 1912a. Bombay Natural History Society's Mammal Survey of India: Report 1. J. Bombay Nat. Hist. Soc. 21(2):392-410.
2. Wroughton R C 1912b. Bombay Natural History Society's Mammal Survey of India: Report 2. J. Bombay Nat. Hist. Soc. 21(3):820-825.
3. Wroughton R C 1912c. Bombay Natural History Society's Mammal Survey of India: Report 3. J. Bombay Nat. Hist. Soc. 21(3):826-844.
4. Wroughton R C 1912d. Bombay Natural History Society's Mammal Survey of India: Report 4. J. Bombay Nat. Hist. Soc. 21(3):844-851.
5. Wroughton R C 1912e. Bombay Natural History Society's Mammal Survey of India: Report 5. J. Bombay Nat. Hist. Soc. 21(4):1170-1195.
6. Wroughton R C and K V Ryley 1913a. Bombay Natural History Society's Mammal Survey of India: Report 6. J. Bombay Nat. Hist. Soc. 22(1): 29–44.
7. Wroughton R C and K V Ryley 1913b. Bombay Natural History Society's Mammal Survey of India: Report 7. J. Bombay Nat. Hist. Soc. 22(1): 45–47.
8. Wroughton R C and K V Ryley 1913c. Bombay Natural History Society's Mammal Survey of India: Report 8. J. Bombay Nat. Hist. Soc. 22(1): 58–66.
9. Wroughton R C. 1913. Scientific results from the mammal survey # III. J. Bombay Nat. Hist Soc. 22(1): 13–21.
10. Wroughton R C 1914. Bombay Natural History Society's Mammal Survey of India: Report 15. J. Bombay Nat. Hist. Soc. 23(2):282-301.
11. Wroughton R C 1915a. Bombay Natural History Society's Mammal Survey of India: Report 16. J. Bombay Nat. Hist. Soc. 23(3):413-416.
12. Wroughton R C 1915b. Bombay Natural History Society's Mammal Survey of India: Report 17. J. Bombay Nat. Hist. Soc. 23(4):695-720.
13. Wroughton R C. 1915c. Scientific results from the mammal survey # XI. J. Bombay Nat. Hist Soc. 24(1): 29–65.
14. Wroughton R C 1915d. Bombay Natural History Society's Mammal Survey of India: Report 18. J. Bombay Nat. Hist. Soc. 24(1):79-96.
15. Wroughton R C 1915e. Bombay Natural History Society's Mammal Survey of India: Report 19. J. Bombay Nat. Hist. Soc. 24(1):96-110.
16. Wroughton R C 1916a. Bombay Natural History Society's Mammal Survey of India: Report 20. J. Bombay Nat. Hist. Soc. 24(2):291-309.
17. Wroughton R C 1916b. Bombay Natural History Society's Mammal Survey of India:Report 21. J. Bombay Nat. Hist. Soc. 24(2):309-310.
18. Wroughton R C 1916c. Bombay Natural History Society's Mammal Survey of India:Report 22. J. Bombay Nat. Hist. Soc. 24(2):311-316.
19. Wroughton R C 1916d. Bombay Natural History Society's Mammal Survey of India:Report 23. J. Bombay Nat. Hist. Soc. 24(3):468-493.
20. Wroughton R C 1916e. Bombay Natural History Society's Mammal Survey of India: Report 24. J. Bombay Nat. Hist. Soc. 24(4):749-758.
21. Wroughton R C 1916f. Bombay Natural History Society's Mammal Survey of India:Report 25. J. Bombay Nat. Hist. Soc. 24(4):758-773.
22. Wroughton R C 1916g. Bombay Natural History Society's Mammal Survey of India: Report 26. J. Bombay Nat. Hist. Soc. 24(4):773-782.
23. Wroughton R C. 1917a. Scientific results from the mammal survey # XV. J. Bombay Nat. Hist. Soc. 25(1): 40–51
24. Wroughton R C 1917b. Bombay Natural History Society's Mammal Survey of India: Report 27. J. Bombay Nat. Hist. Soc. 25(1):63-71.
25. Wroughton R C 1917c. Bombay Natural History Society's Mammal Survey of India: Report 28. J. Bombay Nat. Hist. Soc. 25(2):274-278.
26. Wroughton R C. 1918a. Scientific results from the mammal survey # XVII. J. Bombay Nat. Hist. Soc. 25(3): 361.
27. Wroughton R C 1918b. Summary of the results from the Indian mammal survey of Bombay natural History Society, Part I. J. Bombay Nat. Hist. Soc. 25(4): 547–598.
28. Wroughton R C 1918c. Summary of the results from the Indian mammal survey of Bombay natural History Society, Part II. J. Bombay Nat. Hist. Soc. 26(1): 19–58.
29. Wroughton R C 1919. Summary of the results from the Indian mammal survey of Bombay natural History Society, Part III. J. Bombay Nat. Hist. Soc. 26(2): 338–378.
30. Wroughton R C 1920a. Summary of the results from the Indian mammal survey of Bombay natural History Society, Part VI. J. Bombay Nat. Hist. Soc. 27(1): 57–85.
31. Wroughton R C 1920b. Summary of the results from the Indian mammal survey of Bombay natural History Society, PartVII. J. Bombay Nat. Hist. Soc. 27(2): 301–313.
32. Wroughton R C 1920c. Bombay Natural History Society's Mammal Survey of India: Report 32.J. Bombay Nat. Hist. Soc. 27(2):314-322.
33. Wroughton R C 1921a. Summary of the results from the Indian mammal survey of Bombay natural History Society, Appendix. J. Bombay Nat. Hist. Soc. 27(3):520-534.
34. Wroughton R C 1921b. Bombay Natural History Society's Mammal Survey of India: Report 33. J. Bombay Nat. Hist. Soc. 27(3):545-549.
35. Wroughton R C 1921c. Bombay Natural History Society's Mammal Survey of India: Report 34. J. Bombay Nat. Hist. Soc. 27(3):549-553.
36. Wroughton R C 1921d. Bombay Natural History Society's Mammal Survey of India: Report 35. J. Bombay Nat. Hist. Soc. 27(3):553-554.
37. Wroughton R C. 1921e. Scientific results from the mammal survey # XXVI. J. Bombay Nat. Hist. Soc. 27(3): 599–601.
38. Wroughton R C. 1921f. Scientific results from the mammal survey # XXVIII. J. Bombay Nat. Hist. Soc. 27(4): 773–777.
39. Wroughton R C. 1921g. Scientific results from the mammal survey # XXIX. J. Bombay Nat. Hist. Soc. 28(1): 23–25
