= Sri Sabhapati Swami =

Indian yoga teacher

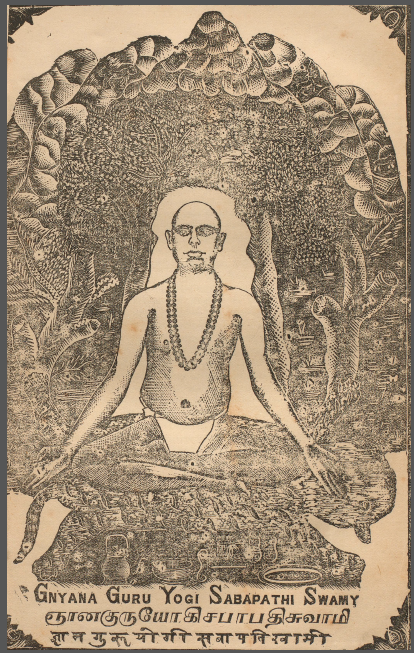
Śrī Sabhāpati Svāmī meditating in padmāsana.

Sri Sabhapati Swami (also transliterated "Śrī Sabhāpati Svāmī" and "Sabhapaty Swami," Tamil: சபாபதி சுவாமிகள் "Capāpati Cuvāmikaḷ," Devanāgarī: सभापति स्वामी) was born around the year 1828 in Madras (modern Chennai), Tamil Nadu, India. Sabhāpati's writings survive in Sanskrit, Tamil, Hindi, English and German (with bibliographic records also in Bengali, French, and Urdu), and are notable for their rich visual depictions of the subtle body (liṅga-śarīra) and their early fusion of Rājayoga and Haṭhayoga techniques of meditation in a Vedantic and Tamil Śaivite context.

== Biography ==
Sabhāpati's earliest biographical sources record that after being educated at a Christian missionary school, he traveled to Burma (Myanmar) on textile trade business with his father-in-law, where he interacted with Buddhist phongyi ("monks"). Returning to Tamil Nadu, he soon departed for the predominantly Islamic maraikkāyar port city of Nagore (near Nagappatinam), where he interacted with fakirs at the 16th century dargah of the Sufi pir Saiyid Abd al-Qadir Shahul Hamid Naguri (1502-1570 C.E.).

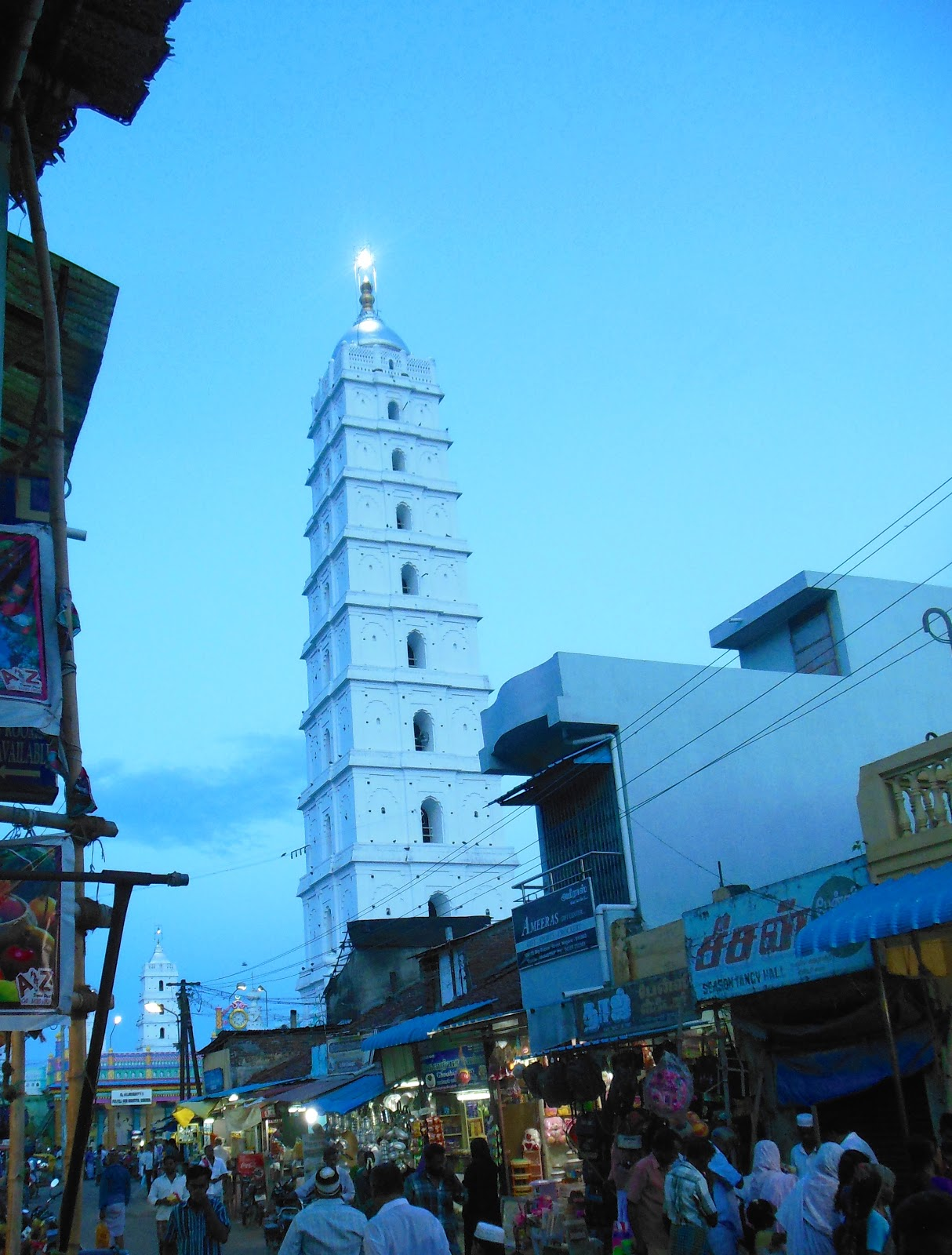
A Minaret of the Nagore Dargah.

Following his travels in Burma and Nagapattinam (which together lasted three years), Sabhāpati's "admirer" mentions that despite his exploits in comparative religion his "mind was not at ease" and that he was still "far from obtaining the true Spirituality (brahma-jñāna)." This anxiety gave way to a midnight vision at the age of twenty-nine, when the Vedic sage Agastya appeared and told him to go to Vedaśreṇi, a once rural temple site now situated amid a rapidly developing tech hub in modern Chennai (Velachery, Tamil: Veḷacceri). At Vedaśreṇi it is said that he obtained śiva-darśana. It is here that Agastya again communicated to Sabhāpati his desire for him to travel to a hermitage deep in the heavily-forested Nīlagiri ("Blue Mountain") range of South India, situated on the borders of the modern states of Tamil Nadu, Karnataka and Kerala. After a long journey his biography records that he encountered his guru who welcomed him into the company of adepts. Śrī Sabhāpati Swami then returned to Madras with a new-found spiritual passion, and the accounts agree that he began to publish his various works and that he also went on pilgrimages to many of the major Hindu temple circuits in India and Nepal (Kedarnāth, Muktināth, and Paśupatināth) before traveling to Lahore (in modern-day Pakistan). He published his last book (in the Tamil language) in 1913. One group claims he attained Mahasamadhi in 1940 at "Pudhupatti" located few kilometres away from Vadamadurai in Dindigul district, Tamilnadu, as a shrine has been erected by the villagers where he attained Mahasamadhi, but this is not verified and unlikely. The more likely site of his jīvasamādhi is in Konnur / Villivakkam, outside Chennai, which was the location of his maṭālayam or "meditation hall" as he called it.

== Teachings on yoga ==
The Twelve Faculties of Sabhāpati Swami (original diagram published in 1884, with new overlaid references pointing to the cakra referred to in the text itself).

Sabhāpati's diagram on svarūpa ("inherent forms")

Śrī Sabhāpati Swami’s literature contains detailed meditations that are designed to pierce one’s veils of delusion (bhrānti), caused by deceiving impressions (vāsana), in order to reach an isolated state of liberation (mukti). The delusions lift through a gradual awakening the kuṇḍalinī and its accompanying jñānākāśa ("aether of gnosis") or prāṇākāśa ("aether of vitality") along twelve cakras of the spine and through four transcendent principles. Also advocated (yet kept distinct from Rājayoga proper) are "nine states of practice": Patañjali’s standard fare of aṣṭāṅga — yama, niyama, āsana, prāṇāyāma, dhāraṇā, dhyāna, samādhi — plus samyāma, glossed as the cancellation "of consciousness of all internal and external faculties."

These practices allow the yogi to embody various "essential images" or "inherent forms" (svarūpas), which Sabhāpati variously glosses as "spiritual visions," "spiritual states," or "spiritual phenomena." In one diagram, for instance, he outlines as many as seven svarūpas, which he calls the "seven spiritual states of God." These are formulated in the mind through processes of bhāvana "meditative formulation," a term used in a technical sense to describe the assumption of a specific form to the exclusion of anything else.

== Publication history ==
While lecturing in Lahore, Sabhāpati met his editor Sriṣa Chandra Vasu (Bengali: Basu) (1861-1918), an educated Bengali civil servant and Sanskritist who himself moved in Theosophical circles and published widely on yoga, including an early edition of the Śiva-saṃhitā. Mark Singleton points out in his landmark study that Vasu later came to be an icon of early 20th century Hindu revivalism. Together they published Sabhāpati's lectures in English with transliterated Sanskrit terms as early as 1880, over fifteen years before Swami Vivekananda's Rāja Yoga (1896), the publication of which Elizabeth De Michelis convincingly demonstrates as marking the birth of modern yoga. The original title of Sabhāpati's work was Om: a treatise on Vedantic Raj Yoga and Philosophy (1880), and it attracted even the attention of Indologists such as Max Müller, who cites it in his work The Six Systems of Indian Philosophy (1899). Henry Olcott's personal copy of this book has also been located in the library at Adyar, and reviews of it and Sabhāpati's other works populate early Theosophical periodicals. Elaborations and revisions of this 1880 text were later published in various languages, including in Sanskrit, Hindi and a Tamil version that, if the account of Sabhāpati's "admirer" is to be believed, likely contains material that predates the 1880 work in English. One of the most notable versions is a much more precisely edited and visually stunning two-part volume entitled Om: Cosmic Psychological Spiritual Philosophy and Science, published four years later in 1884. This work combined material published in 1880 with even more practical instructions, visual diagrams and associative correspondences. Another version was published in 1892 in Sanskrit (Devanāgarī script) and Hindi, using the Sanskrit version of the previous work's title, Rājayoga brahmajñānānubhūti saṅgraha veda.

The work also stayed in print well into the 20th century. In 1908 a German translation based on the 1880 work was made by one of the founders of the O.T.O., the Theosophist author Franz Hartmann. In 1915 an exclusively Tamil Sanskrit edition was published in Madras with a few new diagrams. Sabhāpati's works also made their way to the United States, and the eclectic and profiteering William Estep published a stripped down version of the two-volume 1884 edition in 1929. In India, a revised edition based on a later edition of the 1880 work was published in 1950 from a Hindu temple publisher in Mumbai, and a facsimile of the 1880 work was published in 1977 in New Delhi. Despite such an abundant publication history, Sabhāpati's English works today remain largely out of print and removed from popular memory.

Sabhapati also published his teachings on yoga in Tamil, Hindustani, Bengali (as a translation), and Telugu (no longer extant). His collected works, most of which are long out of print, are currently being edited and translated (where applicable) for re-publication.

== Relationship with early modern yoga ==
Sabhāpati has had a far-reaching impact on South Asian, North American, and European esoteric and occult conceptions of the body. With the exception of publications by Keith E. Cantú, Karl Baier, Gordan Djurdjevic, and Henrik Bogdan, however, Sabhāpati has been mostly overlooked by scholars researching the subject of early modern yoga and tantra.

== Relationship with the Theosophical Society ==
Sabhāpati originally seems to have been on good terms with members of the Theosophical Society, as he is cited favorably in their works and periodical journals. However, he lost their favor after a misunderstanding over a vision in which he claimed to have been caught up to Lake Manasarovara in modern Tibet to commune with Mahādeva on Mount Kailāśa. The vision, which he communicated as happening in his physical body, is reminiscent of Kālidāsa's classical Sanskrit poem "Meghadūta," in which a cloud-messenger travels in the air to Mount Kailāśa to send a message on behalf of a lonely yakṣa to his lover. In any event, the Theosophists seem to have taken it literally — Henry Olcott (1832-1907) records in his diaries that both he and H.P. Blavatsky (1831-1891) were disenchanted with Sabhāpati after they met with him personally and he recounted his vision to them in terms of a physical experience. Olcott writes:

Whatever good opinion we may have formed of him before was spoilt by a yarn he told us of his exploits as a Yog. He had, he said, been taken up at Lake Mânsarovara, Tibet, high into the air and been transported two hundred miles along the high level to Mount Kailâs, where he saw Mahadeva! Ingenuous foreigners as H.P.B. and I may have been, we could not digest such a ridiculous falsehood as that. I told him so very plainly. If, I said, he had told us that he had gone anywhere he liked in astral body or clairvoyant vision, we might have believed it possible, but in physical body, from Lake Mânsarovara, in company with two Rishis mentioned in the Mahabharata, and to the non-physical Mount Kailâs—thanks, no: he should tell it to somebody else.

A response to this negative view can be traced in later editions of Śrī Sabhāpati Swami's works. For example, the 1895 reprint to OM adds the following footnote (presumably written by Vasu) in the part of Sabhāpati's account that mentions this vision:

This need not have been in the physical body of the Rishis; they might have flown towards the holy mountain in their Mayavi Rupa Kama Rupa (astral body), which to our author (who certainly is not an Adept in the sense the Theosophists use the word) must have been as real as if he had travelled through air in his physical body.

In any event, either from this misunderstanding or from other issues the Theosophical Society subsequently abandoned the support it may have had previously for Sabhāpati and his works.

== Relationship with Thelema ==
Whereas the early Theosophists ultimately dismissed Sabhāpati, the British occultist and poet Aleister Crowley (1875-1947) came to deeply appreciate his work and cited him often in his literature. Crowley wrote in his Confessions that he first became attracted to Sabhāpati's literature during his travels in 1901 to Ceylon (modern Sri Lanka) and Madurai en route to visit his friend Allan Bennett / Ananda Maitreya Bhiksu (1872-1923), a fellow initiate of Crowley's in the Hermetic Order of the Golden Dawn. During Crowley's sojourn in Madurai he became exposed to Sabhāpati's works and became particularly interested in Sabhāpati's rich visual meditations (dhyāna) on the spinal cord as a phallus (liṅga) and the cranial vault as the kteis (yoni), which he published in modified form as an instruction for his students.

Sabhāpati's subtle physiology is situated around twelve tantric cakras and four transcendent states, which in part may also explain Crowley's willingness to entertain notions of additional cakra to the commonly known system of seven (or "six plus one") as usually found in Western New Age systems of the cakra that follow the pattern laid out by Charles W. Leadbeater (1854-1934) and John Woodroffe / Arthur Avalon (1865-1936). In any case, the continuing practice of certain aspects of Sabhāpati's system does live on in Thelema, a religio-philosophical tradition deeply associated with Crowley.

== See also ==
- Eight Lectures on Yoga
