= Jean Ferdinand Caius =

French Jesuit priest in India

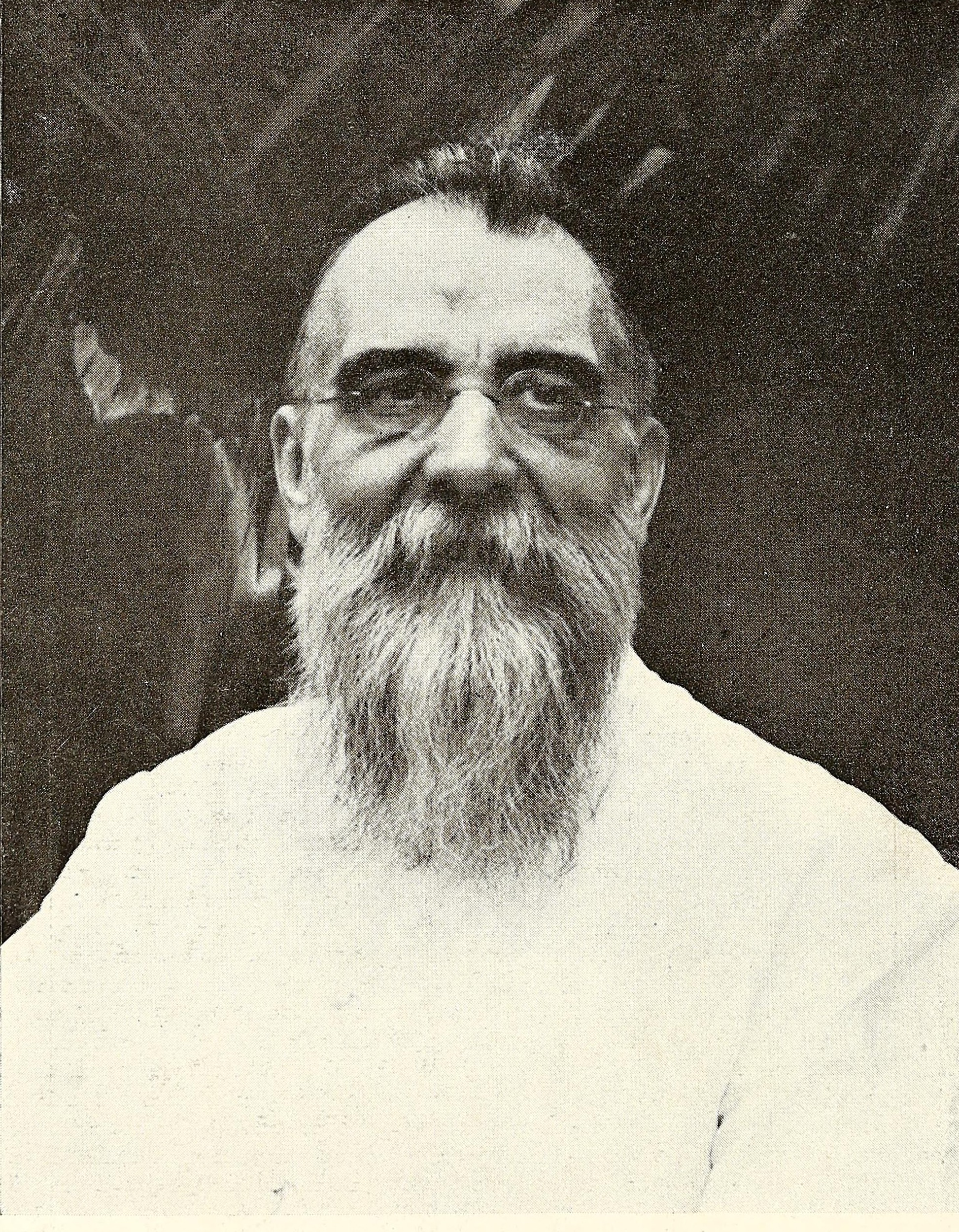

Jean Ferdinand Caius (17 January 1877 – 27 July 1944) was a French Jesuit priest in India who taught botany and conducted pharmacological studies on medicinal and toxic plants as well as on snake and scorpion venoms in India. He also served on the Indian Drugs Enquiry Committee (1930-31) .

== Life and work ==
Caius was born in a village in the district of le Medoc. He went to school in Toulouse before joining the Society of Jesus. He came to India in 1895 as part of the Madura Mission. He was posted to teach at St. Joseph's College, Tiruchirapalli until 1905. He also started a natural history museum at the college. He completed theological studies at Kurseong and then at St Beunos College in North Wales. He was ordained at Milltown park, Dublin in 1908. He studied at the school of medicine at the University of Paris around 1909. In 1911 he returned to India and continued teaching at Tiruchirapalli until 1922. His work on medicinal plants and animal toxins led to his being appointed as a pharmacologist to the Haffkine Institute in Bombay in 1924. Along with Mhaskar he conducted some of the earliest pharmacological studies on indigenous herbal drugs. He collaborated with Marie Phisalix on snake venoms. Together they examined the effects of secretions of various glands on birds, guinea pigs, and lizards. They found that salivary gland extracts of some snakes considered non-venomous had toxic effects. In 1930, he was included as a member of the Indian Drugs Enquiry Committee under Colonel R. N. Chopra. During this period he also examined scorpions, the study of whose venoms he had begun in 1912. He was also involved in a BNHS study of the attraction of mammals to salt licks and the composition of the soils. He retired in 1932 and then continued to teach and conduct research at St. Xavier's College in Bombay. He was a member of the Bombay Natural History Society in whose journal he regularly published on plants. This included a major series on the poisonous plants of India which he wrote right until the time of his death. He also was an editor for the journal. He published books on the plant medicines used for snake bite and on poisonous plants. He was made Officier d’Academie in 1929 and Officer de L’Instruction Publique (1936) by the French government. He died in Bombay. A laboratory at St Xavier's college is named after him.
