= G. A. Maconachie =

British Indian army medical officer

George Archibald Maconachie (7 September 1843 – 26 June 1909) was a British surgeon who worked in the Indian Medical Service, later serving as professor of ophthalmology at the Grant Medical College, Bombay and at Aberdeen University. He was one of the founders of the Bombay Natural History Society.

== Biography ==
Maconachie was born in Towie to James (1824-1887) and Jane Symon (1820-1869) and was educated at the Aberdeen Grammar School, following which he joined Aberdeen University, receiving a MB, CM (1866) and later in 1872 an MD. He joined the Indian Medical Service in 1867 and was posted to Bombay where he saw action during the Abyssinian war at Magdala, with the 3rd Sind Horse, sharing a tent during this period with William Lockhart. He was then posted a professor of ophthalmology at the Grant Medical College in Bombay, serving later as its principal. He was also a member of the Bombay Educational Department and served on several government committees and was a director of the Bombay Mechanics' Institution. In 1883 he was one of the founders of the Bombay Natural History Society. From 1872 to 1895 he was an eye surgeon at the Sir Cowasji Jehangir Ophthalmic Hospital. He retired as a Brigade Surgeon in June 1891 and settled at Aberdeen where he became a member of the Aberdeen School Board from 1900 to 1903. He also worked as a lecturer on tropical medicine at Aberdeen University.

Machonachie married Margaret Crombie Edmond (1849-1911) in 1871 at Bombay and they had a daughter Ada Blanche (1872-1918) and a son Gordon William (born 1881) who also joined the Indian Medical service. He is buried in Allenvale Cemetery, Aberdeen.
