= Edward Hamilton Aitken =

British civil servant and naturalist

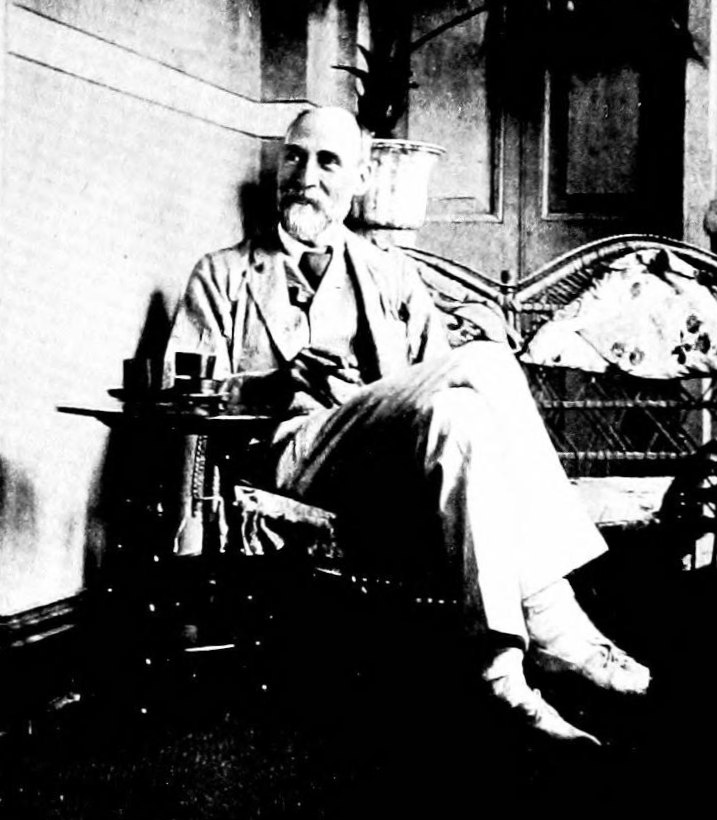
Edward Hamilton Aitken (1851-1909)

Edward Hamilton Aitken (16 August 1851 – 11 April 1909) was a British civil servant in India, better known for his humorist writings on natural history in India and as a founding member of the Bombay Natural History Society. He was well known to Anglo-Indians by the pen-name of Eha.

== Early life ==
Eha was born at Satara in the Bombay Presidency on 16 August 1851. His father was the Rev. James Aitken, missionary of the Free Church of Scotland. His mother was a sister of the Rev. Daniel Edward, a missionary to the Jews at Breslau for some fifty years. He was educated by his father in India. His higher education was obtained at Bombay and Pune. He passed M.A. and B.A. of Bombay University, first on the list, and won the Homejee Cursetjee prize with a poem in 1880. From 1870 to 1876, he taught Latin at the Deccan College in Pune. He also knew Greek and was known to be able to read the Greek Testament without the aid of a dictionary. He grew up in India, and it was only later in life that he visited England for the first time, and he found the weather of Edinburgh severe.

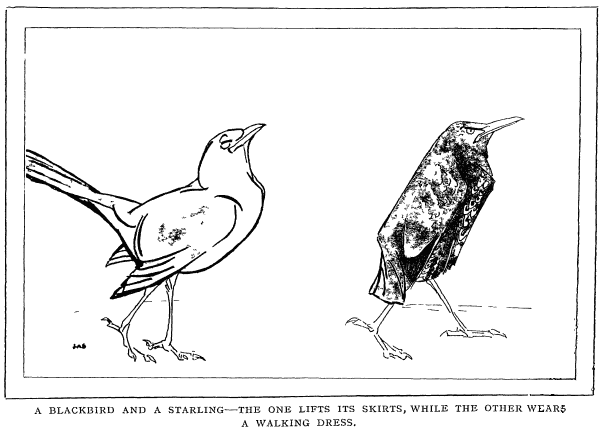
Illustration from his Concerning Animals and Other Matters

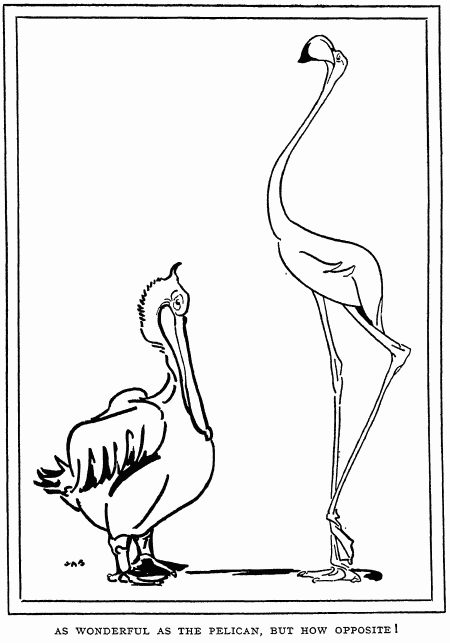
Illustration from his Concerning Animals and Other Matters

== Career ==
He entered the Customs and Salt Department of the Government of Bombay in April 1876, and served in Kharaghoda (referred to as Dustypore in The Tribes on my Frontier), Uran, Uttara Kannada and Goa Frontier, Ratnagiri, and Bombay itself. In May 1903, he was appointed Chief Collector of Customs and Salt Revenue at Karachi, and in November 1905, was made Superintendent in charge of the District Gazetteer of Sind. He retired from the service in August 1906.

He married Isabella Mary, the third daughter of the Rev. J. Chalmers Blake of the Free Church of Scotland on 22 December 1883 in Bombay and they had two sons and three daughters. Their daughter - Jesse Helen, married James Hood Wilson Lownie (1887-1961), and their son Ralph became a colonial judge and author of Auld Reekie. Their grandson is the author Andrew James Hamilton Lownie.

== Natural history ==
He explored the jungles on the hills near Vihar around Bombay and wrote a book called The Naturalist on the Prowl. His writing style was accurate and at the same time amusing to his readers. He studied most of his subjects in life and was very restricted in his collecting.

In response to an appeal for information on rats due to plague in Bombay, he wrote an article for The Times of India (19 July 1899), in which he threw a flood of light on the subject of the habits and characteristics of the Indian rat as found in town and country. He wrote that Mus rattus, the old English black rat, which is the common house rat of India outside the large seaports, has become, through centuries of contact with the Indian people, a domestic animal like the cat in Britain.

In 1902 he was deputed to investigate the prevalence of malaria at the Customs stations along the frontier of Goa, and to devise means for removing the position of the Salt Peons who were affected by malaria in these places. During this expedition he discovered a new species of anopheline mosquito, which after identification by Major James, I.M.S., was named after him as Anopheles aitkeni. During his service he took to writing the Annual Reports of the Customs Department and was frequently thanked for the same. Reviewers have commented that these reports are enlivened by his witty literary touch. In the last two years of his service he was put in charge of The Sind Gazetteer. On completion of this work he retired to Edinburgh. He died after a short illness on 25 April 1909, in Edinburgh.

He refused to be depressed by life in India. "I am only an exile," he remarks, "endeavouring to work a successful existence in Dustypore, and not to let my environment shape me as a pudding takes the shape of its mould, but to make it tributary to my own happiness." He therefore urged his readers to cultivate a hobby.

He wrote:

It is strange that Europeans in India know so little, see so little, care so little, about all the intense life that surrounds them. The boy who was the most ardent of bug-hunters, or the most enthusiastic of bird-nesters in England, where one shilling will buy nearly all that is known, or can be known, about birds or butterflies, maintains in this country, aided by Messrs. B. &. S., an unequal strife with the insupportableness of an ennui-smitten life. Why, if he would stir up for one day the embers of the old flame, he could not quench it again with such a prairie of fuel around him. I am not speaking of Bombay people, with their clubs and gymkhanas and other devices for oiling the wheels of existence, but of the dreary up-country exile, whose life is a blank, a moral Sahara, a catechism of the Nihilist creed. What such a one needs is a hobby. Every hobby is good—a sign of good and an influence for good. Any hobby will draw out the mind, but the one I plead for touches the soul too, keeps the milk of human kindness from souring, puts a gentle poetry into the prosiest life. That all my own finer feelings have not long since withered in this land of separation from 'old familiar faces,' I attribute partly to a pair of rabbits. All rabbits are idiotic things, but these come in and sit up meekly and beg a crust of bread, and even a perennial fare of village moorgee cannot induce me to issue the order for their execution and conversion into pie. But if such considerations cannot lead, the struggle for existence should drive a man in this country to learn the ways of his border tribes. For no one, I take it, who reflects for an instant will deny that a small mosquito, with black rings upon a white ground, or a sparrow that has finally made up its mind to rear a family in your ceiling, exercises an influence on your personal happiness far beyond the Czar of the Russias. It is not a question of scientific frontiers—the enemy invades us on all, sides. We are plundered, insulted, phlebotomised under our own vine and fig-tree. We might make head against the foe if we laid to heart the lesson our national history in India teaches—namely, that the way to fight uncivilised enemies is to encourage them to cut one another's throats, and then step in and inherit the spoil. But we murder our friends, exterminate our allies, and then groan under the oppression of the enemy. I might illustrate this by the case of the meek and long-suffering musk-rat, by spiders or ants, but these must wait another day....
The 'poor dumb animals' can give each other a bit of their minds like their betters, and to me their fierce and tender little passions, their loves and hates, their envies and jealousies, and their small vanities beget a sense of fellow-feeling which makes their presence society. The touch of Nature which makes the whole world kin is infirmity. A man without a weakness is insupportable company, and so is a man who does not feel the heat. There is a large grey ring-dove that sits in the blazing sun all through the hottest hours of the day, and says coo-coo, coo, coo-coo, coo until the melancholy sweet monotony of that sound is as thoroughly mixed up in my brain with 110° in the shade as physic in my infantile memories with the peppermint lozenges which used to 'put away the taste,' But as for these creatures, which confess the heat and come into the house and gasp, I feel drawn to them. I should like to offer them cooling drinks. Not that all my midday guests are equally welcome: I could dispense, for instance, with the grey-ringed bee which has just reconnoitred my ear for the third time, and guesses it is a key-hole—she is away just now, but only, I fancy, for clay to stop it up with. There are others also to which I would give their congé if they would take it. But good, bad, or indifferent they give us their company whether we want it or not.

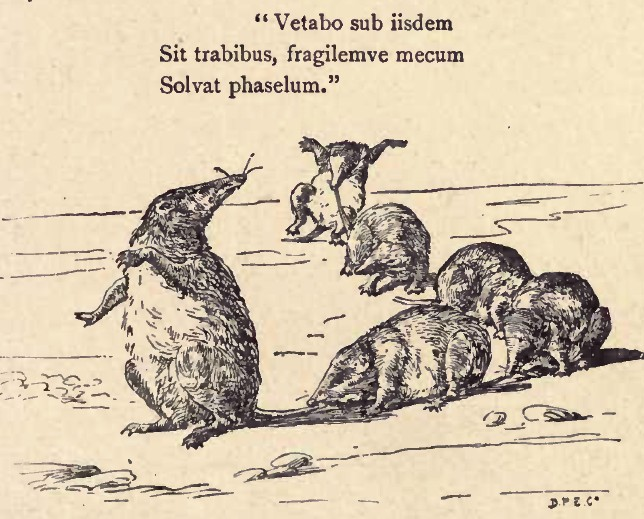
Illustration of the habits of Suncus murinus

He worked at the museum of the Bombay Natural History Society, an organization that he founded and published many of his notes in the Journal of the Bombay Natural History Society. He was also the first joint-editor of that journal, secretary to the Insect division of the BNHS and president for some time.

In one famous case a subordinate of EHA working in the Salt department in Kanara came to his bungalow with a snake on his shoulder. Eha wrote that the man had seen two snakes fighting and said 'I smashed at them with a stick-one got away, but I killed this one and have brought it to you-What is it ?' 'It is a King cobra, and you have not killed it' replied Eha. The snake was put in a crate and sent to the BNHS with the note 'It may not survive the journey. If it does not you will know it by the smell. If there be no smell be careful.' The snake survived for two years in the BNHS.

He was a proponent of the study of living birds as opposed to the bird collectors of his time. He wrote in his Birds of Bombay

The first steps may have to be taken through blood, and I must own that in my boyhood I was murderous in heart, but not in hand, for I had no gun, only a catapult; and for this I am thankful. I seldom killed anything, while the hours I spent in stalking my game and watching for a chance of getting a fair shot taught me more about the personal habits of birds than I could have learned in any other way. Since that I have shot a great many beautiful and harmless birds with ever-increasing reluctance, but there was no other means of becoming acquainted with them. The descriptions in Jerdon and Barnes and Oates all presuppose a specimen in your hand, to be measured with a foot-rule and examined feather by feather. There was no museum to which I could resort, and it was seldom my lot to fall in with anybody who could enlighten me if I asked, What bird is that ? Most gladly therefore would I try to make atonement now by helping others to know without killing, as far as it lies in me.

In a similar manner he studied the life-histories of butterflies unlike most butterfly collectors of the time.

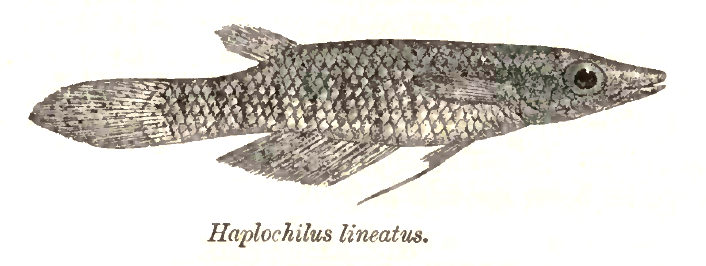
Scooties Haplochilus lineatus

He maintained an aquarium and made Sunday-morning expeditions to the ravines at the back of Malabar Hill to search for mosquito larvae to feed its inmates. Mr. Aitken investigated the capabilities for the destruction of larvae, of a small surface-feeding fish with an ivory-white spot on the top of its head, which he had found at Vihar in the stream below the bund. It took him some time to identify these particular fishes (Haplochilus lineatus) which he called "Scooties" for their lightning rapidity of their movements. With these he stocked the ornamental fountains of Bombay to keep them from becoming breeding-grounds for mosquitoes, and they are now largely used throughout India for this very purpose.

T. R. Bell, a naturalist friend, writing of him after his death said

He was a good man in every sense of the word; a strongly religious man, a pleasant companion, broad minded, exceedingly tolerant of the weaknesses of others, gentle and lovable and a rare example of a man without a single enemy.

Eha once wrote:

He whose ear is untaught to enjoy the harmonious discord of the birds, travels alone when he might have company.

He kept many pets at home and Surgeon-General Bannerman noted in his preface to Eha's books that he often found himself having to go on unpleasant trips to the primeval forests of Cumballa Hill to look for mosquito larvae to feed the fish. In appearance Eha has been described as a long, thin, erect, bearded man...with a typically Scots face lit up with the humorous twinkle one came to know so well. A photograph taken in 1902 shows a fringe of hair encircling a bald head which is commented upon by Bannerman as "a condition which Kemp's Equatorial Hair Douche had not been able to prevent".

Despite the popular reception for his book, a contemporary review in the Pall Mall Gazette of his book Tribes on my frontier termed his work as being entirely based on the kind of humour established by Phil Robinson. The review said:

Now, it may safely be said that if Mr Robinson had never written In my Indian Garden E.H.A. would never have written ... Every one of Mr. Robinson's little tricks of manner have been faithfully and almost ludicrously copied: the smalle ingenious tags from classical poets, the quaint mixture of Solomon and Darwin, the funny little jumps from pure science to pure nonsense, nay, even the very phrases, like the "obscene saturnalia" of the frogs, or the "promise and potency" of the mosquito- all are reproduced in minute imitativenss by this all too faithful admirer".

== Writings ==
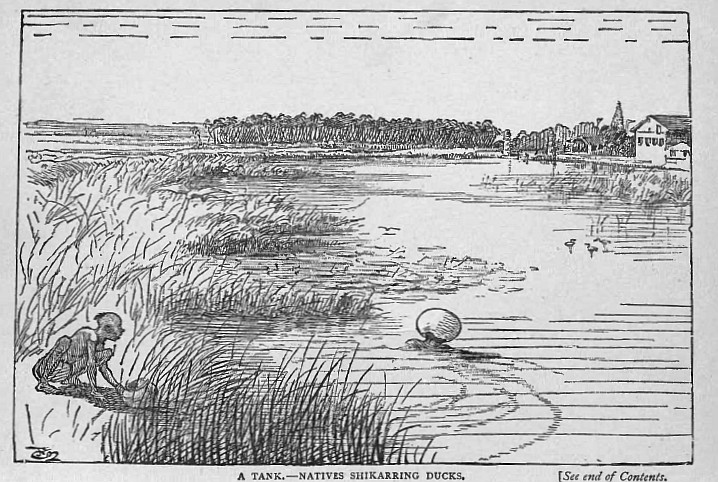
Illustration of Indian waterfowl hunting technique from The Tribes on My Frontier

His books include

- An Indian Naturalist's Foreign Policy (1883)
- Behind the Bungalow (1889)
- The Naturalist on the Prowl (1894)
- The Five Windows of the Soul (1898)
- The Common Birds of Bombay (1900)
- The Tribes on my Frontier (1904)
- Gazetteer Of The Province Of Sindh (1907)

After returning to Edinburgh, he wrote a series of articles on birdlife in the Strand Magazine.
