= Stanley Henry Prater =

Domiciled British naturalist in India affiliated with the Bombay Natural History Society

Stanley Henry Prater (1890–1960), naturalist who studied the mammals of the Indian subcontinent.

Stanley Henry Prater (12 March 1890 – 12 October 1960) was a domiciled British naturalist in India best known as a long-time affiliate of the Bombay Natural History Society and the Prince of Wales Museum of Western India, Bombay, as curator of both institutions for the better part of three decades, and as author of The Book of Indian Animals. Prater represented the Anglo-Indian and domiciled British community in the Bombay Legislative Assembly from 1937 to 1947.

== Early life ==
Prater was born in the Nilgiris (southern India) where his father, William Prater, was a coffee planter. As a student of St Mary's High School, Bombay, he spent his school holidays in the Western Ghats—experiences that led to a burgeoning interest in natural history. He joined the Bombay Natural History Society (BNHS) in 1907. Prater developed his intimate knowledge of the mammals of the Indian subcontinent during the Society's Mammal Survey (1911–1923), during which he was also grievously wounded when he was accidentally shot in the thigh.

== Curator and editor ==
In 1923, he became the curator of the BNHS and the Prince of Wales Museum of Western India, positions he held for 25 years. The same year, Prater traveled to Great Britain to train in modern taxidermy. Four years later he traveled to the American Museum of Natural History in New York City and the Field Museum of Natural History in Chicago, to learn about techniques of natural history exhibition, knowledge that he brought to bear in the Prince of Wales Museum displays of the next two decades.

During the last 25 years his tenure at BNHS, Prater became executive editor of Journal of the Bombay Natural History Society. Among his notable innovations in this position was the series "Wildlife Preservation in India," which appeared in the journal in 1935, and which did much to publicize the problems of conservation in India. The journal gained much of its international reputation during Prater's stewardship. Another enduring contribution from this time was his book, The book of Indian Animals, published in 1948. The book remains in print, now in its third edition.

== Political representative ==
From 1930 to 1947, Prater was president of Anglo-Indian and Domiciled European Association, and their representative in the Bombay legislative assembly—services for which he was awarded the OBE in 1943. In 1948, after India's independence, he represented the Anglo-Indian community in the Indian Constituent Assembly in the early deliberations about the Constitution of India. However, soon thereafter, he and his family decided to emigrate to Great Britain.

S.H. Prater died in London in 1960 after a long and debilitating illness.

== See also ==
- Salim Ali
- Bombay Natural History Society
- Indian natural history
