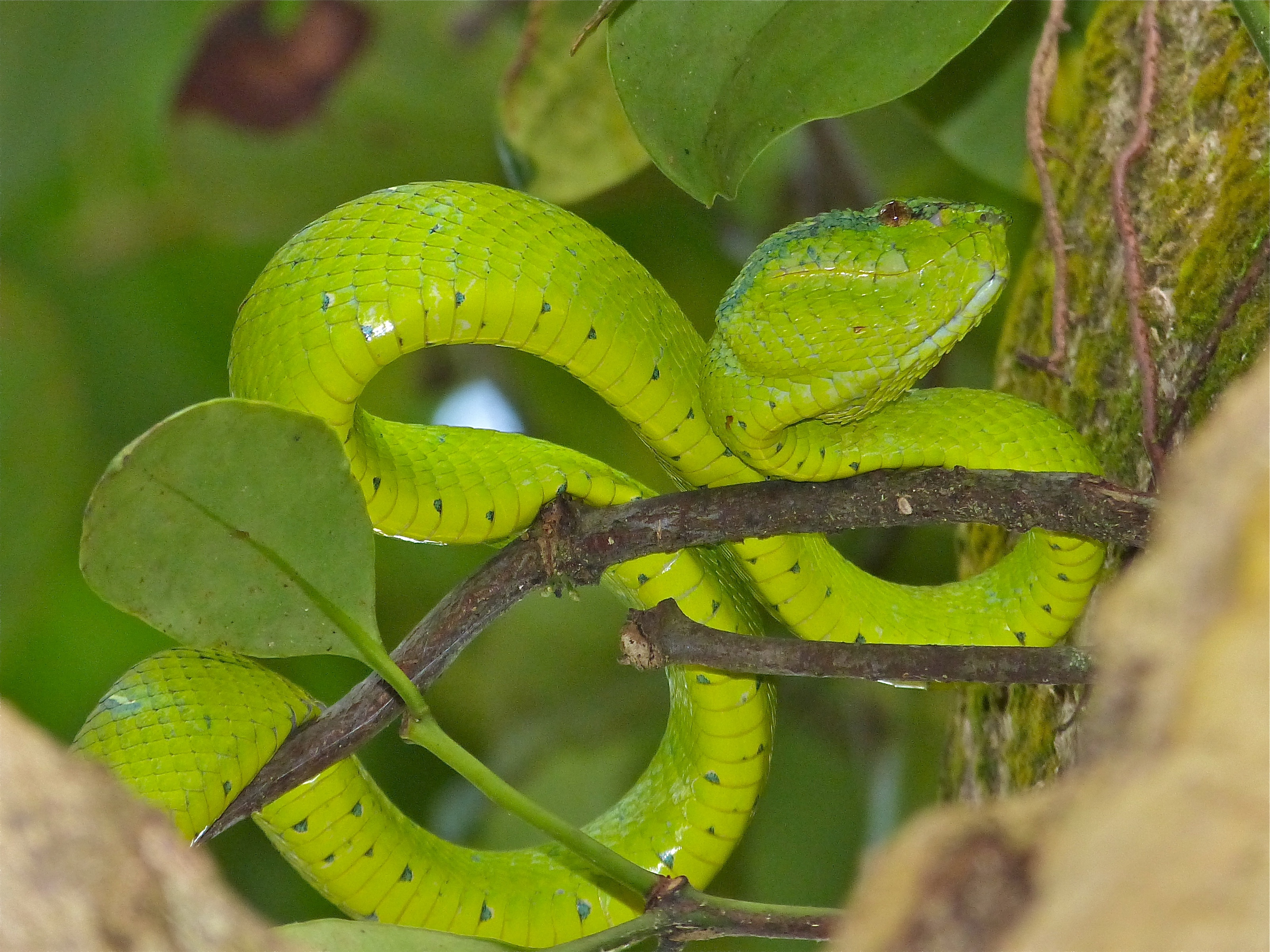

Conservation status
- Least Concern (IUCN 3.1)

Scientific classification
- Kingdom: Animalia
- Phylum: Chordata
- Order: Squamata
- Suborder: Serpentes
- Family: Viperidae
- Genus: Tropidolaemus
- Species: T. subannulatus

Binomial name
- Tropidolaemus subannulatus (Kuch et al., 2007)

= Tropidolaemus subannulatus =

Species of snake

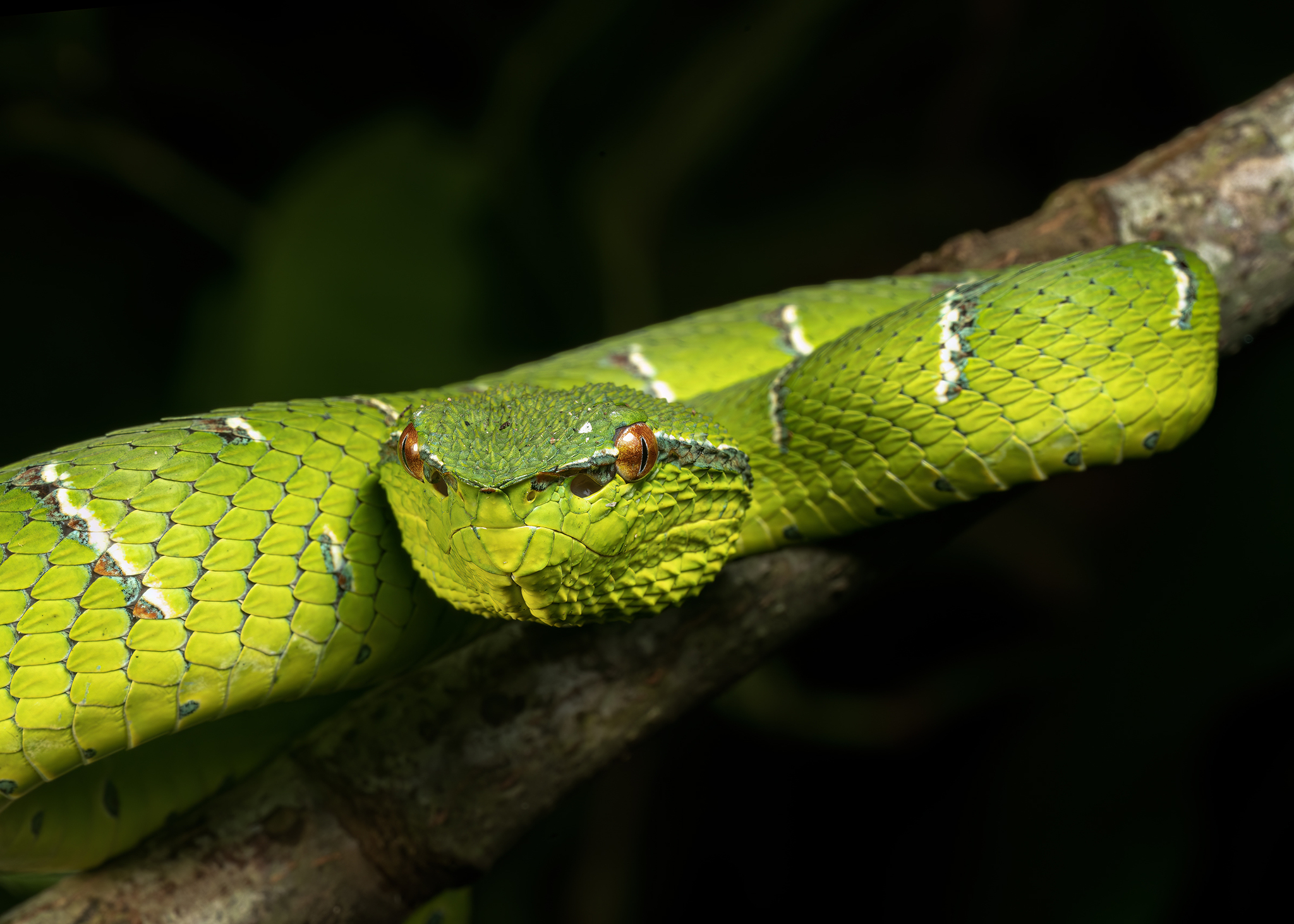
T. subannulatus

The Bornean keeled green pit viper or North Philippine temple pit viper (Tropidolaemus subannulatus) is a pit viper species native to Brunei, Indonesia, Malaysia, and the Philippines. Until 2007, this species was considered part of the Tropidolaemus wagleri species complex.

== Description ==
The Borneo Keeled Green Pit Viper can have a range of colors but generally it is bright green with numerous thin crossbands. Some localities have a mixture of light green to blue background colors. The bands are variable and can be a combination of blue, red or white. Females may have blue or red dots on their underbelly, while juveniles and males only have red dots. Females are much larger than males and can grow to a maximum size of 96 cm, while males can reach a size of 46 cm. This species is one of the most common species encountered in the lowland rainforests of Borneo. It is known to eat birds, small mammals and frogs. It is ovoviparous and gives birth to live young.

This species is arboreal, with a prehensile tail. It can be found in low level vegetation up to a height of 20m. Like many other arboreal snakes, this species has a disrupted green color to allow it excellent camouflage in the trees, hiding it from predators and prey.

== Venom ==
Although there are no published reports on this species' venom profile, it likely is similar to Tropidolaemus wagleri, since up until recently they were considered the same species. The venom of T. wagleri is unusual among members of the subfamily Crotalinae as it is predominantly neurotoxic, with a much smaller percentage of hemotoxic venom peptides. The danger of an envenomation from T. subannulatus is unknown, but bites from T. wagleri are not known to be fatal and envenomations are usually localized and rarely systemic. However, as with any venomous snake, use extreme caution around this species, since even non-lethal species can cause death from anaphylaxis.
