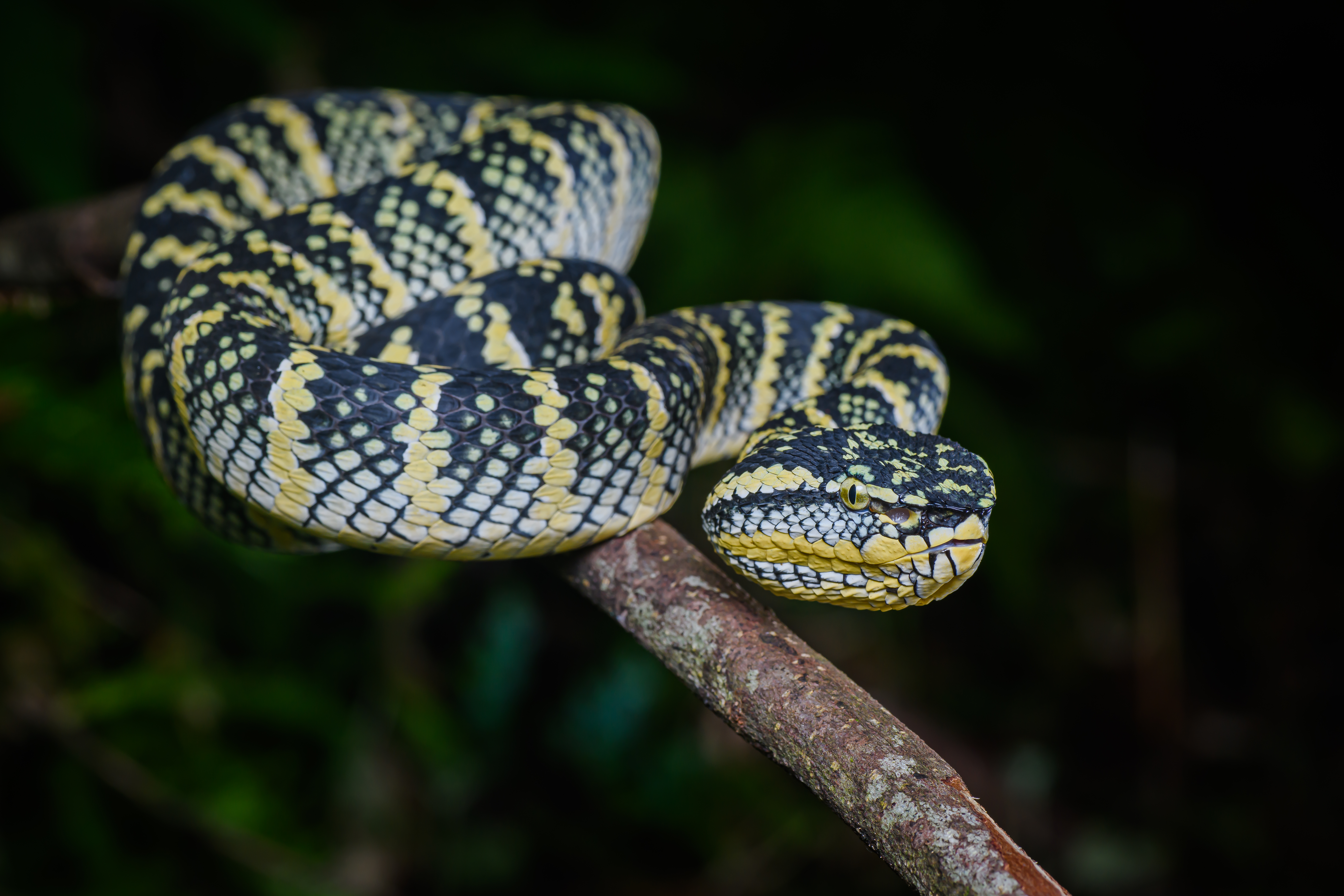
- Female of the species in Takua Pa, Thailand

Conservation status
- Least Concern (IUCN 3.1)

Scientific classification
- Kingdom: Animalia
- Phylum: Chordata
- Class: Reptilia
- Order: Squamata
- Suborder: Serpentes
- Family: Viperidae
- Genus: Tropidolaemus
- Species: T. wagleri

Binomial name
- Tropidolaemus wagleri (F. Boie, 1827)

Synonyms
- C[ophias]. Wagleri H. Boie, 1826 (nomen nudum); [Cophias] Wagleri F. Boie, 1827 (nomen conservandum); Tropidolaemus wagleri — Wagler, 1830; Trigonoc[ephalus]. wagleri — Schlegel, 1837; Trimesurus maculatus Gray, 1842; Trimesurus Philippensis Gray, 1842; Trimesurus subannulatus Gray, 1842; Trigonocephalus Wagleri var. Celebensis Gray, 1849; Trigonocephalus Wagleri var. Sumatrensis Gray, 1849; Tropidolaemus hombronii Guichenot In Jacquinot & Guichenot, 1853; Tropidolaemus wagleri — A.M.C. Duméril, Bibron & A.H.A. Duméril, 1854; Tropidolaemus hombroni — A.M.C. Duméril, Bibron & A.H.A. Duméril, 1854; Tropidolaemus Schlegelii Bleeker, 1857; T[rigonocephalus]. Hombroni — Jan, 1859; Tropidolaemus Philippensis — W. Peters, 1861; Tropidolaemus subannulatus — W. Peters, 1861; Trimeresurus wagleri — Günther, 1864; Tropidolaemus Schlegeli — Theobald, 1868; Tropidolaemus subannulatus var. celebensis — W. Peters, 1872; Tropidolaemus subannulatus var. immaculatus W. Peters, 1872; Bothrops Wagleri — F. Müller, 1880; Lachesis wagleri — Boulenger, 1896; Trimeresurus wagleri alboviridis Taylor, 1917; Trimeresurus philippensis — Taylor, 1922; Trimeresurus wagleri wagleri — Taylor, 1922; Trimeresurus wagleri philippensis — Taylor, 1922; Trimeresurus wagleri subannulatus — Taylor, 1922; [Bothrops] philippensis — Maslin, 1942; Tropidolaemus wagleri — Hoge & Romano-Hoge, 1981; Tropidolaemus philippinensis — David & Vogel, 1996; Trimesurus [sic] philippinensis — David & Vogel, 1996 (ex errore); Trimeresurus philippinensis — David & Vogel, 1996; Tropidolaemus wagleri — David & Vogel, 1996

= Tropidolaemus wagleri =

Species of snake

Tropidolaemus wagleri, more commonly known as Wagler's pit viper, is a species of venomous snake, a pit viper in the subfamily Crotalinae of the family Viperidae. The species is endemic to Southeast Asia. There are no subspecies that are recognized as being valid. It is sometimes referred to as the temple viper because of its abundance around the Temple of the Azure Cloud in Malaysia.

== Etymology ==
The specific name, wagleri, is in honour of German herpetologist Johann Georg Wagler.

== Description ==
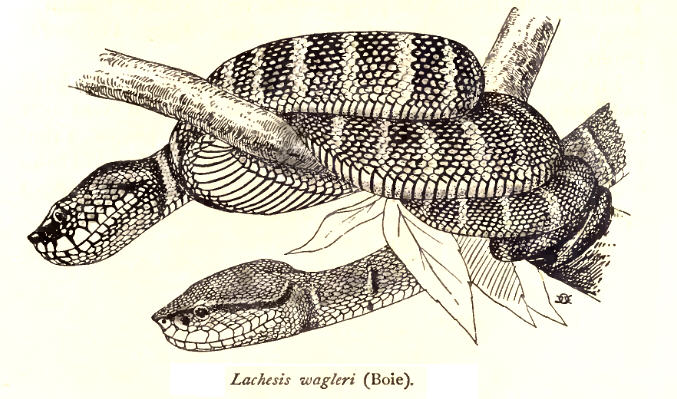

The Wagler's pit viper is sexually dimorphic: the females grow to approximately 1 m (39 1/4 in) in total length (including tail), their bodies being black with yellow stripes. Males, on the other hand, typically do not exceed 75 cm (29 1/2 in). Males have large triangular-shaped heads, with relatively thin green bodies. They are almost entirely arboreal, and their tails are prehensile to aid in climbing.

They are found in a wide variety of colors and patterns, often referred to as "phases". In the past, some researchers classified the different phases as subspecies. The phases vary greatly from having a black or brown coloration as a base, with orange and yellow banding, to others having a light green as the base color, with yellow or orange banding, and many variations therein.

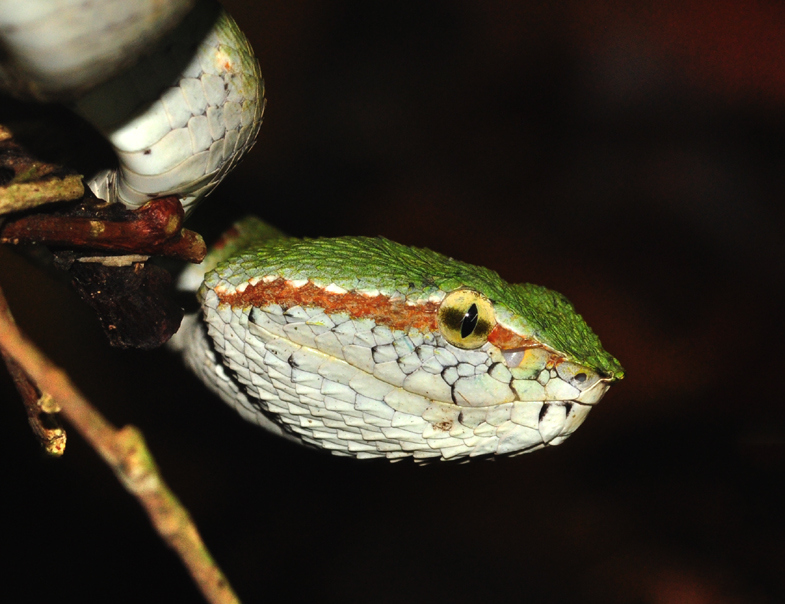
Lateral view of an adult male's head.

== Common names ==
Common names for the Wagler's pit viper include temple viper, temple pit viper, bamboo snake, temple snake, speckled pit viper, and temple pitviper.

== Geographic range ==
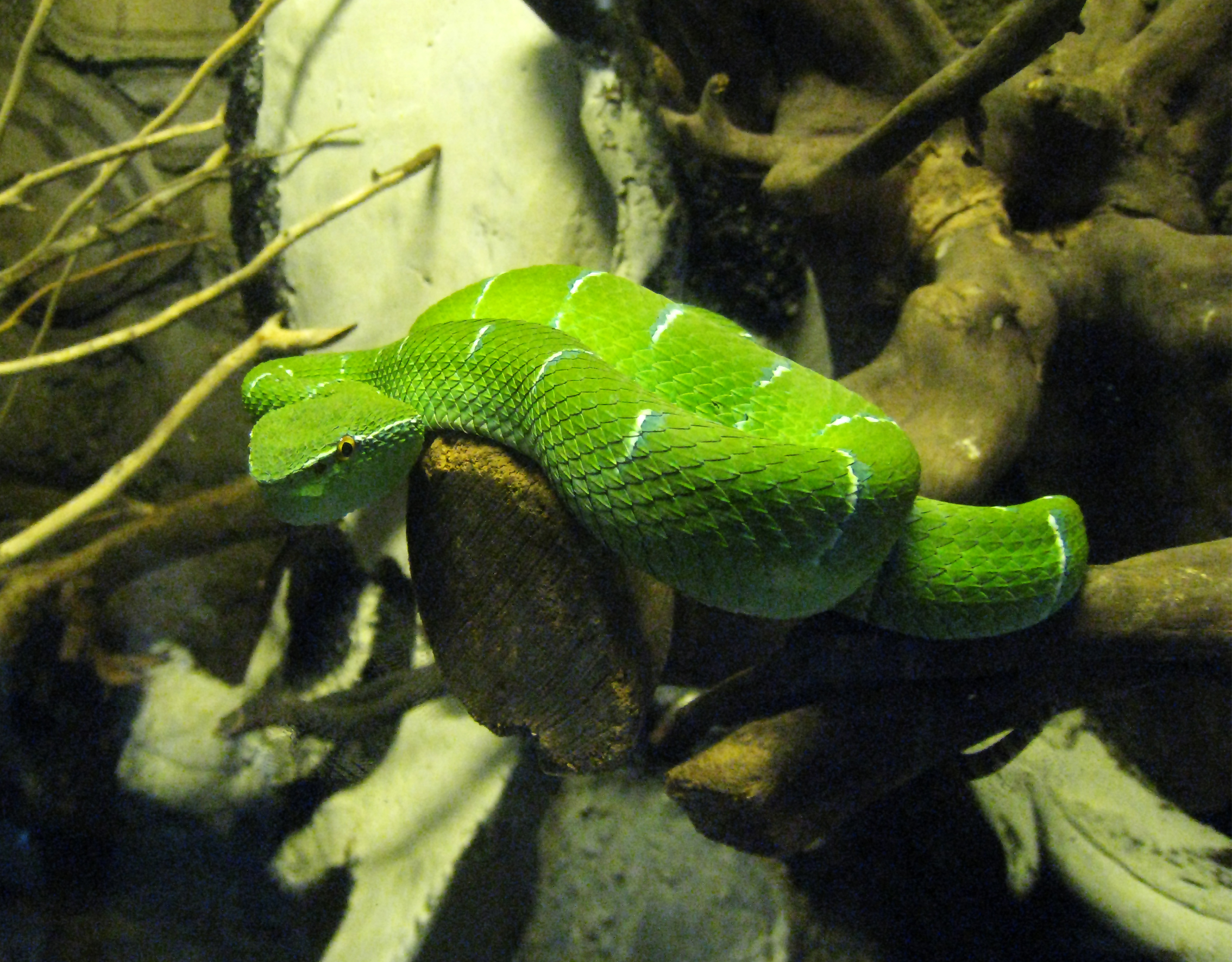
A green phase of Wagler's pit viper in a terrarium of Reptile Park, Taman Mini Indonesia Indah, Jakarta, Indonesia.

The Wagler's pit viper is found in southern Vietnam from the provinces of Minh Hai and Song Be, in southern Thailand recorded from the provinces of Phang Nga, Phuket, Pattani, Surat Thani, Nakhon Si Tammarat, Narathiwat, and Yala, probably distributed throughout the Peninsula in west Malaysia, as well as the island of Penang, in Singapore and in Indonesia on Sumatra, the islands of the Riau Archipelago, Bangka, Billiton, Nias, the Mentawai Islands (Siberut), Natuna, and Karimata. In a revision by Vogel et al (2007), the Wagler's pit viper species complex was differentiated into several taxa, including the resurrection of T. subannulatus. The Western Philippine populations belong to T. subannulatus, but those from Mindanao include snakes assigned to both this species and T. philippensis. Tropidolaemus subannulatus has a wide distribution in Central Indonesia, Malaysia and Philippines, the Wagler's Pit Viper is restricted to mainland Southeast Asia, down to Sumatra and Bangka, West Indonesia."

== Habitat ==
The preferred natural habitat of the Wagler's pit viper is the forest, at altitudes from sea level to 400 m (1,300 ft).

== Behavior ==
Nocturnal and arboreal, the Wagler's pit viper appears quite sluggish, as it remains motionless for long periods of time waiting for prey to pass by. When prey does pass by, or if disturbed, it can strike quickly.

== Feeding ==
The primary diet of the Wagler's pit viper consists of rodents, birds, and lizards. The pits, one on each side of the head between the eye and the nostril, are capable of detecting temperature difference of as little as 0.003 of a degree Celsius (0.0054 of a degree Fahrenheit).

== Reproduction ==
Sexually mature females of the Wagler's pit viper bear live young by ovoviviparity. Litter size varies from 15 to 41.

== Venom ==
The venom of the Wagler's pit viper contains four novel peptides (Waglerins 1-4). The Waglerins produce fatal respiratory paralysis of adult mice. An initial study indicated that micromolar concentrations of Waglerin 1 act both pre- and postsynaptically to inhibit transmission across rat neuromuscular junctions. However, Waglerin-1 is a more potent inhibitor of transmission across the mouse neuromuscular junction. A subsequent study demonstrated that Waglerin-1 inhibited the adult mouse endplate response to acetylcholine with an IC50 of 50 nanomolar. In striking contrast, transmission across neuromuscular junctions of neonatal or transgenic mice lacking the adult acetylcholine receptor was not altered by micromolar concentrations of Waglerin-1. Biochemical studies demonstrated that the exquisite selectivity of Waglerin-1 for the adult mouse acetylcholine receptor relies upon several amino acid residues unique to the epsilon subunit of the adult mouse acetylcholine receptor. Waglerin-1's selectivity for the epsilon-subunit containing acetylcholine receptor of adult mice is complemented by selectivity of small peptide toxins purified from the venom of Conus geographus and Conus pergrandis for the gamma-subunit containing acetylcholine receptor of neonatal skeletal muscle. The Waglerins and complementary conotoxins are useful tools to discover the contribution of acetylcholine receptor subunits to synaptogenesis. In addition, study of the Waglerins and related toxic peptides may lead to the discovery of novel molecular targets for drug development. While Waglerin-1 interacts with other members of the ligand-gated superfamily of ion channels, the potency is much less than for inhibition of the adult mouse muscle acetylcholine receptor. Structural study suggests that Waglerin-1 may undergo molecular rearrangement that allows for binding to multiple receptors. The actions of Waglerin-1 reverse upon removal of the peptide.

Waglerin-1 is included in some skin creams marketed as wrinkle removers. There is no scientific evidence supporting the manufacturers' suggestion that the Waglerin-1 included in their products relaxes wrinkle producing skeletal muscles.

== Taxonomy ==
The Wagler's pit viper has undergone much taxonomic reclassification over the years and was previously placed in the genus Trimeresurus. However, its distinctly different morphology and venom characteristics set it apart, so that eventually a new genus was erected in which it was placed together with Hutton's viper, Tropidolaemus huttoni.
