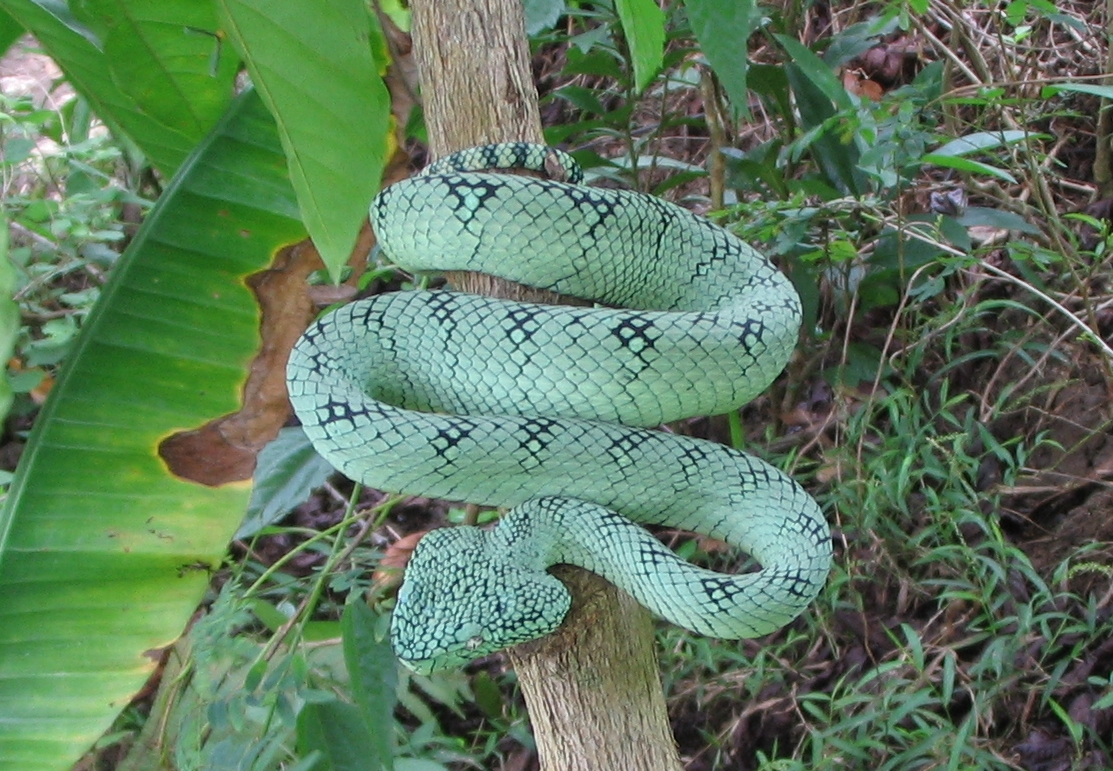

Scientific classification
- Kingdom: Animalia
- Phylum: Chordata
- Class: Reptilia
- Order: Squamata
- Suborder: Serpentes
- Family: Viperidae
- Genus: Tropidolaemus
- Species: T. philippensis

Binomial name
- Tropidolaemus philippensis (Gray, 1842)

Synonyms
- Trimeresurus philippensis Gray, 1842; Trimeresurus hombroni Jacquinot and Guichenot, 1848; Tropidolaemus philippinensis – unjustified emendation

= Tropidolaemus philippensis =

Species of snake

Tropidolaemus philippensis is a species of venomous snake in the subfamily Crotalinae, the pit vipers. It is endemic to western Mindanao and some portions of western Leyte, the Philippines. Its common name is South Philippine temple pit viper.

Tropidolaemus philippensis is viviparous. Males have a greenish-turquoise body background coloration, whereas females are seemingly more green. There is a black or rarely white postocular stripe. Body has dorsal blotches that are black with unfilled dorsal scales, giving raise so degree of net-like pattern. Tail is moderate.

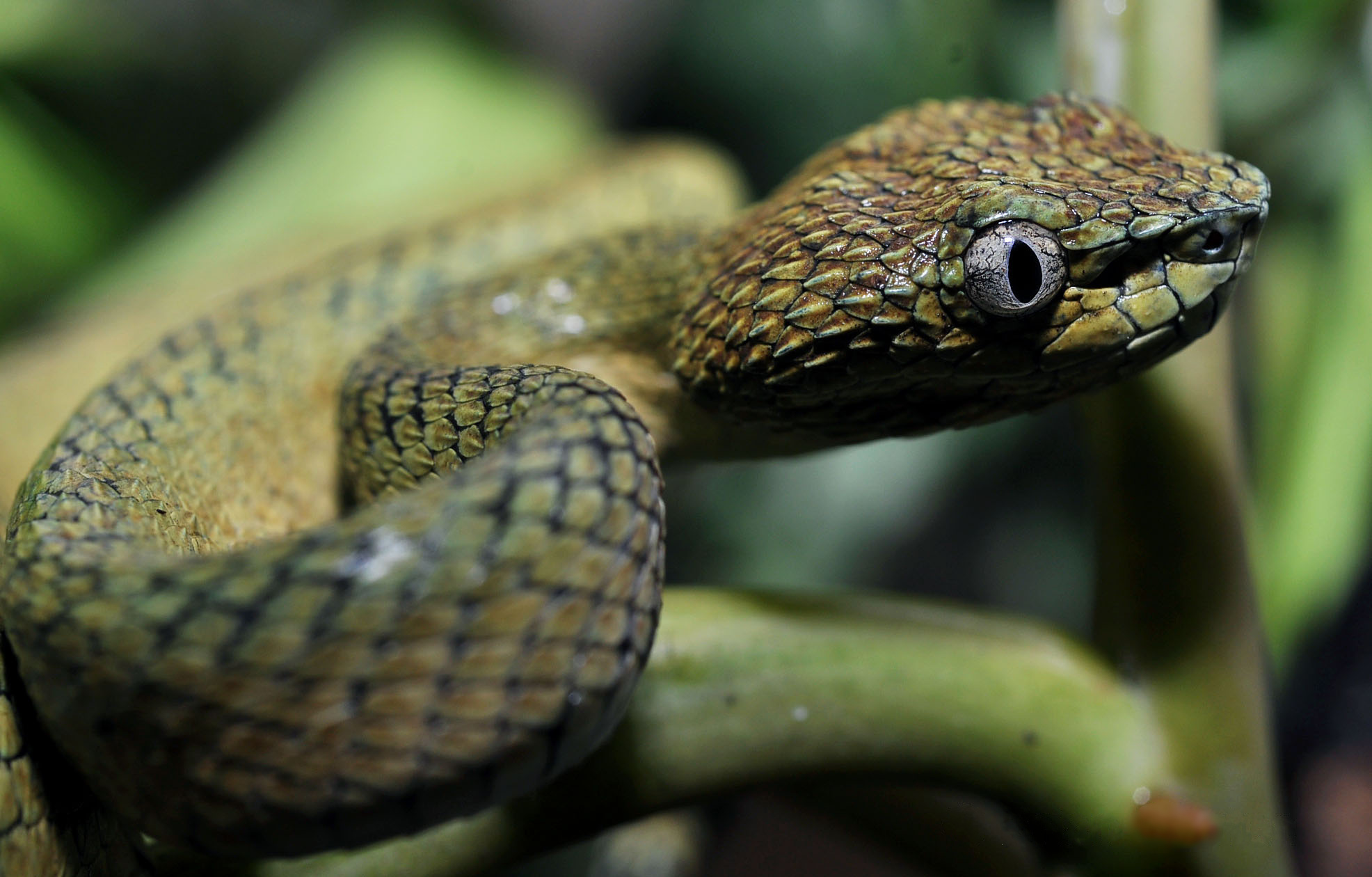
Tropidolaemus philippensis

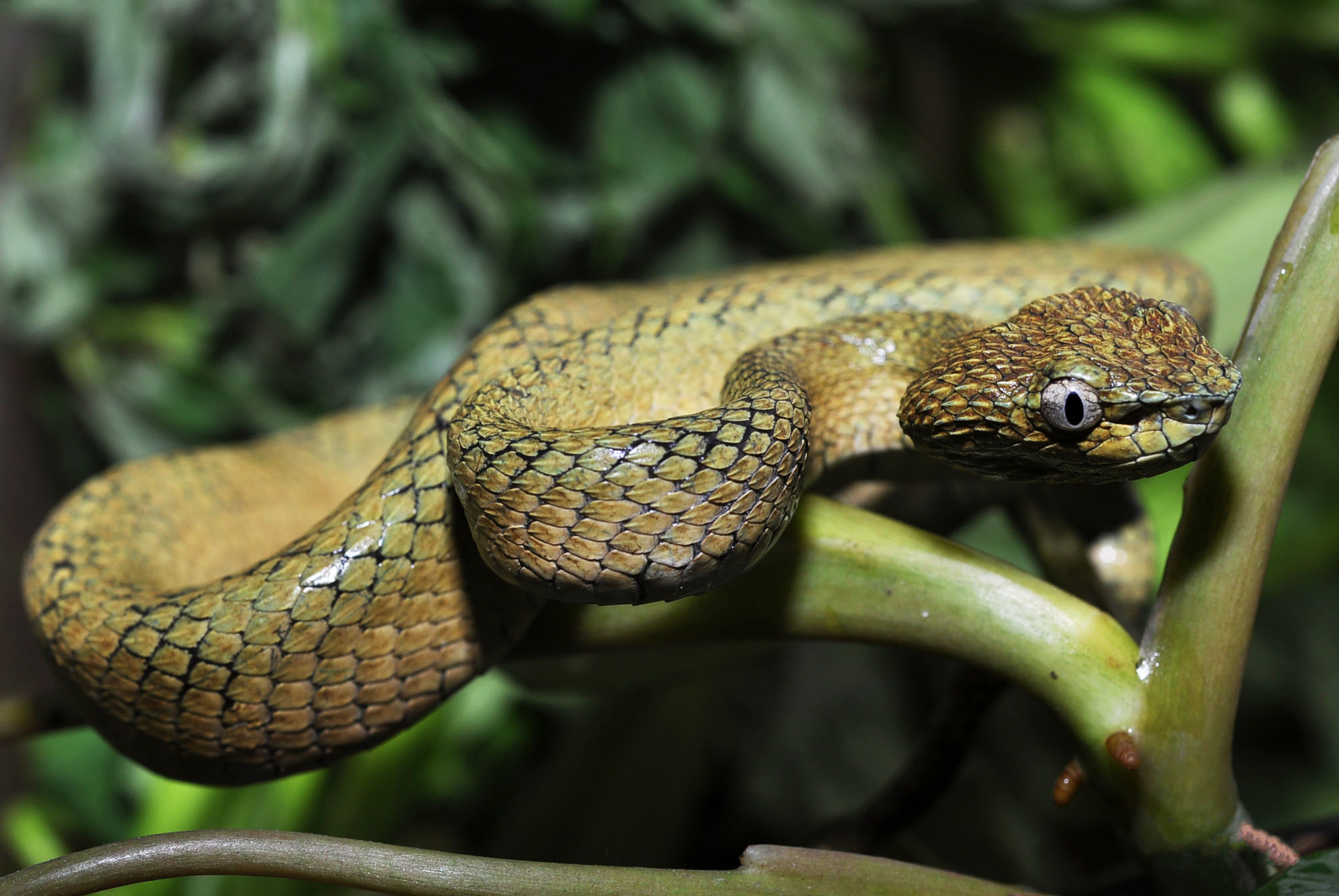
Tropidolaemus philippensis
