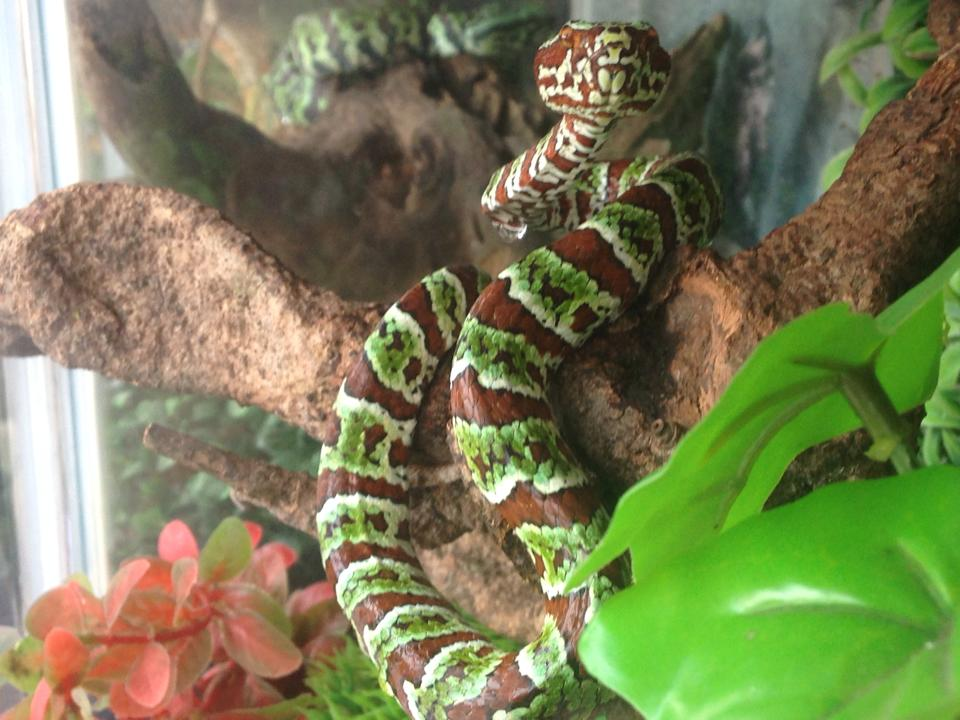

Scientific classification
- Kingdom: Animalia
- Phylum: Chordata
- Class: Reptilia
- Order: Squamata
- Suborder: Serpentes
- Family: Viperidae
- Genus: Tropidolaemus
- Species: T. laticinctus

Binomial name
- Tropidolaemus laticinctus (Kuch, Gumprecht, and Melaun, 2007)

Synonyms
- Trimeresurus laticinctus Kuch, Gumprecht, and Melaun, 2007

= Tropidolaemus laticinctus =

Species of snake

Tropidolaemus laticinctus is a species of venomous snake in the pit viper subfamily, Crotalinae. Its common names are Sulawesi pit viper, broad-banded temple pitviper, or broad-banded pit viper. It is endemic to the Indonesian island of Sulawesi.

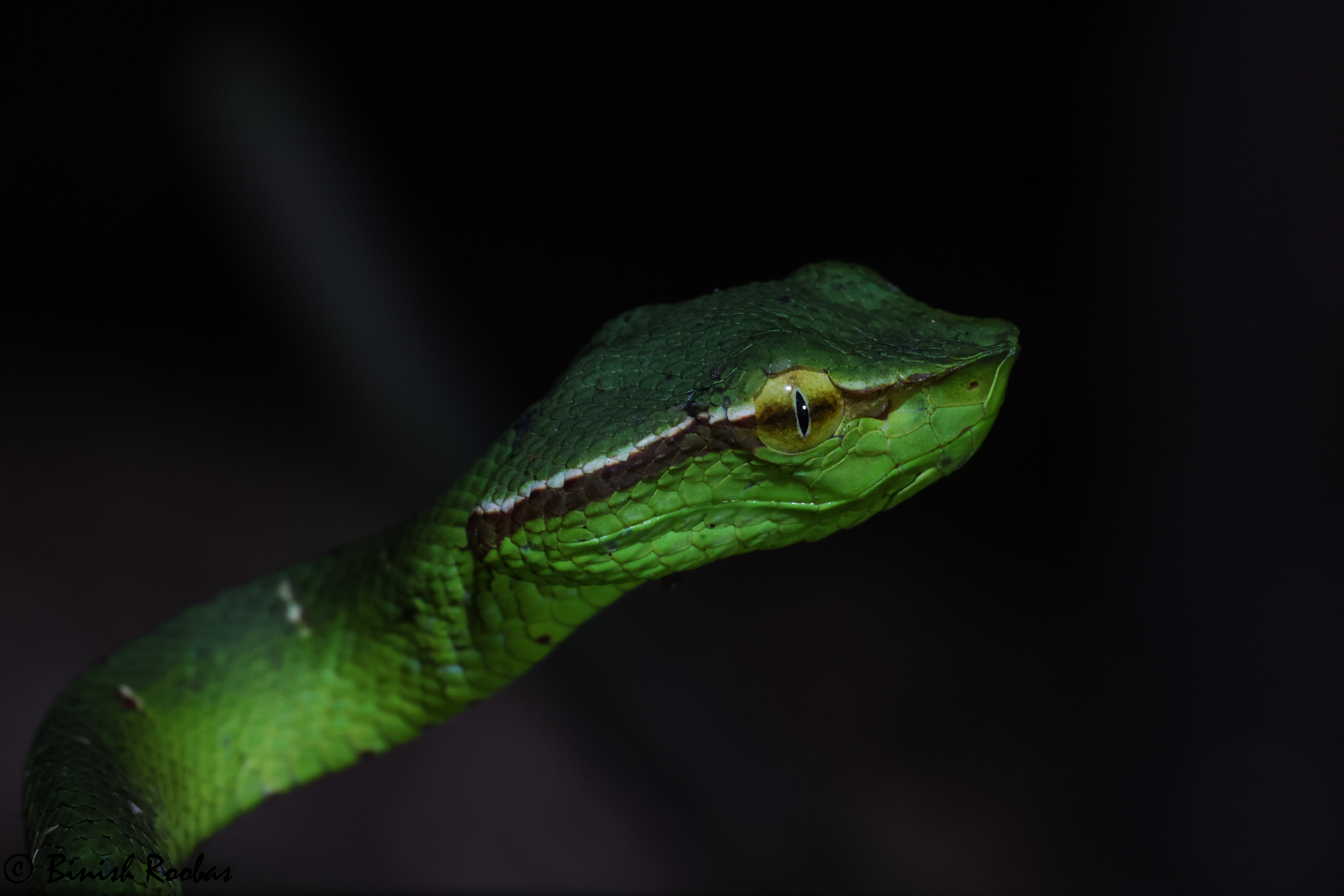
Sulawesi Pit Viper from Tangkoko National Park

== Description ==
Unlike other temple viper species, this species lacks age-related and sexually dimorphic coloration.
