= Angus Finlay Hutton =

British naturalist

Angus Finlay Hutton (8 April 1928 – 30 October 2016) was a British naturalist born in India. Working in the High Wavy range, he discovered a species of pit viper that is now named after him as Hutton's pit viper (Tropidolaemus huttoni). He also collected a species of bat that was later named as Salim Ali's fruit bat (Latidens salimali) after Indian ornithologist Salim Ali. Until his death is 2016, Hutton was the oldest living member of the Bombay Natural History Society (BNHS). He helped set up butterfly gardens in Southeast Asia before settling in Queensland, Australia.

== Life and work ==
Hutton was born in Mysore on 8 April 1928. His father had served in World War I and came to South India to work with a large British Tea Estate in 1921. He was sent back to Britain at the age of eight but returned to India when the Second World War broke out. He then studied at a number of schools, completing his matriculation in 1944 from Bishop Cotton Boys' School in Bangalore. He then went to Lawrence Memorial Royal Military College in Ooty. At 16 he joined the Southern Provinces Mounted Rifles (AFI Cavalry) and because of his knowledge of Tamil was placed in the South Indian Labour Units with the Madras Sappers & Miners. After the war he joined the tea plantations at Karamallai Estate working under C.R.T. Congreve. He later moved to the High Wavy Mountains to work as an assistant with Tea Estates India Ltd. which was owned by Brooke Bonds. After meeting Salim Ali who was then conducting a bird survey, he joined the Bombay Natural History Society on 29 November 1945 and, until his death in 2016, was the oldest living member and only "Diamond" member. He moved to Uganda in 1952, then to Kenya and Papua New Guinea before settling in Queensland. He set up a butterfly farming venture in Papua New Guinea.

In Queensland, Hutton established a farm near Gympie, a large part of which was later gazetted as the Mt Monty Nature Refuge. As well as operating his own farm, he helped establish one of Australia's first Landcare groups in 1988 and worked as the Gympie district's produce inspector for the Queensland Department of Primary Industries. He was also a leader in establishing one of Australia's first integrated catchment management organizations - the Mary River Catchment Planning Association. The Gympie and Districts Landcare Group centre and nursery is named in his honour.

Hutton died in Maleny on 30 October 2016 from heart failure, two years after the death of his wife Gem, his partner of over 60 years.

== Discoveries ==
In 1948 Hutton collected a species of bat which had been preserved in the collection of the BNHS, misidentified as the common short-nosed fruit bat. The specimen was re-examined later by Kitti Thonglongya who recognised it as a new species that was named as Latidens salimali after Salim Ali. Salim Ali's fruit bat is considered as one of the rarest fruit bats in the world even entering the Guinness Book of World Records in 1993 for its rarity.

In 1949 Malcolm Smith described a new species of viper from two specimens collected by Hutton. It is now called Hutton's pitviper Tropidolaemus huttoni (Smith, 1949) and is one of the rarer species of pit vipers. First described from two juveniles found in the High Wavy Mountains, it has not been seen in the wild since. Earlier included in the genus Trimeresurus, it is now the only species of temple pit viper, genus Tropidolaemus, outside its main distribution range in the Malay Peninsula.

Hutton also collected the rare long-haired brown hyena in Kenya.
