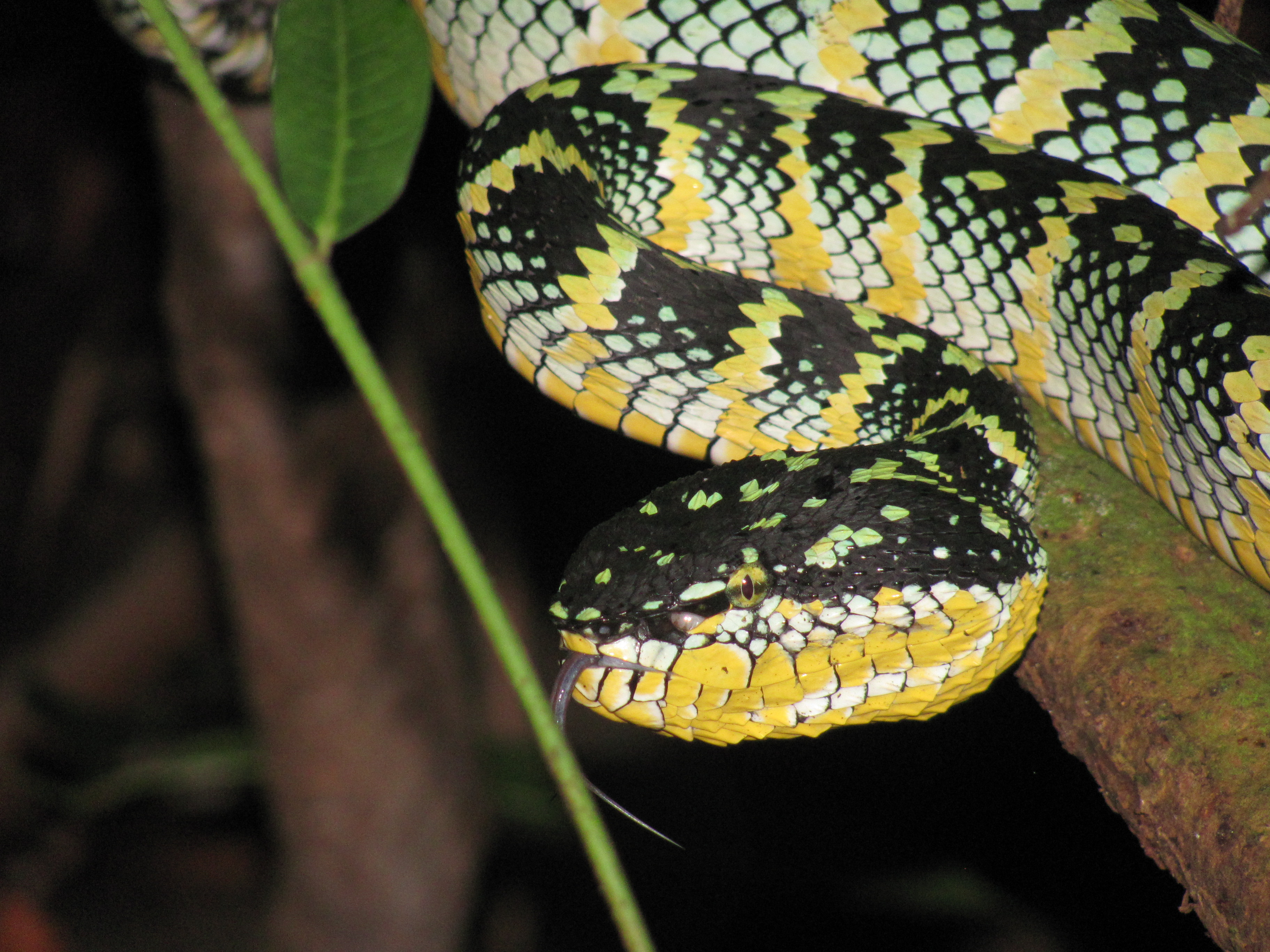
- Wagler's viper, T. wagleri

Scientific classification
- Kingdom: Animalia
- Phylum: Chordata
- Class: Reptilia
- Order: Squamata
- Suborder: Serpentes
- Family: Viperidae
- Subfamily: Crotalinae
- Genus: Tropidolaemus; Wagler, 1830

Type species
- Tropidolaemus wagleri

= Tropidolaemus =

Genus of snakes

Tropidolaemus, the temple pit vipers, is a genus of pit vipers in the subfamily Crotalinae of the family Viperidae. Member species are native to southern India and Southeast Asia. Five species are recognised as being valid, and none of these species has subspecies.

== Description ==
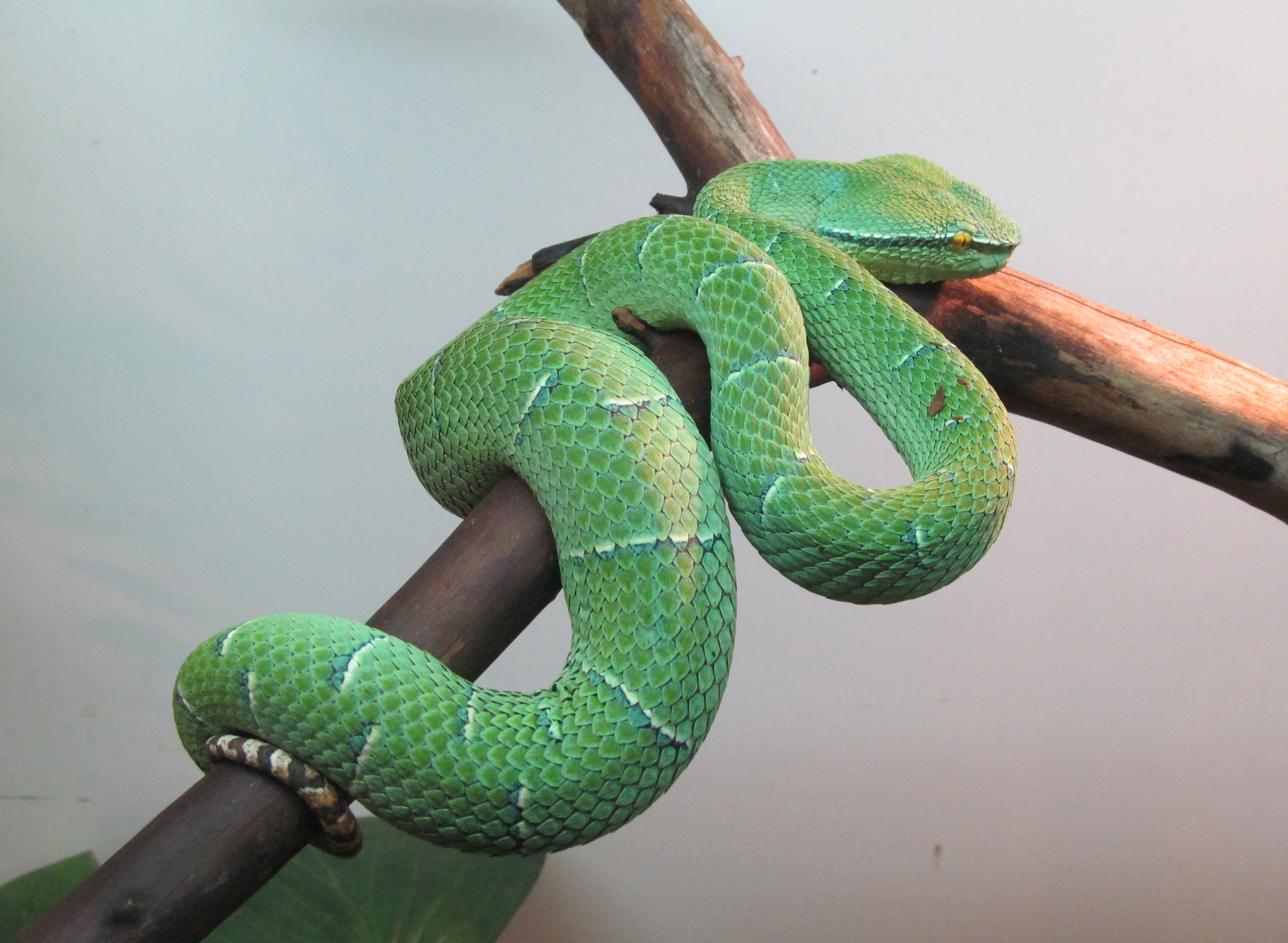
Tropidolaemus subannulatus

Tropidolaemus are sexually dimorphic. Females grow much larger than males. Females can reach about 1 meter long, or over 39 inches. Males usually only grow to about 75 cm, or around 29 and a half inches. These snakes have a unique head shape. Their heads are broad and shaped like triangles. Their bodies are relatively thin compared to their head. This makes them easy to spot.

They are found in a wide variety of colours and patterns, which are often referred to as "phases". Some sources even classify the different phases as subspecies. Phases vary greatly from having a black or brown colouration as a base, with orange and yellow banding, to others having a light green as the base colour, with yellow or orange banding, and many variations therein.

== Geographic range ==
Tropidolaemus is native to southern India and Southeast Asia.

== Behaviour ==
These species are primarily arboreal, and are excellent climbers. They spend most of their time nearly motionless, in wait for prey to pass by. They may be diurnal or nocturnal, with their activity period depending on the temperature.

== Feeding ==
The diet includes small mammals, birds, lizards and frogs.

== Reproduction ==
The average litter consists of between twelve and fifteen young, with the neonates measuring 12–15 cm (4 3/4-5 7/8 inches) in total length.

== Species ==
Image	Species	Common name	Geographic range
	T. huttoni (M.A. Smith, 1949)	Hutton's pit viper	The High Wavy Mountains in Madurai district, southern India.
	T. laticinctus (Kuch, Gumprecht & Melaun, 2007)	Broad-banded temple pit viper	Indonesia on the island of Sulawesi.
	T. philippensis (Gray, 1842)	South Philippine temple pit viper	Philippines (western Mindanao)
	T. subannulatus (Gray, 1842)	Bornean keeled green pit viper	Brunei, Indonesia, Malaysia, and the Philippines
	T. wagleri^{T} (F. Boie, 1827)	Wagler's pit viper	Southern Thailand and West Malaysia. In Indonesia on Sumatra and the nearby islands of the Riau Archipelago, Bangka, Billiton, Nias, the Mentawai Islands (Siberut), Natuna, Karimata, Borneo (Sabah, Sarawak, Kalimantan), Sulawesi and Buton.

^{T} Type species.

Nota bene: A binomial authority in parentheses indicates that the species was originally described in a genus other than Tropidolaemus.

== Taxonomy ==
Two species here were once classified as Trimeresurus, but were given their own genus due to distinct morphological characteristics.

One new species, T. laticinctus, was described recently by Kuch, Gumprecht and Melaun (2007). It is found on the Indonesian island of Sulawesi. The type locality is "between L. Posso and Tomini Bay, Celebes" [= between Lake Poso and Tomini Bay, Province of Sulawesi Tengah, Indonesia]."
