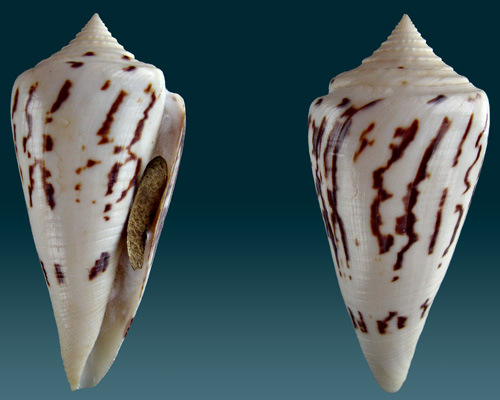
- Apertural and abapertural views of shell of Conus pergrandis (Iredale, T., 1937)
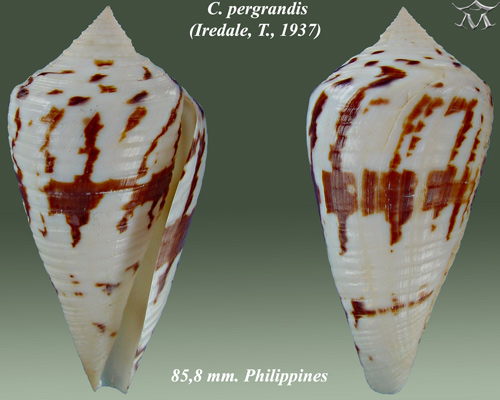

Scientific classification
- Kingdom: Animalia
- Phylum: Mollusca
- Class: Gastropoda
- Subclass: Caenogastropoda
- Order: Neogastropoda
- Superfamily: Conoidea
- Family: Conidae
- Genus: Conus
- Species: C. pergrandis

Binomial name
- Conus pergrandis (Iredale, 1937)

Synonyms
- Asprella pergrandis (Iredale, 1937); Conus (Embrikena) pergrandis (Iredale, 1937) · accepted, alternate representation; Conus (Embrikena) potusmarumai Kosuge, 1980; Conus fletcheri Petuch & Mendenhall, 1972; Conus potusmarumai Kosuge, 1981; Embrikena pergrandis Iredale, 1937 (original combination); Embrikena potusmarumai Kosuge, 1980

= Conus pergrandis =

Species of sea snail

Conus pergrandis, common name the grand cone, is a species of sea snail, a marine gastropod mollusk in the family Conidae, the cone snails and their allies.

Like all species within the genus Conus, these snails are predatory and venomous. They are capable of stinging humans, therefore live ones should be handled carefully or not at all.

== Description ==
The size of the shell varies between 73 mm and 161 mm.

== Distribution ==
This marine species occurs off Taiwan, Indo-China, Indo-Malaysia, New Caledonia, Papua New Guinea, Philippines, the Western Pacific and Queensland, Australia.
