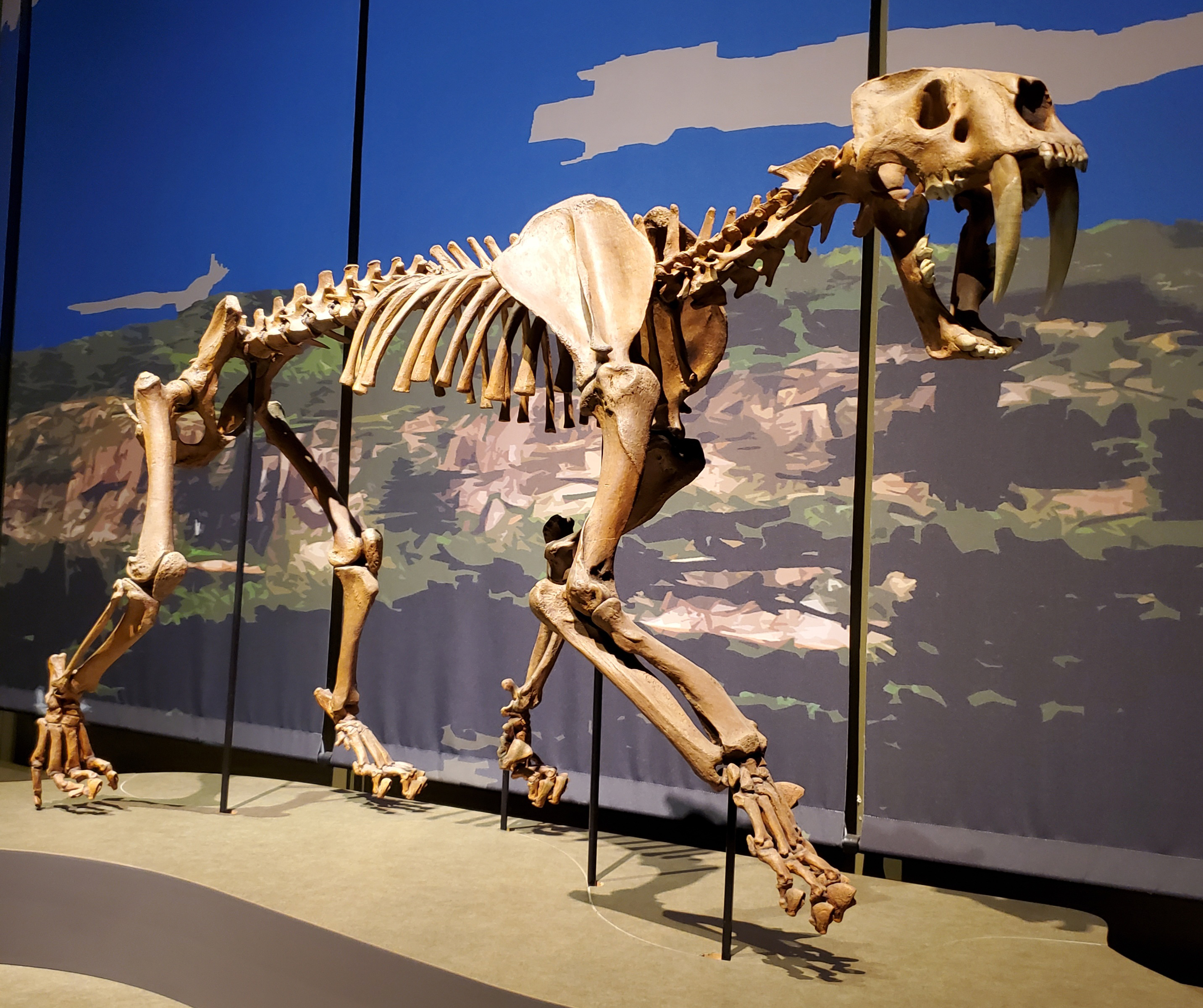
- Mounted S. populator skeleton at Tellus Science Museum

Scientific classification
- Kingdom: Animalia
- Phylum: Chordata
- Class: Mammalia
- Order: Carnivora
- Family: Felidae
- Subfamily: †Machairodontinae
- Tribe: †Smilodontini
- Genus: †Smilodon; Lund, 1842

Type species
- †Smilodon populator Lund, 1842

Other species
- †S. fatalis (Leidy, 1869); †S. gracilis Cope, 1880

Synonyms
- Genus synonymy: Munifelis Muñis, 1845; Trucifelis Leidy, 1868; Smilodontopsis Brown, 1908; Prosmilodon Rusconi, 1929; Smilodontidion Kraglievich, 1948; Species synonymy: S. populator: Munifelis bonaerensis Muñis, 1845; Smilodon blainvillii Desmarest, 1860; Machaerodus bonaerensis Burmeister, 1867; Machaerodus necator Gervais, 1878; Smilodon ensenadensis Ameghino, 1888; Machaerodus ensenadensis Ameghino, 1889; Smilodon crucians Ameghino, 1904; Smilodon bonaerensis Ameghino, 1907; Smilodon neogaeus ensenadensis Boule & Thévenin, 1920; Smilodon (Prosmilodon) ensenadensis Rusconi, 1929; Smilodon neogaeus de Paula Couto, 1940; Smilodon necator de Paula Couto, 1940; Smilodon (Prosmilodon) ensenadensis ferox Kraglievich, 1947; Smilodon (Prosmilodon) ensenadensis minor Kraglievich, 1948; Smilodontidion riggii Kraglievich, 1948; Machaerodus neogaeus Pictet, 1953; Felis smilodon Desmarest, 1953; Smilodon populator populator de Paula Couto, 1955; S. fatalis: Felis (Trucifelis) fatalis Leidy, 1868; Trucifelis fatalis Leidy, 1869; Machaerodus fatalis Lydekker, 1884; Drepanodon floridanus Leidy, 1889; Machaerodus floridanus Leidy, 1889; Uncia mercerii Cope, 1895; Smilodon floridanus Adams, 1896; Machaerodus (Smilodon) mercerii Cope, 1899; Smilodon californicus Bovard, 1907; Smilodontopsis troglodytes Brown, 1908; Smilodontopsis conardi Brown, 1908; Smilodontopsis mercerii Brown, 1908; Smilodon nebraskensis Matthew, 1918; Machaerodus mercerii Matthew, 1918; Smilodon (Trucifelis) californicus Merriam & Stock, 1932; Smilodon (Trucifelis) fatalis Merriam & Stock, 1932; Smilodon (Trucifelis) nebraskensis Merriam & Stock, 1932; Smilodon (Trucifelis) californicus brevipes Merriam & Stock, 1932; Smilodon trinitensis Slaughter, 1960; S. gracilis: Machaerodus (Smilodon) gracilis Cope, 1899; Smilodon (Smilodontopsis) gracilis Merriam & Stock, 1932; Megantereon gracilis Broom & Schepers 1946; Ischyrosmilus gracilis Churcher, 1984; Smilodontopsis gracilis Berta, 1995

= Smilodon =

Smilodon Temporal range: Early Pleistocene to Early Holocene, 2.5–0.0082 Ma

Extinct genus of saber-toothed cat

Smilodon is a genus of extinct felids. It is one of the best-known saber-toothed predators and prehistoric mammals. Although commonly known as the saber-toothed tiger, it was not closely related to the tiger or other modern cats, belonging to the extinct subfamily Machairodontinae, with an estimated date of divergence from the ancestor of living cats around 20 million years ago. Smilodon was one of the last surviving machairodonts alongside Homotherium. Smilodon lived in the Americas during the Pleistocene to early Holocene epoch (2.5 mya – at latest 8,200 years ago). The genus was named in 1842 based on fossils from Brazil; the generic name means 'scalpel' or 'two-edged knife' combined with 'tooth'. Three species are recognized today: S. gracilis, S. fatalis, and S. populator. The two latter species were probably descended from S. gracilis, which itself probably evolved from Megantereon. The hundreds of specimens obtained from the La Brea Tar Pits in Los Angeles constitute the largest collection of Smilodon fossils.

Overall, Smilodon was more robustly built than any extant cat, with particularly well-developed forelimbs and exceptionally long upper canine teeth. Its jaw had a bigger gape than that of modern cats, and its upper canines were slender and fragile, being adapted for precision killing. S. gracilis was the smallest species at 55 to 100 kg (121 to 220 lb) in weight. S. fatalis had a weight of 160 to 280 kg (350 to 620 lb) and height of 100 cm (39 in) and body length of 175 cm (69 in). Both of these species are mainly known from North America, but remains from South America have also been attributed to them (primarily from the northwest of the continent). S. populator from South America was the largest species, at 220 to 470 kg (490 to 1,040 lb) in weight and 120 cm (47 in) in height, and was among the largest known felids. The coat pattern of Smilodon is unknown, but it has been artistically restored with plain or spotted patterns.

In North America, Smilodon hunted large herbivores such as bison and camels, and it remained successful even when encountering new prey taxa in South America such as Macrauchenia and ground sloths. Smilodon is thought to have killed its prey by holding it still with its forelimbs and biting it, but in what manner the bite itself was delivered is unclear. Scientists debate whether Smilodon had a social or a solitary lifestyle; analysis of modern predator behavior, as well as of Smilodon's fossil remains, could be construed to lend support to either view. Smilodon probably lived in relatively closed habitats such as forests and bush, which would have provided cover for ambushing prey, although S. populator has been suggested to have hunted in open terrain. Smilodon died out as part of the end-Pleistocene extinction event, which occurred around 13,000-9,000 years ago, along with most other large animals across the Americas. Its reliance on large animals has been proposed as the cause of its extinction. Smilodon may have been impacted by habitat turnover and loss of prey on which it specialized, due to possible climatic impacts, the effects of recently arrived humans on prey populations, and other factors.

== Taxonomy ==
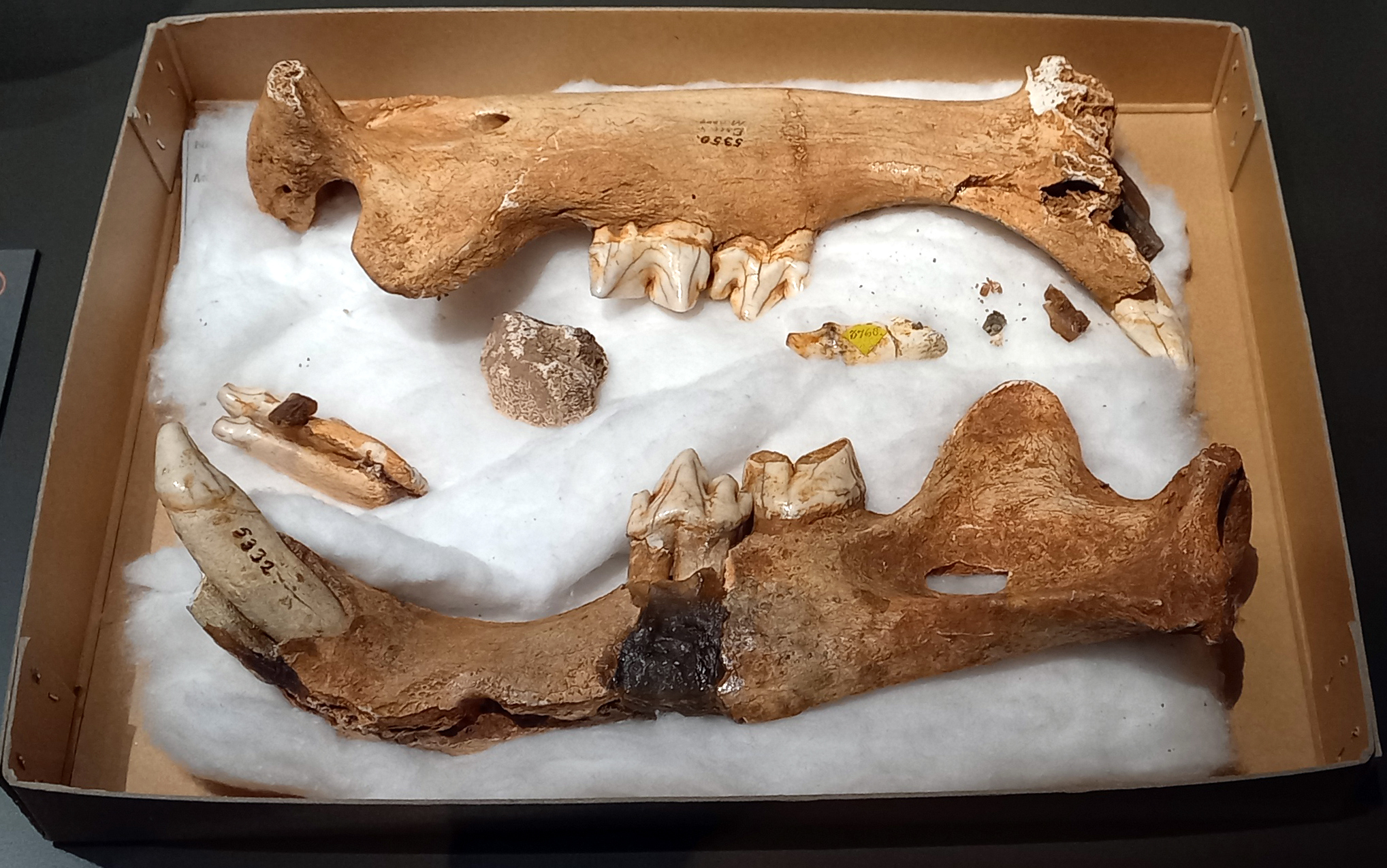
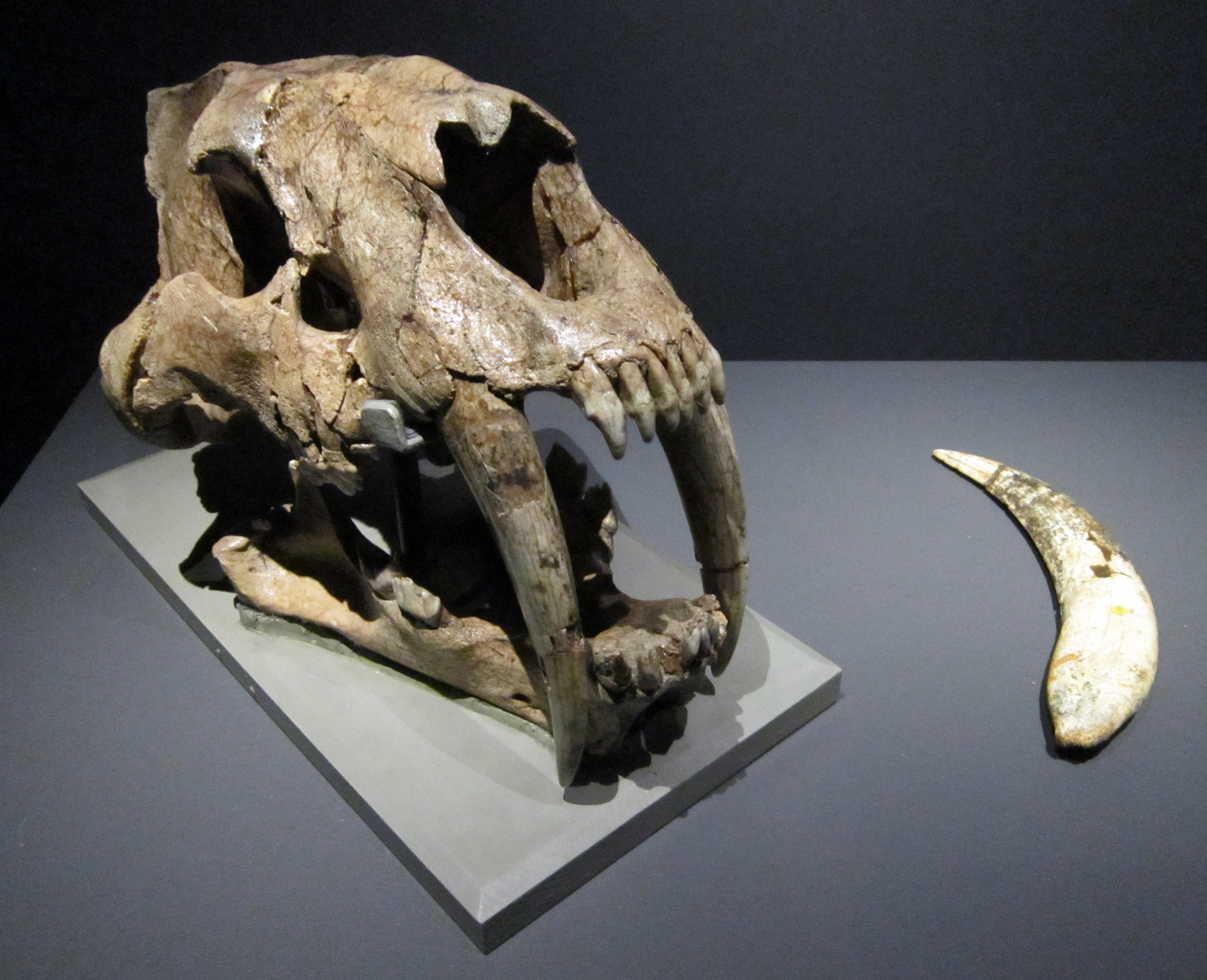
S. populator mandible collected by Lund who described the species (left) and canine tooth from Lund's collection (right) next to a later found skull, Natural History Museum of Denmark

During the 1830s, Danish naturalist Peter Wilhelm Lund and his assistants collected fossils in the calcareous caves near the small town of Lagoa Santa, Minas Gerais, Brazil. Among the thousands of fossils found, he recognized a few isolated cheek teeth as belonging to a hyena, which he named Hyaena neogaea in 1839. After more material was found (including incisor teeth and foot bones), Lund concluded the fossils instead belonged to a distinct genus of felids, though transitional to the hyenas. He stated it would have matched the largest modern predators in size, and was more robust than any modern cat. Lund originally wanted to call the new genus Hyaenodon, but realizing this name had recently been applied to another prehistoric predator, he instead named it Smilodon populator in 1842. He explained the Ancient Greek meaning of Smilodon as σμίλη (smilē), 'scalpel' or 'two-edged knife', and οδόντος (odóntos), 'tooth'. This has also been translated as "tooth shaped like double-edged knife". He explained the species name populator as "the destroyer", which has also been translated as "he who brings devastation". Lund based the name on the shape of the incisors, and the large canine teeth were not known until 1846. By 1846, Lund had acquired nearly every part of the skeleton (from different individuals), and more specimens were found in neighboring countries by other collectors in the following years. Though some later authors used Lund's original species name neogaea instead of populator, it is now considered an invalid nomen nudum, as it was not accompanied with a proper description and no type specimens were designated. Some South American specimens have been referred to other genera, subgenera, species, and subspecies, such as Smilodontidion riggii, Smilodon (Prosmilodon) ensenadensis, and S. bonaeriensis, but these are now thought to be junior synonyms of S. populator.

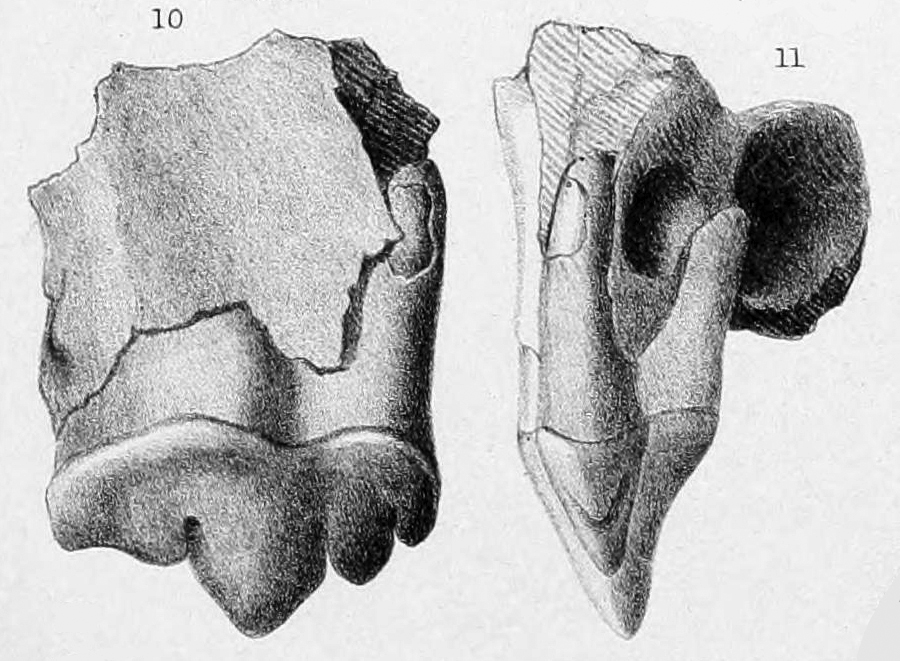
1869 lithograph of the holotype molar and maxilla fragment of S. fatalis

Fossils of Smilodon were discovered in North America from the second half of the 19th century onwards. In 1869, American paleontologist Joseph Leidy described a maxilla fragment with a molar, which had been discovered in a petroleum bed in Hardin County, Texas. He referred the specimen to the genus Felis (which was then used for most cats, extant and extinct), but found it distinct enough to be part of its own subgenus, as F. (Trucifelis) fatalis. The species name means "deadly". In an 1880 article about extinct American cats, American paleontologist Edward Drinker Cope pointed out that the F. fatalis molar was identical to that of Smilodon, and he proposed the new combination S. fatalis. Most North American finds were scanty until excavations began in the La Brea Tar Pits in Los Angeles, where hundreds of individuals of S. fatalis have been found since 1875. S. fatalis has junior synonyms such as S. mercerii, S. floridanus, and S. californicus. American paleontologist Annalisa Berta considered the holotype of S. fatalis too incomplete to be an adequate type specimen, and the species has at times been proposed to be a junior synonym of S. populator. Nordic paleontologists Björn Kurtén and Lars Werdelin supported the distinctness of the two species in an article published in 1990. A 2018 article by the American paleontologist John P. Babiarz and colleagues concluded that S. californicus, represented by the specimens from the La Brea Tar Pits, was a distinct species from S. fatalis after all, and that more research is needed to clarify the taxonomy of the lineage.

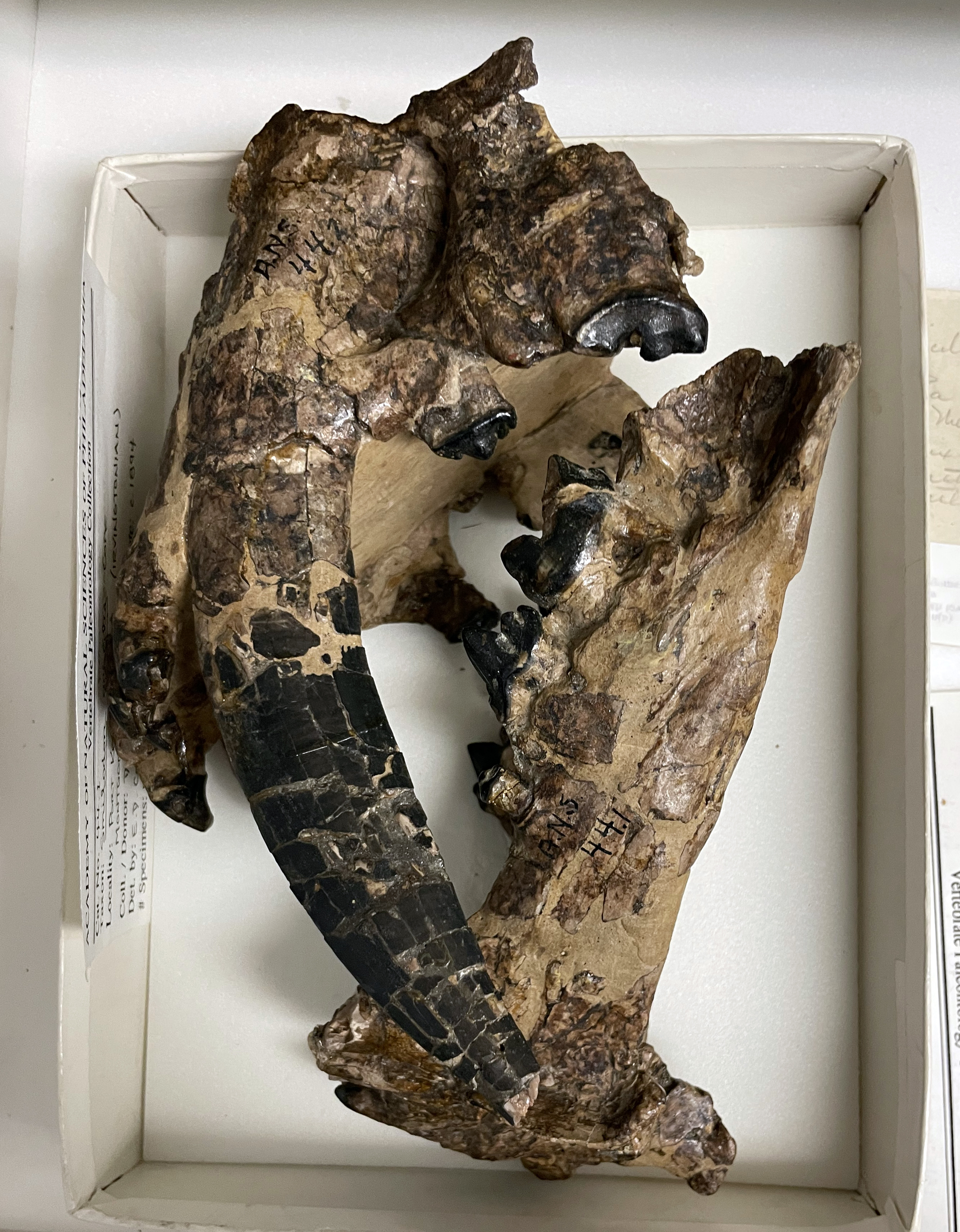
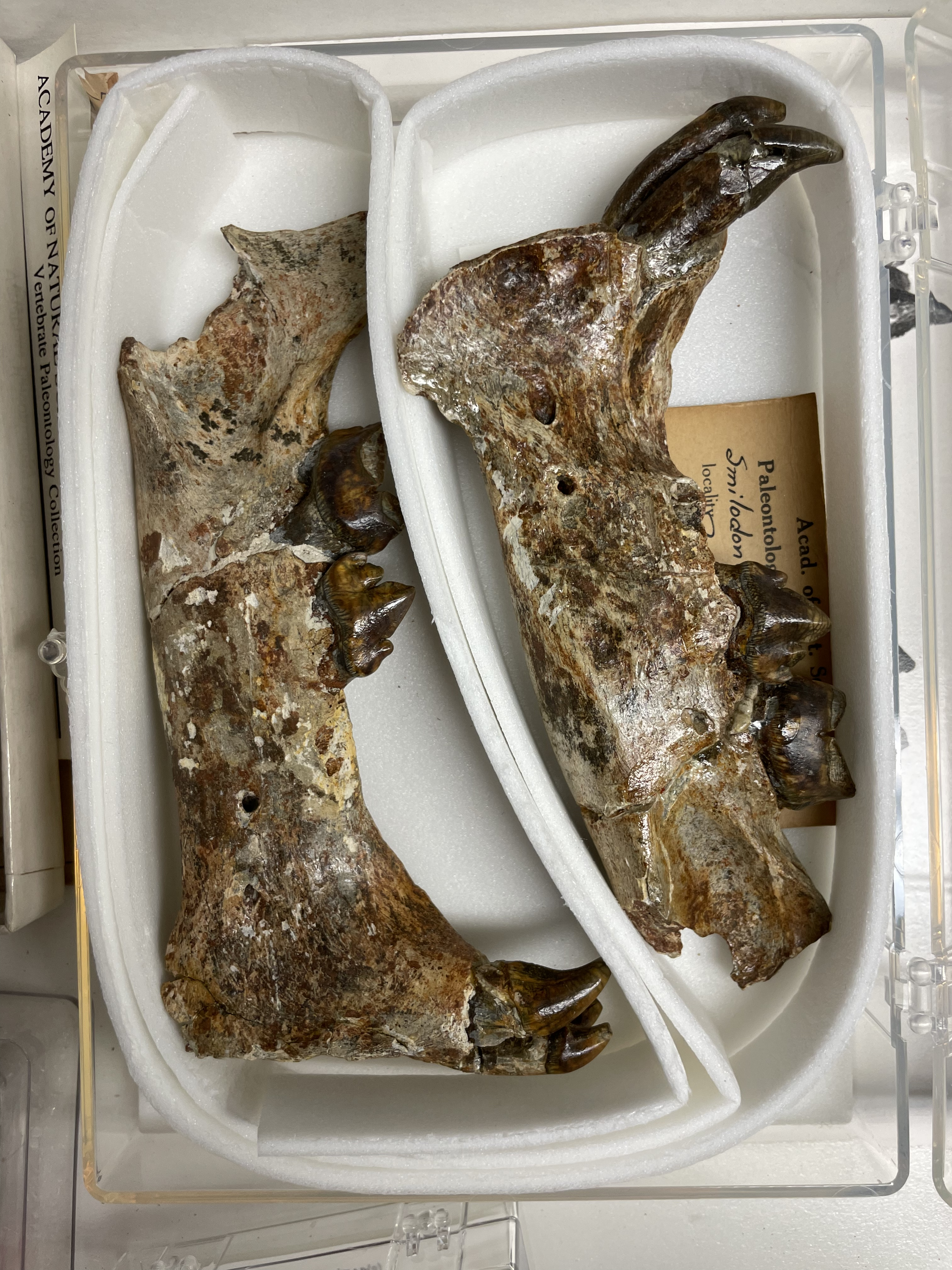
Partial skull and mandibles of S. gracilis, the earliest species in the genus, Academy of Natural Sciences of Philadelphia

In his 1880 article about extinct cats, Cope also named a third species of Smilodon, S. gracilis. The species was based on a partial canine, which had been obtained in the Port Kennedy Cave near the Schuylkill River in Pennsylvania. Cope found the canine to be distinct from that of the other Smilodon species due to its smaller size and more compressed base. Its specific name refers to the species' lighter build. This species is known from fewer and less complete remains than the other members of the genus. S. gracilis has at times been considered part of genera such as Megantereon and Ischyrosmilus. S. populator, S. fatalis and S. gracilis are currently considered the only valid species of Smilodon, and features used to define most of their junior synonyms have been dismissed as variation between individuals of the same species (intraspecific variation). One of the most famous of prehistoric mammals, Smilodon has often been featured in popular media and is the state fossil of California.

=== Evolution ===
Long the most completely known saber-toothed cat, Smilodon is still one of the best-known members of the group, to the point where the two concepts have been confused. The term "saber-tooth" itself refers to an ecomorph consisting of various groups of extinct predatory synapsids (mammals and close relatives), which convergently evolved extremely long maxillary canines, as well as adaptations to the skull and skeleton related to their use. This includes members of Gorgonopsia, Thylacosmilidae, Machaeroidinae, Nimravidae, and Machairodontinae. Within the family Felidae (true cats), members of the subfamily Machairodontinae are referred to as saber-toothed cats, and this group is itself divided into three tribes: Metailurini (false saber-tooths); Homotherini (scimitar-toothed cats); and Smilodontini (dirk-toothed cats), to which Smilodon belongs.

Members of Smilodontini are defined by their long slender canines with fine to no serrations, whereas Homotherini are typified by shorter, broader, and more-flattened canines, with coarser serrations. Members of Metailurini were less specialized and had shorter, less-flattened canines, and are not recognized as members of the Machairodontinae by some researchers.

Despite the colloquial name "saber-toothed tiger", Smilodon is not closely related to the modern tiger (which belongs in the subfamily Pantherinae), or any other extant felid. A 1992 ancient DNA analysis suggested that Smilodon should be grouped with modern cats (subfamilies Felinae and Pantherinae). A 2005 study found that Smilodon belonged to a separate lineage. A study published in 2006 confirmed this, showing that the Machairodontinae diverged early from the ancestors of living cats, and were not closely related to any living species. The ancestors of living cats and Machairodontinae estimated to have diverged around 20 million years ago. The following cladogram based on fossils and DNA analysis shows the placement of Smilodon among extinct and extant felids, after Rincón and colleagues, 2011:

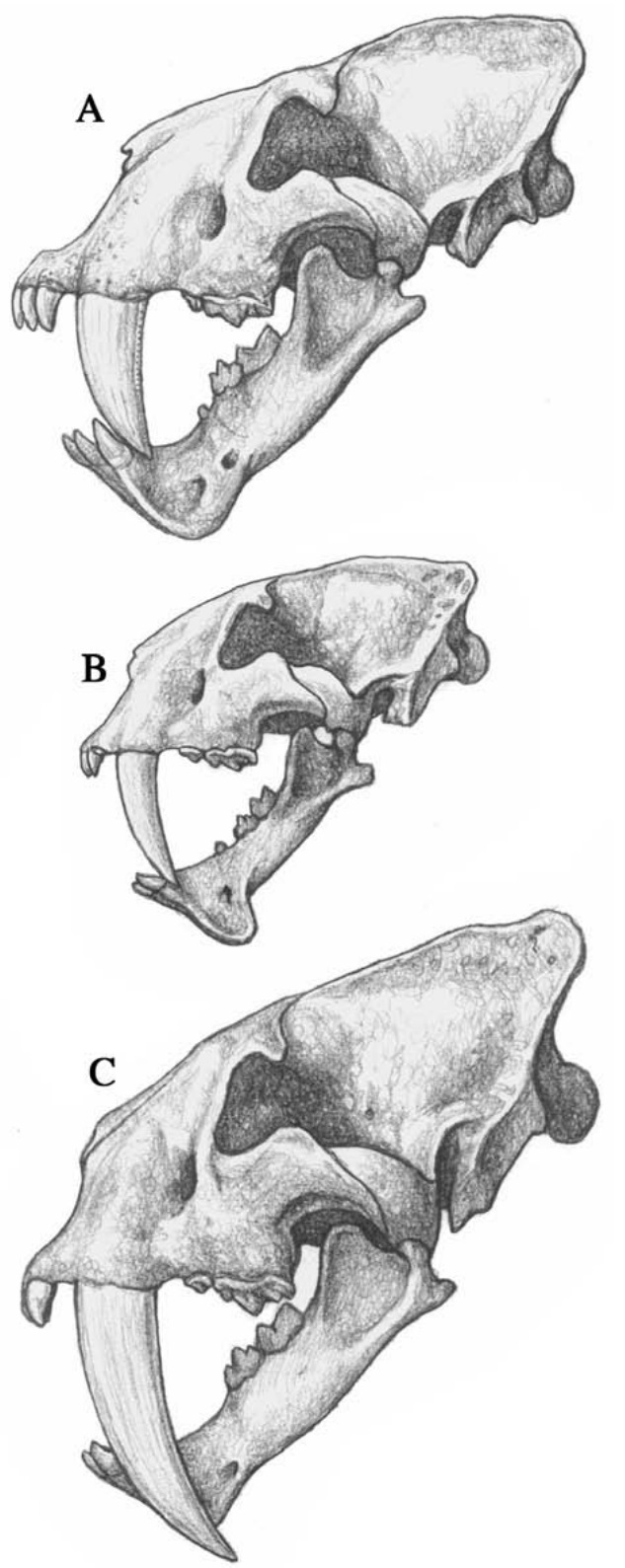
Comparison between the skulls of the machairodonts Homotherium, Megantereon, and Smilodon, by Mauricio Antón

- Felidae
  - Proailurus
  - - Pseudaelurus
    - - - Pantherinae
          Panthera (tigers, lions, jaguars, and leopards)
        - Felinae
          - Caracal
          - - Leopardus (ocelot and relatives)
            - - Felis (domestic cats and relatives)
              - - Herpailurus (jaguarundi)
                - - Miracinonyx
                  - Puma (cougar)
      - Machairodontinae
        - Dinofelis
        - - - Nimravides
            - - Machairodus
              - - Homotherium
                - Xenosmilus
          - - Paramachairodus
            - - Megantereon
              - Smilodon
                - Smilodon gracilis
                - - Smilodon populator
                  - Smilodon fatalis

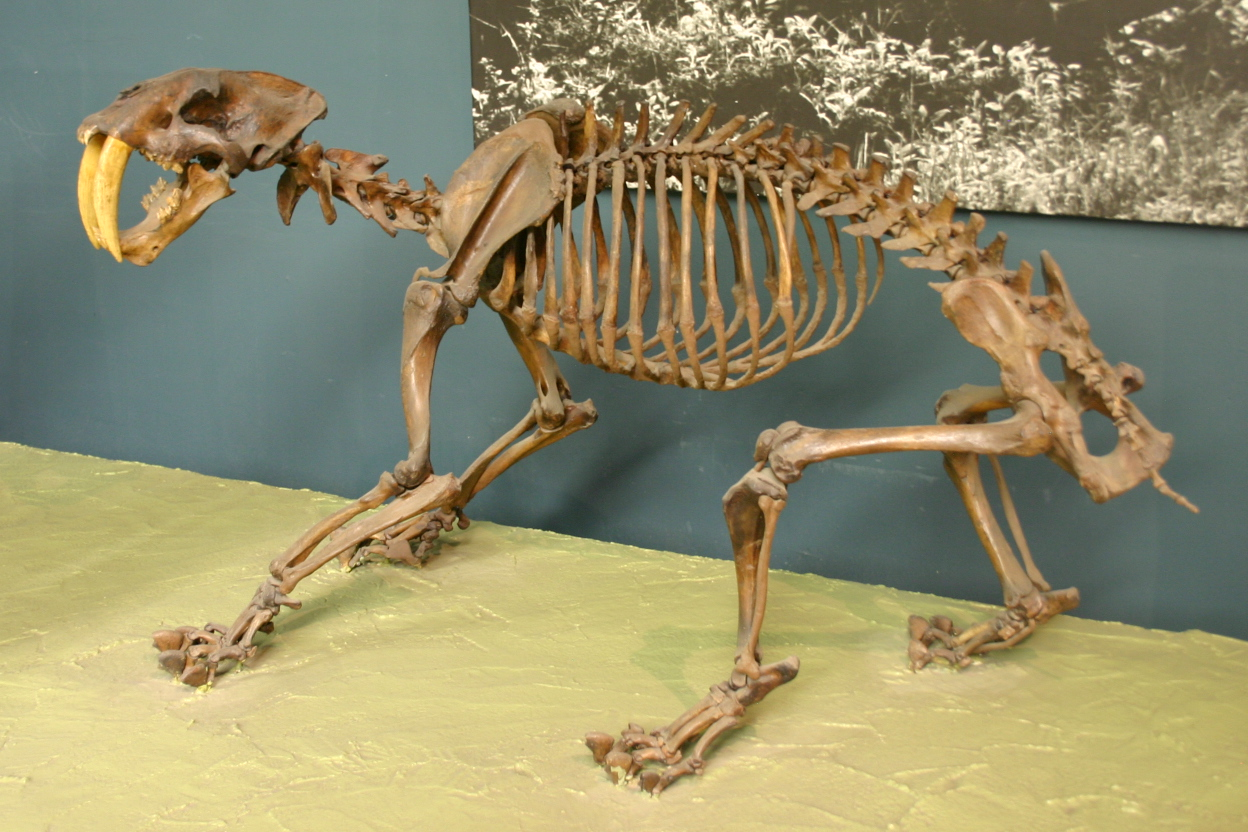
S. fatalis skeleton at the US National Museum of Natural History

The earliest felids are known from the Oligocene of Europe, such as Proailurus, and the earliest one with saber-tooth features is the Miocene genus Pseudaelurus. The skull and mandible morphology of the earliest saber-toothed cats was similar to that of the modern clouded leopards (Neofelis). The lineage further adapted to the precision killing of large animals by developing elongated canine teeth and wider gapes, in the process sacrificing high bite force. As their canines became longer, the bodies of the cats became more robust for immobilizing prey. In derived smilodontins and homotherins, the lumbar region of the spine and the tail became shortened, as did the hind limbs. Machairodonts once represented a dominant group of felids distributed across Africa, Eurasia and the North America during the Miocene and Pliocene epochs, but progressively declined over the course of the Pleistocene, by the Late Pleistocene, only two genera of machairodonts remained, Smilodon, and the distantly related Homotherium, both largely confined to the Americas. Based on mitochondrial DNA sequences extracted from ancient bones, the lineages of Homotherium and Smilodon are estimated to have diverged about 18 million years ago.

The earliest species of Smilodon is S. gracilis, which existed from 2.5 million to 500,000 years ago (early Blancan to Irvingtonian ages) and was the successor in North America of Megantereon, from which it probably evolved. Megantereon itself had entered North America from Eurasia during the Pliocene, along with Homotherium. S. gracilis reached the northern regions of South America in the Early Pleistocene as part of the Great American Interchange. S. fatalis existed 1.6 million–10,000 years ago (late Irvingtonian to Rancholabrean ages), and replaced S. gracilis in North America. S. populator existed 1 million–10,000 years ago (Ensenadan to Lujanian ages); it occurred in the eastern parts of South America.

== Description ==
Size of the three Smilodon species compared to a human

Smilodon was around the size of modern big cats, but was more robustly built. S. gracilis was the smallest species, estimated at 55 to 100 kg (121 to 220 lb) in weight, about the size of a jaguar. It was similar to its predecessor Megantereon of the same size, but its dentition and skull were more advanced, approaching S. fatalis. Late Irvingtonian specimens were larger on average, suggesting that S. gracilis grew in size over time. S. fatalis was intermediate in size between S. gracilis and S. populator. It weighed between 160 and 280 kg (350 and 620 lb), and reached a shoulder height of 100 cm (39 in) and body length of 175 cm (69 in). It was similar to a lion in dimensions, but was more robust and muscular, and therefore had a larger body mass. Its skull was also similar to that of Megantereon, though more massive and with larger canines. S. fatalis size varies based on the climate, with the species reaching larger sizes during warmer periods. In Florida, S. fatalis experienced a size increase from the Illinoian to Wisconsin stage.

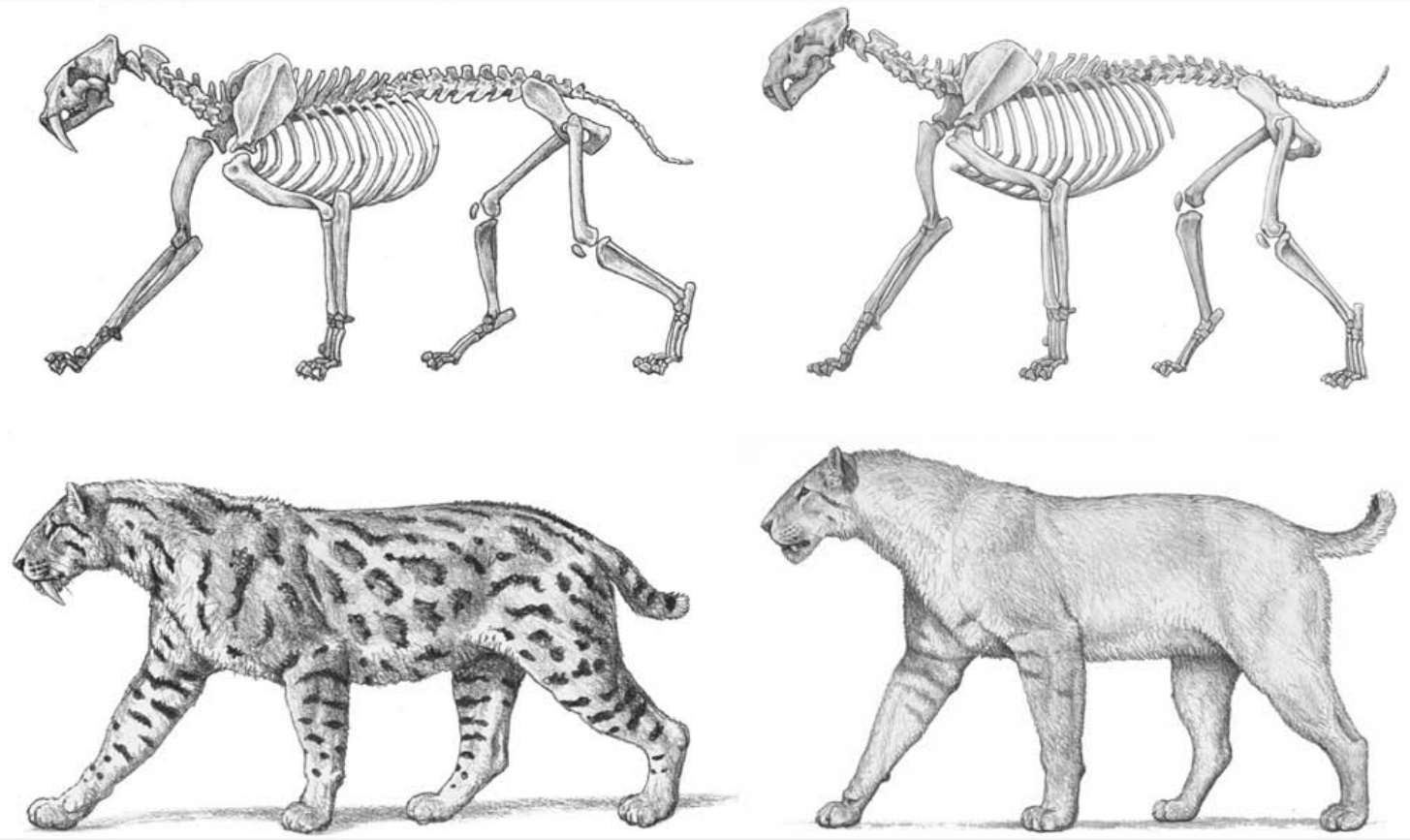
Skeleton and life appearance of Smilodon (left) compared to that of fellow machairodont Homotherium (right), by Antón

S. populator was among the largest known felids, with a shoulder height of 120 cm (47 in) and a typical body mass range from 220 kg (490 lb) to over 400 kg (880 lb), and one estimate suggesting up to 470 kg (1,040 lb). A particularly large S. populator skull from Uruguay measuring 39.2 cm (15.4 in) in length indicates this individual may have weighed as much as 436 kg (961 lb). In contrast, the smallest known histologically adult specimen of S. populator (MCC-868V) weighed 157–171 kg (346–377 lb), possibly due to selective pressure or alternatively due to the specimen representing a new species or subspecies. Compared to S. fatalis, S. populator was more robust and had a more elongated and narrow skull with a straighter upper profile, higher positioned nasal bones, a more vertical occiput, more massive metapodials and slightly longer forelimbs relative to hindlimbs. Large fossil tracks from Argentina (for which the ichnotaxon name Smilodonichium has been proposed) have been attributed to S. populator, and measure 17.6 cm (6.9 in) by 19.2 cm (7.6 in). This is larger than tracks of the Bengal tiger, to which the footprints have been compared.

=== Skeleton ===
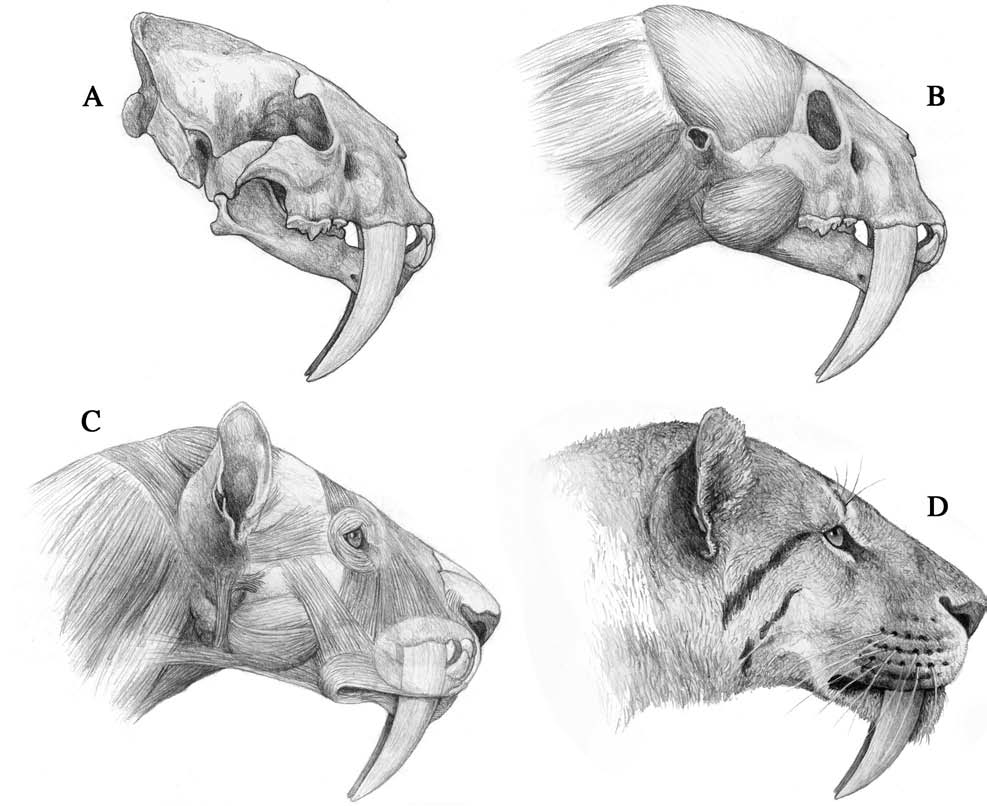
Step by step reconstructions of the head's anatomy by Antón

Smilodon is most famous for its relatively long canine teeth, which are the longest found in the saber-toothed cats, at about 28 cm (11 in) long in the largest species, S. populator. The canines were slender and had fine serrations on the front and back side. The skull was robustly proportioned and the muzzle was short and broad. The cheek bones (zygomata) were deep and widely arched, the sagittal crest was prominent, and the frontal region was slightly convex. The mandible had a flange on each side of the front. The upper incisors were large, sharp, and slanted forwards. There was a diastema (gap) between the incisors and molars of the mandible. The lower incisors were broad, recurved, and placed in a straight line across. The p3 premolar tooth of the mandible was present in most early specimens, but lost in later specimens; it was only present in 6% of the La Brea sample.

Smilodon had a reduced lumbar region, high scapula, short tail, and broad limbs with relatively short feet. There is some dispute over whether Smilodon was sexually dimorphic. Some studies of S. fatalis fossils have found little difference between the sexes. Conversely, a 2012 study found that, while fossils of S. fatalis show less variation in size among individuals than modern Panthera, they do appear to show the same difference between the sexes in some traits. Despite the large number of remains found, including ear ossicles, and the fact that all modern felids appear to have one, no baculum, or penis bone, has yet been found for Smilodon (the same applies to other machairodontins). This has raised the question of whether Smilodon really lacked a baculum and whether this absence of evidence can be considered legitimate evidence of absence.

=== External features ===
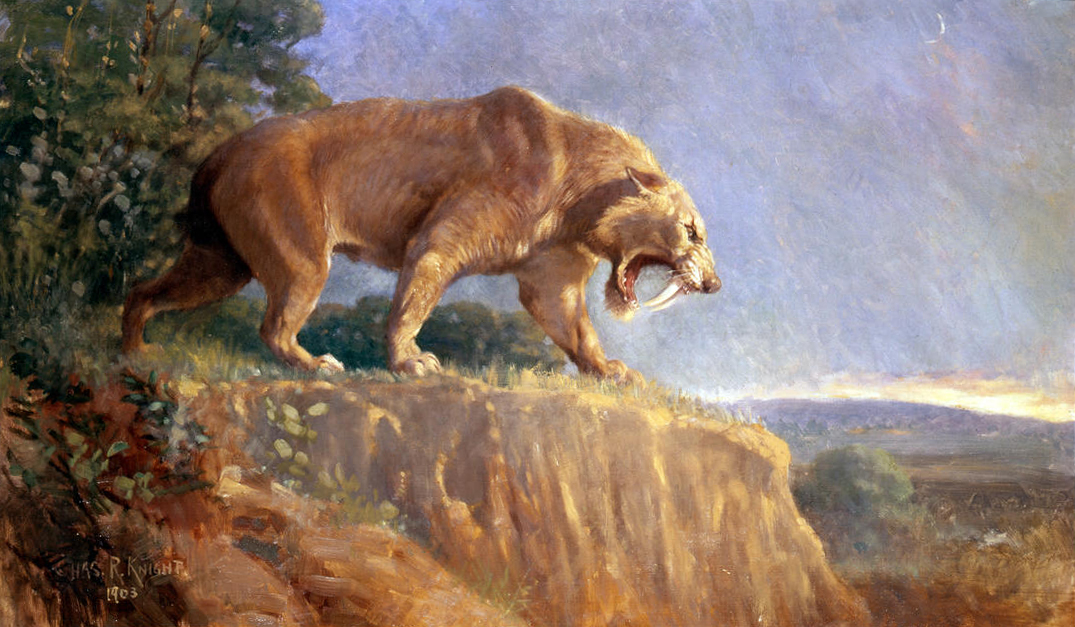
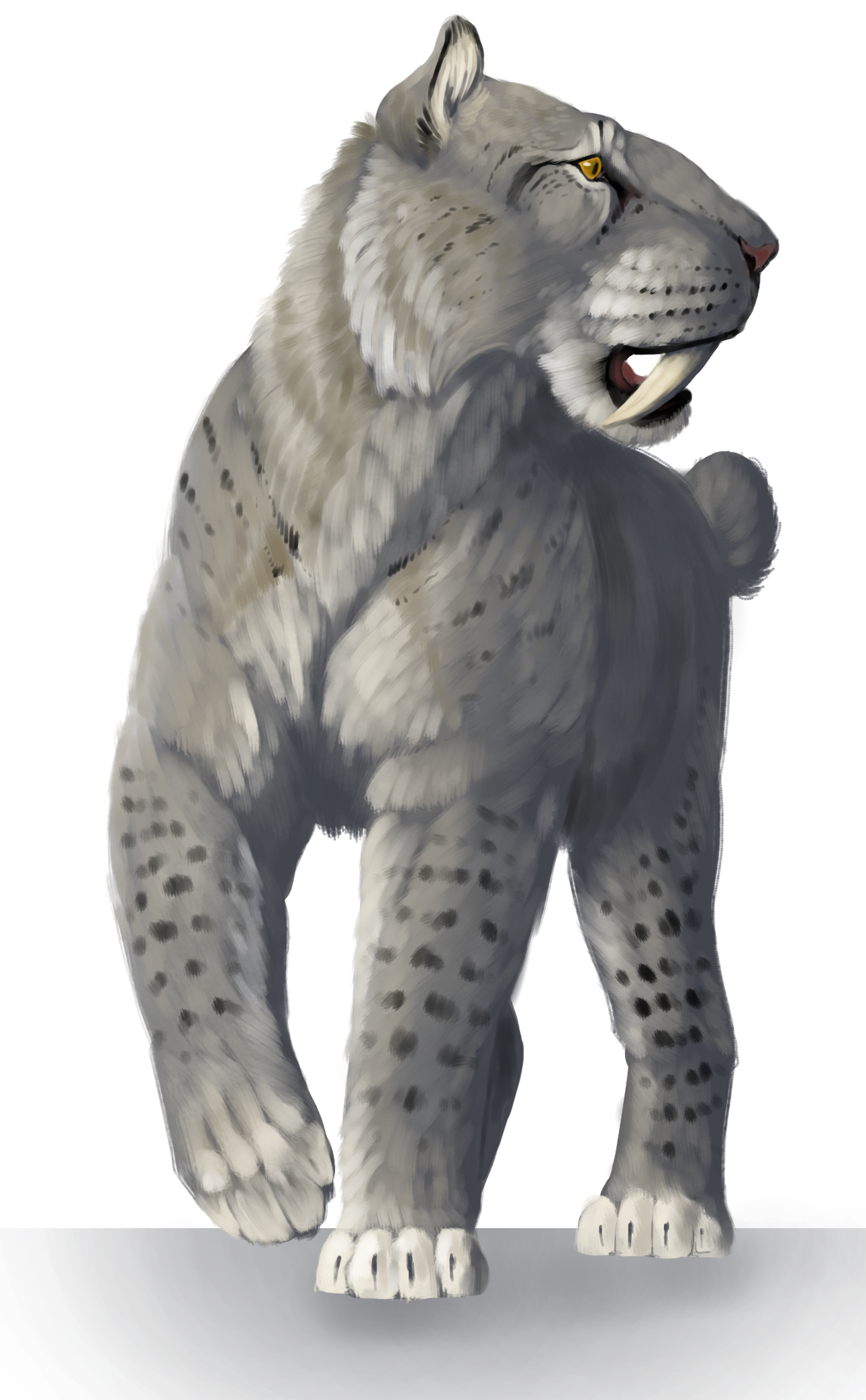
S. populator restored with plain coat by Charles R. Knight in 1903 (left), and S. fatalis restored with spotted coat, both of which are considered possibilities

Smilodon and other saber-toothed cats have been reconstructed with both plain-colored coats and with spotted patterns (which appears to be the ancestral condition for feliforms), both of which are considered possible. Studies of modern cat species have found that species that live in the open tend to have uniform coats while those that live in more vegetated habitats have more markings, with some exceptions. Some coat features, such as the manes of male lions or the stripes of the tiger, are too unusual to predict from fossils.

Traditionally, saber-toothed cats have been artistically restored with external features similar to those of extant felids, by artists such as Charles R. Knight in collaboration with various paleontologists in the early 20th century. In 1969, paleontologist G. J. Miller instead proposed that Smilodon would have looked very different from a typical cat and similar to a bulldog, with a lower lip line (to allow its mouth to open wide without tearing the facial tissues), a more retracted nose and lower-placed ears. Paleoartist Mauricio Antón and coauthors disputed this in 1998 and maintained that the facial features of Smilodon were overall not very different from those of other cats. Antón noted that modern large felids have folded, elastic lips which help them open their mouths without tearing tissue and this could have existed in Smilodon. Antón stated that extant phylogenetic bracketing (where the features of the closest extant relatives of a fossil taxon are used as reference) is the most reliable way of restoring the life-appearance of prehistoric animals, and the cat-like Smilodon restorations by Knight are therefore still accurate. A 2022 study by Antón and colleagues concluded that the upper canines of Smilodon would have been visible when the mouth was closed, while those of Homotherium would have not, after examining fossils and extant big cats.

== Paleobiology ==
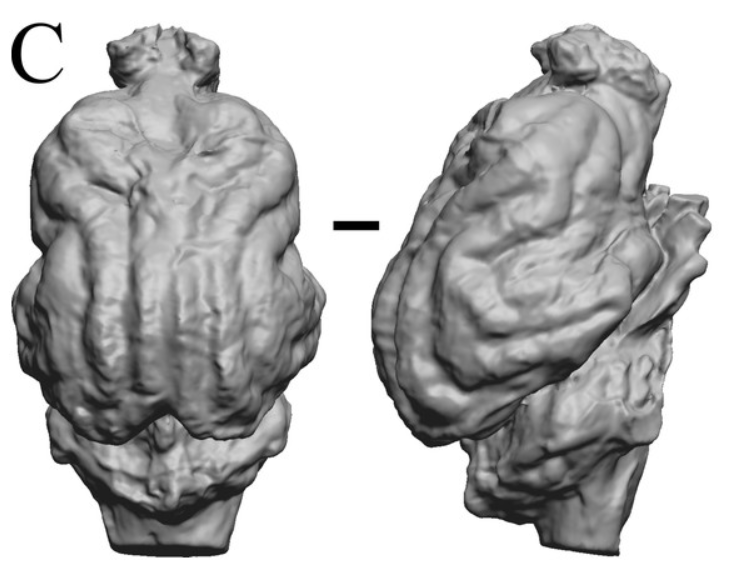
Digital endocast of the cranial cavity of S. fatalis (LACMHC 2001-199).

Phylogenetic analysis recovered Smilodon as a diurnal predator. S. fatalis had proportionally larger hyoid bones than modern felid species and thus likely produced deeper vocalizations. While Smilodon had the same number of hyoid bones as the roaring cats, their shape was closer to that of purring species.

The brain of Smilodon had sulcal patterns similar to modern cats, which suggests an increased complexity of the regions that control the sense of hearing, sight, and coordination of the limbs. Felid saber-tooths in general had relatively small eyes that were not as forward-facing as those of modern cats, which have good binocular vision to help them move in trees. By finding of correlation between relative cribriform plate size and repertoire of functional olfactory receptor genes, it was found that S. fatalis had a slightly smaller repertoire than modern felids with 600 olfatory receptor genes, compared to 677 of a domestic cat. This indicates that S. fatalis used less olfaction for its daily activities than modern felids.

=== Limb movements ===
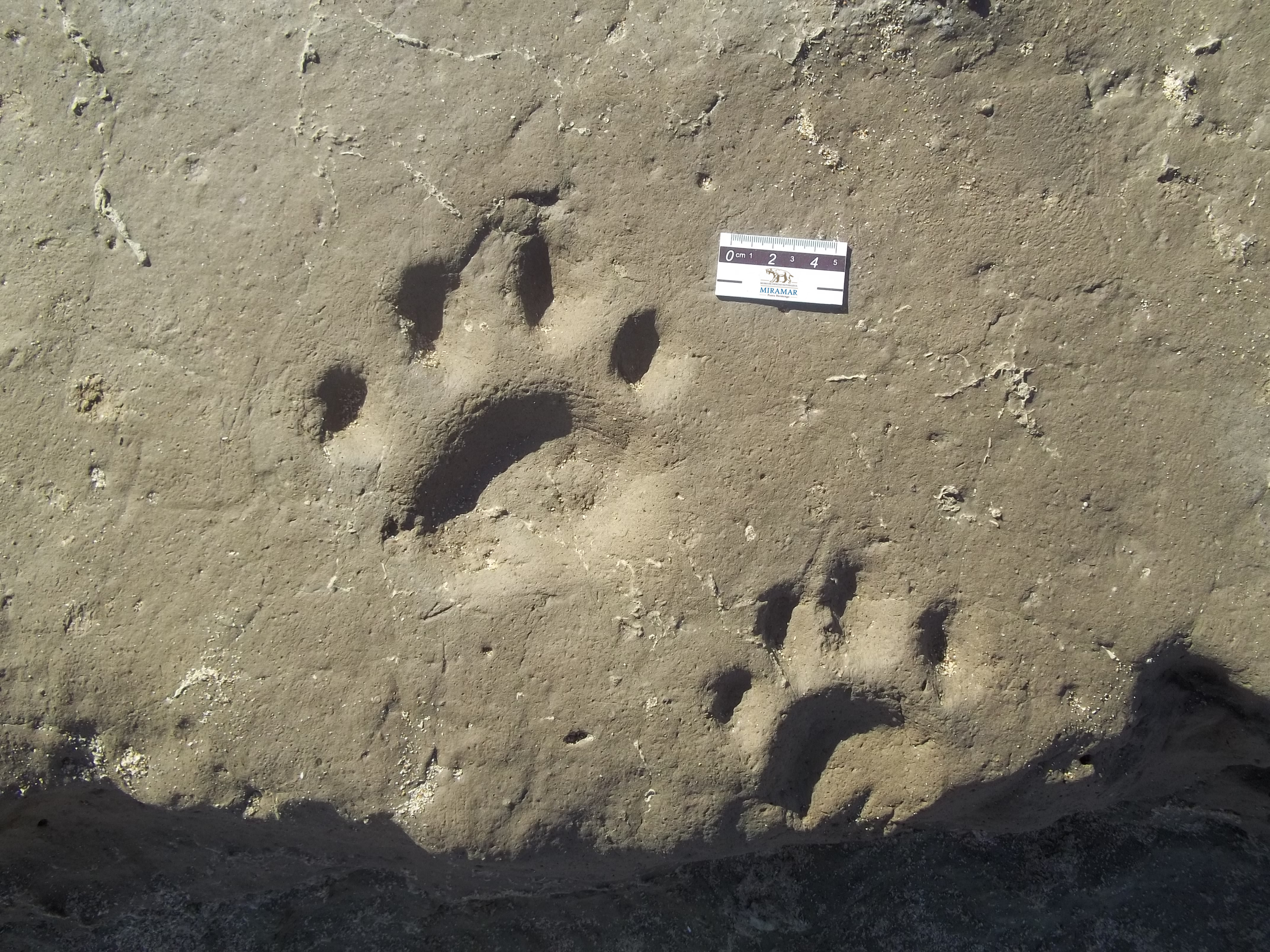
Tracks from Argentina which may have been produced by Smilodon

Smilodon was likely an ambush predator that concealed itself in dense vegetation, as its limb proportions were similar to modern forest-dwelling cats, and its short tail would not have helped it balance while running. Tracks from Argentina named Felipeda miramarensis in 2019 may have been produced by Smilodon. If correctly identified, the tracks indicate that the animal had fully retractible claws, plantigrade feet, lacked strong supination capabilities in its paws, notably robust forelimbs compared to the hindlimbs, and was probably an ambush predator. Unlike its ancestor Megantereon, which was at least partially scansorial and therefore able to climb trees, Smilodon was probably completely terrestrial due to its greater weight and lack of climbing adaptations. The heel bone of Smilodon was fairly long, which suggests it was a good jumper.

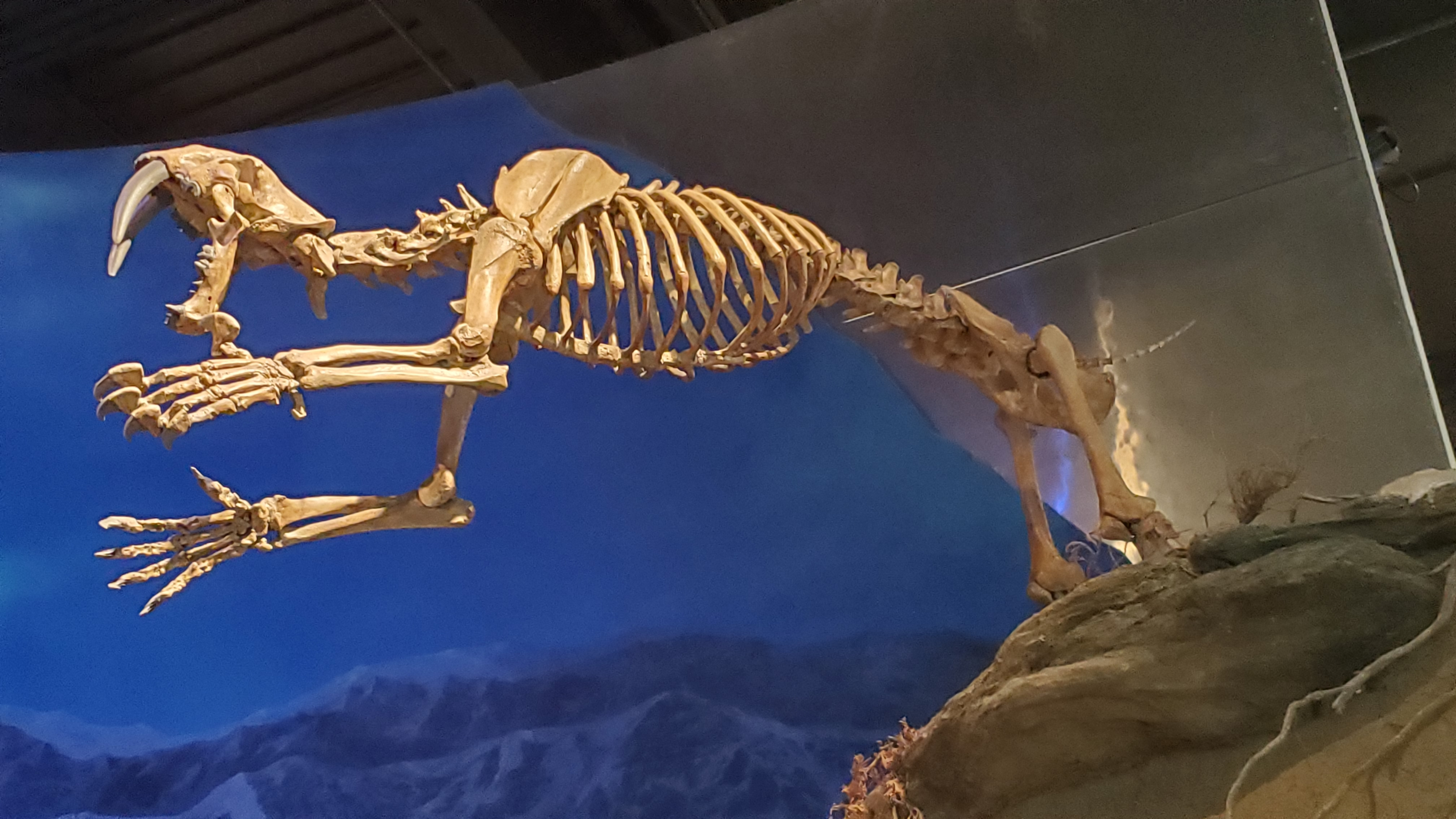
S. fatalis skeleton mounted in leaping posture, Royal Tyrrell Museum

Its well-developed flexor and extensor muscles in its forearms probably enabled it to pull down, and securely hold down, large prey. Analysis of the cross-sections of S. fatalis humeri indicated that they were strengthened by cortical thickening to such an extent that they would have been able to sustain greater loading than those of extant big cats, or of the extinct American lion. The humerus cortical wall in S. fatalis was a 15 % thicker than expected in modern big cats of similar size. The thickening of S. fatalis femurs was within the range of extant felids.

=== Diet ===
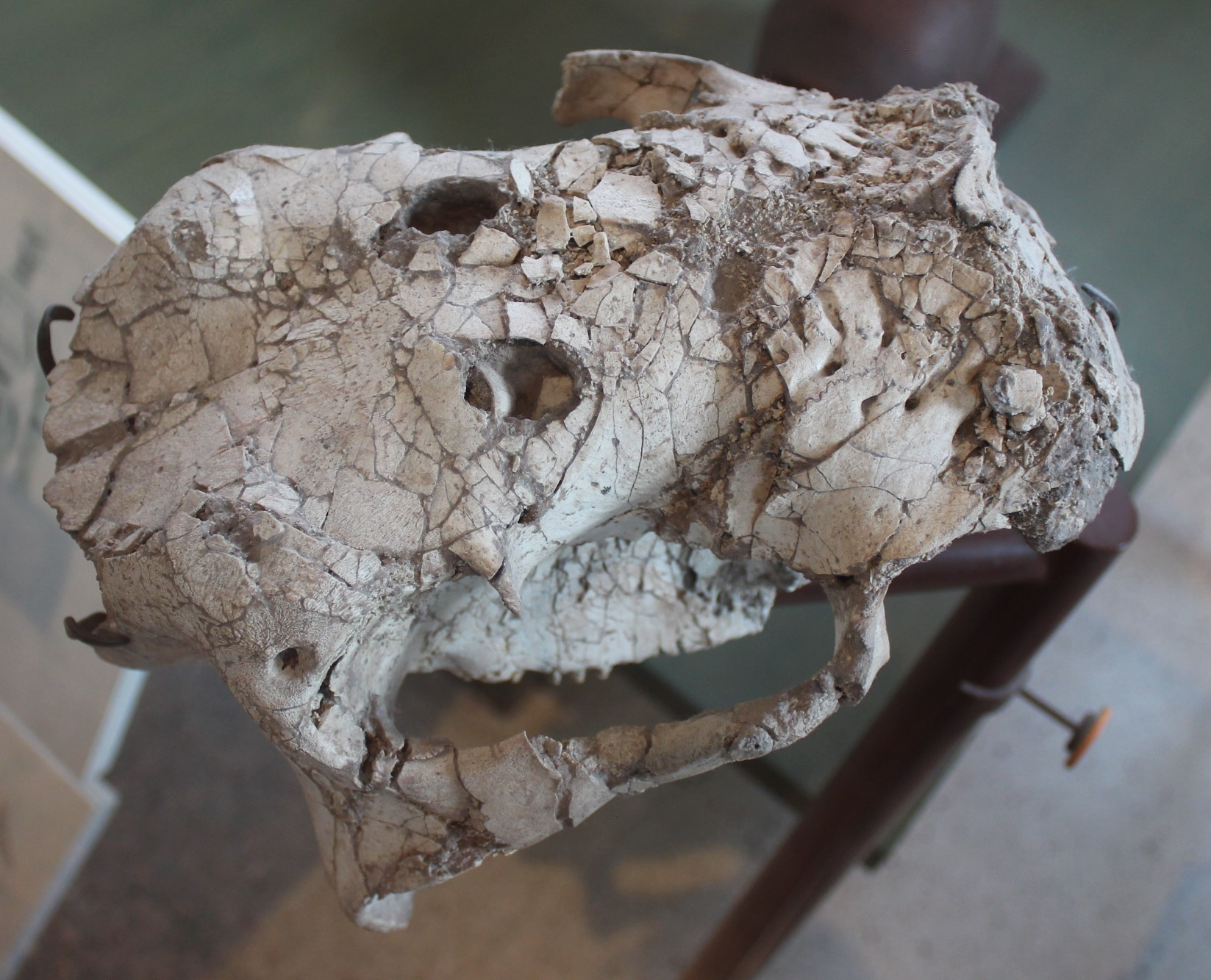
Glyptotherium skull with probable S. fatalis bite marks, American Museum of Natural History

An apex predator, Smilodon primarily hunted large mammals. Isotopes preserved in the bones of S. fatalis in the La Brea Tar Pits reveal that ruminants like bison (Bison antiquus, which was much larger than the modern American bison) and camels (Camelops) were most commonly taken by the cats there. S. fatalis may have also occasionally preyed upon Glyptotherium, based on a skull from a juvenile G. texanum recovered from Pleistocene deposits in Arizona that bear the distinctive elliptical puncture marks best matching those of Smilodon, indicating that the predator successfully bit into the skull through the glyptodont's armored cephalic shield.

Isotopes preserved in the tooth enamel of S. gracilis specimens from Florida show that this species fed on the peccary Platygonus and the llama-like Hemiauchenia. Stable carbon isotope measurements of S. gracilis remains in Florida varied significantly between different sites and show that the species was flexible in its feeding habits. During the glacials, S. gracilis has overlapping values with Edward’s wolf (Canis edwardii), suggesting greater levels of competition for grazing herbivores. In contrast, during interglacials S. gracilis preyed upon browsers and niche partitioned with Canis edwardii, who still preferred grazing prey. Dental microwear shows a trend of S. gracilis consuming harder, tougher foods during glacials as compared to interglacials. This finding suggests that S. gracilis preyed more heavily on larger mixed feeders with tougher hides during glacials, in contrast to interglacials, in which S. gracilis preferred soft-skinned browsers. Isotopic studies of dire wolf (Aenocyon dirus) and American lion (Panthera atrox) bones show an overlap with S. fatalis in prey in Rancho La Brea, which suggests that they were competitors. More detailed isotope analysis at Rancho La Brea however, indicated that Smilodon fatalis preferred forest-dwelling prey such as tapirs, deer and forest-dwelling bison as opposed to the dire wolves' preferences for prey inhabiting open areas such as grassland. The availability of prey in the Rancho La Brea area was likely comparable to modern East Africa.

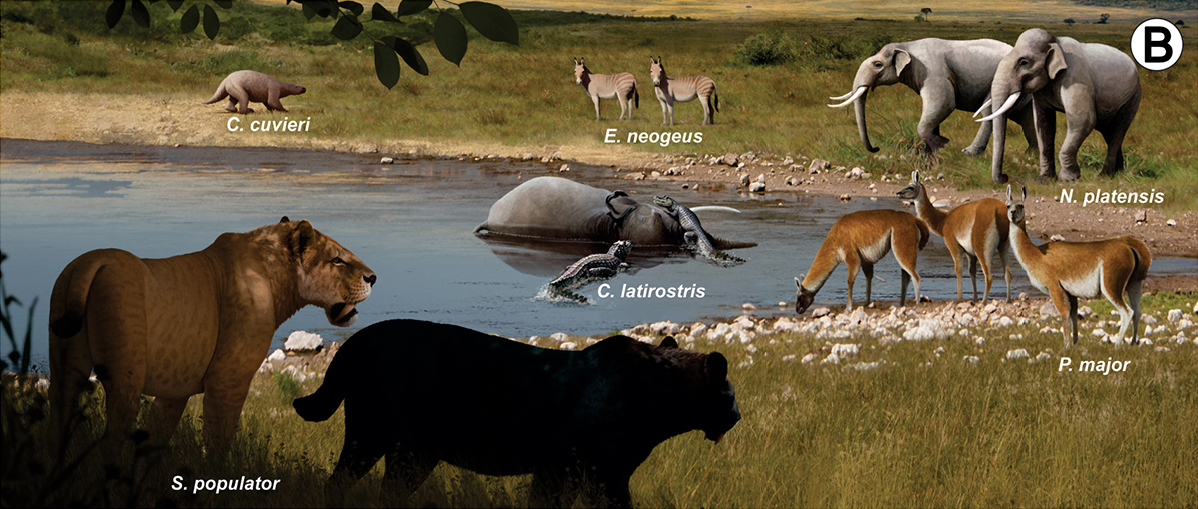
Two S. populator stalking a Palaeolama major group in Brazil, in a landscape also including the gomphothere Notiomastodon platensis, the horse Equus neogeus and the ground sloth Catonyx cuvieri

As Smilodon migrated to South America, its diet changed; bison were absent, the horses and proboscideans were different, and native ungulates such as toxodonts and litopterns were completely unfamiliar, yet S. populator thrived as well there as its relatives in North America. Regressions suggests that a 436 kg (961 lb) S. populator is capable of taking on prey up to 3 t (3.0 long tons; 3.3 short tons) with a pack of S. populator potentially being capable of taking down fully grown megaherbivores such as Megatherium and Notiomastodon.

Isotopic analysis of the Pampean region suggests S. populator hunted in open C3/C4 areas and its main prey included ground sloths such as Lestodon and Megatherium, the equine Hippidion, and the camel-like litoptern ungulate Macrauchenia. Within the Poço Redondo, Sergipe state of the Brazilian Intertropical Region, the main prey of S. populator consisted of rhinoceros-like ungulate Toxodon platensis, the large armadillo relatives Pachyarmatherium, Holmesina, species of the glyptodont genus Panochthus, the llama Palaeolama, the ground sloth Catonyx, and the equine Equus neogeus, and the crocodilian Caiman latirostris. This analysis of its diet also indicates that S. populator hunted both in open and forested habitats within the Brazilian Intertropical Region. However, a more detailed analysis found the main prey of S. populator within the Brazilian Intertropical Region mainly predated upon Nothrotherium maquinense.

The differences between the North and South American species may be due to the difference in prey between the two continents. Smilodon may have avoided eating bone and would have left enough food for scavengers. Coprolites assigned to S. populator recovered from Argentina preserve osteoderms from the ground sloth Mylodon and a Lama scaphoid bone. In addition to this unambiguous evidence of bone consumption, the coprolites suggest that Smilodon had a more generalist diet than previously thought. Examinations of dental microwear from La Brea further suggests that Smilodon consumed both flesh and bone. Smilodon itself may have scavenged dire wolf kills. It has been suggested that Smilodon was a pure scavenger that used its canines for display to assert dominance over carcasses, but this theory is not supported today as no modern terrestrial mammals are pure scavengers.

=== Bite mechanics ===
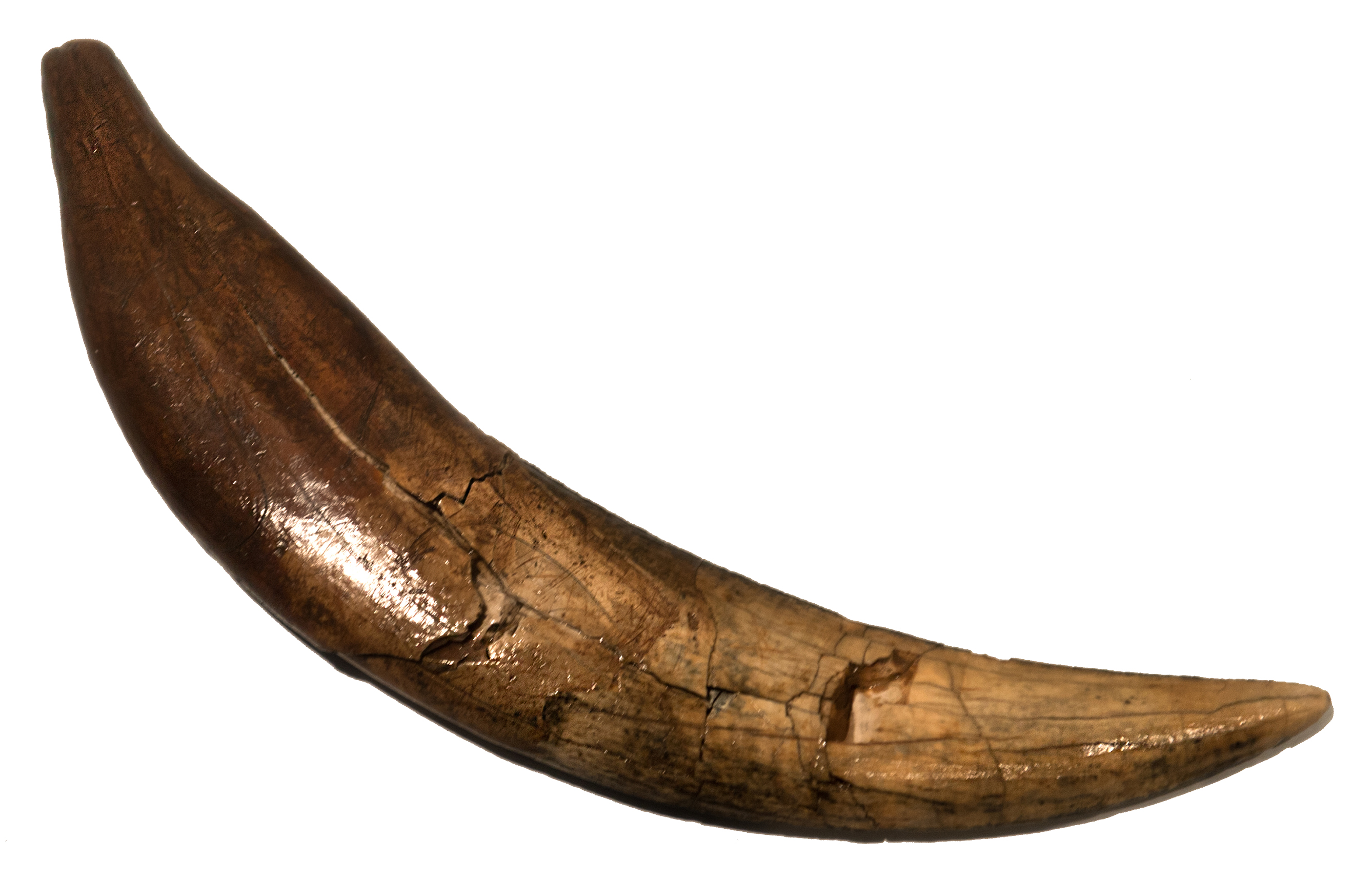
S. populator canine tooth; the tip points to the right

The canines of Smilodon were more fragile by the sides due to their flattened shape; due to the risk of breaking, these cats had to subdue and restrain their prey with their powerful forelimbs before they could use their canine teeth, and likely used quick slashing or stabbing bites rather than the slow, suffocating bites typically used by modern cats. As evidenced by fossils, Smilodon was capable of biting through bone with its canines; various bones from Toxodon platensis, Lestodon armatus, Glossotherium robustum, Doedicurus clavicaudatus and Notiomastodon platensis, found at the Salto de Piedra site in Argentina, show that the upper canines of Smilodon populator were capable of penetrating the cortical bone wall of relatively large and robust animals. The bending force applied from the back to front of a S. fatalis upper canine required to break it, has been estimated to be of 7000 Newtons, in comparison, in lions and tigers, two predators of similar size, a bending force of 8243 and 7440 Newtons, respectively, would be required. Additionally, a comparative finite element analysis between S. fatalis and Barbourofelis fricki found the skull of the former to be much less well suited for withstanding the stresses associated with biting relative to that of the latter.

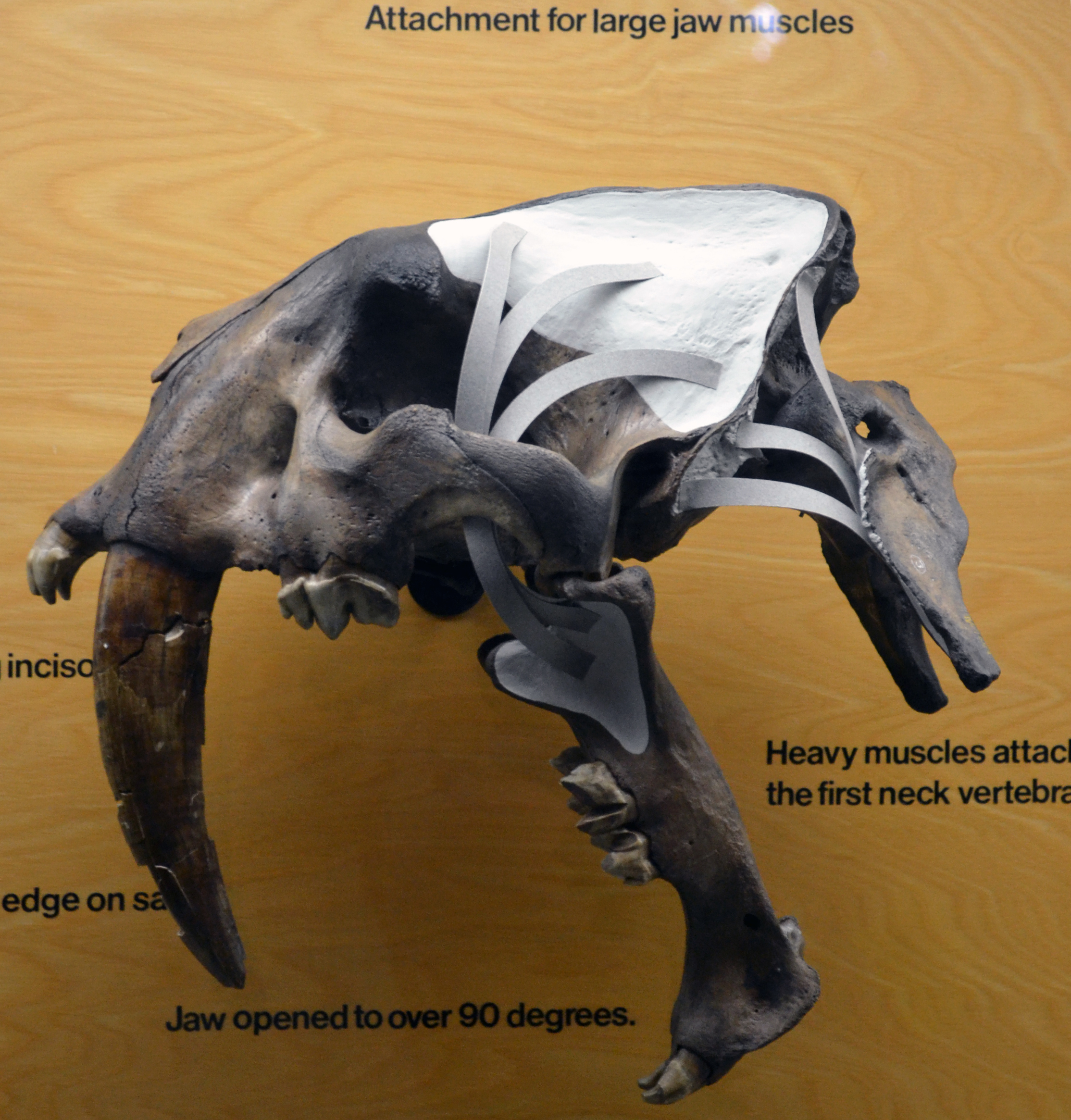
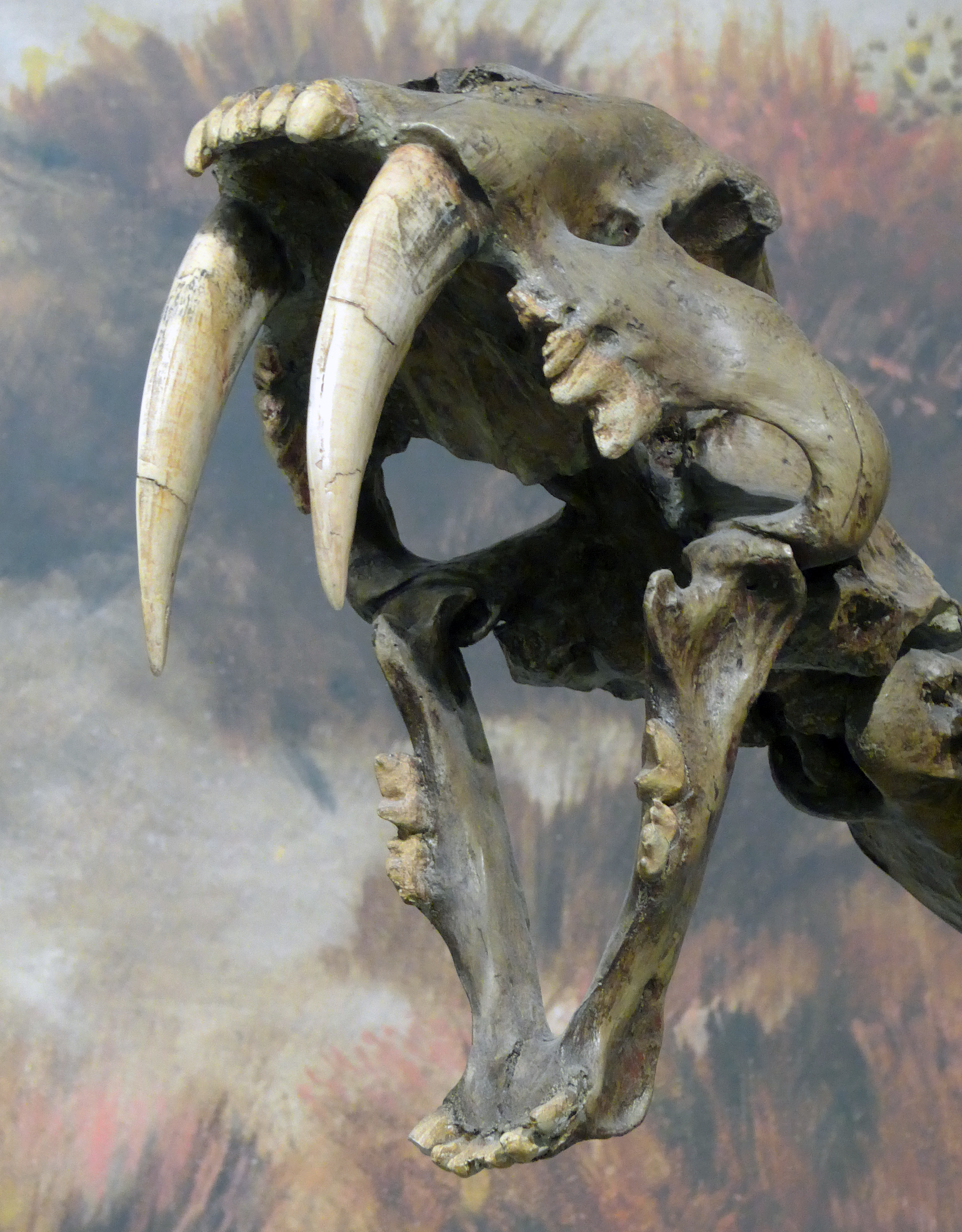
S. fatalis skull with muscle reconstruction showing maximum gape (left) and skull in oblique view

Debate continues as to how Smilodon killed its prey. Traditionally, the most popular theory is that the cat delivered a deep stabbing bite or open-jawed stabbing thrust to the throat, killing the prey very quickly. Another hypothesis suggests that Smilodon targeted the belly of its prey. This is disputed, as the curvature of their prey's belly would likely have prevented the cat from getting a good bite or stab. In regard to how Smilodon delivered its bite, the "canine shear-bite" hypothesis has been favored, where flexion of the neck and rotation of the skull assisted in biting the prey, but this may be mechanically impossible. However, evidence from comparisons with Homotherium suggest that Smilodon was fully capable of and utilized the canine shear-bite as its primary means of killing prey, based on the fact that it had a thick skull and relatively little trabecular bone, while Homotherium had both more trabecular bone and a more lion-like clamping bite as its primary means of attacking prey. The discovery, made by Figueirido and Lautenschlager et al., published in 2018 suggests extremely different ecological adaptations in both machairodonts. The mandibular flanges may have helped resist bending forces when the mandible was pulled against the hide of a prey animal. It has been experimentally proven by means of a machine that recreates the teeth, and simulates the movements of jaws and neck of Smilodon fatalis (The "Robocat") on bison and elk carcasses, that the stabbing bite to the throat is a much more plausible and practical killing technique than the stabbing bite to the belly.

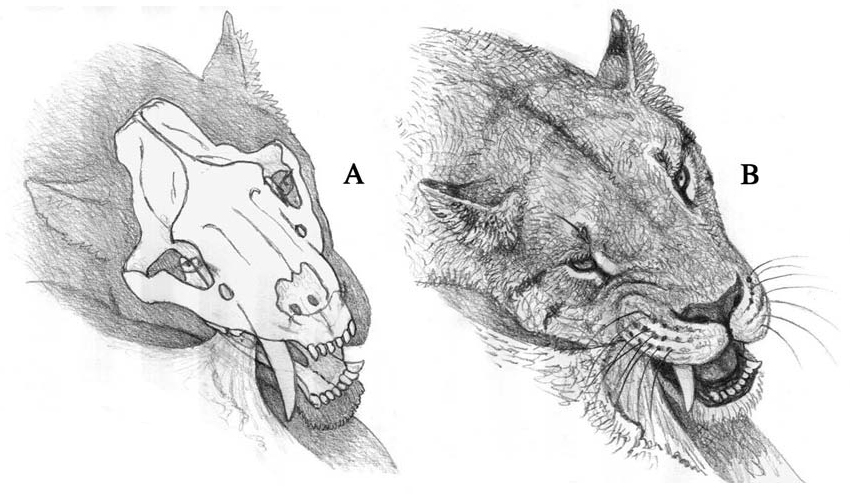
Restoration of Smilodon applying a carnassial bite while feeding, by Antón

The protruding incisors were arranged in an arch, and were used to hold the prey still and stabilize it while the canine bite was delivered. The contact surface between the canine crown and the gum was enlarged, which helped stabilize the tooth and helped the cat sense when the tooth had penetrated to its maximum extent. Since saber-toothed cats generally had a relatively large infraorbital foramen (opening) in the skull, which housed nerves associated with the whiskers, it has been suggested the improved senses would have helped the cats' precision when biting outside their field of vision, and thereby prevent breakage of the canines. The blade-like carnassial teeth were used to cut skin to access the meat, and the reduced molars suggest that they were less adapted for crushing bones than modern cats. As the food of modern cats enters the mouth through the side while cutting with the carnassials, not the front incisors between the canines, the animals do not need to gape widely, so the canines of Smilodon would likewise not have been a hindrance when feeding. A study published in 2022 of how machairodonts fed revealed that wear patterns on the teeth of S. fatalis also suggest that it was capable of eating bone to a similar extent as lions. This and comparisons with bite marks left by the contemporary machairodont Xenosmilus suggest that Smilodon and its relatives could efficiently de-flesh a carcass of meat when feeding without being hindered by their long canines.

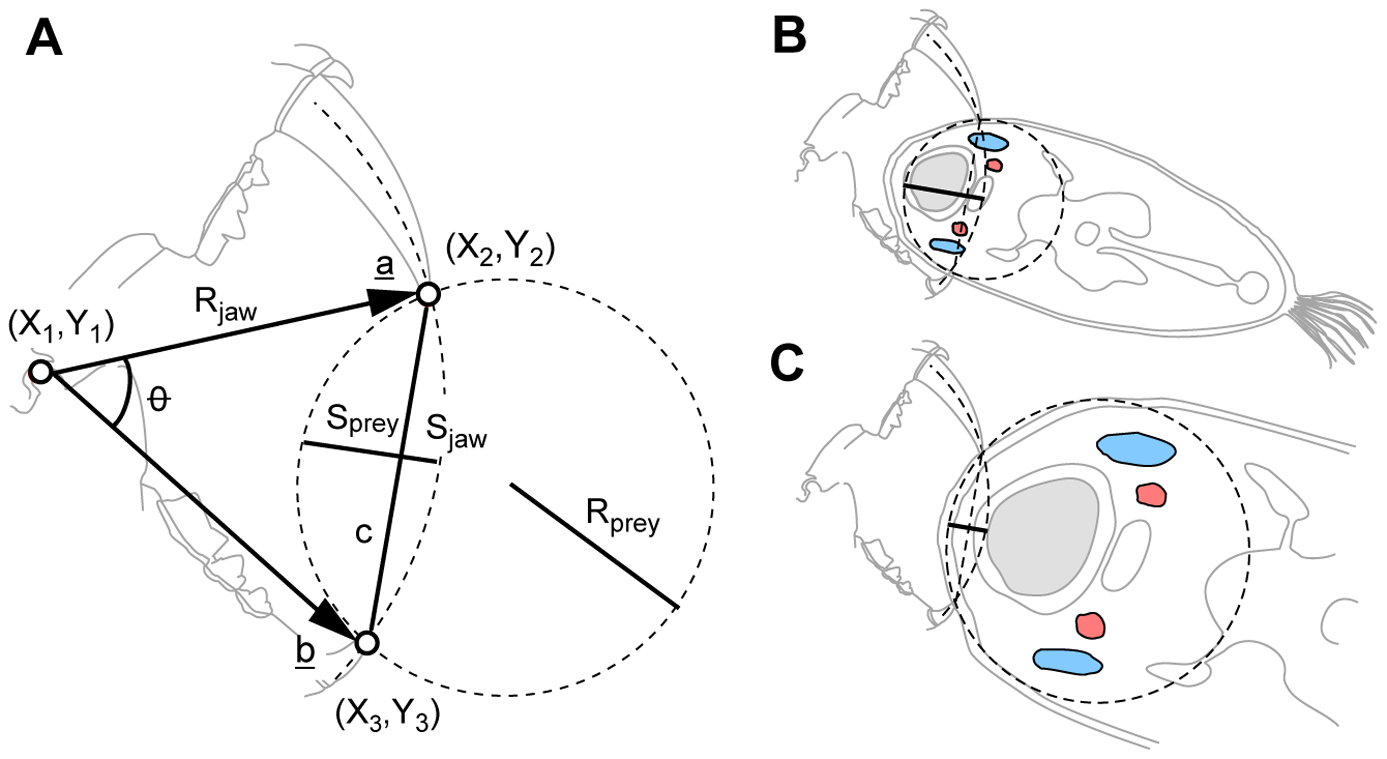
Maximum gape of a saber-toothed cat (A) and reconstructions of neck bite in prey of different sizes (B, C)

Despite being more powerfully built than other large cats, Smilodon had a weaker bite. Modern big cats have more pronounced zygomatic arches, while these were smaller in Smilodon, which restricted the thickness and therefore power of the temporalis muscles and thus reduced Smilodon's bite force. Analysis of its narrow jaws indicates that it could produce a bite only a third as strong as that of a lion (the bite force quotient measured for the lion is 112). The bite force of S. fatalis has been estimated as 1283.74 N at the canine and 4671.41 N at the carnassial, forces comparable to the bite force of the much smaller jaguar. There seems to be a general rule that the saber-toothed cats with the largest canines had proportionally weaker bites. Analyses of canine bending strength (the ability of the canine teeth to resist bending forces without breaking) and bite forces indicate that the saber-toothed cats' teeth were stronger relative to the bite force than those of modern big cats. In addition, Smilodon's gape could have reached over 110°, while that of the modern lion reaches 65°. This made the gape wide enough to allow Smilodon to grasp large prey despite the long canines. A 2018 study compared the killing behavior of Smilodon fatalis and Homotherium serum, and found that the former had a strong skull with little trabecular bone for a stabbing canine-shear bite, whereas the latter had more trabecular bone and used a clamp and hold style more similar to lions. The two would therefore have held distinct ecological niches. The supplementary materials of a 2020 study suggested S. gracilis and S. populator had a jaw gape of 89.13° and 82.05° respectively.

=== Social behavior ===
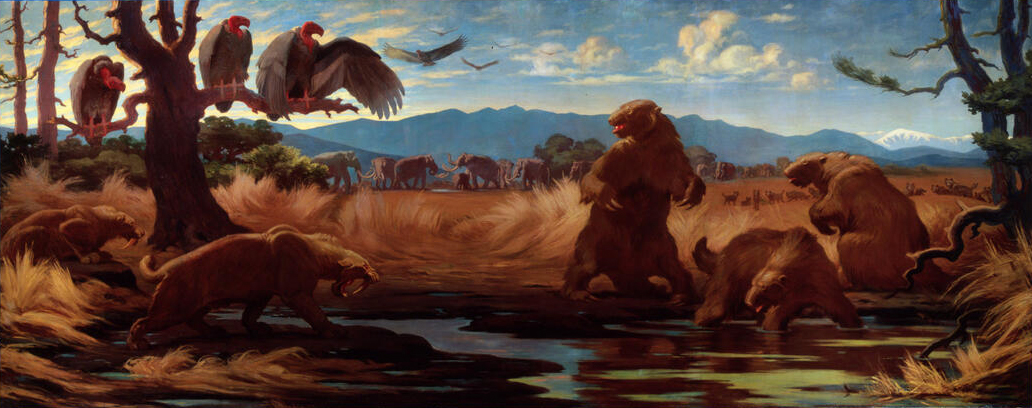
S. fatalis pair approaching a group of the ground sloth Paramylodon, one mired, at the La Brea Tar Pits, by Knight, 1921

Scientists debate whether Smilodon was social. One study of African predators found that social predators like lions and spotted hyenas respond more to the distress calls of prey than solitary species. Since S. fatalis fossils are common at the La Brea Tar Pits, and were likely attracted by the distress calls of stuck prey, this could mean that this species was social as well. One critical study claims that the study neglects other factors, such as body mass (heavier animals are more likely to get stuck than lighter ones), intelligence (some social animals, like the American lion, may have avoided the tar because they were better able to recognize the hazard), lack of visual and olfactory lures, the type of audio lure, and the length of the distress calls (the actual distress calls of the trapped prey animals would have lasted longer than the calls used in the study). The author of that study ponders what predators would have responded if the recordings were played in India, where the otherwise solitary tigers are known to aggregate around a single carcass. The authors of the original study responded that though effects of the calls in the tar pits and the playback experiments would not be identical, this would not be enough to overturn their conclusions. In addition, they stated that weight and intelligence would not likely affect the results as lighter carnivores are far more numerous than heavy herbivores and the social (and seemingly intelligent) dire wolf is also found in the pits. However, they do not rule out the possibility that Smilodon may have been solitary in part of its distribution.

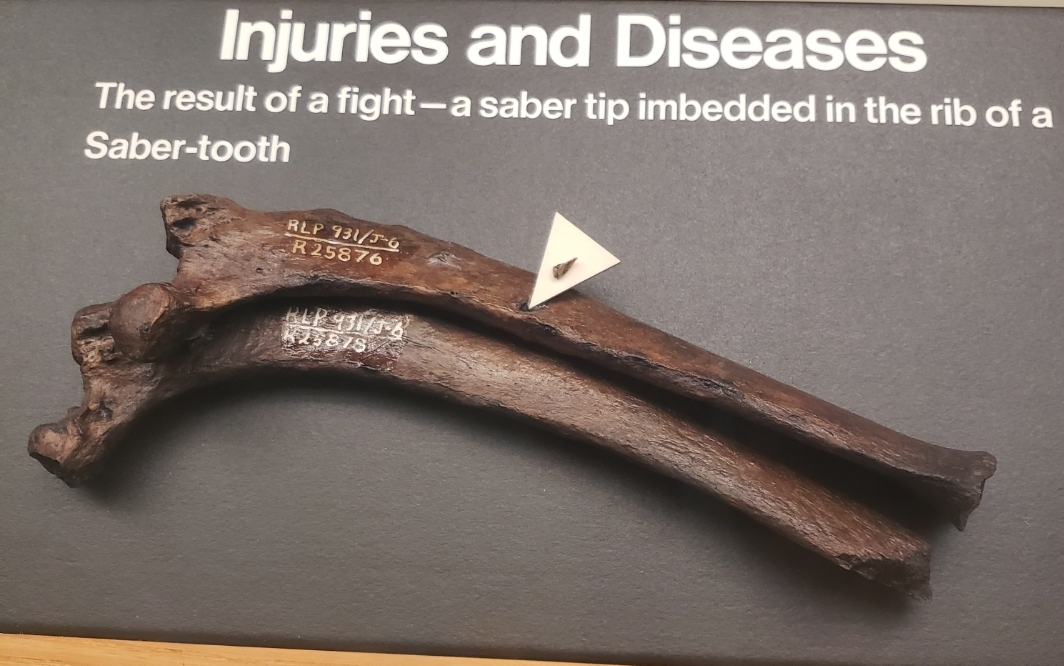
Tip of an S. fatalis canine imbedded in the rib of another S. fatalis, George C. Page Museum

Another argument for sociality is based on the healed injuries in several Smilodon fossils, which would suggest that the animals needed others to provide them food. This argument has been questioned, as cats can recover quickly from even severe bone damage and an injured Smilodon could survive if it had access to water. However, pathological analysis on dental injuries largely suggests that injured individuals ate softer flesh than non-injured individuals, the authors argued this, along with consideration the individuals survived for a good amount of time from the injuries, may be evidence of Smilodon forming social groups. In addition, a Smilodon suffering hip dysplasia at a young age that survived to adulthood suggests that it could not have survived to adulthood without aid from a social group, as this individual was unable to hunt or defend its territory due to the severity of its congenital issue. The brain of Smilodon was relatively small compared to other cat species. Some researchers have argued that Smilodon's brain would have been too small for it to have been a social animal. An analysis of brain size in living big cats found no correlation between brain size and sociality. Another argument against Smilodon being social is that being an ambush hunter in closed habitat would likely have made group-living unnecessary, as in most modern cats. Yet it has also been proposed that being the largest predator in an environment comparable to the savanna of Africa, Smilodon may have had a social structure similar to modern lions, which possibly live in groups primarily to defend optimal territory from other lions (lions are the only social big cats today).

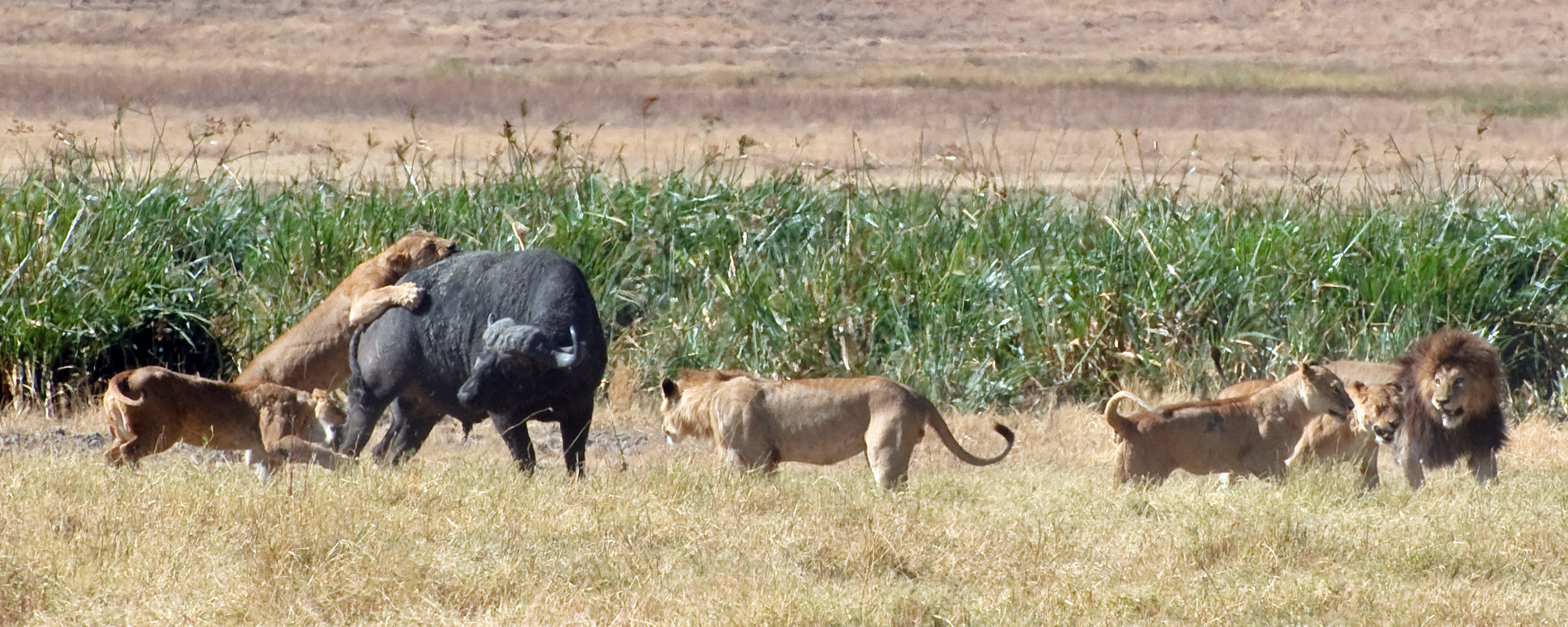
Lion pride attacking an African buffalo in Tanzania; Smilodon may also have hunted in groups

Whether Smilodon was sexually dimorphic has implications for its reproductive behavior. Based on their conclusions that Smilodon fatalis had no sexual dimorphism, Van Valkenburgh and Sacco suggested in 2002 that, if the cats were social, they would likely have lived in monogamous pairs (along with offspring) with no intense competition among males for females. Likewise, Meachen-Samuels and Binder concluded in 2010 that aggression between males was less pronounced in S. fatalis than in the American lion. Christiansen and Harris found in 2012 that, as S. fatalis did exhibit some sexual dimorphism, suggesting there would have been evolutionary selection for competition between males. They also argued because of the larger body size within male specimens, they would've preferred larger prey compared to females, possibly suggesting sexually determined resource partitioning. Due to the lack of skewed bias towards one sex, the authors concluded if S. fatalis was social, it probably lived in unisexual groups and practiced polygamy instead of monogamy.

Some bones show evidence of having been bitten by other Smilodon, possibly the result of territorial battles, competition for breeding rights or over prey. Two S. populator skulls from Argentina show seemingly fatal, unhealed wounds which appear to have been caused by the canines of another Smilodon (though it cannot be ruled out they were caused by kicking prey). If caused by intraspecific fighting, it may also indicate that they had social behavior which could lead to death, as seen in some modern felines (as well as indicating that the canines could penetrate bone). It has been suggested that the exaggerated canines of saber-toothed cats evolved for sexual display and competition, but a statistical study of the correlation between canine and body size in S. populator found no difference in scaling between body and canine size concluded it was more likely they evolved solely for a predatory function.

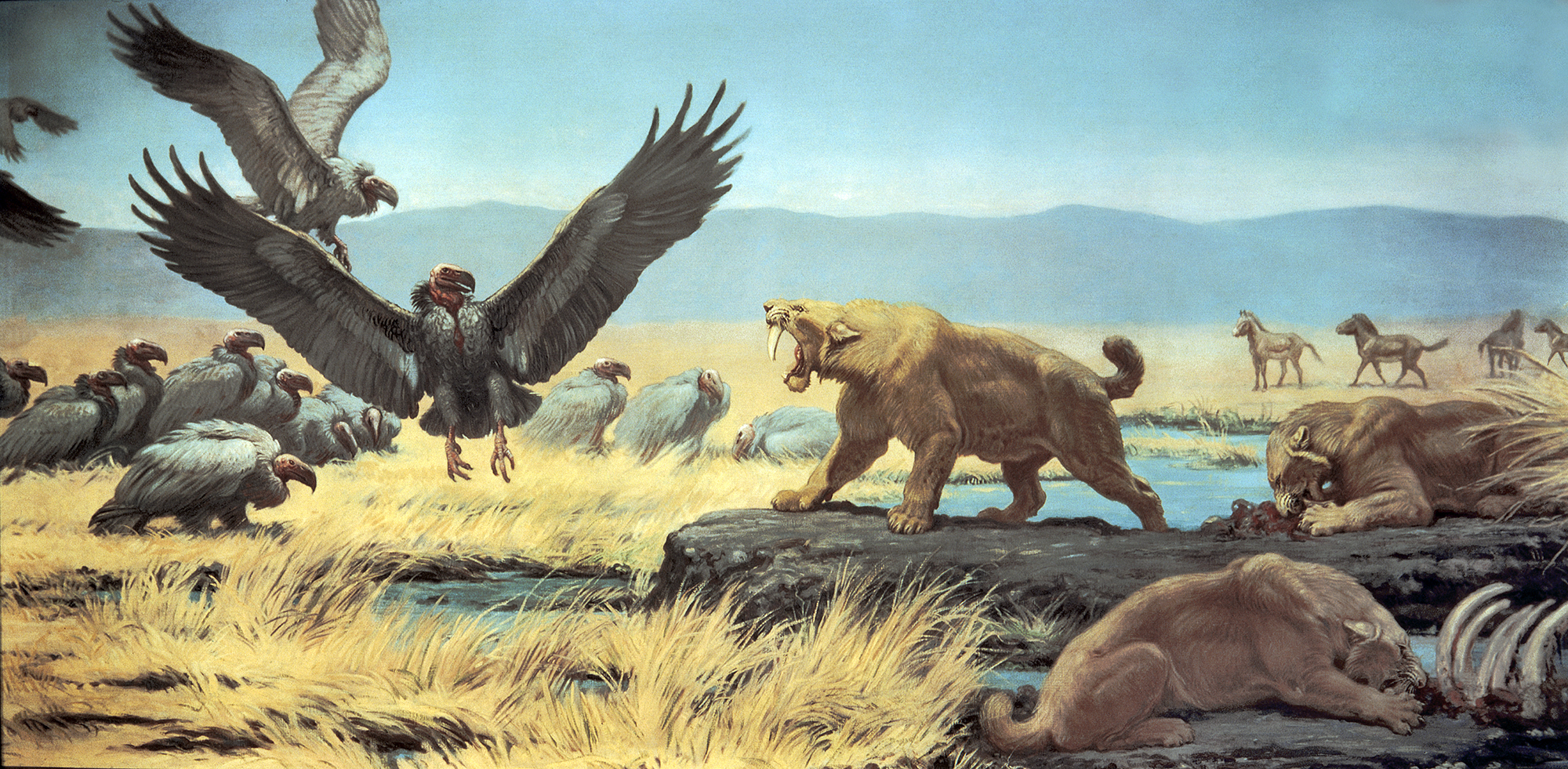
Restoration of a group of feeding S. fatalis in La Brea, one scaring away Teratornis, by Knight, 1931

A set of three associated skeletons of S. fatalis found in Ecuador and described in 2021 by Reynolds, Seymour, and Evans suggests that there was prolonged parental care in Smilodon. The two subadult individuals uncovered share a unique inherited trait in their dentaries, suggesting they were siblings; a rare instance of familial relationships being found in the fossil record. The subadult specimens are also hypothesized to have been male and female, respectively, while the adult skeletal remains found at the site are believed to have belonged to their mother. The subadults were estimated to have been around two years of age at the time of their deaths, but were still growing.

Different results in isotopic analysis studies may suggest S. populator social behavior varied depending on the locality. In the Pampean region of Argentina, Smilodon may have lived a gregarious lifestyle due tight clustering of isotopic values, which may suggest collective behavior. While in the Brazilian intertropical region, this species lived a more solitary lifestyle due to the lower percentage of prey in the optimum body mass interval, as gregarious predators have at least 65% of their prey within optimum body mass interval. If S. populator practiced a gregarious lifestyle, the optimal group size would have been around four individuals.

=== Development ===
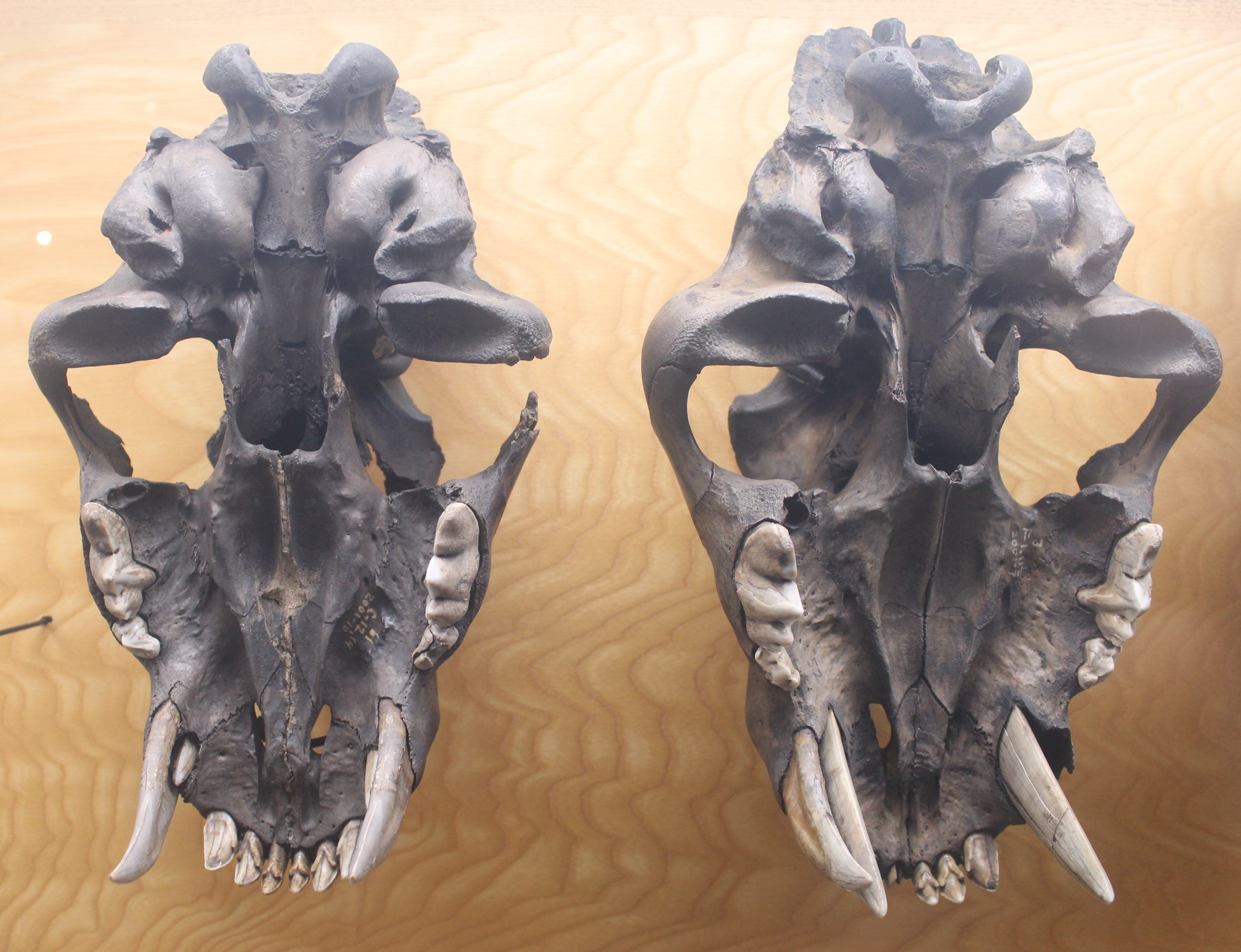
Undersides of S. fatalis skulls, showing canine replacement, George C. Page Museum

Smilodon started developing its adult saber-teeth when the animal reached between 12 and 19 months of age, shortly after the completion of the eruption of the cat's baby teeth. Both baby and adult canines would be present side by side in the mouth for an approximately 11-month period, and the muscles used in making the powerful bite were developed at about one-and-a-half years old as well, eight months earlier than in a modern lion. After Smilodon reached 23 to 30 months of age, the infant teeth were shed while the adult canines grew at an average growth rate of 7 mm (0.28 in) per month during a 12-month period. They reached their full size at around 3 years of age, later than modern species of big cats. Juvenile and adolescent Smilodon specimens are extremely rare at Rancho La Brea, where the study was performed, indicating that they remained hidden or at denning sites during hunts, and depended on parental care while their canines were developing. Finite element analysis and three-dimensional geometric morphometrics of the mandibles of juvenile S. fatalis show they were poorly suited for performing anchor bites, further suggesting an extended period of parental care for the species.

Juvenile S. fatalis skull with short canines, Dinosaur Museum, Dorchester

A 2024 study found evidence that adolescent Smilodon kept their milk sabers for extended periods (estimated at 30 months) to help reinforce their adult canines as they grew in. As a result, the milk sabers acted as a structural support, allowing them to begin hunting with minimized risk to their mature set of sabers. As a result, the retention of the cat's milk sabers lessened the bending strain on the cat's emerging adult teeth as it bit down, as it was discovered the erupting sabers were much more vulnerable to breakage as they grew in than when matured. This would have also resulted in Smilodon being "double-fanged" during this growth stage, as corroborated by the discovery of individuals at this ontogenic stage at Rancho La Brea.

A 2017 study indicates that juveniles were born with a robust build similar to the adults. Comparison of the bones of juvenile S. fatalis specimens from La Brea with those of the contemporaneous American lion revealed that the two cats shared a similar growth curve. Felid forelimb development during ontogeny (changes during growth) has remained tightly constrained. The curve is similar to that for modern cats such as tigers and cougars, but shifts more towards the robust direction of the axes than is seen in modern felids. Examinations by Reynolds, Seymour, and Evans (2021) suggest that Smilodon had a unique and fast growth rate similar to a tiger, but that there was a prolonged period of growth in the genus similar to what is seen in lions, and that the cubs were reliant on their parents until this growth period ended.

=== Paleopathology ===
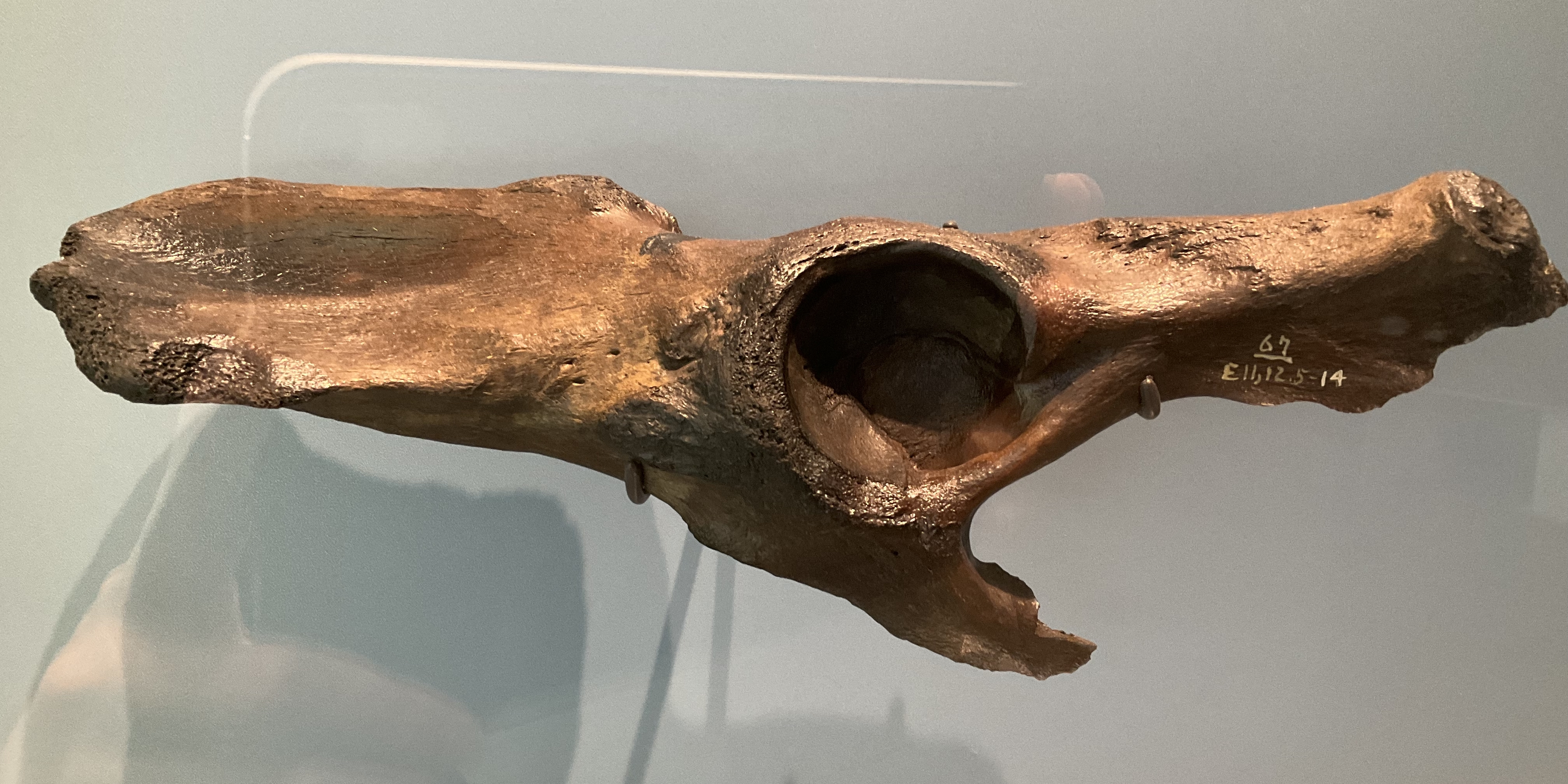
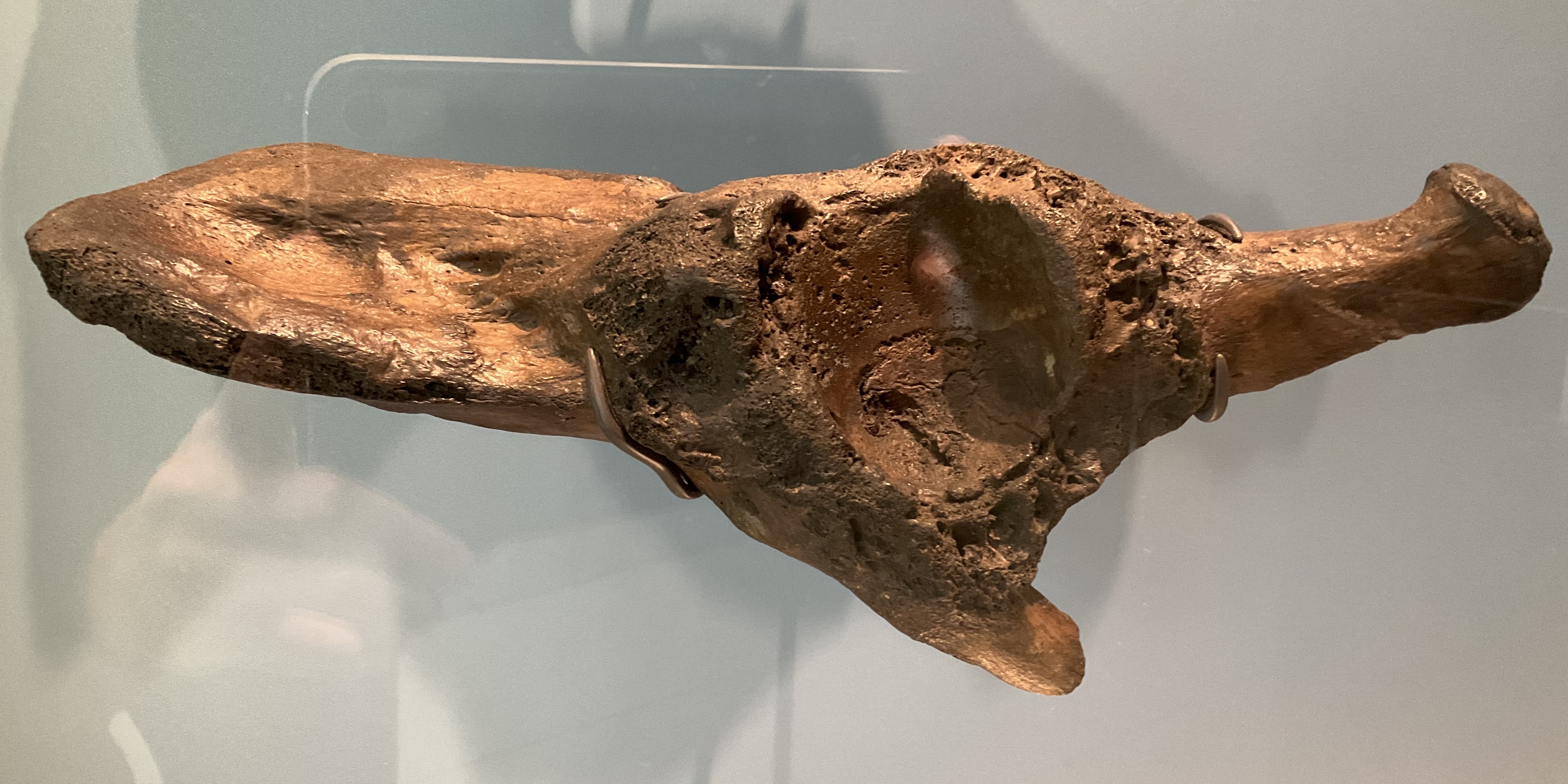
Healthy (top) and pathological (bottom) left pelvises of S. fatalis. The pathological hip may have suffered from hip dysplasia.

Several Smilodon fossils show signs of ankylosing spondylitis, hyperostosis and trauma. One study of 1,000 Smilodon skulls found that 36% of them had eroded parietal bones, which is where the largest jaw muscles attach. They also showed signs of microfractures, and the weakening and thinning of bones possibly caused by mechanical stress from the constant need to make stabbing motions with the canines. Bony growths where the deltoid muscle inserted in the humerus is a common pathology for a La Brea specimen, which was probably due to repeated strain when Smilodon attempted to pull down prey with its forelimbs. Sternum injuries are also common, probably due to collision with prey.

The frequency of trauma in S. fatalis specimens was 4.3%, compared to 2.8% in the dire wolf, which implies the ambush predatory behavior of the former led to greater risk of injury than the pursuit predatory behavior of the latter. Smilodon remains exhibit relatively more shoulder and lumbar vertebrae injuries. A 2023 study documented a high degree of subchondral defects in limb-joint surfaces of S. fatalis and dire wolf specimens from the La Brea Tar Pits that resembled osteochondrosis dissecans. As modern dogs with this disease are inbred, the researchers suggested this would have been the case for the prehistoric species as well as they approached extinction, but cautioned that more research was needed to determine if this was also the case in specimens from other parts of the Americas.

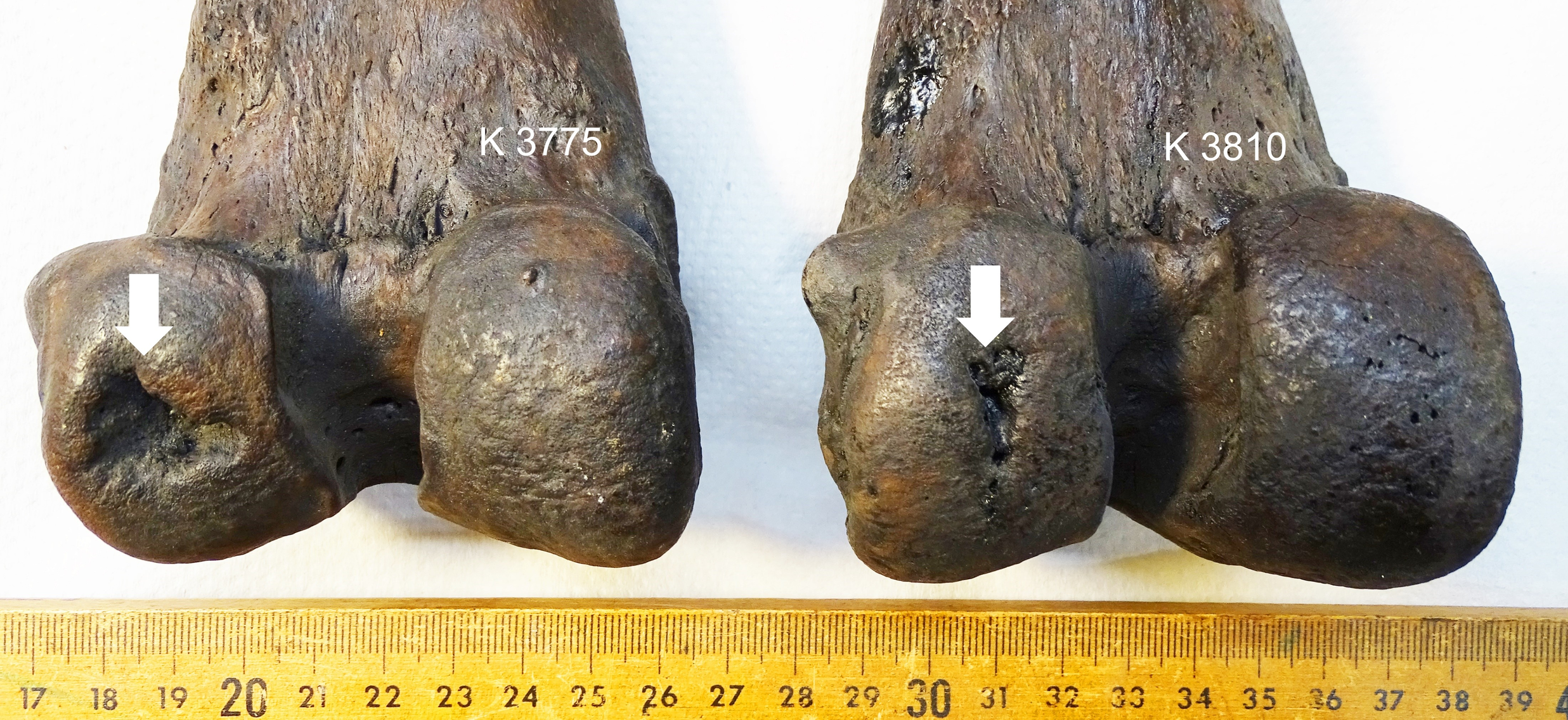
Large subchondral defects in S. fatalis limb-joints (arrows)

Some S. fatalis specimens from the La Brea Tar Pits exhibit substantially decreased mandibular cortical bone thickness, which has been interpreted as a consequence of nutritional stress in those individuals. The frequency of this low cortical bone thickness appears to have been variable over geologic time, being low during the time of the final demise of the species.

Osteomyelitis in the left fourth metacarpal bone has been reported in a S. populator specimen dating back to Marine Isotope Stage 5. This pathology resulted in the machairodont individual becoming incapable of flexing its toe and would have severely diminished its ability to hunt prey.

=== Natural traps ===
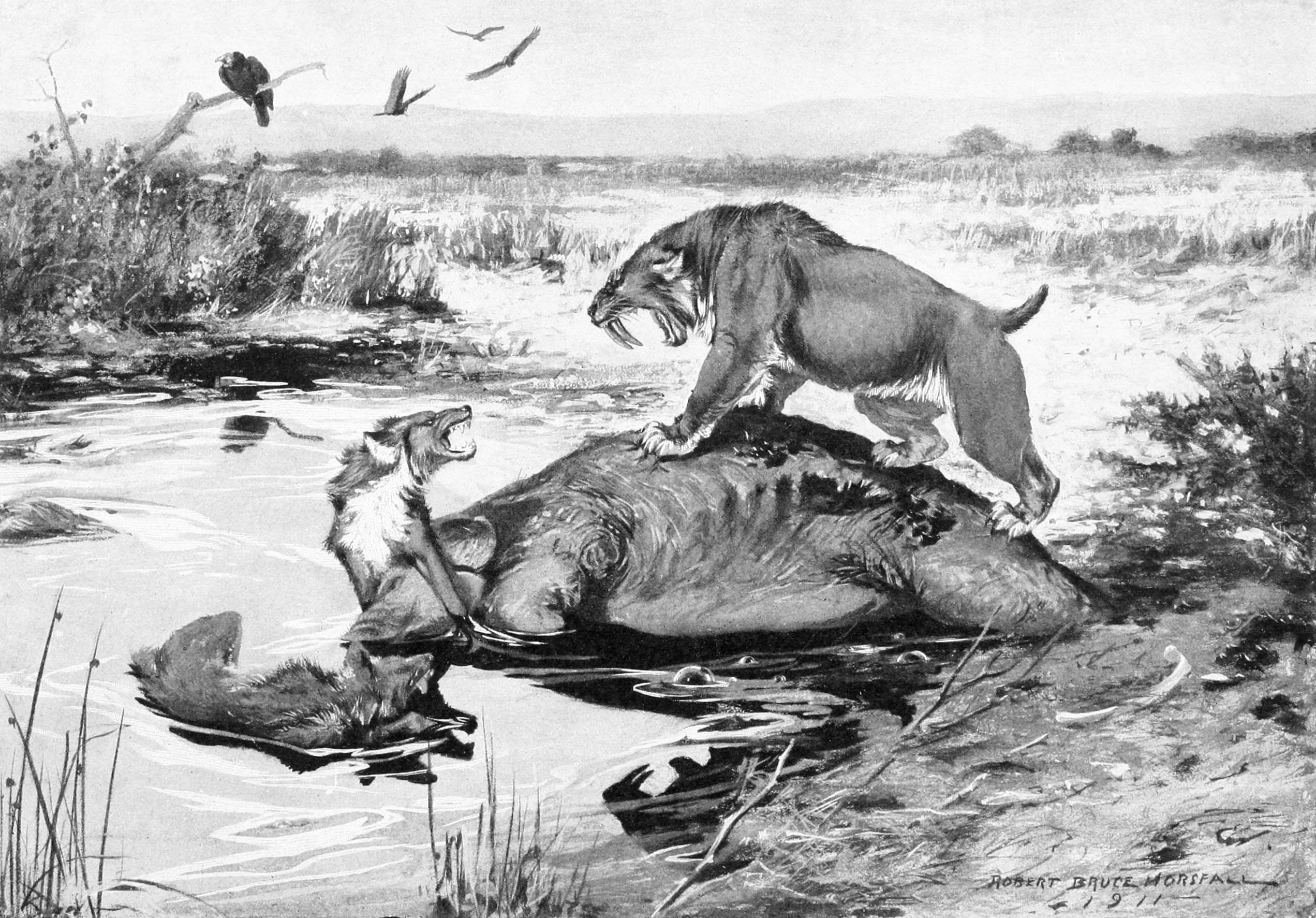
S. fatalis fighting dire wolves over a Columbian mammoth carcass in the La Brea Tar Pits, by Robert Bruce Horsfall, 1913

Many Smilodon specimens have been excavated from asphalt seeps that acted as natural carnivore traps. Animals were accidentally trapped in the seeps and became bait for predators that came to scavenge, but these were then trapped themselves. The best-known of such traps are at La Brea in Los Angeles, which have produced over 166,000 Smilodon fatalis specimens that form the largest collection in the world. The sediments of the pits there were accumulated 40,000 to 10,000 years ago, in the Late Pleistocene. Though the trapped animals were buried quickly, predators often managed to remove limb bones from them, but they were themselves often trapped and then scavenged by other predators; 90% of the excavated bones belonged to predators.

The Talara Tar Seeps in Peru represent a similar scenario, and have also produced fossils of Smilodon. Unlike in La Brea, many of the bones were broken or show signs of weathering. This may have been because the layers were shallower, so the thrashing of trapped animals damaged the bones of previously trapped animals. Many of the carnivores at Talara were juveniles, possibly indicating that inexperienced and less fit animals had a greater chance of being trapped. Though Lund thought accumulations of Smilodon and herbivore fossils in the Lagoa Santa Caves were due to the cats using the caves as dens, these are probably the result of animals dying on the surface, and water currents subsequently dragging their bones to the floor of the cave, but some individuals may also have died after becoming lost in the caves.

== Distribution and habitat ==
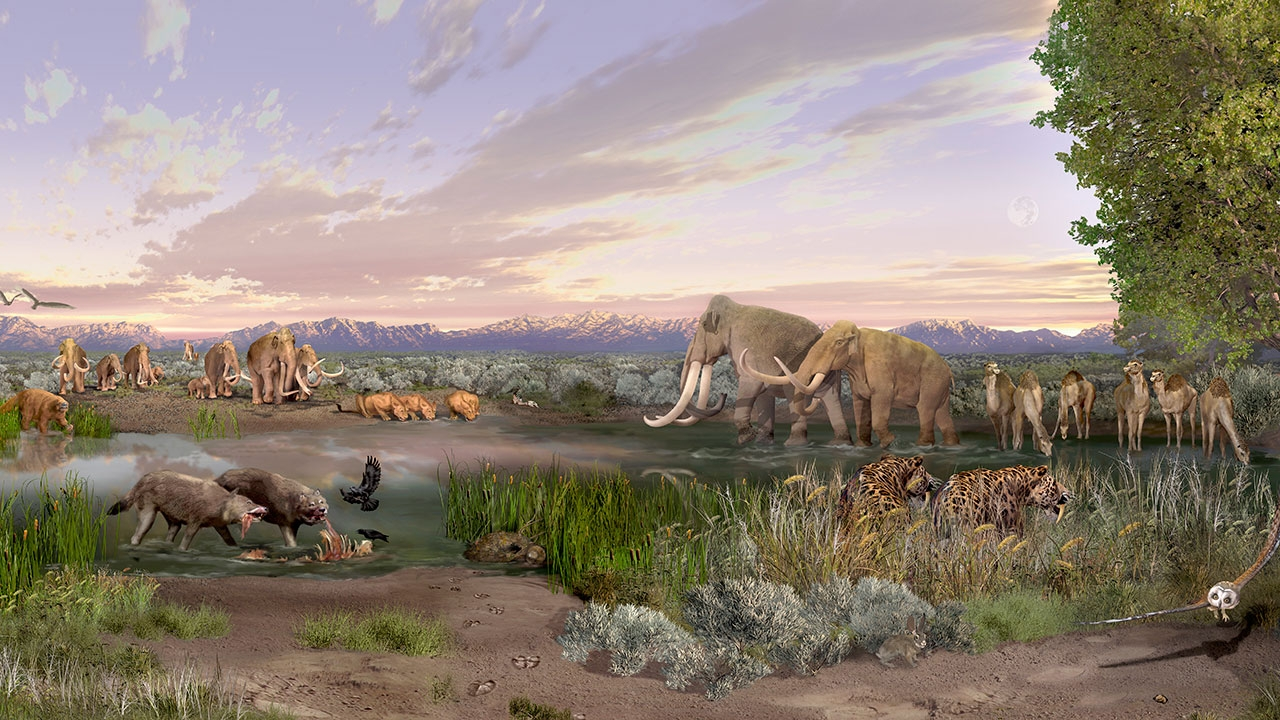
Environment of what is now White Sands National Park, with S. fatalis in the reeds in the right foreground

Smilodon lived during the Pleistocene epoch (2.5 mya–10,000 years ago), and was perhaps the most recent of the saber-toothed cats. S. fatalis lived in a variety of habitats, being able to inhabit open grassland and parkland, marginal woodland-grassland settings, and closed forests. Fossils of the genus have been found throughout the Americas. The northernmost remains of the genus are S. fatalis fossils from Alberta, Canada, with the southernmost remains of S. populator being known from the far south of Patagonia, near the Strait of Magellan. The habitat of North America varied from subtropical forests and savannah in the south, to treeless mammoth steppes in the north. The mosaic vegetation of woods, shrubs, and grasses in southwestern North America supported large herbivores such as horses, bison, antelope, deer, camels, mammoths, mastodons, and ground sloths. North America also supported other saber-toothed cats, such as Homotherium and Xenosmilus, as well as other large carnivores including dire wolves, short-faced bear (Arctodus simus) and the American lion.

Animals that participated in the Great American Interchange, with North American migrants like S. populator (lower right) in blue

S. gracilis entered South America during the early to middle Pleistocene, where it probably gave rise to S. populator, which lived in the eastern part of the continent. S. fatalis also entered western South America in the late Pleistocene, and the two species were thought to be divided by the Andes mountains. However, in 2018, a skull of S. fatalis found in northern Uruguay east of the Andes was reported, which puts the idea that the two species were allopatric (geographically separated) into question. In 2025, another skull of S. fatalis was reported from the Dolores Formation in southern Uruguay, where S. populator remains have also been discovered, providing further support to the idea that both species likely coexisted and potentially had interspecific hybridization. The American interchange resulted in a mix of native and invasive species sharing the prairies and woodlands in South America; North American herbivores included proboscideans, horses, camelids and deer, South American herbivores included toxodonts, litopterns, ground sloths, and glyptodonts. The native metatherian predators, the Sparassodonta, had gone extinct by the Pliocene, and were replaced by North American carnivores such as canids, bears, and large cats.

By the Early Pleistocene, S. populator and Arctotherium angustidens were the only two top predators in South America to have reached a body mass of over 200 kg (440 lb), the latter of which went extinct during the Middle Pleistocene. S. populator preferred large prey from open habitats such as grassland and plains, based on evidence gathered from isotope ratios that determined the animal's diet. In this way, the South American Smilodon species was probably similar to the modern lion. S. populator probably competed with the canid Protocyon there, but not with the jaguar, which fed primarily on smaller prey. On the other hand, morphometry points to S. populator being best adapted for more closed environments.

== Extinction ==
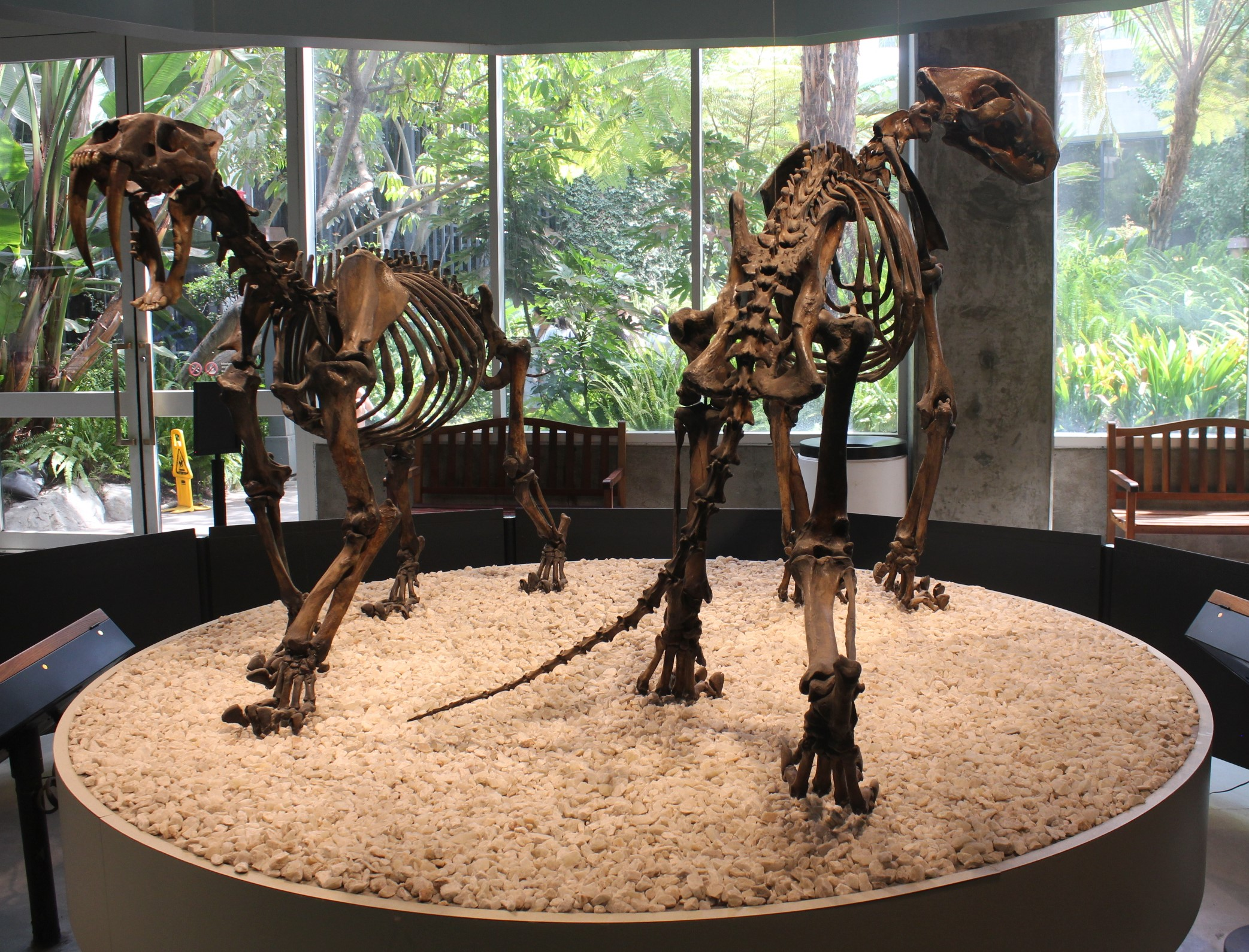
Skeletons of S. fatalis (left) and the American lion, two large North American felids which went extinct during the Late Pleistocene, George C. Page Museum

Along with most of the New World Pleistocene megafauna, Smilodon became extinct by 10,000 years ago in the late Pleistocene extinction phases of North and South America. Its extinction has been linked to the decline and extinction of large herbivores. Hence, Smilodon could have been too specialized at hunting large prey and may have been unable to adapt. Indeed, by the Bølling–Allerød warming event and before the Younger Dryas cooling event, S. fatalis showed changes in cranial morphology that hint towards increased specialization in larger prey and/or evolution in response to competition with other carnivores. Originally, it was hypothesized that the higher levels of dental fractures among La Brea carnivores suggested prey availability was low, at least seasonally, which forced carnivores to consume their prey fully. However, this hypothesis was called into by a 2012 study, as they argued that larger predators have relatively weaker teeth, with the likely reason of tooth breakage being the result of consumption of large prey. DMTA analysis found that La Brea carnivorans utilized carcasses less than some extant carnivorans, with Smilodon having a decline of tough tissue consumption, but no increase in bone consumption. Other explanations include climate change and competition with Homo sapiens (who entered the Americas around the time Smilodon disappeared), or a combination of several factors, all of which apply to the general Late Pleistocene extinction event, rather than specifically to the extinction of the saber-toothed cats. One factor often cited here is the cooling in the Younger Dryas, which may have drastically reduced the habitable space for many species. In terms of human influence, there is evidence of a fire-induced regime change in Rancho la Brea that preceded the extirpation of megafauna in the area, with humans most likely responsible for the increase in fire intensity.

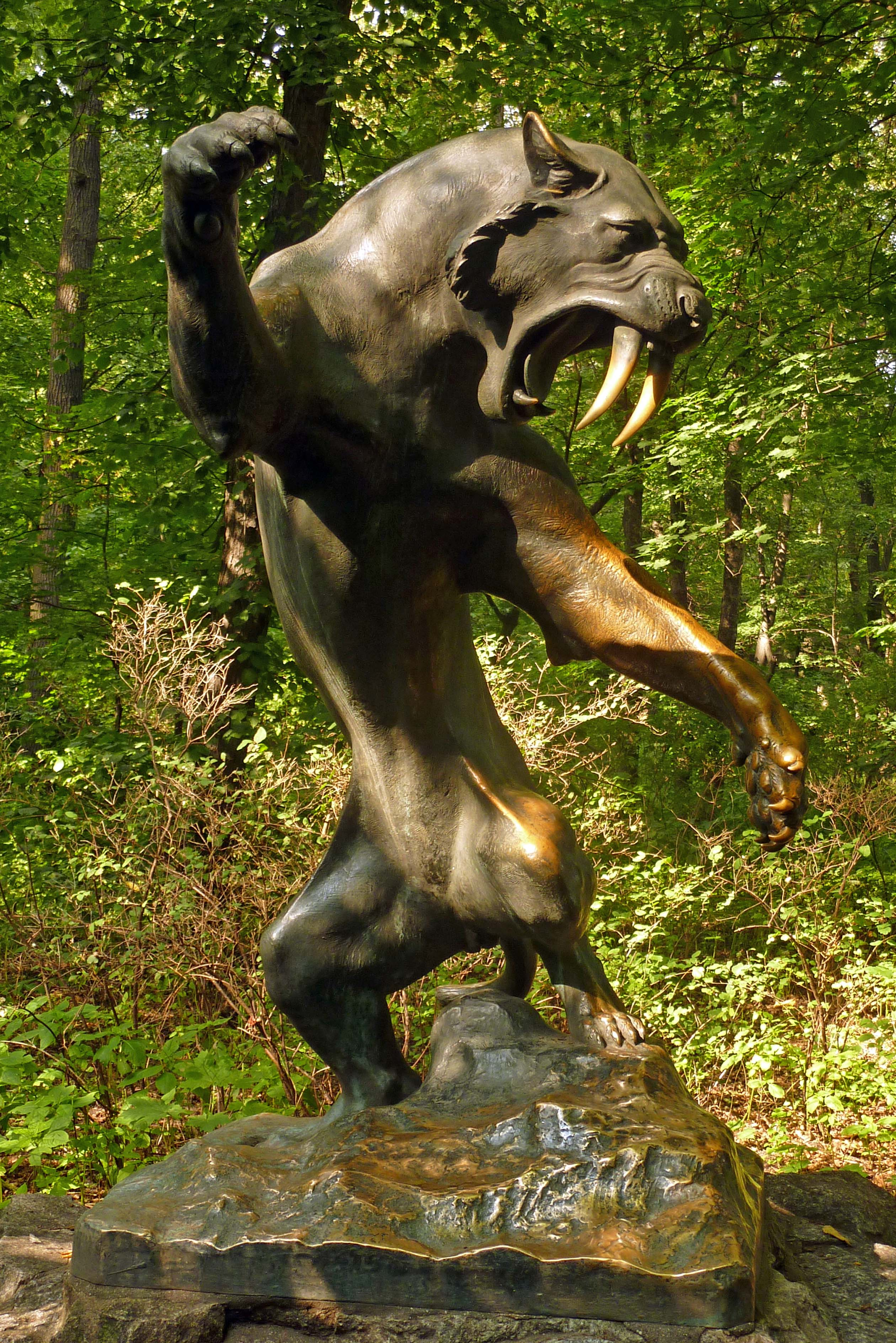
S. populator statue in Tierpark Berlin

Writers of the first half of the twentieth century theorized that the last saber-toothed cats, Smilodon and Homotherium, became extinct through competition with the faster and more generalized felids that replaced them. It was even proposed that the saber-toothed predators were inferior to modern cats, as the ever-growing canines were thought to inhibit their owners from feeding properly. Since then, however, it has been shown that the diet of machairodontines such as Smilodon and Homotherium was diverse. They do not seem to have been limited to giant animals as prey, as suggested before, but fed on whatever was available, including bovines, equines and camelids. Additionally, non-machairodontine felids such as the American lion and Miracinonyx also became extinct during the Late Pleistocene, and saber-toothed and conical toothed felids had formerly coexisted for more than a million years. The fact that saber-teeth evolved many times in unrelated lineages also attests to the success of this feature.

The youngest direct radiocarbon date for S. fatalis differs from that of S. populator by thousands of years, the former just before the Younger Dryas cooling event and the latter by the early Holocene. The latest S. populator specimen from the Jirau Paleontological Site has been dated to 8,189–9,079 years cal. Before Present (BP), while the latest S. fatalis specimen recovered from the Rancho La Brea tar pits has been dated to 13,025 years ago. A specimen of S. fatalis from Iowa dates to 13,605–13,455 years Before Present (BP). Smilodon populator remains found in the cave of Cueva del Medio, near the town of Soria, northeast Última Esperanza Province, Magallanes Region in southernmost Chile have been dated to 10,935–11,209 years ago. The most recent credible carbon-14 date for S. fatalis has been given as 11,130 BP. However, such radiocarbon dates are likely uncalibrated, meaning that they were not adjusted from calendar years to regular years. As a result, the dates appear younger than they actually are. Therefore, the S. fatalis specimen from Rancho La Brea is the youngest-recorded of the species, suggesting extinction before the Younger Dryas based on its last appearance in California as opposed to other regions where megafauna declined by the Younger Dryas.

== See also ==
- List of largest carnivorans
- List of largest prehistoric carnivorans
- Megafauna
- Late Pleistocene extinctions

== Bibliography ==
- Antón, M. (2013). Sabertooth (1st ed.). Bloomington: Indiana University Press. ISBN 978-0-253-01042-1. OCLC 857070029.
