= List of largest primates =

Largest primates

This is a list of large extant primate species that can be ordered by average weight or height range. There is no fixed definition of a large primate, so the length of the list is somewhat arbitrary. Primates exhibit the highest levels of sexual dimorphism amongst mammals, with males generally being larger than females within the given size ranges. The size ranges describe typical values and may not include the full extremes among all observed specimens.

Mandrills and baboons are monkeys; the rest of the species on this list are apes. Typically, Old World monkeys (paleotropical) are larger than New World monkeys (neotropical); the reasons for this are not entirely understood but several hypotheses have been generated. As a rule, primate brains are "significantly larger" than those of other mammals with similar body sizes.

== Largest primates ==
Image	Species	Binomial name	Weight range (kg)	Length (cm)	Height (cm)	Native area	Family	Range map
	Eastern gorilla	Gorilla beringei	70 (small female) – 200 (large male)	150 (female adult average) – 185 (male adult average)	150–195	East Africa	Hominidae	
	Western gorilla	Gorilla gorilla	58–200	150–170	125 (female adult average) – 175 (male adult average)	West Africa	Hominidae	
	Human	Homo sapiens	59 (female adult average) – 77 (male adult average)		159 (female adult average) – 171 (male adult average)	African origin with settlements worldwide	Hominidae	
	Bornean orangutan	Pongo pygmaeus	30–100	100–170	100–140	Borneo	Hominidae	
	Sumatran orangutan	Pongo abelii	45–90	120–150	90–170	Sumatra	Hominidae	
	Tapanuli orangutan	Pongo tapanuliensis	40 (female adult average) – 75 (male adult average)	120–150	120–150	Sumatra	Hominidae	
	Chimpanzee	Pan troglodytes	27–70	63–93	100–170	Sub-Saharan Africa	Hominidae	
	Bonobo	Pan paniscus	34–60	70–83	110–119	Sub-Saharan Africa	Hominidae	
	Mandrill	Mandrillus sphinx	10–36	70–95	80	West Africa	Cercopithecidae	
	Chacma baboon	Papio ursinus	12–32	50–115	50–75	Southern Africa	Cercopithecidae	
	Olive baboon	Papio anubis	10–24	50–114	55–70	Sub-Saharan Africa	Cercopithecidae	

== See also ==
- Largest wild canids
- List of largest land carnivorans
- Monkey
- Great apes
- List of heaviest land mammals
- Largest mammals
- Sexual dimorphism in non-human primates
