= Largest wild canids =

List of the largest wild canid species

This is a list of extant species in the Canidae family ordered by average weights of adult individuals in the wild. It does not include canid hybrids, domesticated animals, or extinct canids like Epicyon haydeni, which exceeded living canids in size. Only wild species of canids are included, all of which are described as species by authentic sources.

== List ==
Rank	Species	Binomial name	Image	Maximum weight (kg)	Weight range (kg)	Maximum length (m) (Note: This refers to the length including the tail. Note that lengths given as "between the pegs" generally include the tail.)	Length range (m)	Shoulder height (cm)	Native range by continent(s)	Range map
1	Grey Wolf	Canis lupus		79; 86(verified); 103 (unverified)	14–65	2.13-2.5	1.4-1.90	97	North America and Eurasia	
2	Red wolf	Canis rufus		40	23-39	1.7	1.2-1.65	80	North America	
3	Eastern wolf	Canis lycaon		36.7	23-30	1.8	0.91-1.65	70	North America	
4	Maned wolf	Chrysocyon brachyurus		36	20-30	1.9	1.5-1.8	107	South America	
5	African wild dog	Lycaon pictus		36	20-30	1.5	1.10-1.40	75	Africa	
6	Coyote	Canis latrans		33.91	8-20	1.5	1.0-1.3	70	North America	
7	Dhole	Cuon alpinus		25	10-21	1.45	0.9-1.3	56	Asia	
8	Ethiopian wolf	Canis simensis		20	11-19	1.45	1.1-1.4	62	Africa	
9	African wolf	Canis lupaster		19.7	7-14	1.50	1.2-1.4	40	Africa	
10	Red fox	Vulpes vulpes		17.2	2-14	1.5	0.76-1.4	50	North America, Eurasia, Africa	
11	Side-striped jackal	Lupulella adusta		15	6.5-14	0.95	0.69-0.81	50	Africa	
12	Golden jackal	Canis aureus		14.9	6-14	1.25	0.69-0.85	45-50	Eurasia	
13	Culpeo fox	Lycalopex culpaeus		14	5-13.5	1.52	0.94-1.33	45-65	South America	
14	Black-backed jackal	Lupulella mesomelas		13	6-12	130	0.90-110	48	East Africa and Southern Africa	150px

== See also ==
- List of largest mammals
- Largest organisms
- List of largest land carnivorans
- List of largest wild cats
