= List of largest land carnivorans =

The following list contains the largest terrestrial members of the order Carnivora, ranked in accordance to their maximum mass in the wild.

== List ==
Rank	Common name	Scientific name	Family	Image	Average mass (kg) in the wild	Maximum mass (kg) in the wild	Average length (m) in the wild	Maximum length (m) in the wild	Average shoulder height (m) in the wild	Native range
1	Polar bear	Ursus maritimus	Ursidae		360-700	1002	2.5 - 3.0	3.4	1.60	North America, Eurasia
2	Brown bear	Ursus arctos	Ursidae		270-635	751 (in the wild, possibly more)	1.5 - 3.0	3.4	1.53	North America, Eurasia, formerly Africa
3	American black bear	Ursus americanus	Ursidae		159-226	409-500	1.4 - 2.0	2.41	1.10	North America
4	Tiger	Panthera tigris	Felidae		227-300	388.78 (disputed)	2.5 - 3.9	4.17	1.32	Asia
5	Lion	Panthera leo	Felidae		190-272	375 (in the wild; disputed)	2.5 - 3.3	3.9	1.4	Africa, Asia.
6	Spectacled bear	Tremarctos ornatus	Ursidae		100-190	220	1.2 - 1.9	2.0	1.0	South America
7	Asiatic black bear	Ursus thibetanus	Ursidae		90-190	200	1.3 - 1.9	2.0	1.10	Asia
8	Sloth bear	Melursus ursinus	Ursidae		90-140	192	1.2 - 1.9	2.0	0.90	Asia
9	Jaguar	Panthera onca	Felidae		100-125	160	1.6 - 2.5	2.8	0.90	North America, South America
10	Giant panda	Ailuropoda melanoleuca	Ursidae		85-120	160	1.5 - 1.9	2.0	1.0	Asia
11	Cougar	Puma concolor	Felidae		53.1–71	105.2 (Verified) 125.2 (Unverified)	1.5 - 2.4	2.8	0.53 - 0.88	North and South America
12	Leopard	Panthera pardus	Felidae		30–65.8	100	1.6 - 2.3	2.75	0.44 - 0.78	Africa, Europe and Asia
13	Gray wolf	Canis lupus	Canidae		14–65	79 (verified); 86 (verified); 103 (unverified)	1.4 - 1.90	2.13- 2.5	0.97	North America and Eurasia
14	Spotted hyena	Crocuta crocuta	Hyaenidae		44.5–70	90	0.95 - 1.6	1.3	0.75	Africa
15	Sun bear	Helarctos malayanus	Ursidae		25-65	90	1.0 - 1.40	1.50	0.70	Asia
16	Brown hyena	Parahyaena brunnea	Hyaenidae		37.7–40.2	72.6	1.44	1.70	0.70 - 0.88	Africa
17	Cheetah	Acinonyx jubatus	Felidae		36.7–54.1	69	1.5 - 2.3	2.5	0.77 - 0.94	Africa, Asia
18	Striped hyena	Hyaena hyaena	Hyaenidae		26-41	55	0.85 - 1.30	1.50	0.60 - 0.80	Africa, Asia
19	Snow leopard	Panthera uncia	Felidae		42	53.8	1.6 - 2.1	2.5	0.60 - 0.66	Asia
20	Red wolf	Canis rufus	Canidae		23-39	40	1.2 - 1.65	1.7	0.80	North America
21	Eurasian lynx	Lynx lynx	Felidae		17.4–21.7	38	0.80 - 1.3	1.5	0.60 - 0.71	Asia, Europe
22	Eastern wolf	Canis lycaon	Canidae		23-30	36.7	0.91-1.65	1.8	0.70	North America
23	Maned wolf	Chrysocyon brachyurus	Canidae		20-30	36	1.5 - 1.8	1.9	0.90	South America
24	African wild dog	Lycaon pictus	Canidae		20-30	36	1.10 - 1.40	1.5	0.75	Africa
25	Coyote	Canis latrans	Canidae		8-20	33.91	1.0 - 1.3	1.5	0.70	North America
26	Wolverine	Gulo gulo	Mustelidae		7-27,5	32	0.65 - 1.09	1.10	0.36 - 0.45	North America, Eurasia
27	European badger	Meles meles	Mustelidae		6–7.95	27.2	1.10	0.25 - 0.30		Eurasia
28	Bobcat	Lynx rufus	Felidae		6.4–18.3	22.2 (Verified) 27 (Unverified)	0.475 - 1.25	1.30	0.30 - 0.60	North America
29	Clouded leopard	Neofelis nebulosa	Felidae		16–23	26	1.2 - 1.6	1.9	0.46 - 0.56	Asia
30	Dhole	Cuon alpinus	Canidae		10-21	25	0.9 - 1.3	1.45	0.56	Asia

== See also ==
- List of largest mammals
- List of largest cats
- Largest organisms
- List of largest wild canids

== Bibliography ==
- Mills, Gus; Hofer, Heribert (1998). Hyaenas: status survey and conservation action plan (PDF). IUCN/SSC Hyena Specialist Group. ISBN 978-2-8317-0442-5. Archived from the original (PDF) on 6 May 2013.
- Pocock, R. I. (1941). The Fauna of British India. Vol. 2 Mammals. London: Taylor and Francis.
