= List of largest mammals =

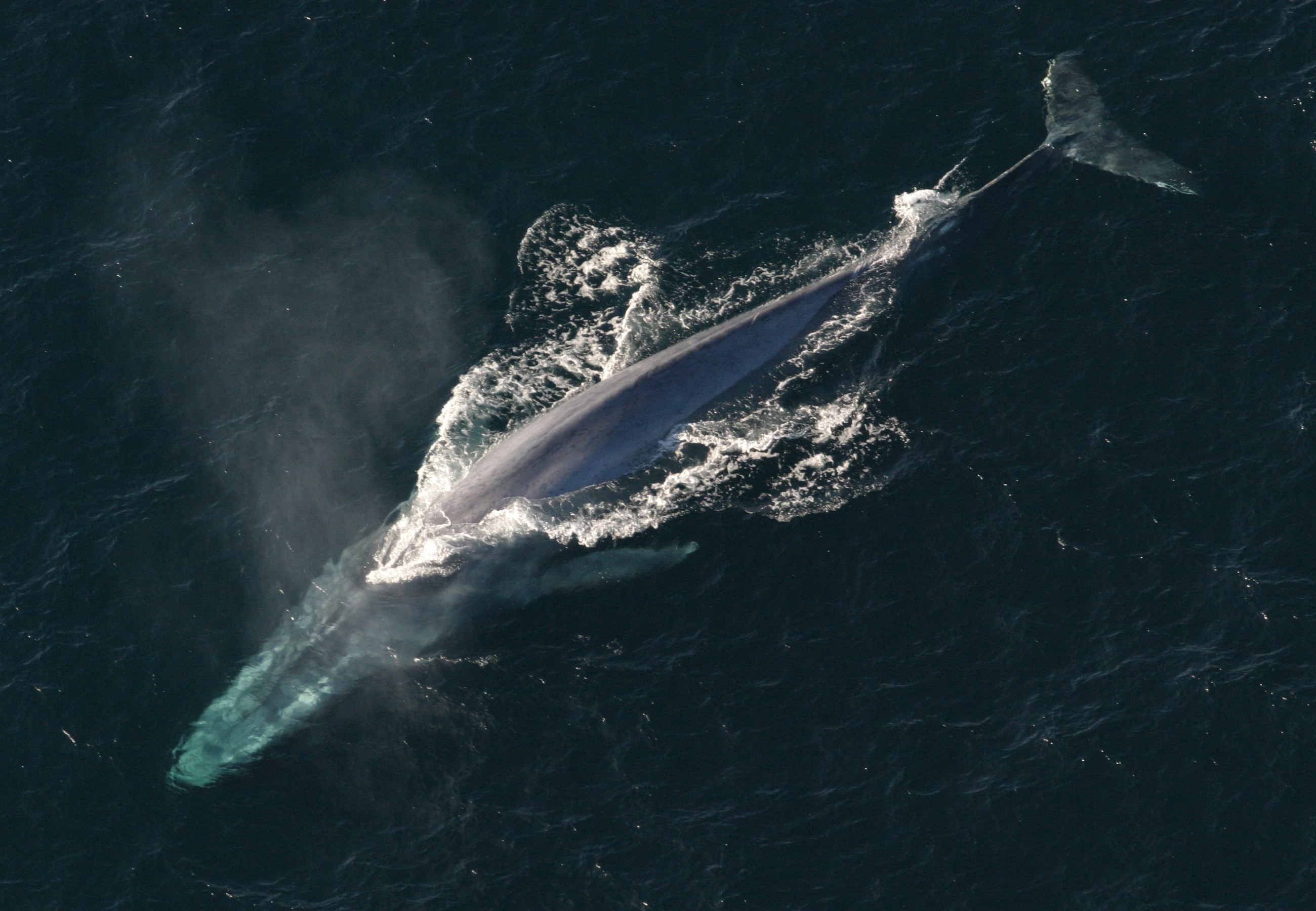
The largest creature of all time, the blue whale, is a mammal.

The following is a list of largest mammals by family.

== Tenrecs and allies (Afrosoricida) ==
- The largest of these insectivorous mammals is the giant otter shrew (Potamogale velox), native to Central Africa. This species can weigh up to 1 kilogram (2.2 lb) and measure 0.64 metres (2.1 ft) in total length.
- The larger of the two species of bibymalagasy (Plesiorycteropus madagascariensis), extinct tenrec relatives from Madagascar, is estimated to have weighed from 10 to 18 kilograms (21 to 40 lb).

== Even-toed ungulates (Artiodactyla) ==
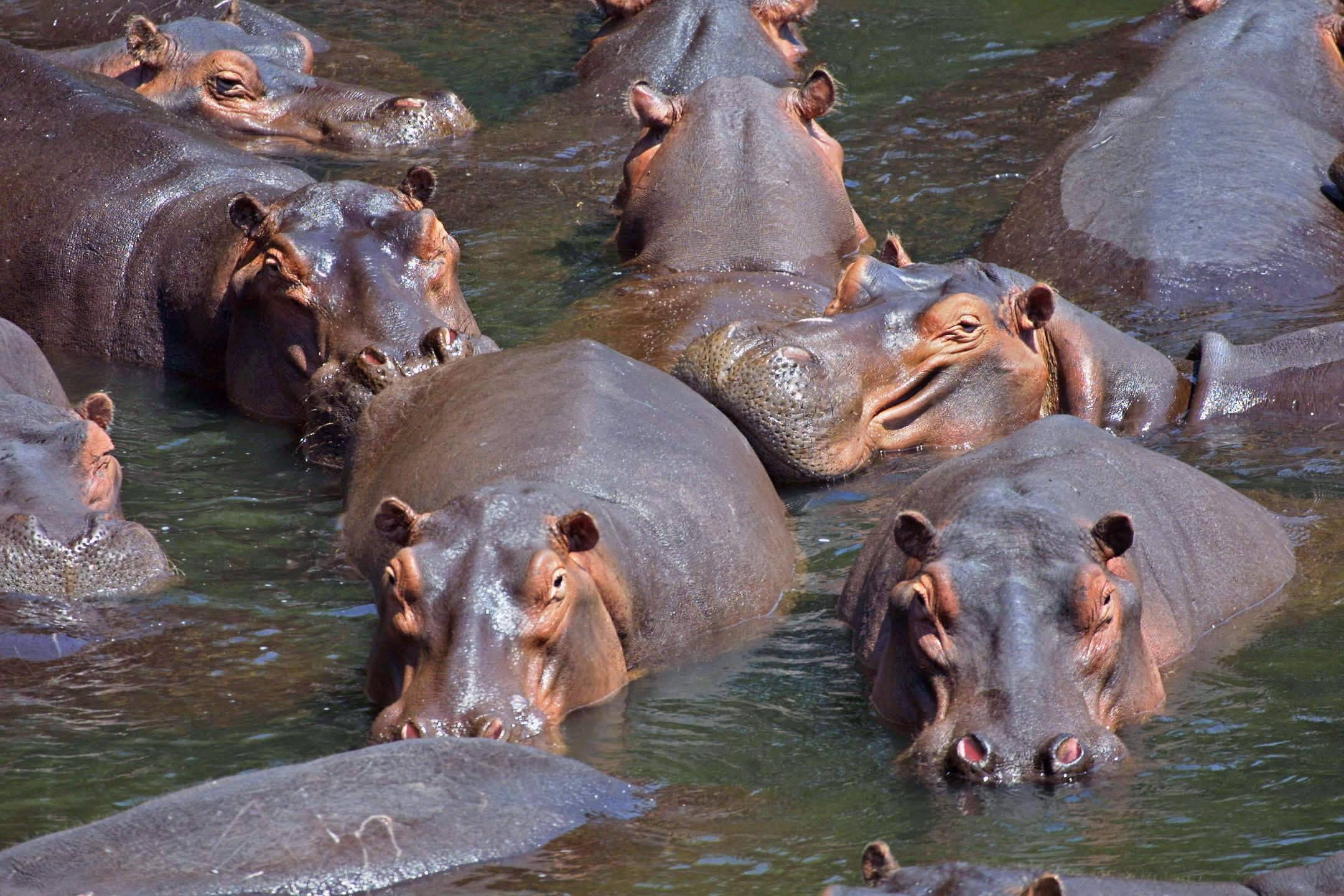
The hippopotamus is the most massive of the even-toed ungulates.

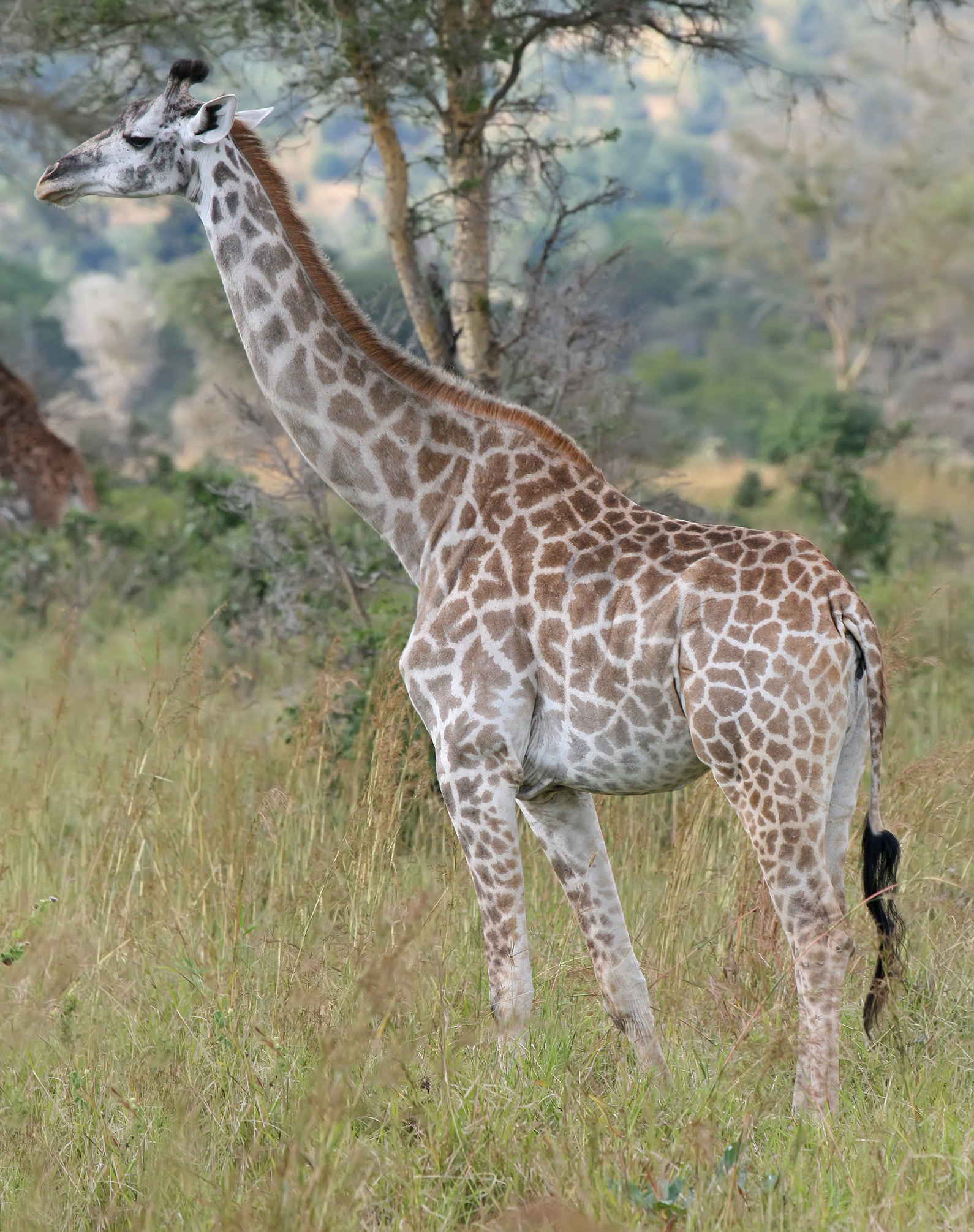
The giraffe is the tallest living land animal.

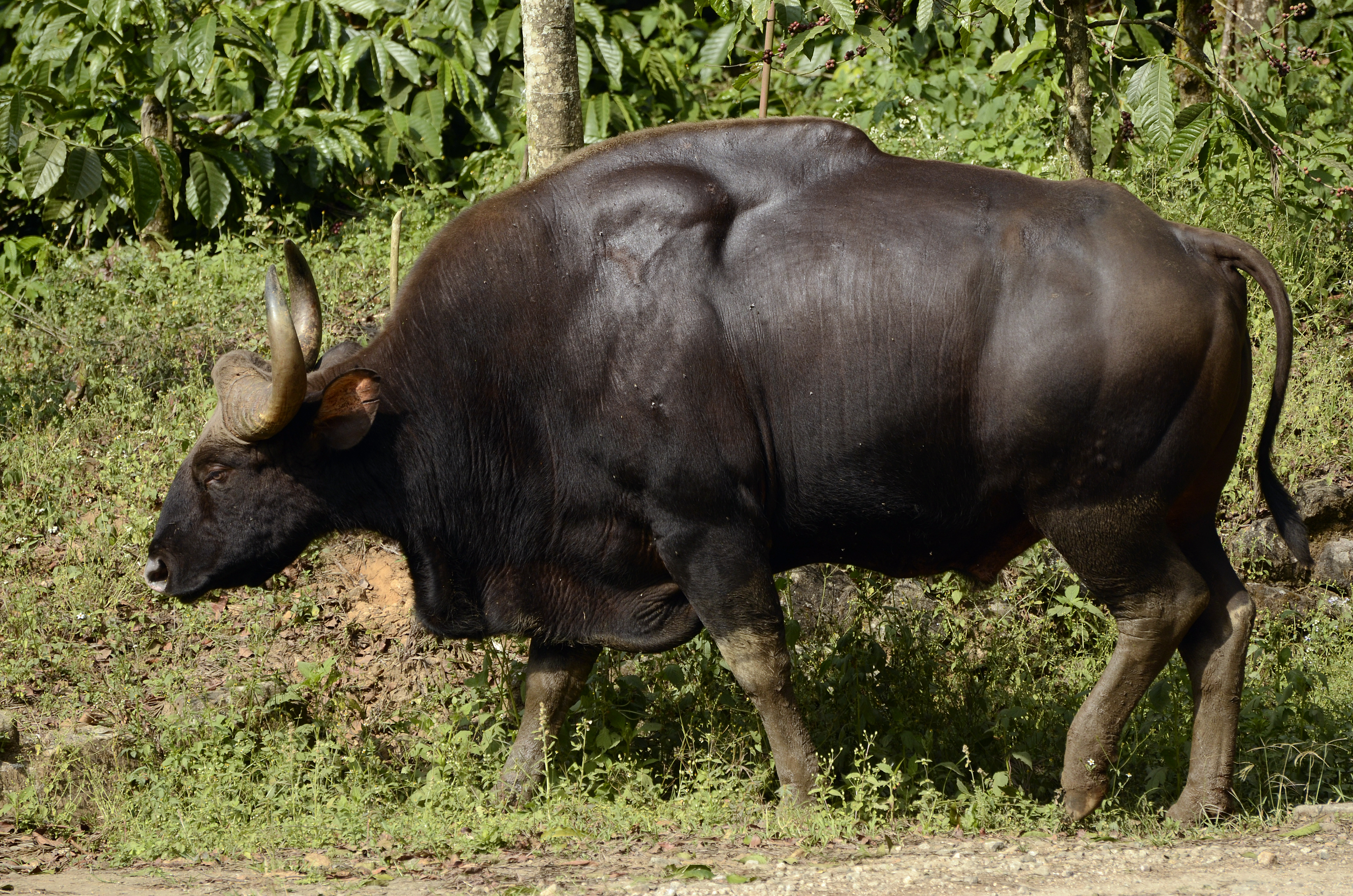
The Gaur is the largest extant bovid.

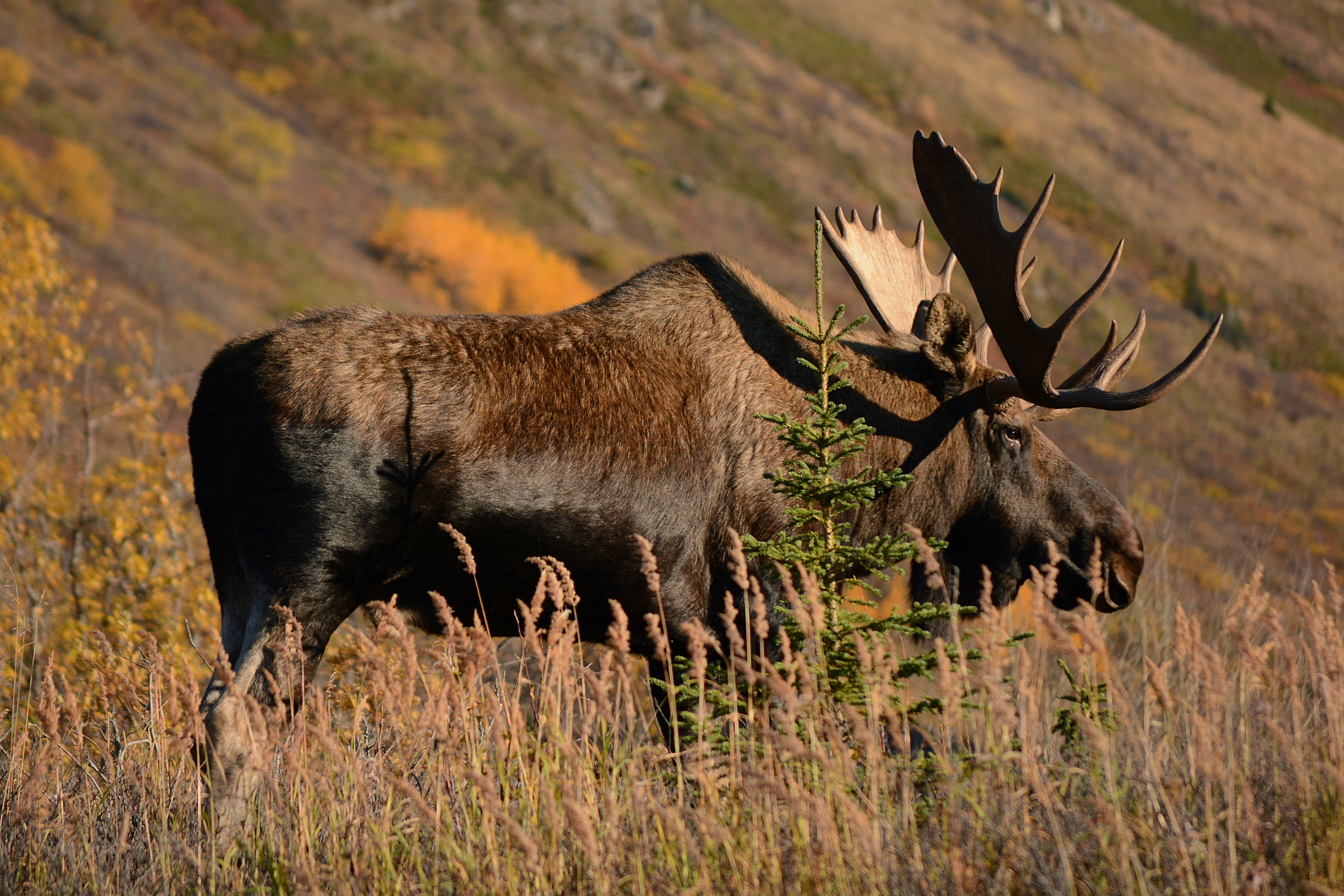
The moose is the largest living deer.

- The largest species in terms of weight is the hippopotamus (Hippopotamus amphibius), native to the rivers of sub-Saharan Africa. They can attain a size of 4,500 kg (9,900 lb), 5.05 m (16.6 ft) long and 1.66 m (5.4 ft) tall. Prehistoric hippos such as H. gorgops and H. antiquus rivaled or exceeded the modern species as the largest members of the family and order to ever exist.
- The longest-bodied species, and tallest of all living land animals, is the giraffe (Giraffa sp.), measuring up to 5.8 m (19 ft) tall to the top of the head, and despite being relatively slender, reaching a top weight of 2,000 kg (4,400 lb).
- The largest extant representative of the bovids, a diverse and well-known family, is the Asian forest-dwelling gaur (Bos gaurus), in which bulls can weigh up to 1,500 kg (3,300 lb), 4.5 m (15 ft) in total length and stand 2.2 m (7.2 ft) at the shoulder. The wild yak (B. mutus) reaches 2.05 m (6.7 ft) in height, and a weight of 1,200 kg (2,600 lb). The living American bison (B. bison) of North America is 2 to 3.5 m (6.6 to 11.5 ft) long, the tail adding 30 to 91 cm (12 to 36 in). Shoulder heights in the species can range from 152 to 201 cm (60 to 79 in). Weights can range from 318 to 1,270 kg (701 to 2,800 lb). The European bison (B. bonasus) may be less heavy than the American species, but would exceed heights at withers with the tallest record of 210 cm (83 in). When raised in captivity and farmed for meat, the bisons can grow unnaturally heavy and the largest semidomestic American bison weighed 1,724 kg (3,801 lb) and the heaviest European bison weighed about 1,900 kg (4,200 lb). The heads and forequarters of American species are massive, and both sexes have short, curved horns that can grow up to 2 ft (61 cm) long, which they use in fighting for status within the herd and for defense. Wild water buffaloes (Bubalus arnee) of Asia are larger and heavier than domestic buffaloes, and weigh from 700 to 1,200 kg (1,500 to 2,600 lb). Their head-to-body-length is 240 to 300 cm (94 to 118 in) with a tail 60 to 100 cm (24 to 39 in) long, and a shoulder height of 150 to 190 cm (59 to 75 in). Both sexes carry horns that are heavy at the base and widely spreading up to 2 m (79 in) The extinct giant bison (Bison latifrons) may be the largest bovid in the fossil record, with an estimated shoulder up to 2.5 m (8.2 ft) and a weight over 2,000 kg (4,400 lb). Pelorovis also reached 2,000 kg in weight. Domestic cattle (Bos taurus) are usually smaller, although obese steers have been reported to weigh up to 2,140 kg (4,720 lb). The largest antelope is the giant eland (Taurotragus derbianus) from Africa. They are typically between 220 and 290 cm (7.2 and 9.5 ft) in head-and-body length, stand approximately 130 to 180 cm (4.3 to 5.9 ft) at the shoulder, and weigh 400 to 1,000 kg (880 to 2,200 lb).
- The largest species in the pig family is generally the giant forest hog (Hylochoerus meinertzhageni), a native of the African rainforests, at up to 275 kg (606 lb), 2.55 m (8.4 ft) in length and 1.1 m (3.6 ft) high at the shoulder. Although wild boars (Sus scrofa) have reportedly reached 320 kg (710 lb) historically, especially the Manchurian subspecies (Sus scrofa ussuricus) and obese domestic pigs (S. domesticus) which have been weighed at 1,157 kg (2,551 lb). The largest wild suid to ever exist was Kubanochoerus gigas, having measured up to 550 kg (1,210 lb) and stood more than 1.3 m (4.3 ft) tall at the shoulder.
- The largest living cervid is the moose (Alces alces), particularly the Alaskan subspecies (A. a. gigas), verified at up to 820 kg (1,810 lb), a total length of 3.5 m (11 ft) and a shoulder height of 2.4 m (7.9 ft). The largest deer of all time was C. latifrons estimated to have reached 2.1 m (6 ft 11 in) to 2.4 m (7 ft 10 in) high at the shoulder. With the body mass of C. latifrons was around 1,000 kg (2,200 lb). In some cases, this species could have weighed perhaps up to 1,200 kg (2,600 lb) with the largest specimens perhaps reaching 2.5 m (8.2 ft) at the shoulder. It, the extinct Irish elk (Megaloceros giganteus) and the stag-moose (Cervalces scotti) were of similar size to the Alaskan moose. However, the Irish elk could have antlers spanning up to 4.3 m (14 ft) across, about twice the maximum span for a moose's antlers.
- The largest members of the camel family are either the bactrian camel (Camelus bactrianus), which is still wild in the steppe of central Asia, or the similarly sized dromedary (Camelus dromedarius), which no longer exists as a purely wild species but is widespread in the Middle East as a domestic animal, with a large introduced feral population in Australia. Both camels can weigh up to 1,000 kg (2,200 lb), 4 m (13 ft) in total length, 2.5 m (8.2 ft) tall at the shoulder and a height of 3.45 m (11.3 ft) at the hump. Several larger "giant camels" are known from fossils, including Gigantocamelus, Titanotylopus, and Megatylopus. An extinct species of camel from Syria, also known as the "Syrian camel", may have been even larger, at an estimated shoulder height of 3.6 or even 4 m (12–13 ft).

=== Whales (Cetacea) ===
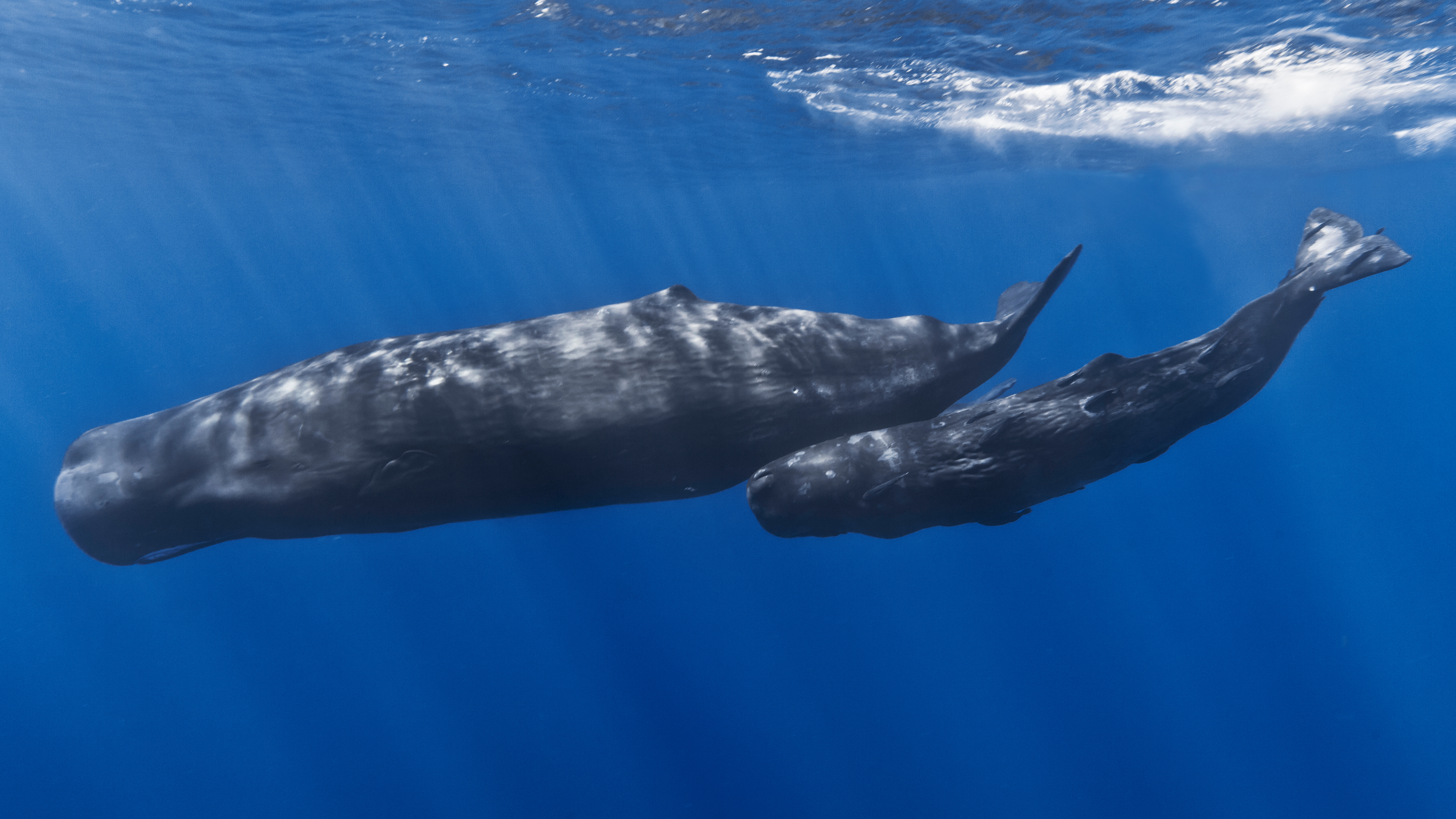
Sperm whales are the largest of all toothed whales.

- The largest whale (and largest mammal, as well as the largest animal known ever to have existed) is the blue whale, a baleen whale (Mysticeti). The longest confirmed specimen was 33.58 m (110.17 ft) in length and the heaviest was 190 tonnes. Its closest competitors are also baleen whales, the fin whale (Balaenoptera physalus), which can reach a size of 27 m (89 ft) in length and weight of 109 tonnes, and the bowhead (Balaena mysticetus) and North Pacific right whale (Eubalaena japonica), both measured up to 21.2 m (70 ft) and estimated at that length to weigh about 133 tonnes.
- The largest toothed whale (Odontoceti) is the sperm whale (Physeter macrocephalus), bulls of which usually range up to 18.2 m (60 ft) long and a mass of 50 tonnes.
- The orca or killer whale (Orcinus orca) is the largest species of the oceanic dolphin family. The largest orca ever recorded was a male off the coast of Japan, measuring 9.8 m (32 ft) long and weighed 10 tonnes.
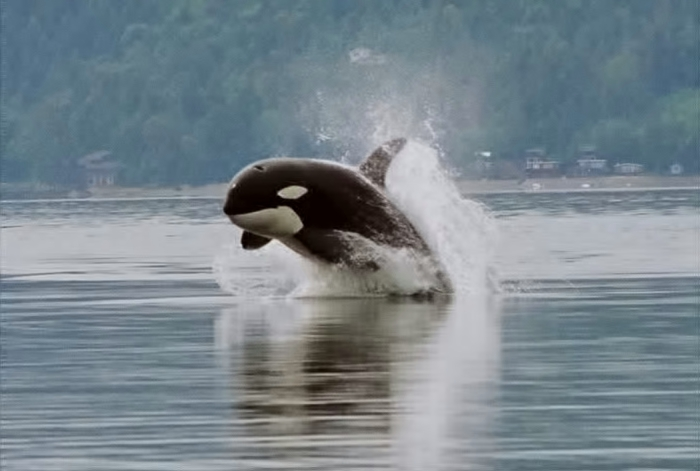
  The orca is the largest oceanic dolphin.
- The largest porpoise is the Dall's porpoise (Phocoenoides dalli), at up to 220 kg (490 lb) and 2.3 m (7.5 ft) in length.
- The largest beaked whale is the Baird's beaked whale (Berardius bairdii) at up to 14 tonnes and 13 m (43 ft) long.
- The largest of the beluga and narwhal is the beluga whale (Delphinapterus leucas). Adult male beluga whales can range from 3.5 to 5.5 m (11 to 18 ft), while the females measure 3 to 4.1 m (9.8 to 13.5 ft).
- The largest river dolphin is the Amazon river dolphin (Inia geoffrensis) from Amazon basin at a length of 1.53 to 2.4 m (5.0 to 7.9 ft), depending on subspecies. Females are typically larger than males. The largest female Amazon river dolphins can range up to 2.5 m (8.2 ft) long.
- Fragmentary fossils of extinct rorquals from the Pliocene epoch suggest they rivaled the size of the largest whales today.
- Perucetus, the largest Archaeoceti, has an estimated length exceeding 17.0–20.1 meters and weight ranging from 85–340 t which also rivaled the size of the largest whales today. However, a 2024 study proposed a much smaller size of 17 m to 20 m and 98-114t. With a 2025 study further downsizing it to 15m to 16m and 35-40t.

== Carnivorans (Carnivora) ==
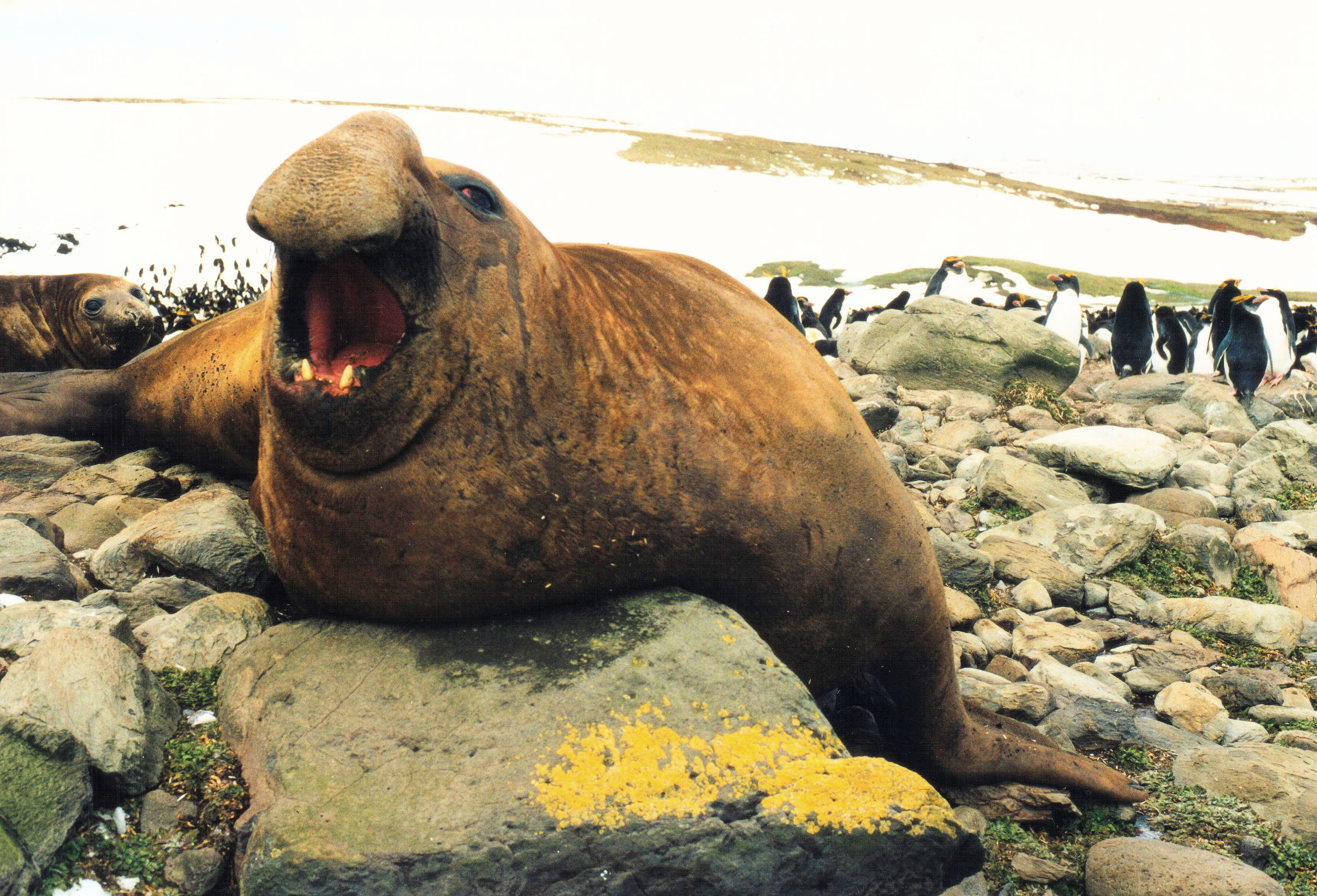
A beachmaster southern elephant seal

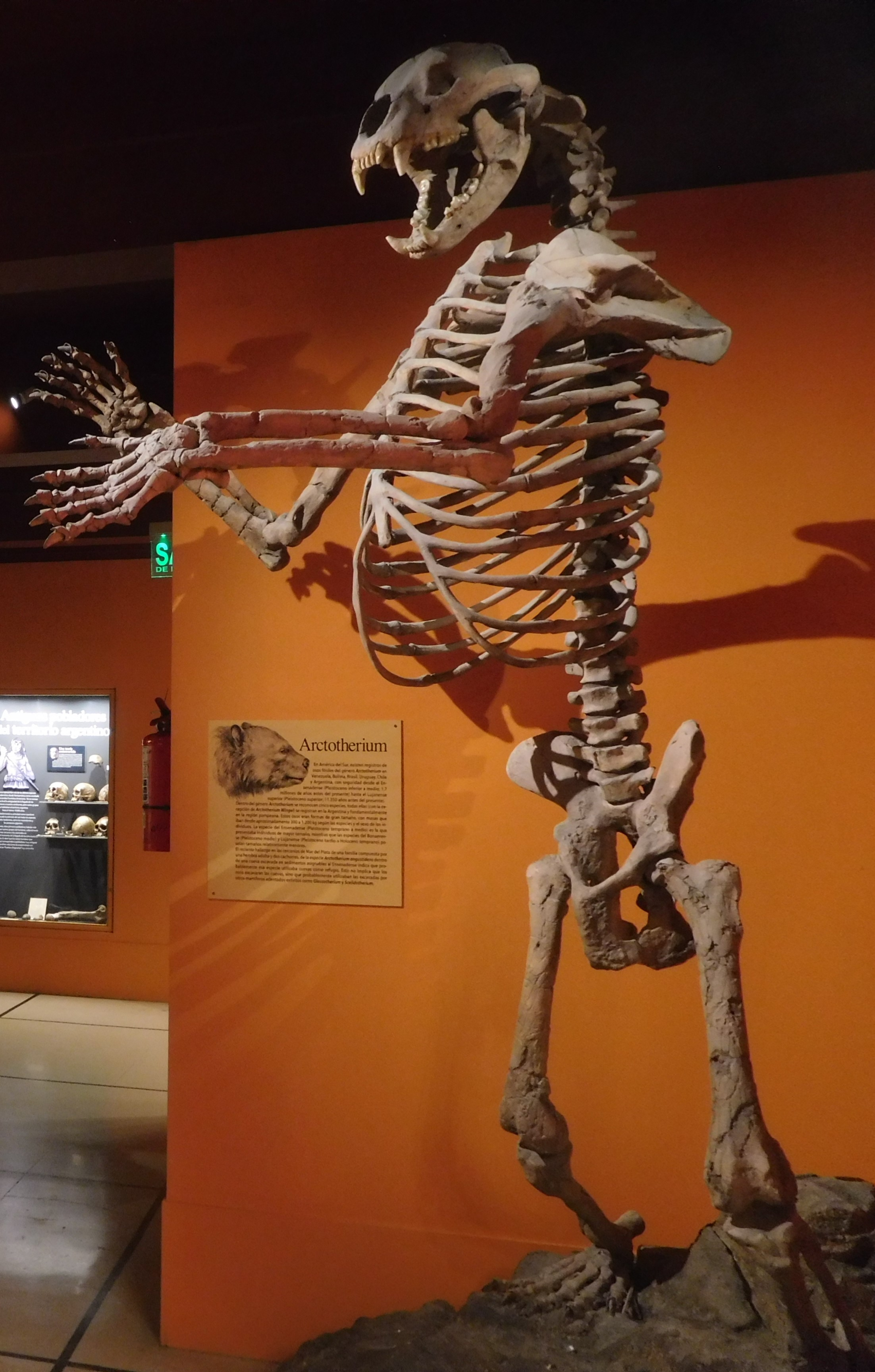
Arctotherium was the largest bear to ever live.

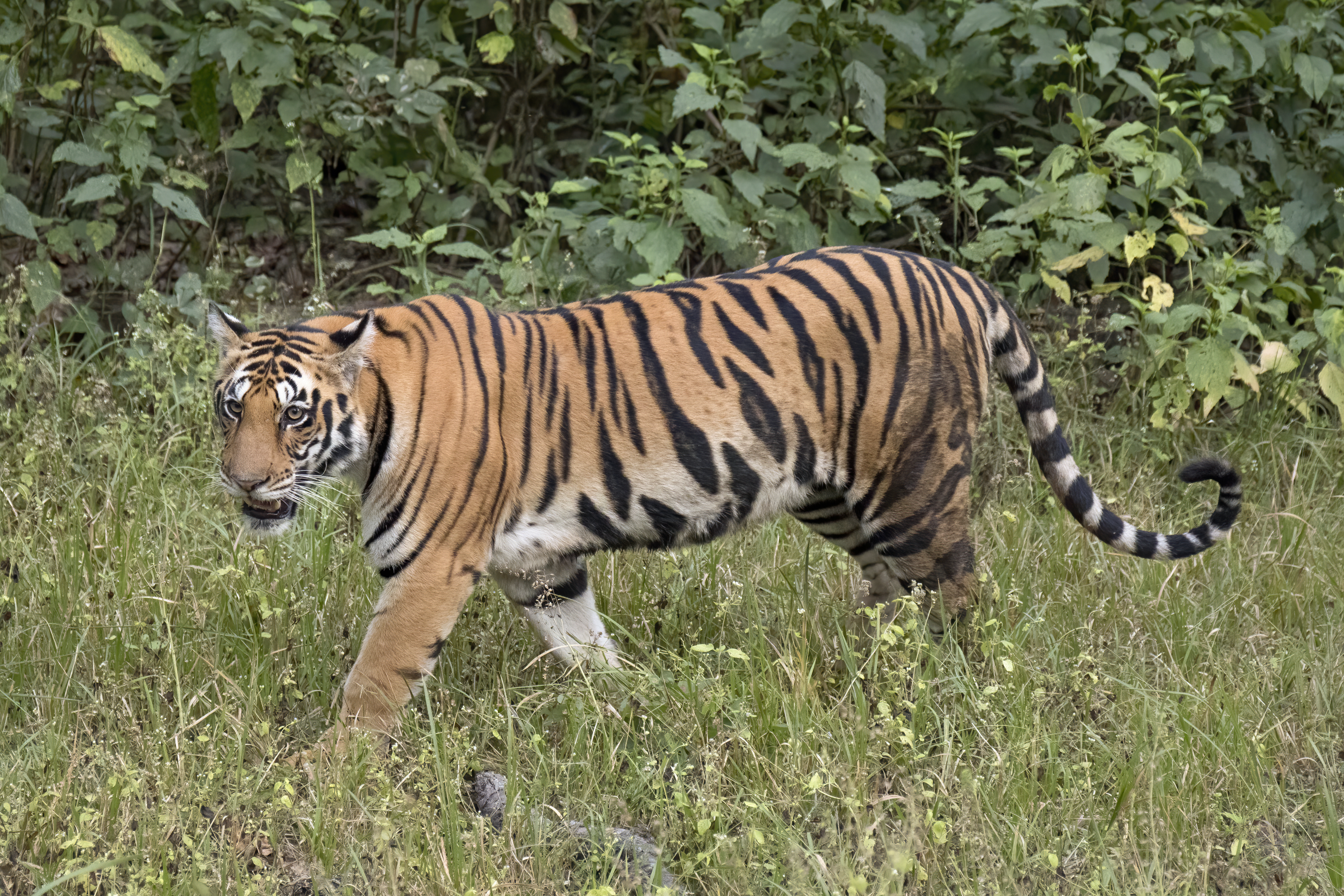
Tigers are the largest living felids.

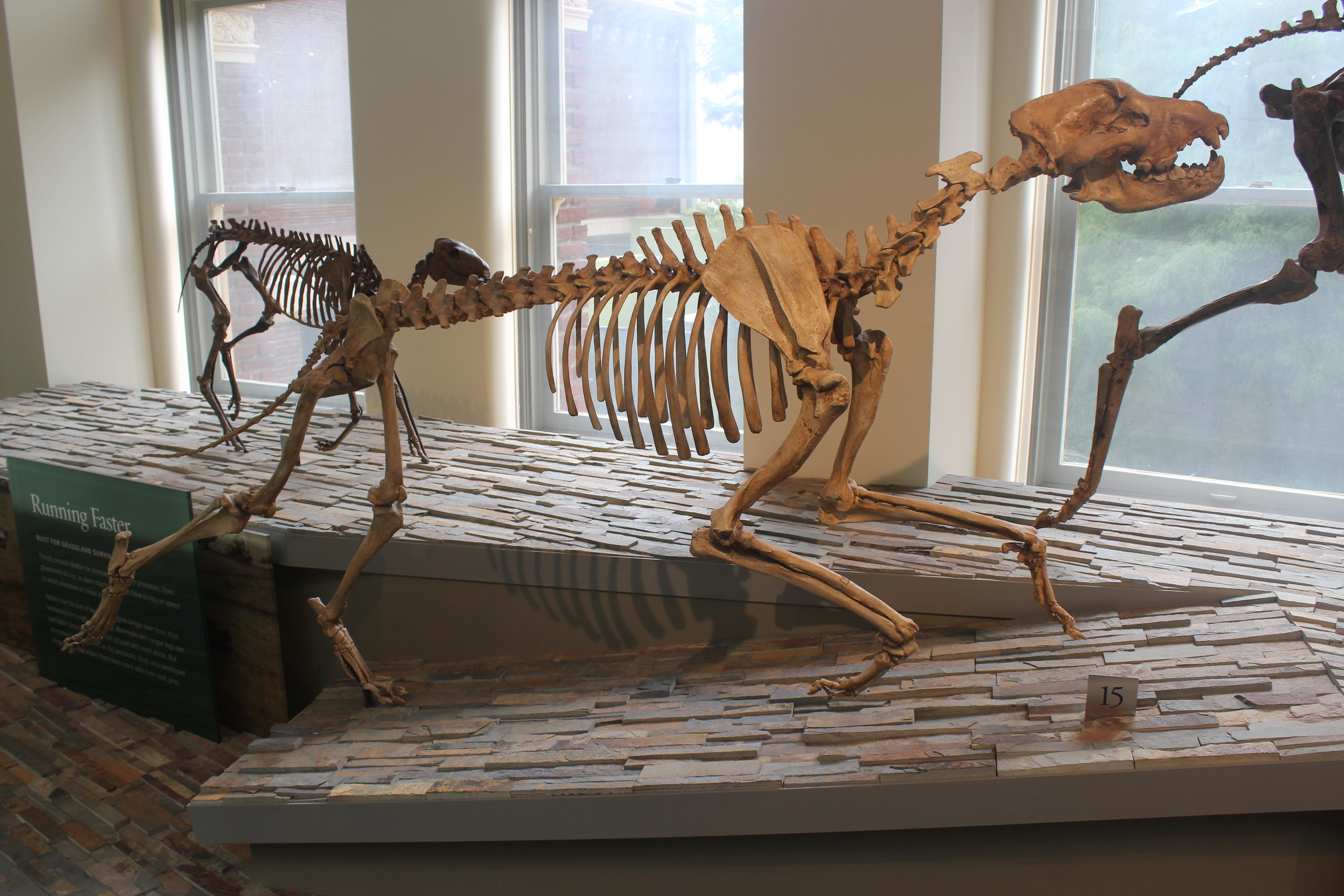
Epicyon haydeni was the largest ever canid.

- The largest carnivoran as well as the largest pinniped is the southern elephant seal (Mirounga leonina), attaining sizes up to 5,000 kg (11,000 lb) in weight and 6.9 m (23 ft) in length.
- The largest living land carnivoran, on average, is the polar bear (Ursus maritimus). It can reach a shoulder height of over 1.6 m (5.2 ft) and total length of as much as 3.1 m (10 ft). The heaviest wild polar bear weight recorded was 1,002 kg (2,209 lb). The Kodiak bear, a brown bear (U. arctos) subspecies, rivals the polar bear in size, but is slightly smaller. It has a similar body length with the largest confirmed wild specimen weighing 751 kg (1,656 lb). The largest bear, and possibly the largest known mammalian land carnivore of all time, was Arctotherium angustidens. The largest specimen yet found is estimated to have weighed up to 1,600 kg (3,500 lb) and to have stood up to 3.39 m (11 ft 1 in) tall on the hind-limbs
- The largest living species of the family Felidae is the tiger (Panthera tigris), with reports of males up to 388.7 and 465 kg (857 and 1,025 lb) in the wilderness and captivity, respectively. (Note: There are issues, such as that the record of 388.7 kg (857 lb) for a wild Bengal tiger was not unanimously accepted as being reliable.) Captive ligers, hybrids between lions (P. leo) and tigers, can grow up to non-obese weights over 410 kg (900 lb).
- Among the largest members of the family Felidae were the extinct American lion, averaging 256 kg (564 lb), the sabertooth Smilodon populator, of which the largest males might have exceeded 400 kg (880 lb), and sabertooths of genus Adeilosmilus (e.g., A. kabir), with an estimated mass of 350–490 kg (770–1,080 lb) and the Ngangdong tiger (Panthera tigris soloensis), estimated to have weighed up to 486 kg (1,071 lb)
- In the wilderness, the largest living member of Canidae is the gray wolf (Canis lupus). The largest specimens from the Northwestern wolf (C. l. occidentalis) or the Eurasian wolf (C. l. lupus) weigh up to 80–86 kg (176–190 lb) and measure up to 2.5 m (8.2 ft) in total length and 0.97 m (3.2 ft) tall at the shoulder. Eurasian wolves from the Russian area have even been reported to weigh as much as 90–96 kg (198–212 lb), though these figures require verification. Domestic dogs however can occasionally grow heavier, up to 155.6 kg (343 lb).
- The largest known canid is an extinct member of subfamily Borophaginae, Epicyon haydeni. The largest known specimen of this species weighed an estimated 170 kg (370 lb).
- The largest and most diverse family of carnivores, the mustelids, reaches their maximum size (by mass) in the sea otter (Enhydra lutris) of the North Pacific coasts, at up to 54 kg (119 lb), and (by length) the giant otter (Pteronura brasiliensis) of the Amazonian rainforests, at up to 2.4 m (7.9 ft) in total. The largest mustelid to ever exist was likely the odd cat-like Ekorus from Africa, about the size of a modern leopard and filling a similar ecological niche before big cats came to the continent. Another contender for largest of this family is the wolverine-like Megalictis, which according to older estimates could have reached the size of a modern black bear. Newer estimates, however, significantly downgrade its size, although, at a maximum weight more than twice that of a wolverine, it is larger than most (if not all) living mustelids.
- The largest species in the mongoose family is the African white-tailed mongoose (Ichneumia albicauda), at up to 6 kg (13 lb) and 1.18 m (3.9 ft) long.
- The largest species in the viverrid family is the Asian binturong (Arctictis binturong), at up to 27 kg (60 lb) and 1.85 m (6.1 ft) long, about half of which is tail. The largest viverrid known to have existed is Viverra leakeyi, which was around the size of a modern wolf or small leopard at 41 kg (90 lb).
- The largest modern species in the hyena family is the spotted hyena (Crocuta crocuta) of sub-Saharan Africa, at up to a maximum weight of 86–90 kg (190–198 lb). Spotted hyenas can range up to 2.13 m (7.0 ft) in total length and 93 cm (37 in) tall at the shoulder. The largest fossil hyena is the lion-sized Pachycrocuta, estimated at 200 kg (440 lb).
- The largest living procyonid is the raccoon (Procyon lotor) of North America, having a body length of 40 to 70 cm (16 to 28 in) and a body weight of 3.5 to 9 kg (8 to 20 lb). The extinct Chapalmalania of South America was the largest known member of this family, about 1.5 metres (4.9 ft) in body length.
- The largest skunk is generally considered the striped skunk, which can weigh up to 6.35 kg (14.0 lb) and reaches lengths of up to 70 cm (2.3 ft). The American hog-nosed skunk (Conepatus leuconotus) is longer, reaching lengths of up to 82.5 cm (2.71 ft), but is usually less heavy, at up to 10 pounds (4.5 kg).

== Bats (Chiroptera) ==
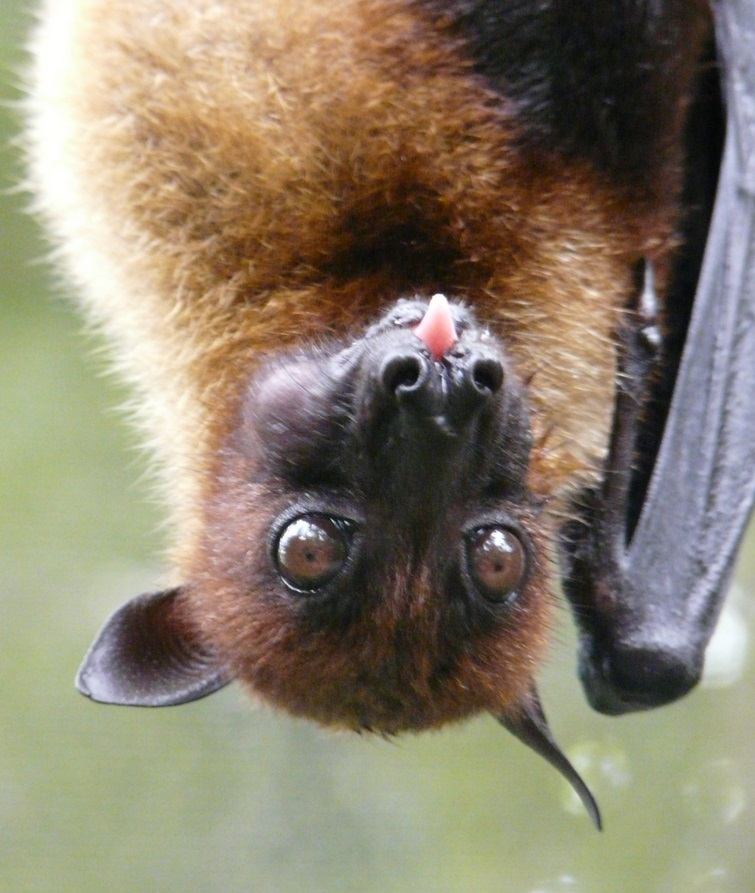
The large flying fox is the largest bat by wingspan.

- The large flying fox (Pteropus vampyrus) is generally reported as the largest bat. Its wingspan has been verified to 1.83 m (6.0 ft) and may possibly reach 2 m (6.6 ft). In weight it is surpassed by the closely related Indian flying fox (P. medius), which is the heaviest bat at up to 1.6 kg (3.5 lb). A few other relatively poorly known species of flying foxes may match these, but few measurements are available.
- The spectral bat (Vampyrum spectrum) of the Neotropics, at up to 95 g (3.4 oz), 14 cm (5.5 in) long and about 0.9 m (3.0 ft) in wingspan, is the largest member of the family Phyllostomidae and is also believed to be the largest member of the microbat suborder.
- The great evening bat (Ia io), at 105 mm (4.1 in) long with an average wingspan of 0.51 m (20 in) and a weight of 58 g (2.0 oz), is the largest vesper bat.

== Armadillos (Cingulata) ==
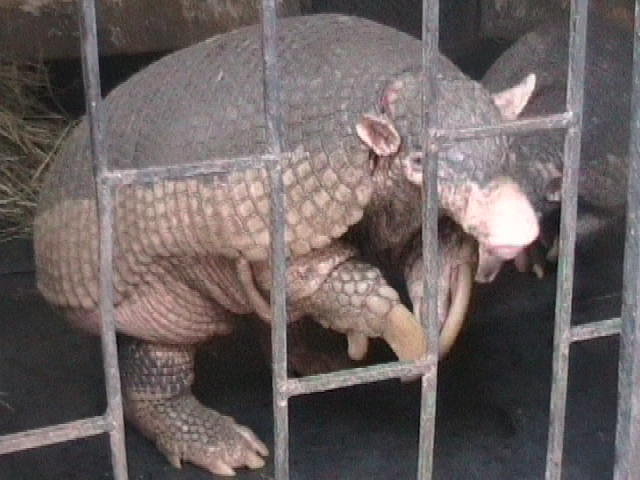
The giant armadillo ranks as the largest extant armadillo in the world.

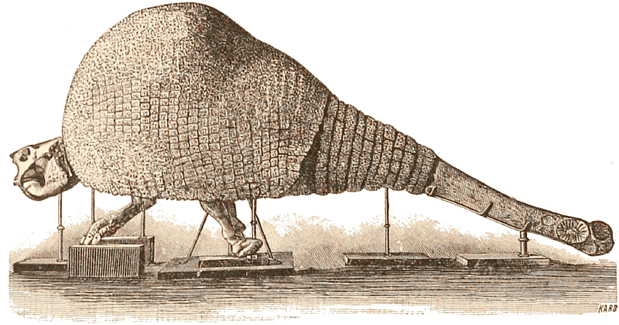
Doedicurus is the largest known armadillo

- The largest of the armadillos is the giant armadillo (P. maximus). The top size for this species is 54 kg (119 lb), 0.55 m (1.8 ft) high at the shoulder and 1.6 m (5.2 ft) in length, although captive specimens can weigh up to 80 kg (180 lb).
- Much larger prehistoric examples are known, especially Doedicurus of South America, which probably averaged around 2 tonnes, though one specimen may have weighed 2.3 tonnes, and could reach 3.6 m (12 ft) in total length and 1.53 m (5.0 ft) high at the top of the shelled back.

== Colugos (Dermoptera) ==
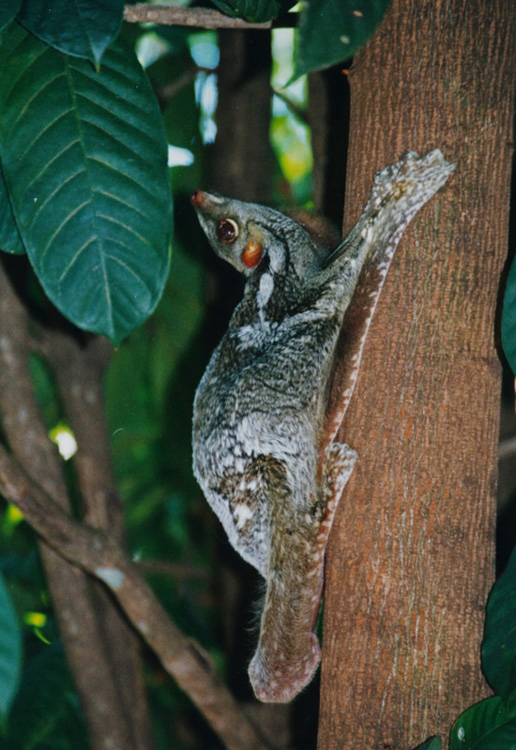
The Sunda flying lemur is the largest Colugo

- Of the two colugo species in the order Dermoptera of gliding arboreal mammals in southeast Asia, the largest and most common is the Sunda flying lemur (Galeopterus variegatus). The maximum size is 2 kg (4.4 lb) and 73 cm (29 in) in length.

== Hedgehogs and gymnures (Erinaceomorpha) ==
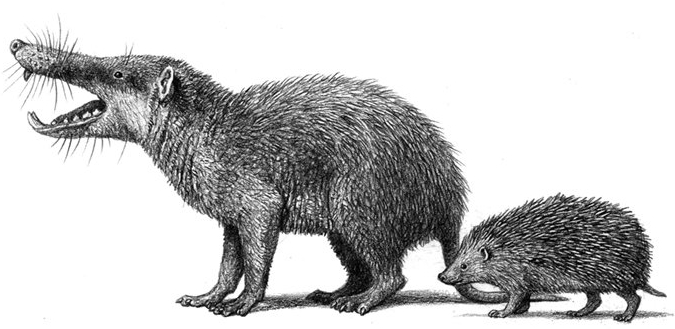
Deinogalerix is the largest known Erinacecomorph

- The largest of this order and family of prickly-skinned, small mammals is the greater moonrat (Echinosorex gymnura), native to the rainforests of the Malaysian Peninsula as well as Sumatra and Borneo. The maximum size of this species is over 2 kg (4.4 lb) and 60 cm (24 in). The moonrat is a member of the same family as hedgehogs, which are typically much smaller than the moonrat. Even larger was the giant gymnure Deinogalerix from Miocene Europe. It was estimated to grow larger than a modern house cat.

== Hyraxes (Hyracoidea) ==
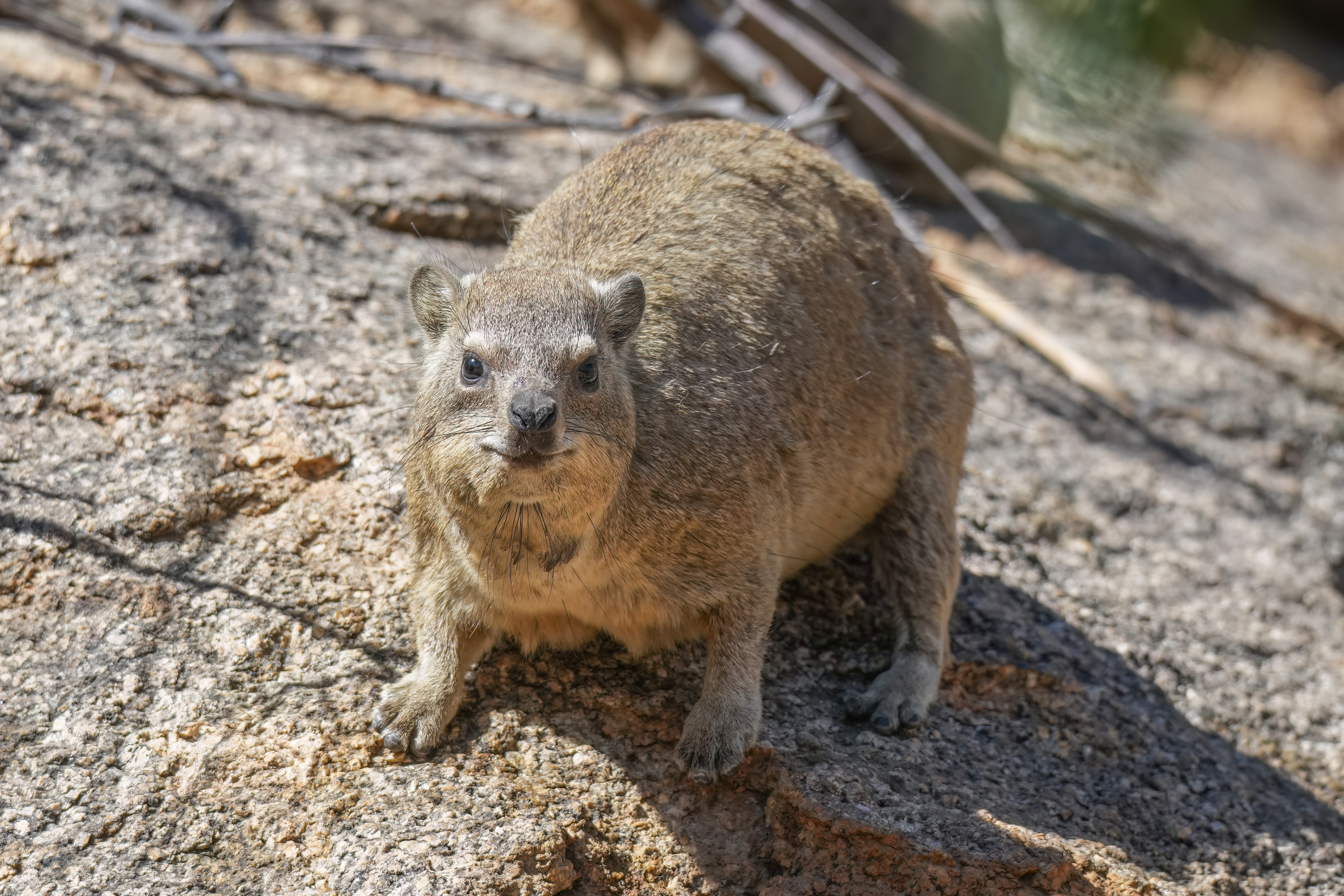
The rock hyrax (Procavia capensis) is the largest living hyrax

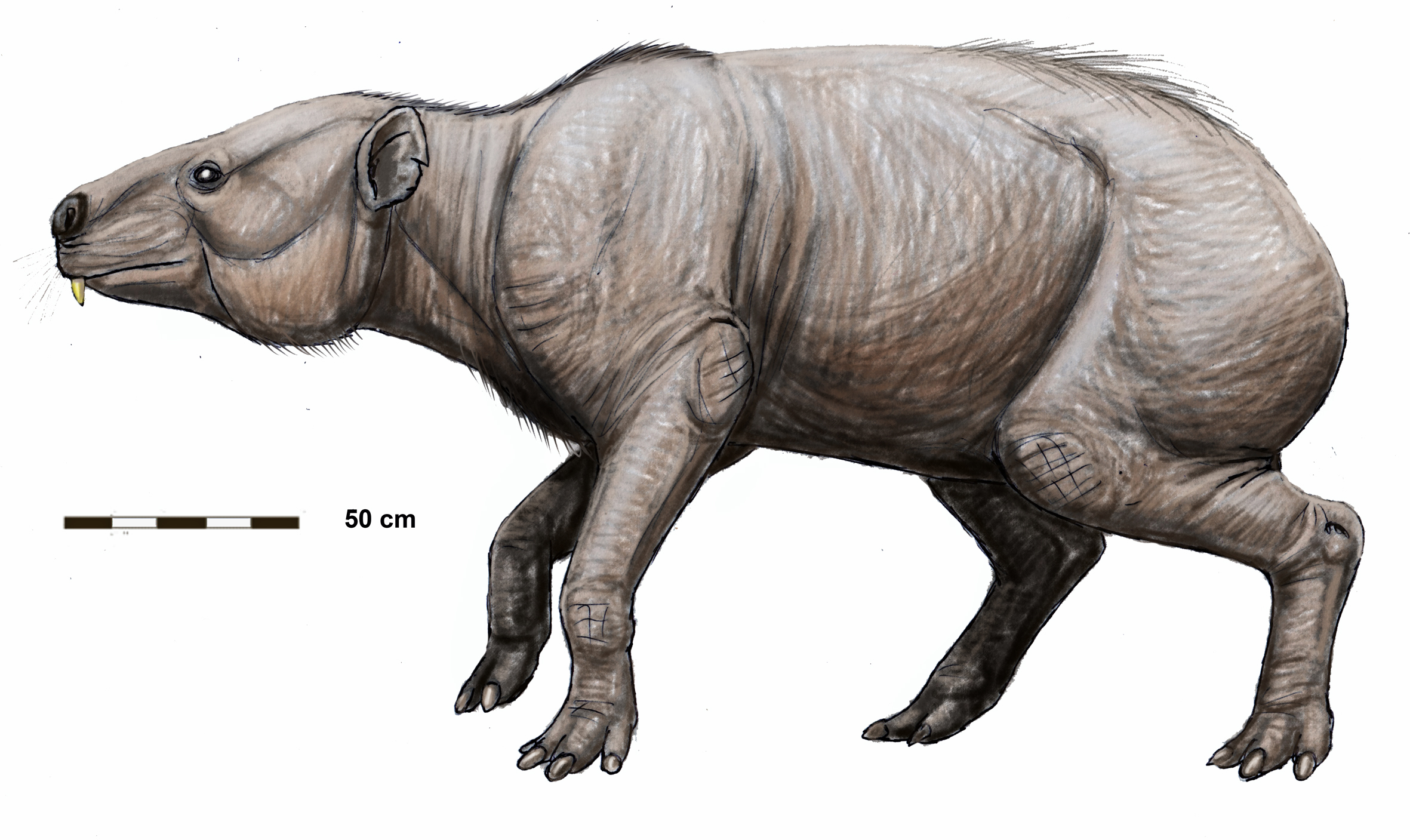
Titanohyrax was one of the largest hyraxes weighing from 600-1300kg

- The largest species of hyrax seems to be the rock hyrax (Procavia capensis), at up to 5.4 kg (12 lb) and 73 cm (29 in) long. Prehistorically, the hyraxes were, for a time, the primary terrestrial herbivores in Africa, and some forms grew as large as modern horses. Genera such as Titanohyrax could reach 600 kg (1,300 lb) or even as much as over 1,300 kg (2,900 lb). With Megalohyrax from the upper Eocene-lower Oligocene reaching the size of a tapir.

== Rabbits, hares, and pikas (Lagomorpha) ==
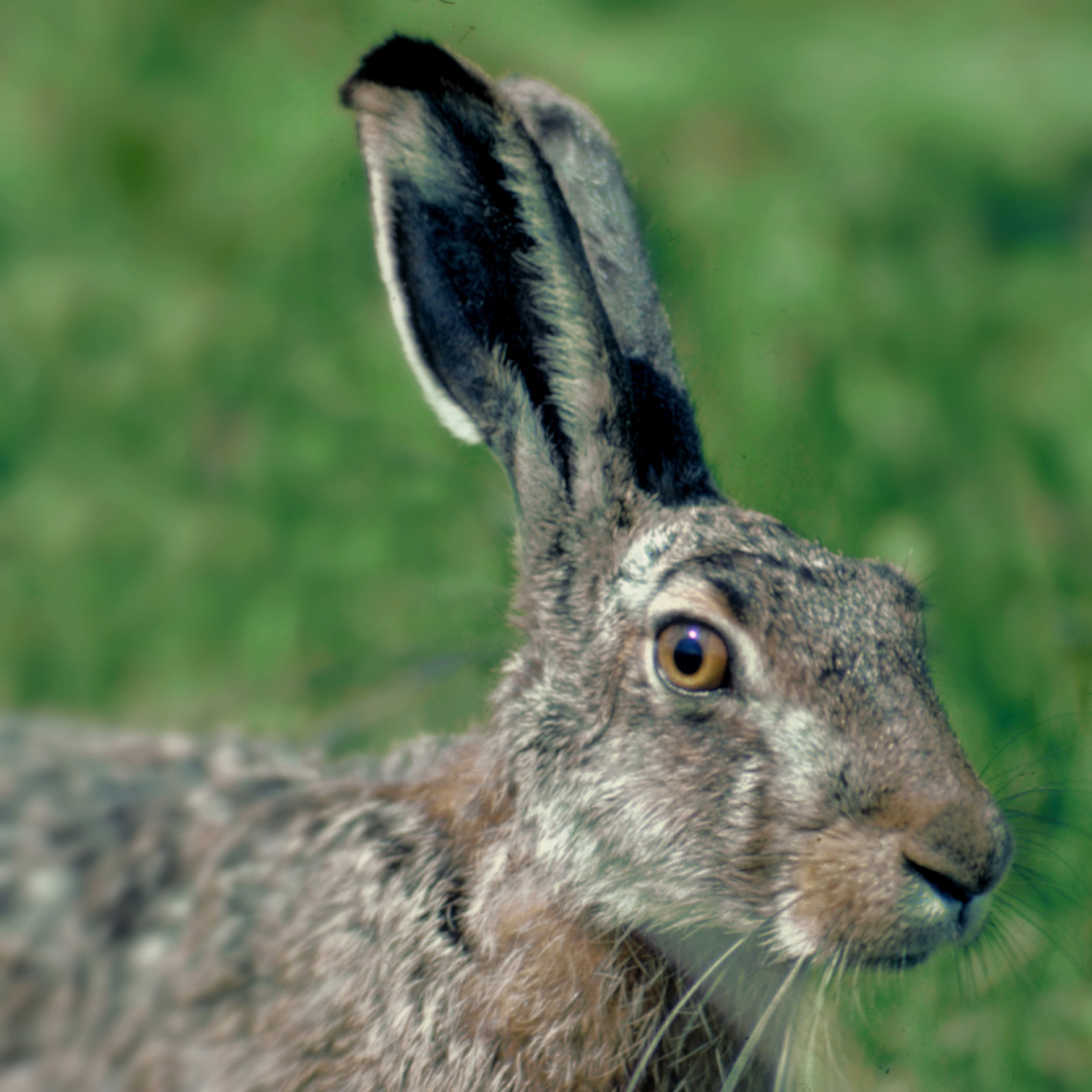
The European hare is one of the largest living lagomorphs.

- The largest extant wild species may be the European hare (Lepus europaeus), native to western and central Eurasia. This lagomorph can range up to 7 kg (15 lb) in weight and 0.85 m (2.8 ft) in total length. However, the Alaskan hare (Lepus othus) has almost the same exact body-proportions and weighs slightly more, averaging 4.8 kg (11 lb) and reaching a maximum mass of 7.2 kg (16 lb). Also, an occasional Arctic hare (L. arcticus) can also weigh as much as 7 kg (15 lb) but is typically smaller overall than the European and Alaskan species.
- The largest pika species, the Chinese red pika (Ochotona erythrotis), reaches a body length of 29 centimetres (11 in).
- The largest domestic rabbit breed is the Flemish Giant, which can attain a maximum known weight of 12.7 kg (28 lb).
- The largest lagomorph ever was Nuralagus rex, native to Menorca, which could have possibly grow anywhere from 8 kg (18 lb) to 23 kg (51 lb).

== Elephant shrews (Macroscelidea) ==
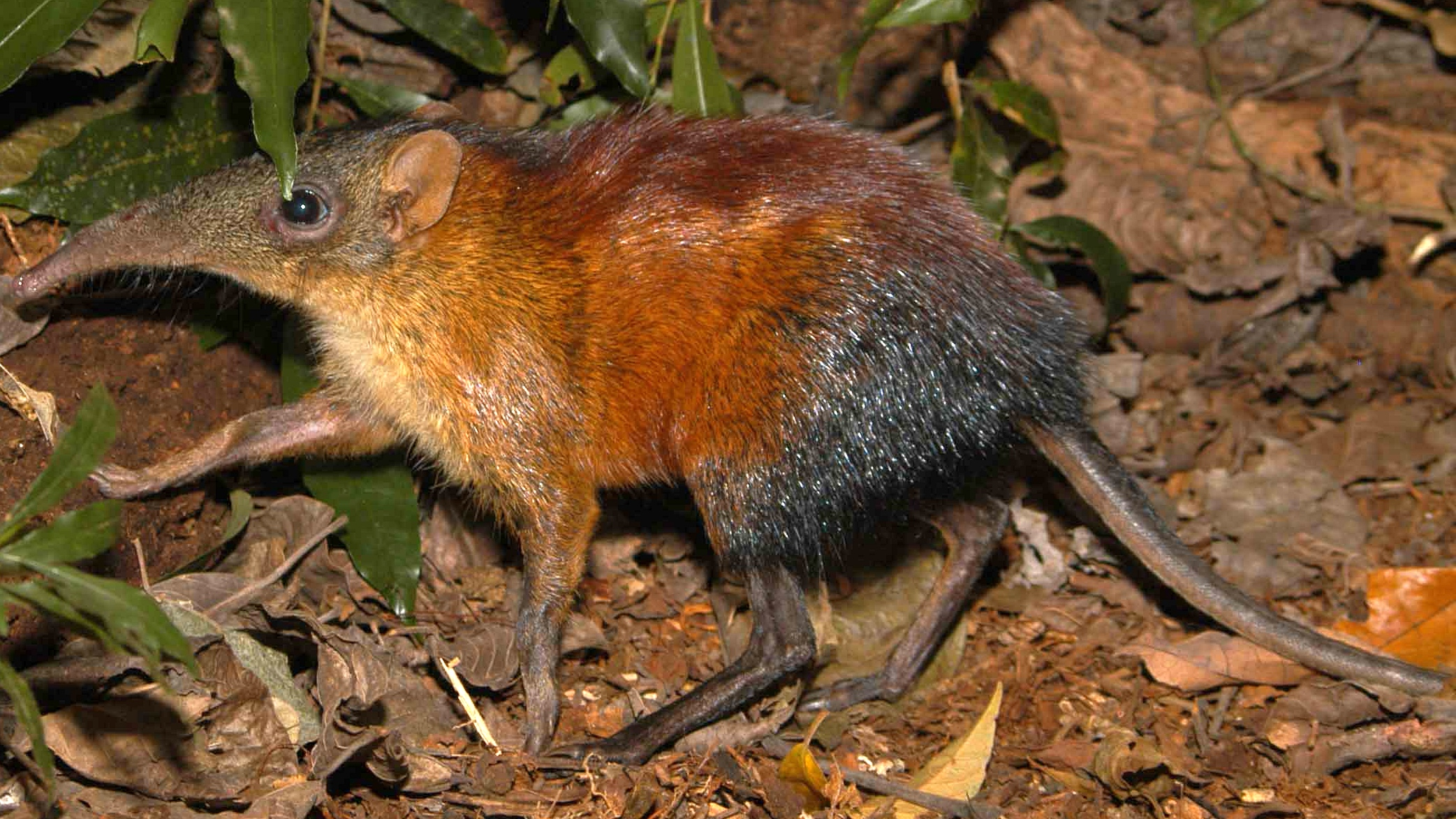
The Grey-faced sengi is the largest elephant shrew

- The elephant shrews are named for their combination of long, trunk-like snouts and long legs combined with a general shrew-like body form, but these animals are in fact not closely related to any other extant order (including treeshrews) and are a unique group behaviorally and in appearance. The largest species is the recently discovered grey-faced sengi (Rhynchocyon udzungwensis), known only from the Udzungwa Mountains of Tanzania and Kenya. This elephant shrew can range up to 0.75 kg (1.7 lb) and a length of 0.6 m (2.0 ft).

== Marsupials (Marsupialia) ==
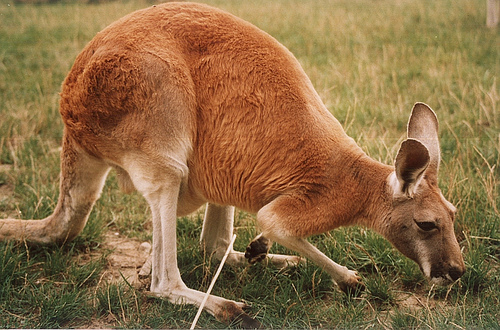
The red kangaroo is the largest living marsupial.

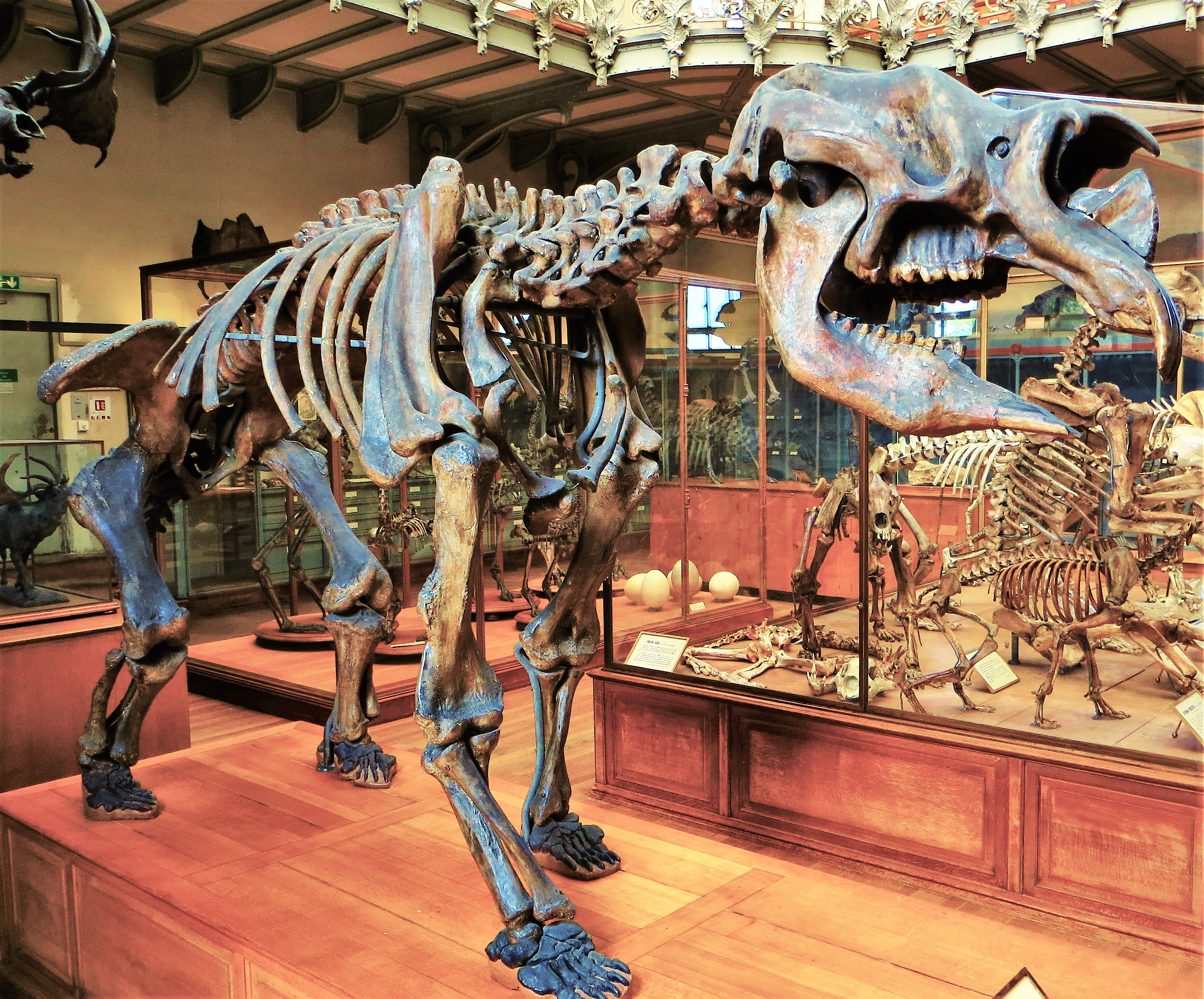
Diprotodon, the largest marsupial of all time

- The largest opossum is the Virginia opossum (Didelphis virginiana) from North America. Virginia opossums can vary considerably in size, with larger specimens found to the north of the opossum's range and smaller specimens in the tropics. They measure 13–37 inches (35–94 cm) long from their snout to the base of the tail, with the tail adding another 8.5–19 inches (21.6–47 cm). Weight for males ranges from 1.7 to 14 pounds (0.8–6.4 kg) and for females from 11 ounces to 8.2 pounds (0.3–3.7 kg).
- The largest possum is the common brushtail possum (Trichosurus vulpecula) from Australia 32–58 cm with a tail length of 24–40 cm. It weighs 1.2-4.5 kg. Males are generally larger than females.
- The largest peramelemorph, the long-nosed bandicoot (Perameles nasuta), reaches a body length of about 40 centimetres (16 in), including a tail of 14 centimetres (5.5 in), and weighs 1.5 kilograms (3.3 lb).
- The red kangaroo (Osphanter rufus) of Australia is the largest living marsupial, and the largest member of the kangaroo family. These lanky mammals have been verified to 91 kg (201 lb) and 2.18 m (7.2 ft) when standing completely upright. Unconfirmed specimens have been reported up to 150 kg (330 lb). Prehistoric kangaroos reached even larger sizes. Procoptodon goliah was one of the largest known kangaroos that ever existed, standing approximately 2 m (6.6 ft) and weighing about 230 kg (510 lb). Some species from the genus Sthenurus were similar in size as well.
- The northern hairy-nosed wombat (Lasiorhinus kreffti) is the largest vombatiform alive today with a head and body length up to 102 cm (40 in) and a weight of up to 40 kg (88 lb). Prehistorically, this suborder contained many huge marsupials, including the largest to ever exist: Diprotodon. This rhino-sized herbivore would have reached more than 3.3 m (11 ft) in length and stood 1.83 m (6.0 ft) at shoulder and was estimated to weigh up to 3,000 kg (6,600 lb).
- The Tasmanian devil (Sarcophilus harrisii), endemic to Tasmania, is the largest living marsupial carnivore. These stocky mammals can range up to 14 kg (31 lb) and 1.1 m (3.6 ft) in total length. The recently extinct thylacine (Thylacinus cynocephalus), a close relative of the devil, grew larger and was the largest member of the group to survive into modern times. The largest measured specimen was 290 cm (9.5 ft) from nose to tail.
- The largest carnivorous marsupials known to ever exist were the Australian marsupial lion (Thylacoleo carnifex) and the South American saber-toothed marsupial (Thylacosmilus) both ranging from 1.5 to 1.8 m (4.9 to 5.9 ft) long and weighing between 100 and 160 kg (220 and 350 lb). Neither were closely related to the true marsupial carnivores of today. Rather, the marsupial lion was most closely related to the herbivorous koalas, while Thylacosmilus was a member of the order Sparassodonta, a group which may not have even been true marsupials.

== Monotremes (Monotremata) ==
The largest extant monotreme (egg-bearing mammal) is the western long-beaked echidna (Zaglossus bruijni) weighing up to 16.5 kg (36 lb) and measuring 1 m (3.3 ft) long. The largest monotreme ever was the extinct echidna species Murrayglossus hacketti, known only from a few bones found in Western Australia. It was about 1 m long and probably weighed about 30 kg (66 lb).

== Odd-toed ungulates (Perissodactyla) ==
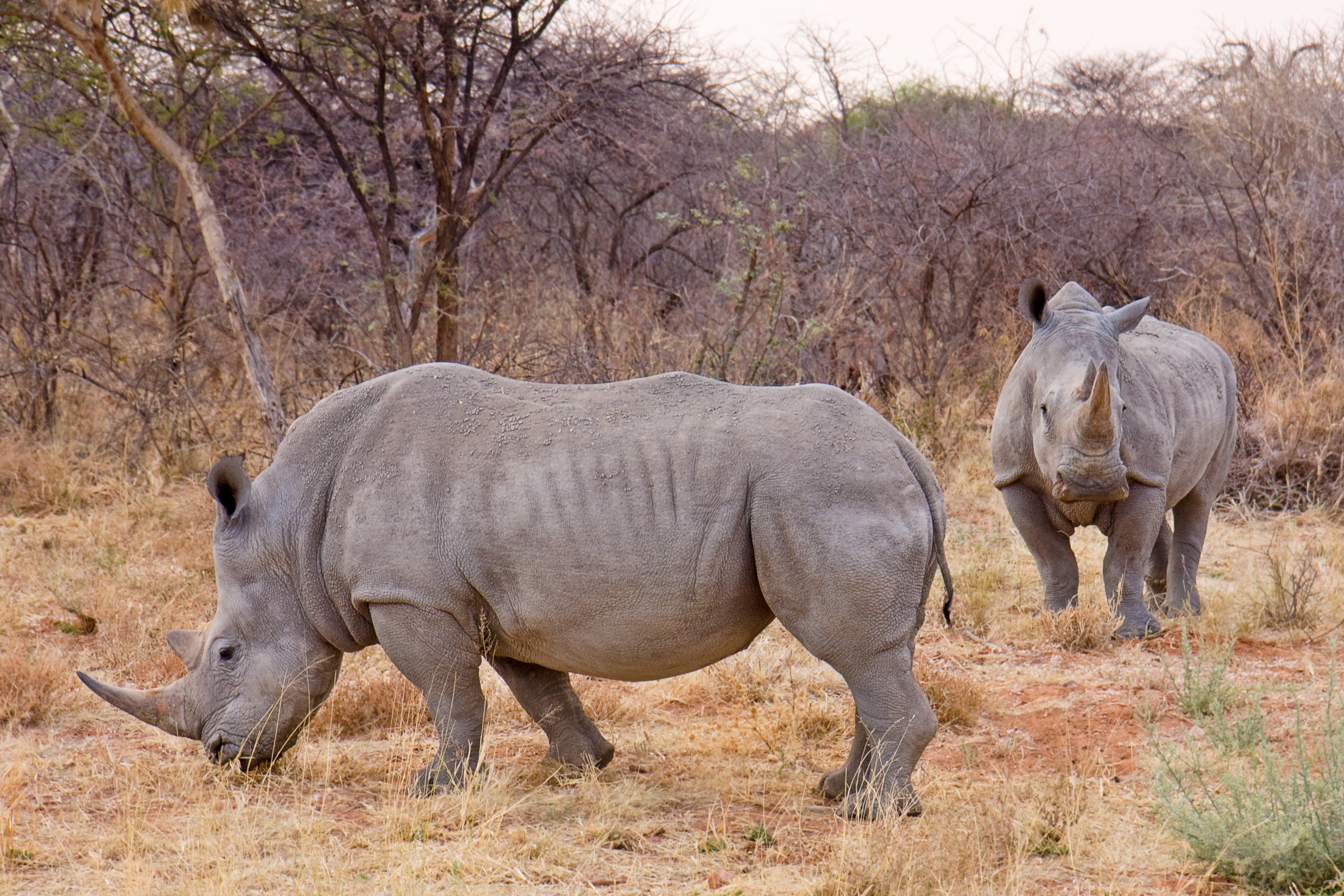
The largest odd-toed ungulate is the white rhinoceros.

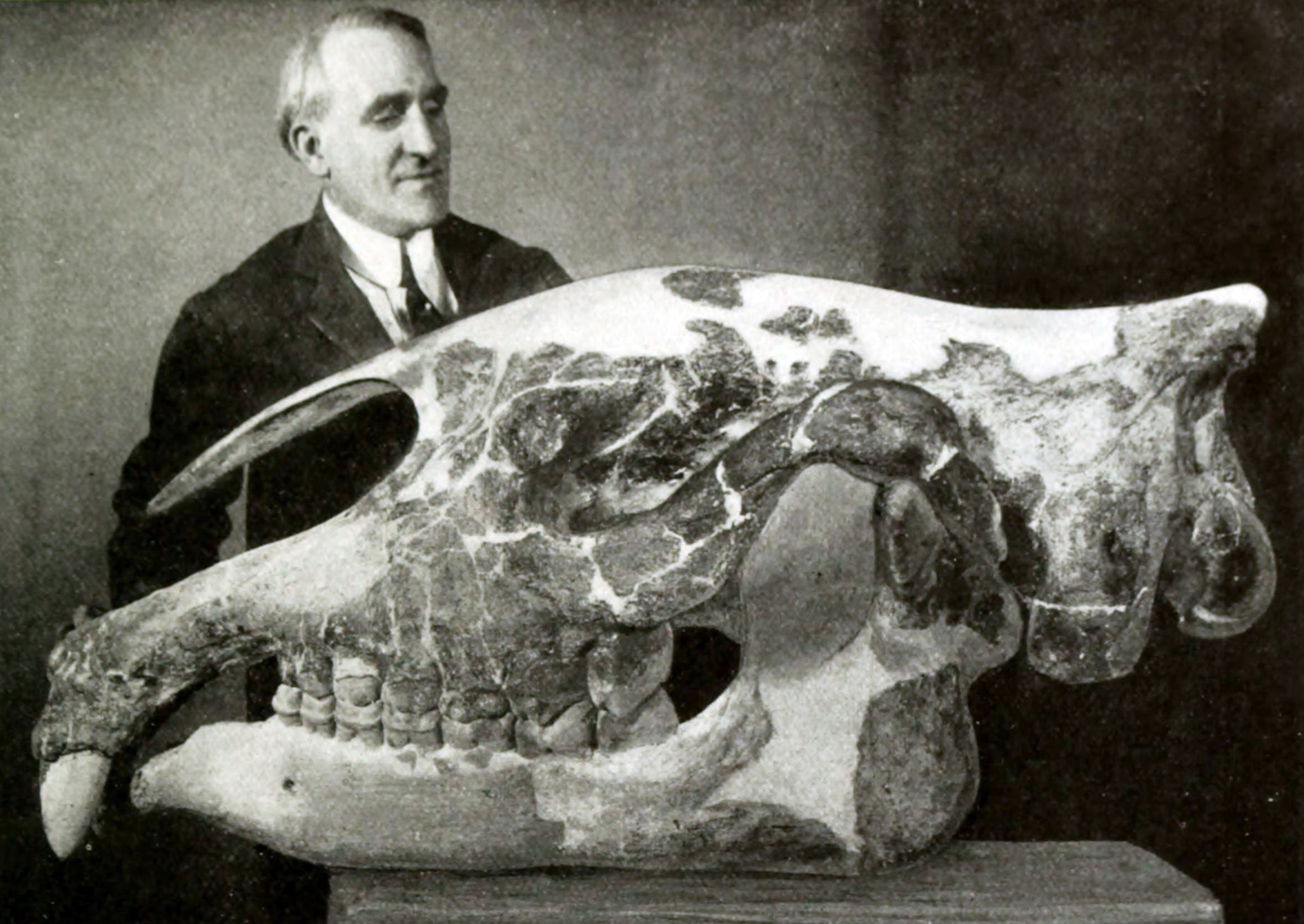
Paraceratherium (skull pictured) was the second largest odd-toed ungulate, and one of the largest land mammals, of all time.

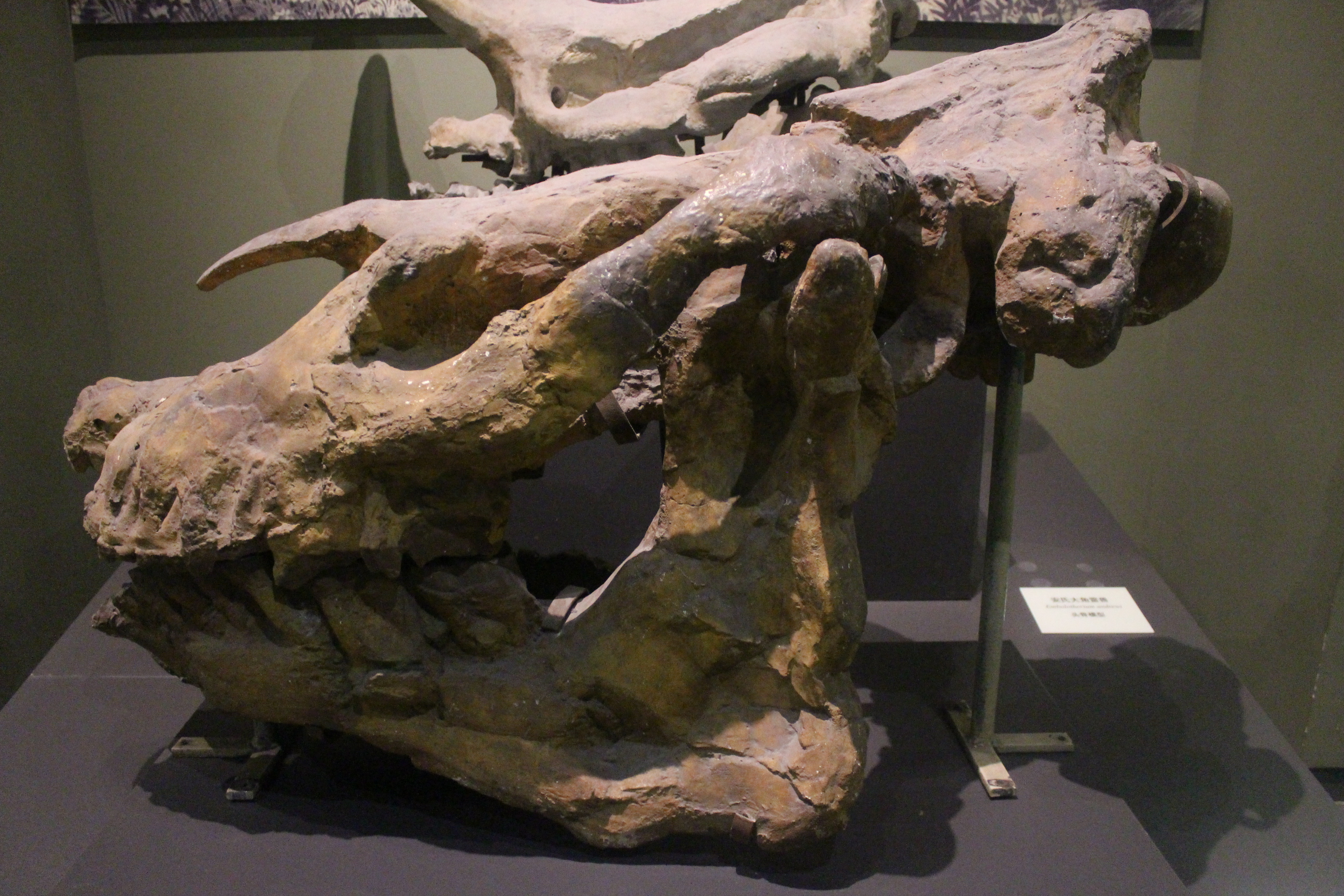
Dzungariotherium was most likely the largest odd-toed ungulate and may be a leading contender alongside Palaeoloxodon namadicus for the title of the largest land mammal.

- The largest extant species is the white rhinoceros (Ceratotherium simum). The largest size this species can attain is 4,500 kg (9,900 lb), 4.7 m (15 ft) in total length, and 1.85 m (6.1 ft) tall at the shoulder. It is slightly larger than the Indian rhinoceros (Rhinoceros unicornis), which can range up to a weight of 4,000 kg (8,800 lb). The extinct Elasmotherium sibricum was the largest rhino to ever exist. It stood approximately 2 m (6.6 ft) tall at the shoulder, up to 5 m (16 ft) long (excluding horn), and weighed from 3,000 to 5,000 kg (6,600 to 11,000 lb).
- The largest extant wild equids are the Grevy's zebra (Equus grevyi), at up to 450 kg (990 lb), a shoulder height of 1.6 m (5.2 ft) and total length of 2.75 m (9.0 ft). Until it was domesticated into extinction the wild horse (E. ferus) was the largest equid. Domestic horses can reach a maximum weight of 1,524 kg (3,360 lb) and shoulder height of 2.2 m (7.2 ft), probably far greater than the sizes attained by the wild horse. The largest prehistoric horse was Equus giganteus of North America. It was estimated to grow around the same size as the aforementioned domestic horse.
- The largest extant tapir is the Malayan tapir (Acrocodia indica), the only member of the family outside of South America. Maximum size is about 2.5 m (8.2 ft) in length, 1.2 m (3.9 ft) tall at the shoulder, and up to 540 kg (1,190 lb) in weight. The largest known tapir is the Giant Tapir (Tapirus augustus) with a 2018 study estimating a body mass of approximately 623 kilograms (1,373 lb).
- The second largest land mammal ever was Paraceratherium, a member of this order. The largest known species (Paraceratherium transouralicum) is believed to have stood up to 4.8 m (15.7 ft) tall at the shoulder, measured over 7.4 m (24.3 ft) long and may have weighed about 17 tonnes. Though an unnamed species of the related Dzungariotherium may have been slightly larger at 20.6 tonnes in weight, making it the largest paraceratheriid and a serious contender for the largest land mammal.

== Pangolins (Pholidota) ==
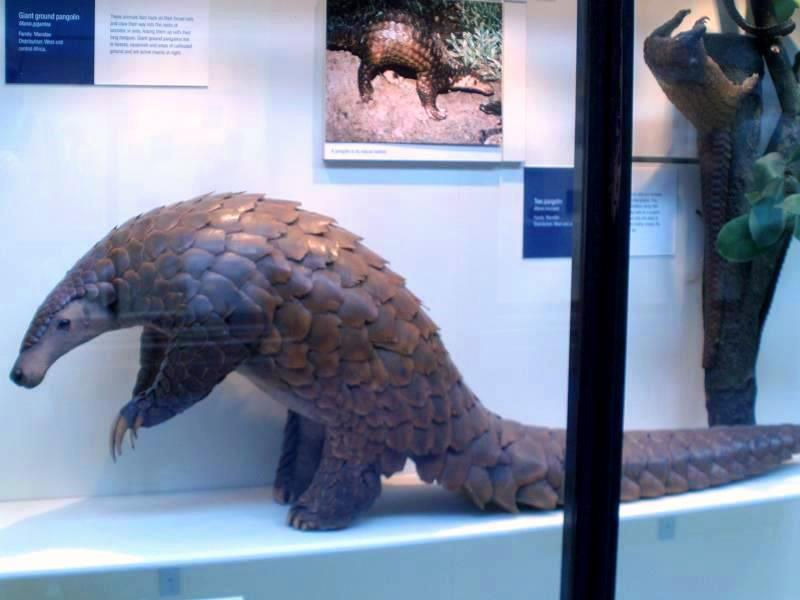
Giant pangolin specimen

- The largest species is the giant pangolin (Manis gigantea), at up to 1.7 m (5.6 ft) and at least 40 kg (88 lb).

== Anteaters and sloths (Pilosa) ==
- The largest species is the giant anteater (Myrmecophaga tridactyla). A large adult can weigh as much as 65 kg (143 lb), be over 0.6 m (2.0 ft) tall at the shoulder and measure 2.4 m (7.9 ft) in overall length.

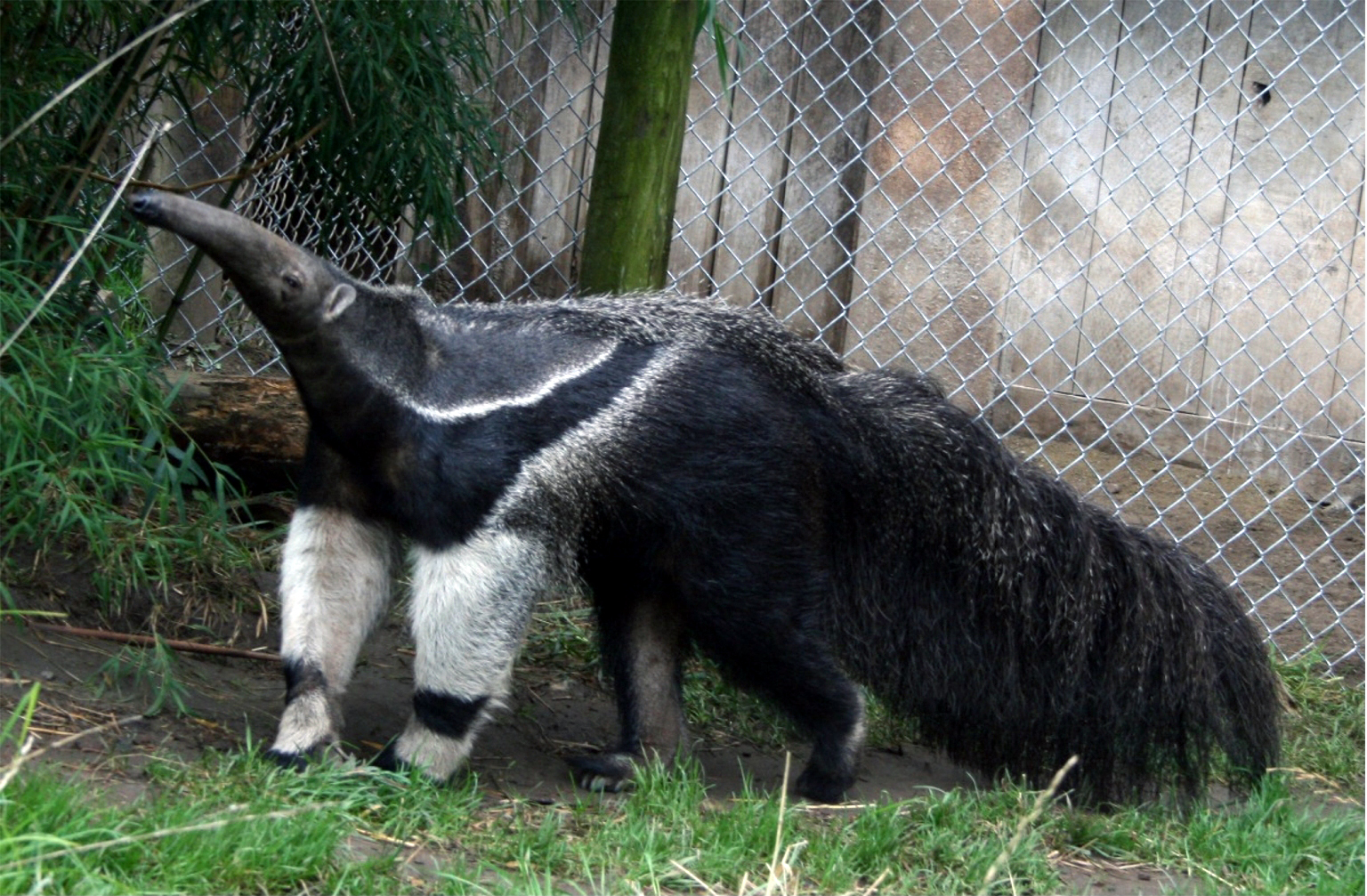
The giant anteater is one of the largest neotropical mammals.

- The largest living sloths are the Linnaeus's two-toed sloth (Choloepus didactylus) and Hoffmann's two-toed sloths (C. hoffmanni), which both can range up to 10 kg (22 lb) and 0.86 m (2.8 ft) long.
- The sloths attained much larger sizes prehistorically, the largest of which were Megatherium which, at an estimated average weight of 4.5 tonnes and standing height of 5.1 m (17 ft), was about the same size as the African bush elephant

== Primates (Primates) ==
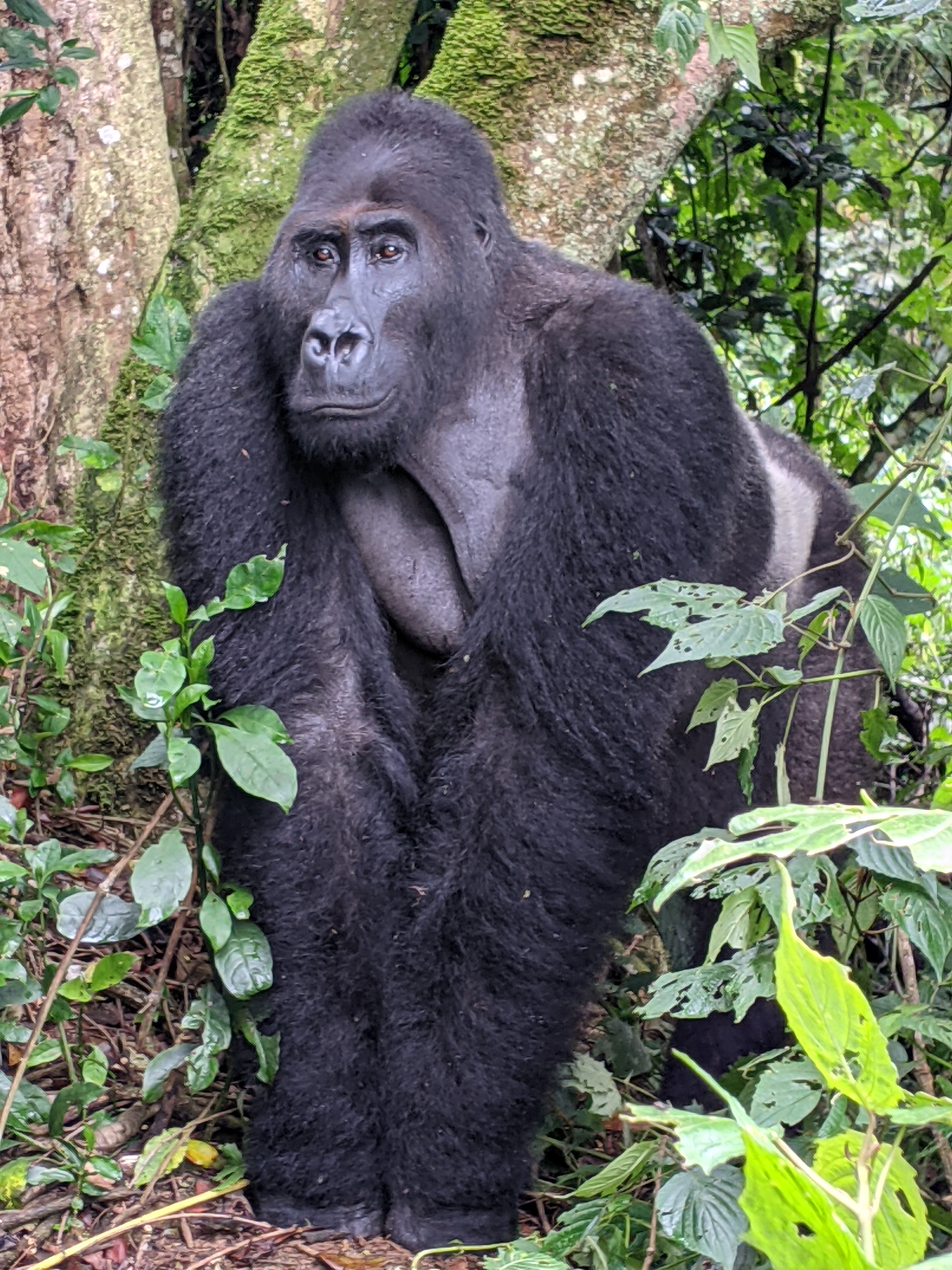
The eastern lowland gorilla is the largest living primate.

- The gorillas (Gorilla gorilla & G. beringei) are the most massive living primates. The largest race is eastern lowland gorilla (G. b. graueri), with males average 140–200 kg (310–440 lb), 1 m (3.3 ft) tall at the shoulder while on all fours and 1.65–1.75 m (5.4–5.7 ft) tall when standing. The tallest wild gorilla (from the mountain gorilla race, G. b. beringei) stood 1.95 m (6.4 ft) and the heaviest wild one massed 267 kg (589 lb), although heavier weights have been observed in captivity. The great apes of the genus Gigantopithecus, which lived in Asia between 1 million and 100,000 years ago, are the largest primates known to have existed. It was estimated to stand 3 m (9.8 ft) tall and to weigh up to 540 kg (1,190 lb). However this is disputed and may only have been half of that weight.
- The largest of the Old World monkeys is the mandrill (Mandrillus sphinx) with large males being up to 50 kg (110 lb), 90 cm (3.0 ft) long and 50 cm (20 in) at the shoulders. The prehistoric baboon Dinopithecus grew even larger than modern mandrills, weighing as much as a grown man.
- The largest New World monkey is the southern muriqui (Brachyteles arachnoides), up to 15 kg (33 lb) and 1.6 m (5.2 ft) in total length.
- The largest lemur is the indri (Indri indri) which can weigh up to 12 kg (26 lb) and 90 cm (3.0 ft) in total length, though one fossil lemur, Archaeoindris, was gorilla-sized at 200 kg (440 lb).
- Humans (Homo sapiens) can attain weights of up to 636 kg (1,402 lb) as well as heights of up to 2.72 m (8.9 ft), although these are cases of morbid obesity, tumor, gigantism or other medical malady. However, even when not afflicted with gigantism, humans are the tallest living primates. The largest man without growth abnormalities was 236 cm (7.74 ft) tall and weighed at least 230 kg (510 lb).

== Elephants and allies (Proboscidea) ==
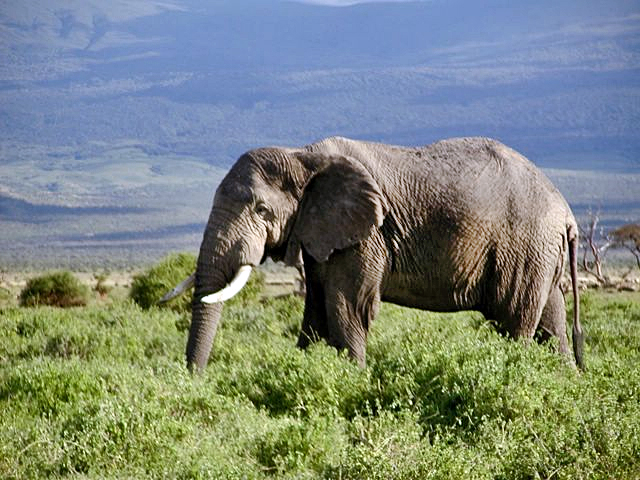
The African bush elephant, the largest living terrestrial animal.

- The African bush elephant, with a largest recorded weight of 10.4 tonnes, is the largest extant member of the order Proboscidea. Though various contenders vie for the title of largest proboscid ever, including the steppe mammoth (M. trogontherii) of Asia, the columbian mammoth (M. columbi) of North America, and Paleoloxodon recki of Africa (each of these species possibly reaching a shoulder height of 4.5 m (14.8 ft) and 14.3 tonnes in weight), the largest so far discovered species is believed to have been Palaeoloxodon namadicus. A recent estimate puts the largest individuals at a shoulder height of 5.2 m (17.1 ft) and a weight of about 22 tonnes. This would make it the largest land mammal known to ever exist, surpassing even Paraceratherium/Indricotherium. Though this estimate is highly speculative and the author of this estimate stated that it should be taken with "a grain of salt" as the material has been missing for nearly 200 years and is either stored in the Indian Museum of Kolkata or is lost. In 2023, a publication by Gregory S. Paul and Larramendi estimated that another specimen identified as cf. P. namadicus, also only known from a partial femur, would have weighed 18–19 tonnes (40,000–42,000 lb). Other authors have noted that weight estimates for proboscideans based on single bones can lead to estimates that are "highly improbable" compared to accurate estimates from complete skeletons.
- Deinotherium "thraceiensis", at 4.01 metres (13.2 ft) tall and a weight of 13.2 tonnes (13.0 long tons; 14.6 short tons), rivaled those proboscideans in size, and was the largest member of its family (Deinotheriidae).

== Rodents (Rodentia) ==
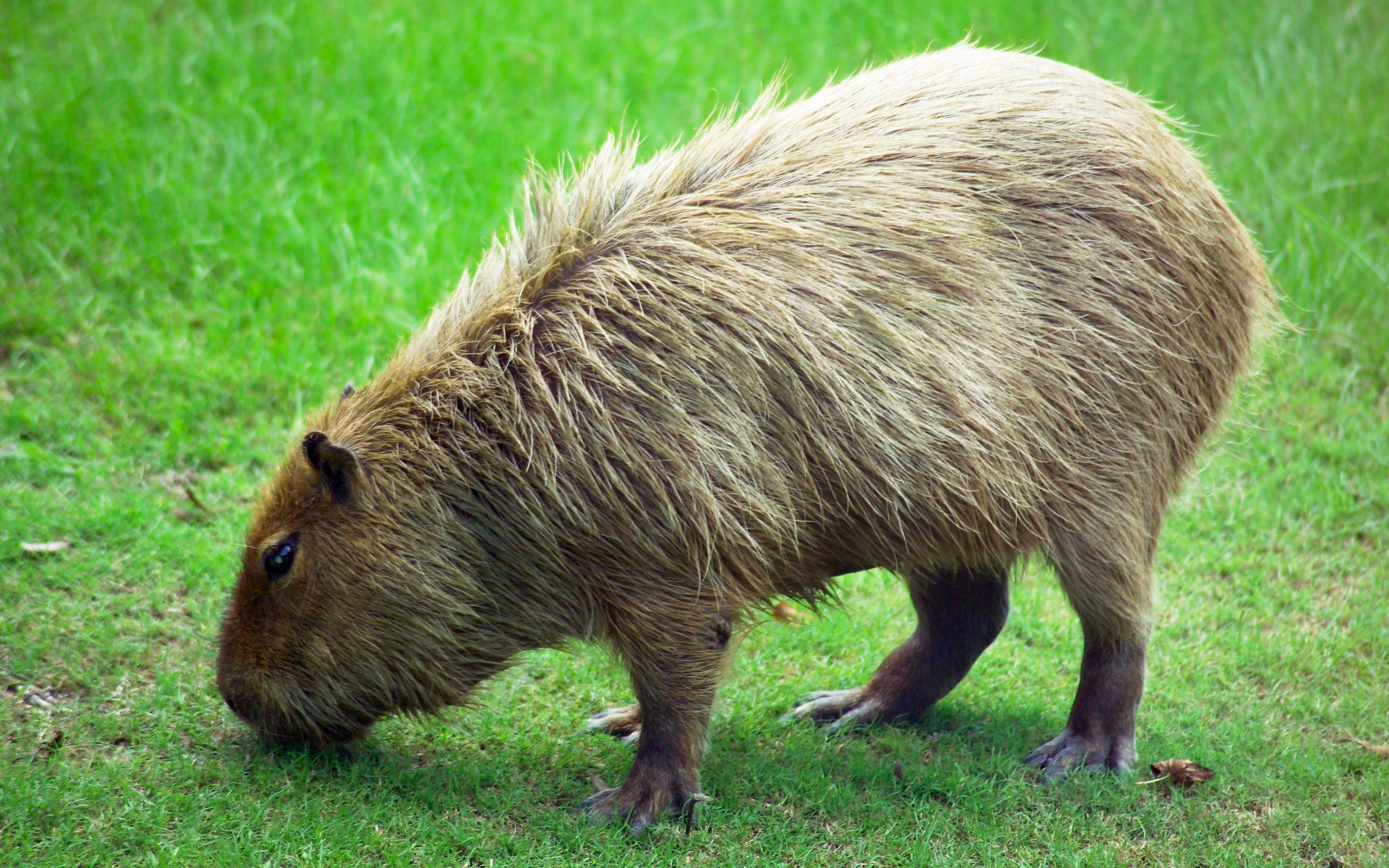
The capybara is the largest living rodent.

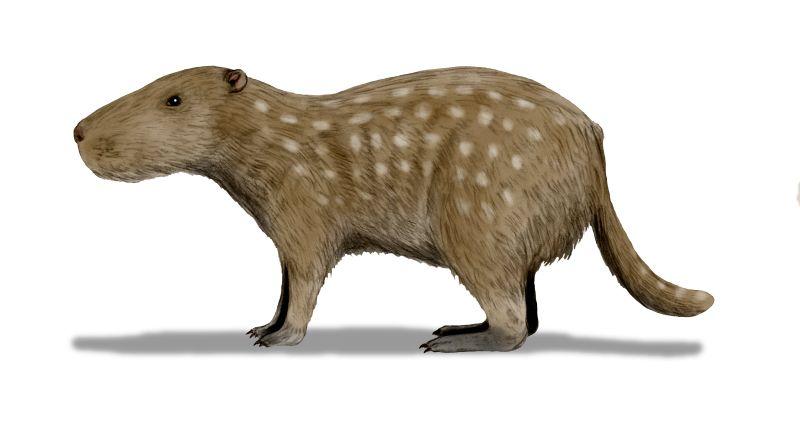
Josephoartigasia monesi was the largest rodent of all time.

- The largest living rodent is the capybara (Hydrochoerus hydrochaeris), native to most of the tropical and temperate parts of South America east of the Andes, always near water. Full-grown capybaras can reach 1.5 m (4.9 ft) long and 0.9 m (3.0 ft) tall at the shoulder and a maximum weight of 105.4 kg (232 lb). The extinct Neochoerus pinckneyi from North America, at 90 to 113 kg (200 to 250 pounds), was 40% larger than the living capybara.
- The second largest living rodent is the North American beaver (Castor canadensis), which favors water perhaps even more than its larger cousin. Outsized male beaver specimens have been recorded up to 50 kg (110 lb), which is about twice the normal weight for a beaver, and 1.7 m (5.6 ft) in total length. The Eurasian beaver (C. fiber) is close to the same average size, but is known to top out around a mass of 31.7 kg (70 lb). The largest of this family is the extinct giant beaver of North America. It grew over 8 ft (2.4 m) in length and weighed roughly 60 to 100 kg (130 to 220 lb), also making it one of the largest rodents to ever exist.
- The largest species in the squirrel family is the hoary marmot (Marmota caligata) of the Pacific Northwest, at up to 13.5 kg (30 lb) and 0.8 m (2.6 ft) long.
- The largest porcupine is the Cape porcupine (Hystrix africaeaustralis) of Central Africa 63 to 81 centimetres (25 to 32 inches) long from the head to the base of the tail, with the tail adding a further 11–20 centimetres (4.3–7.9 inches). They weigh from 10 to 24 kilograms (22 to 53 pounds), with exceptionally large specimens weighing up to 30 kg (66 lb); males and females are not significantly different in size.
- The largest hutia is Desmarest's hutia (Capromys pilorides) of Cuba 31–60 cm (12–24 in), a tail that is 14–29 cm (5.5–11.4 in) long, and weigh 2.8–8.5 kg (6.2–18.7 lb). The largest extinct blunt-toothed giant hutia to have weighed between 50 and 200 kg (110 and 440 lb).
- The largest guinea pig, the greater guinea pig (Cavia magna), grows to a total length of 310 mm (12.2 in) and weight of 636 g (22.4 oz) for males and a total length of 303 mm (11.9 in) and weight of 537 g (18.9 oz) for females.
- The largest muroid is the Gambian pouched rat of Africa. It grows up to 1 m (3.3 ft) in total length and can weigh up to 4 kg (8.8 lb).
- The largest known rodent ever is Josephoartigasia monesi, an extinct species known only from fossils found in Uruguay. It was approximately 3 m (9.8 ft) long and 1.5 m (4.9 ft) tall, and is estimated to have weighed 1.5–2.5 tonnes. Prior to the description of J. monesi, the largest known rodent species were from the genus Phoberomys, of which two species have been discovered. An almost complete skeleton of the slightly smaller Late Miocene species, Phoberomys pattersoni, was discovered in Venezuela in 2000; it was approximately 3 m (9.8 ft) long, with an additional 1.5 m (4.9 ft) tail, and probably weighed around 700 kg (1,500 lb).
- The largest dipodid is the great jerboa (Allactaga major), with a body length of 180 millimetres (7.1 in) and a tail of 260 millimetres (10 in).

== Treeshrews (Scandentia) ==
- The largest of the treeshrews seems to be the common treeshrew (Tupaia glis), at up to 187 g (6.6 oz) and 40 cm (16 in).

== Dugongs and manatees (Sirenia) ==
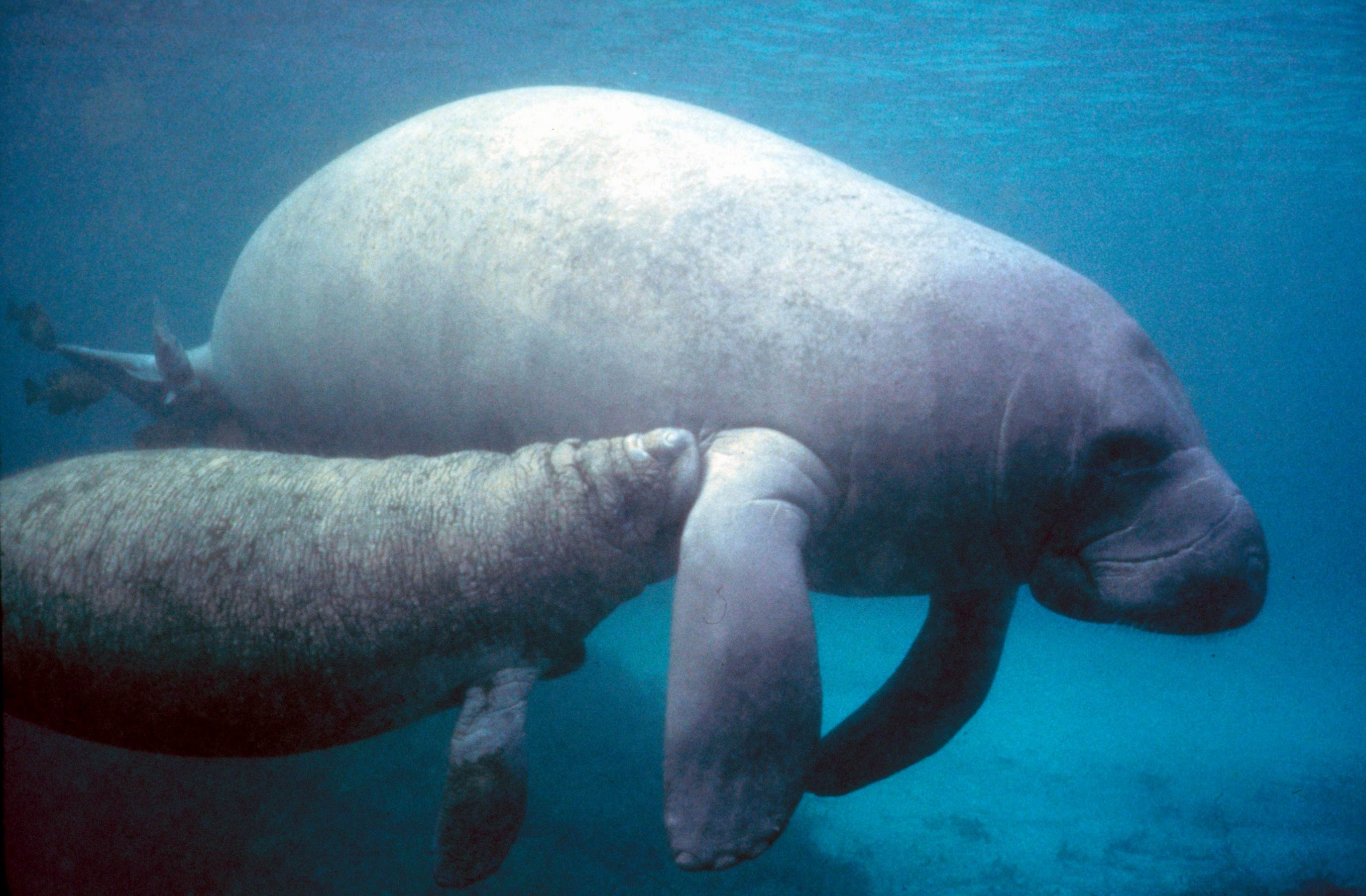
A good-sized West Indian manatee, the largest living sirenian, can weigh well over a ton.

- The largest living species in the order Sirenia of dugongs and manatees is the West Indian manatee (Trichechus manatus). The largest manatees are found in the Florida subspecies. The maximum recorded size of this species was 1,655 kg (3,649 lb) and a total length of 4.6 m (15 ft).
- The extinct Steller's sea cow (Hydrodamalis gigas) was the largest member to ever exist, growing up to at least 7.9 m (26 ft) long and weighing up to 11 tonnes. It was a member of the dugong family.

== Shrews and moles (Soricomorpha) ==
- The largest species of this order is the Hispaniolan solenodon (Solenodon paradoxus), males of which can weigh up to 1 kg (35.3 oz) and reach lengths of 32 cm (13 in).
- The largest species of shrew, typically among the smallest-bodied of mammals, is the Asian house shrew (Suncus murinus), weighing up to 100 g (3.5 oz) and reach lengths of up to 16 cm (6.3 in).
- The largest mole is the amphibious Russian desman (Desmana moschata), with a total length of up to 43 cm (1.41 ft) and an upper weight of 520 g (1.15 lb).

== Aardvark (Tubulidentata) ==
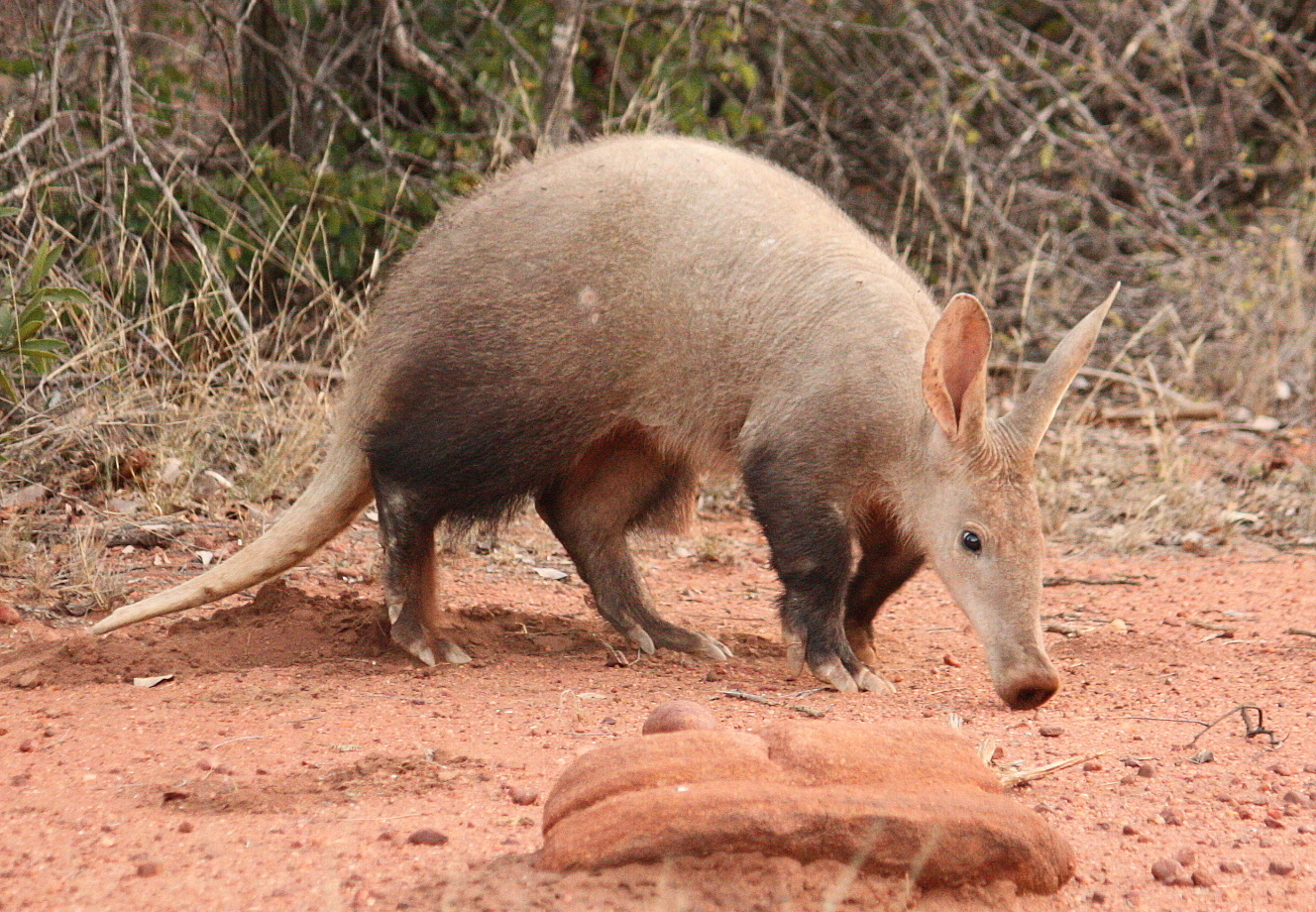
The aardvark is the only extant member of its order

- The only species in this order is the unique aardvark (Orycteropus afer) of sub-Saharan Africa. Aardvarks are typically up to 1.3 m (4.3 ft) in length with an average weight of up to 65 kg (143 lb) and a shoulder height up to 0.65 m (2.1 ft). However, individuals as large as 2.2 m (7.2 ft) and as heavy as 100 kg (220 lb) are recorded.

== Other mammals ==
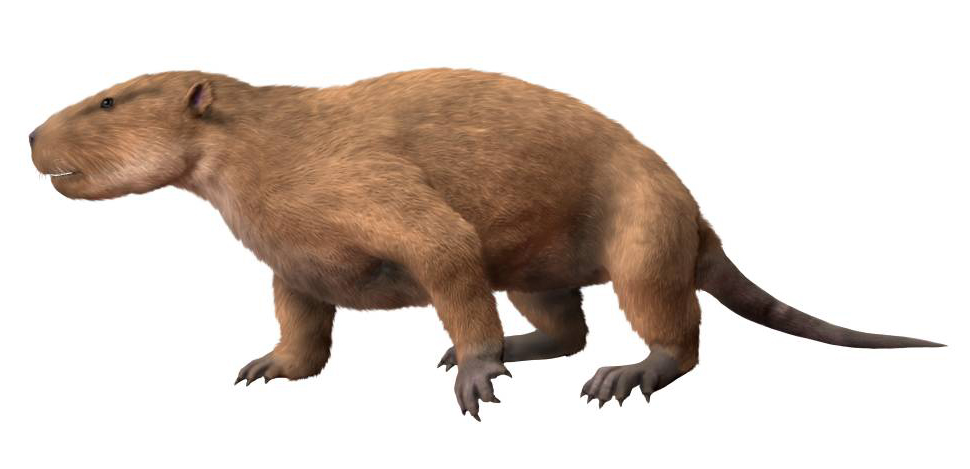
Life reconstruction of Taeniolabis taoensis, the largest non-therian mammal

- An ancient relative of ungulates, Andrewsarchus, may have been the largest carnivorous land mammal ever, despite almost all living species being herbivorous. Known only from a 0.83 m (2.7 ft) skull found in Mongolia, about twice the length of a modern brown bear skull, this great beast has been estimated to range as high in size as 2 m (6.6 ft) at the shoulder and 4.5 m (15 ft) in length. Weight estimates range anywhere from 454 to 1,816 kg (1,000 to 4,000 lb.) based on the unknown proportion of the skull's size relative to the body size.
- The largest member of the extinct order Cimolesta was probably Coryphodon, which was about 1 metre (3.3 ft) at shoulder height and 2.5 metres (8.2 ft) in body length and may have weighed up to 700 kg (1,500 lb) in the largest species.
- The largest member of the extinct order Dinocerata (commonly known as Uintatheres) was Eobasileus. It was about 4 metres (13 ft) long and stood 2.1 metres (6.9 ft) tall at the shoulder, with a weight up to 4000 kg (8818 lbs).
- The largest "creodont" was either Megistotherium or Sarkastodon. Both have had estimated weights of around 800 kg (1,800 lb), though more recent studies suggest they were more likely closer to 500 kg (1,100 lb). Both were among the largest predatory mammals of all time.
- The largest member of the extinct Notoungulata, and the superorder Meridiungulata, was Toxodon. It was about 2.7 m (8 ft 10 in) in body length, with an estimated weight up to 1,415 kg (3,120 lb).
- Taeniolabis taoensis is the largest non-therian mammal known, at a weight possibly exceeding 100 kg.
- Patagomaia chainko is the largest Mesozoic mammal known. With Chimento et al. (2024) estimating it to weigh between 2.6 and 26 kilograms (5.7 and 57.3 lb), with an average estimate of 14 kg (31 lb).

== See also ==
- List of largest land carnivorans
- Largest organisms
- Largest prehistoric animals
- List of largest birds
- List of largest cats
- List of largest fish
- List of largest plants
- List of largest reptiles
- List of largest insects
- List of heaviest land mammals
- Smallest organisms
