= List of heaviest land mammals =

The heaviest land mammal is the African bush elephant, which has a weight of up to 10.1 t (11.1 short tons). It measures 10–13 ft (3–4 m) at the shoulder and consumes around 230 kg (500 lb) of vegetation a day. Its tusks have been known to reach 2.7 m (9 ft) in length, although in modern populations they are most commonly recorded at a length of 0.6–0.9 m (2 ft 0 in – 2 ft 11 in). The average walking speed of an elephant is 7.2 km/h (4.5 mph), but they can run at recorded speeds of up to 24 km/h (15 mph).

== Heaviest extant land mammals ==
Rank	Common name	Image	Family	Taxonomy Classification	Mass (Note: Entries are ordered by the median or mean body mass (in that order of preference), if available, or otherwise by the geometric mean of the body mass range limits.)
1	African bush elephant		Elephantidae	Loxodonta africana	5,200–10,000 kg (11,500–22,000 lb)
2	Asian elephant		Elephantidae	Elephas maximus: E. m. indicus, E. m. maximus, E. m. sumatranus, E. m. borneensis	2,400–8,000 kg (5,300–17,600 lb)
3	African forest elephant		Elephantidae	Loxodonta cyclotis	1,700–6,000 kg (3,700–13,200 lb)
4	White rhinoceros		Rhinocerotidae	Ceratotherium simum: Ceratotherium simum cottoni, C. s. simum	3,000–4,500 kg (6,600–9,900 lb)
5	Hippopotamus		Hippopotamidae	Hippopotamus amphibius: H. a. amphibius, H. a. kiboko, H. a. capensis, H. a. tschadensis, H. a. constrictus	1,210–4,500 kg (2,670–9,920 lb)
6	Indian rhinoceros		Rhinocerotidae	Rhinoceros unicornis	2,070–4,000 kg (4,560–8,820 lb)
7	Black rhinoceros		Rhinocerotidae	Diceros bicornis: D. b. minor, D. b. michaeli, D. b. longipes	850–2,896 kg (1,874–6,385 lb)
8	Javan rhinoceros		Rhinocerotidae	Rhinoceros sondaicus	900–2,300 kg (2,000–5,100 lb)
9	Giraffe		Giraffidae	Giraffa camelopardalis: G. c. camelopardalis, G. c. reticulata, G. c. angolensis, G. c. antiquorum, G. c. tippelskirchi, G. c. rothschildi, G. c. giraffa, G. c. thornicrofti, G. c. peralta	700–2,000 kg (1,500–4,400 lb)
10	Gaur		Bovidae	Bos gaurus: B. g. gaurus, B. g. readei, B. g. hubbacki	440–1,500 kg (970–3,310 lb)
11	Cattle		Bovidae	Bos taurus, Bos indicus, Bos primigenius	120–1,400 kg (260–3,090 lb)
12	American bison		Bovidae	Bison bison: B. b. athabascae, B. b. bison	540–1,270 kg (1,190–2,800 lb) in wild,
13	Wild water buffalo		Bovidae	Bubalus arnee (Note: The domestic water buffalo (Bubalus bubalis) also occurs as feral populations, sometimes in sympatry with Bubalus arnee.)	600–1,200 kg (1,300–2,600 lb)
14	Wild yak		Bovidae	Bos mutus	500–1,200 kg (1,100–2,600 lb)
15	Giant eland		Bovidae	Taurotragus derbianus: T. d. derbianus, T. d. gigas	400–1,200 kg (880–2,650 lb)
16	Water buffalo		Bovidae	Bubalus bubalis	300–1,100 kg (660–2,430 lb)
17	Gayal		Bovidae	Bos frontalis	650–1,000 kg (1,430–2,200 lb)
18	European bison		Bovidae	Bison bonasus	500–1,000 kg (1,100–2,200 lb)
19	Sumatran rhinoceros		Rhinocerotidae	Dicerorhinus sumatrensis	500–1,000 kg (1,100–2,200 lb)
20	Dromedary		Camelidae	Camelus dromedarius	400–1,000 kg (880–2,200 lb)
21	Common eland		Bovidae	Taurotragus oryx: T. o. livingstonii, T. o. oryx, T. o. pattersonianus	400–1,000 kg (880–2,200 lb)
22	Bactrian camel		Camelidae	Camelus bactrianus, Camelus ferus	300–1,000 kg (660–2,200 lb)
23	Yak		Bovidae	Bos grunniens	300–1,000 kg (660–2,200 lb)
24	Polar bear		Ursidae	Ursus maritimus	300–1,000 kg (660–2,200 lb)
25	African buffalo		Bovidae	Syncerus caffer: S. c. caffer, S. c. nanus, S. c. brachyceros, S. c. mathewsi, S. c. aequinoctialis	300–1,000 kg (660–2,200 lb)

== See also ==
- Largest organisms
