= List of largest cats =

This is a list of extant species in the Felidae family, which aims to evaluate their size, ordered by maximum reported weight and length or height, in wild individuals on record. The list does not contain cat hybrids, such as the liger or tigon, nor extinct species such as Panthera fossilis and Smilodon populator, which exceeded living felids in size.

== List ==
Following list contains size (weight and length) measurements for wild adult males of each species:

Rank	Common name	Scientific name	Image	Weight range kg (pounds)	Maximum weight kg (pounds)	Length range (m)	Maximum length (m) (Note: This refers to the length including the tail. Note that lengths given as "between the pegs" generally include the tail.)	Shoulder height (cm)	Native range by continent(s)	Range map
1	Tiger	Panthera tigris		126–221 (277–487)	317 (699) (Verified) 387.8 (854) (Verified)	2.3–3.9	4.0	70–110	Asia	
2	Lion	Panthera leo		160–195 (352–429)	313 (690) (Verified); 360 (793) (unverified) (Note: The largest known lion measured 3.35 m (11 ft). An exceptionally heavy male lion near Mount Kenya weighed 272 kg (600 lb). The longest wild lion reportedly was a male shot near Mucusso National Park in southern Angola.)	2.7–3.5	3.9	90–135	Africa, Asia	
3	Jaguar	Panthera onca		56.1–104.5 (123.6–230.3)	148 (326)	1.8–2.7	2.8	68–80	North and South America	
4	Cougar	Puma concolor		53.1–71 (117–156)	105.2 (231) (Verified) 125.2 (275) (Unverified)	1.5–2.4	2.8	53–88	North and South America	
5	Leopard	Panthera pardus		30–65.8 (66–143)	100 (220)	1.6–2.3	2.75	44–78	Africa, Europe and Asia	
6	Cheetah	Acinonyx jubatus		36.7–54.1 (80–119)	69 (152)	1.5–2.3	2.5	77–94	Africa, Asia	
7	Snow leopard	Panthera uncia		30–39 (66–85)	53.8 (118)	1.6–2.1	2.5	60–66	Asia	
8	Clouded leopard	Neofelis nebulosa(diardi)? (Note: The debate on whether the Sunda clouded leopard is simply a subspecies of the clouded leopard is still ongoing; as such it seems best to keep these two species as the same.)		16–23 (35–50)	26 (57)	1.2–1.6	1.9	46–56	Asia	
9	Eurasian lynx	Lynx lynx		17.4–21.7 (38–47)	45 (99)	0.8–1.3	1.5	60–71	Asia, Europe	
10	Bobcat	Lynx rufus		6.4–18.3 (14–40)	22.2 (49)(Verified) 27 (59)(Unverified)	0.475–1.25	1.30	30–60	North America	
