= List of large carnivores known to prey on humans =

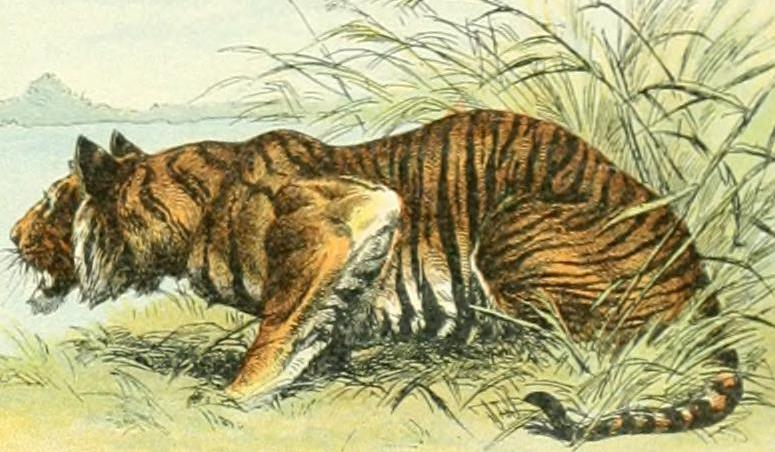
Tiger by Adolphe Philippe Millot (Nouveau Larousse illustré, c. 1900)

This is a list of large carnivores known to prey on humans. This list does not include animal attacks on humans by domesticated species (dogs), or animals held in zoos, aquaria, circuses, private homes, or other non-natural settings. To prey on means "to seize and eat (something) as prey". Synonyms include stalk, chase, hunt, pursue, and destroy.

Statistically, attacks on humans by wild carnivores are an extremely rare cause of death—even in regions with high levels of human-wildlife interaction and relatively high absolute numbers of attacks.

Documented carnivore attacks on humans appear to be increasing in frequency for a variety of reasons, including human population growth, animal habitat loss, and declining populations of traditional prey species.

== List ==
Animal common name	Animal scientific name	Location of fatal attacks	Article
American alligator	Alligator mississippiensis	United States	Alligator attack
American black bear	Ursus americanus	Canada, United States	Bear attack
American crocodile	Crocodylus acutus	Costa Rica, Honduras, Jamaica, Mexico, Nicaragua, Panama	Crocodile attack
Asian black bear	Ursus thibetanus	Japan	Bear attack
Black caiman	Melanosuchus niger	Bolivia, Brazil, Guyana, Peru	Crocodile attack
Blue shark	Prionace glauca	Australia, India (Andaman and Nicobar Islands), United States (American Samoa),	Shark attack
Brown bear	Ursus arctos	Italy, Canada, China, Japan, Kazakhstan, Kyrgyzstan, Mongolia, Norway, Romania, Russia, Sweden, United States, Yugoslavia	Bear attack
Bull shark	Carcharhinus leucas	Australia, Brazil, France (Réunion), Tanzania, Iran, Papua New Guinea, Seychelles, South Africa, United States,	Shark attack
Chimpanzee	Pan troglodytes	Tanzania	Chimpanzee attack
Copper shark	Carcharhinus brachyurus	Australia,	Shark attack
Cougar	Puma concolor	Canada, Chile, United States	Cougar attack
Coyote (Note: As of 2023, there have been two documented fatalities from coyotes.)	Canis latrans	Canada, United States	Coyote attack
Crowned Eagle	Stephanoaetus coronatus	South Africa	
Dingo (Note: Dingo attacks are rare and when they occur, they generally are on children. For example, a dingo was responsible for the death of Azaria Chamberlain, a nine-week-old baby girl. The incident generated significant controversy as Azaria’s mother was incorrectly implicated in her death and later exonerated.)	Canis dingo	Australia	Dingo attack
Dusky shark	Carcharhinus obscurus	Australia,	Shark attack
False gharial	Tomistoma schlegelii	Indonesia	Crocodile attack
Golden jackal	Canis aureus	India	
Goonch catfish	Bagarius yarrelli	India	Kali River goonch attacks
Great white shark	Carcharodon carcharias	Australia, Croatia, Greece, Italy, Japan, Malta, Mexico, New Zealand, South Africa, Tunisia, United States,	Shark attack
Grey reef shark	Carcharhinus amblyrhynchos	South Korea,	Shark attack
Grey wolf (Note: Per Löe-Röskaft, most wolf fatalities are due to rabies transmission.)	Canis lupus	Afghanistan, Canada, China, Estonia, France, India, Iran, Italy, Latvia, Lithuania, Poland, Russia, Slovakia, Spain, United States	Wolf attack
Jaguar	Panthera onca	Brazil	
Komodo dragon	Varanus komodoensis	Indonesia	
Leopard	Panthera pardus	India, Nepal, South Africa, Uganda	Leopard attack
Leopard seal (Note: Only one human fatality caused by a leopard seal has been documented to date.)	Hydrurga leptonyx	Antarctica	
Lion	Panthera leo	Tanzania, Zambia	Lion attack
Morelet's crocodile	Crocodylus moreletii	Belize, Guatemala, Mexico	Crocodile attack
Mugger crocodile	Crocodylus palustris	India, Iran, Nepal, Pakistan, Sri Lanka	Crocodile attack
Nile crocodile	Crocodylus niloticus	Angola, Botswana, Cameroon, Central African Republic, Democratic Republic of the Congo, Eswatini, Ethiopia, Kenya, Madagascar, Malawi, Mozambique, Namibia, Rwanda, Somalia, South Africa, South Sudan, Sudan, Tanzania, Uganda, Zambia, Zimbabwe	Crocodile attack
Oceanic whitetip shark	Carcharhinus longimanus	Egypt, United States (Virgin Islands),	Shark attack
Polar bear	Ursus maritimus	Canada, Norway, United States	Bear attack
Reticulated python	Malayopython reticulatus	Indonesia	
Saltwater crocodile	Crocodylus porosus	Australia, Bangladesh, Brunei, India, Indonesia, Malaysia, Myanmar, Papua New Guinea, Philippines, Solomon Islands, Sri Lanka, Timor-Leste	Crocodile attack
Shortfin mako shark	Isurus oxyrinchus	Fiji,	Shark attack
Sloth bear	Melursis ursinus	India	Bear attack
Southern African rock python	Python natalensis	South Africa	
Spectacled caiman	Caiman crocodilus	Colombia	Crocodile attack
Spotted hyena	Crocuta crocuta	Uganda	
Striped hyena	Hyena hyena	India	
Tiger	Panthera tigris	India, Nepal	Tiger attack
Tiger shark	Galeocerdo cuvier	Australia, Bahamas, Brazil, China, Costa Rica, Cuba, Djibouti, Egypt, France (New Caledonia, Réunion, Saint-Martin), Indonesia, Mexico, Papua New Guinea, South Africa, Tonga, United Kingdom (British Indian Ocean Territory), United States (American Samoa, Hawaii),	Shark attack
Wels catfish	Silurus glanis	Romania	Kali River goonch attacks
West African crocodile	Crocodylus suchus	Burkina Faso, Chad, Guinea, Guinea-Bissau, Mali	Crocodile attack

== See also ==
- List of largest land carnivorans
- List of deadliest animals to humans
- Largest wild canids
- List of largest cats
- Man-eating animal
- List of dangerous snakes
