= List of animals deadliest to humans =

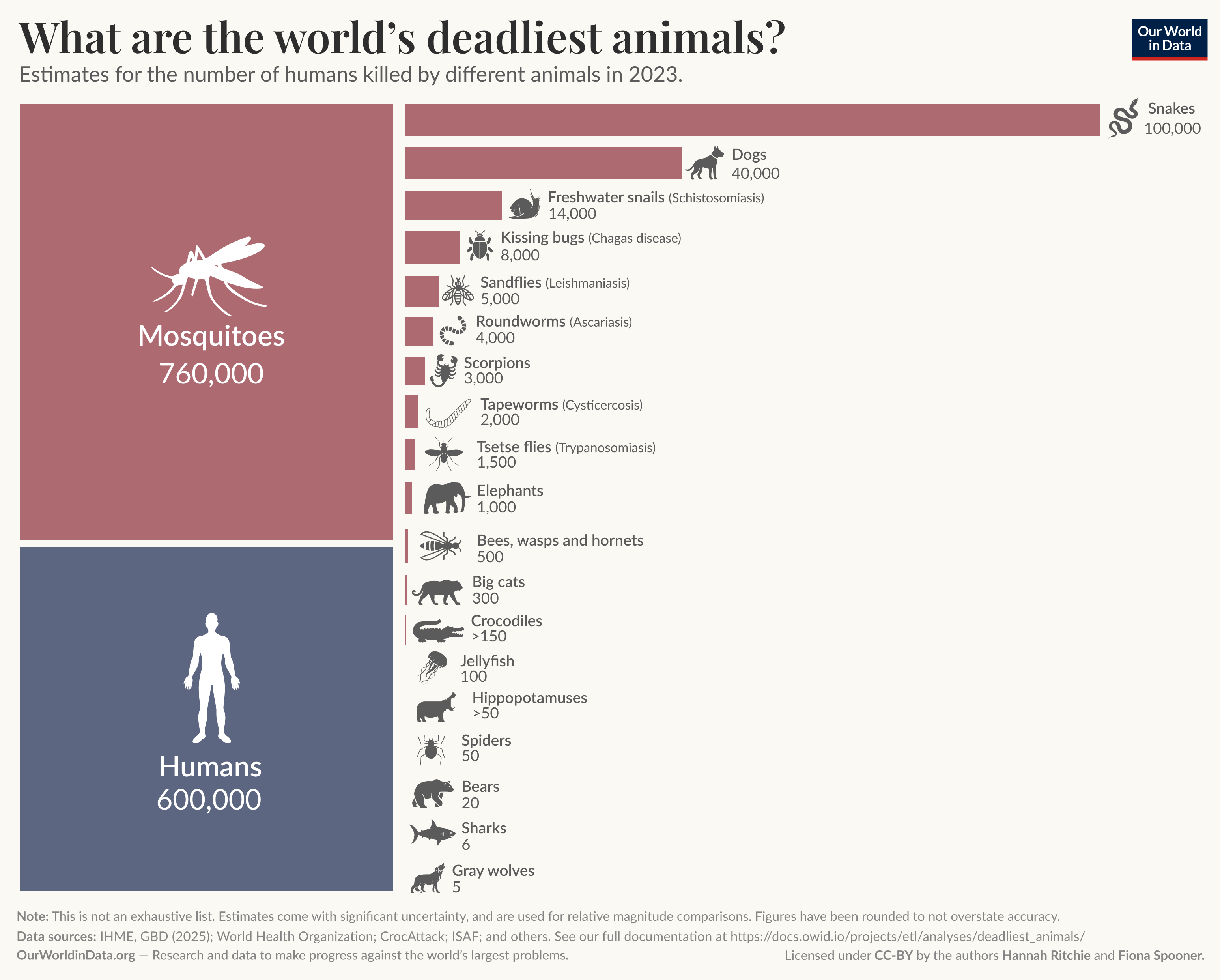
Deadliest animals as of 2023

This is a list of the deadliest animals to humans worldwide, measured by the number of humans killed per year. Different lists have varying criteria and definitions, so lists from different sources disagree and can be contentious. This article contains a compilation of lists from several reliable sources.

Humans killed per year, according to different sources
Animal	Source			
Animal	CNET	Business Insider	BBC News	Discover Wildlife
Mosquitoes (Note: Mosquitoes do not kill humans directly. Rather, they are a vector that transmits mosquito-borne diseases.)	1,000,000	750,000	725,000	725,000–1,000,000
Human beings (homicide)	475,000	437,000		431,000
Snakes	50,000	100,000	50,000	138,000
Dogs (Note: Dogs seldom kill humans directly. Rather, they are primarily a vector that transmits rabies.)	25,000	35,000	25,000	
Freshwater snails (Note: Freshwater snails do not kill humans directly. Rather, they are a vector that transmits a variety of tropical diseases.)	10,000	20,000+		200,000
Assassin bugs (Note: Assassin bugs do not kill humans directly. Rather, they are a vector that transmits Chagas disease.)	10,000	12,000		10,000
Tsetse flies (Note: Tsetse flies do not kill humans directly. Rather, they are a vector that transmits sleeping sickness.)	10,000	10,000	10,000	
Scorpions	3,250			2,600
Ascaris	2,500	4,500		2,500
Tapeworms	2,000	700		
Crocodiles	1,000	1,000	1,000	1,000
Elephants	500	500		500
Hippopotamuses	500	500	500	500
Lions	250	22+		
African buffalo	200			
Deer	130			

== See also ==
- List of large carnivores known to prey on humans
