= Adolphe Philippe Millot =

French artist

Adolphe Philippe Millot (English: /miːˈjoʊ/ mee-YOH, French: [adɔlf filip mijo]; 1 May 1857, Paris – 18 December 1921, also Paris) was a French painter, lithographer and entomologist.

Adolphe Philippe Millot, who illustrated many of the natural history sections of Petit Larousse, was the senior illustrator at Muséum national d'histoire naturelle. He was a member of the Salon des Artistes Francaise (honourable mention, 1891) and the Société entomologique de France.

== Gallery ==
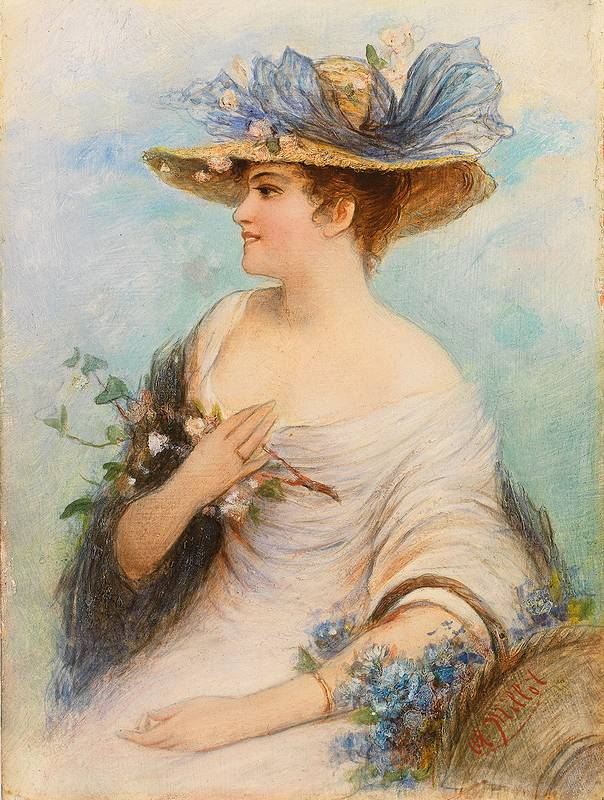
Portrait of a girl

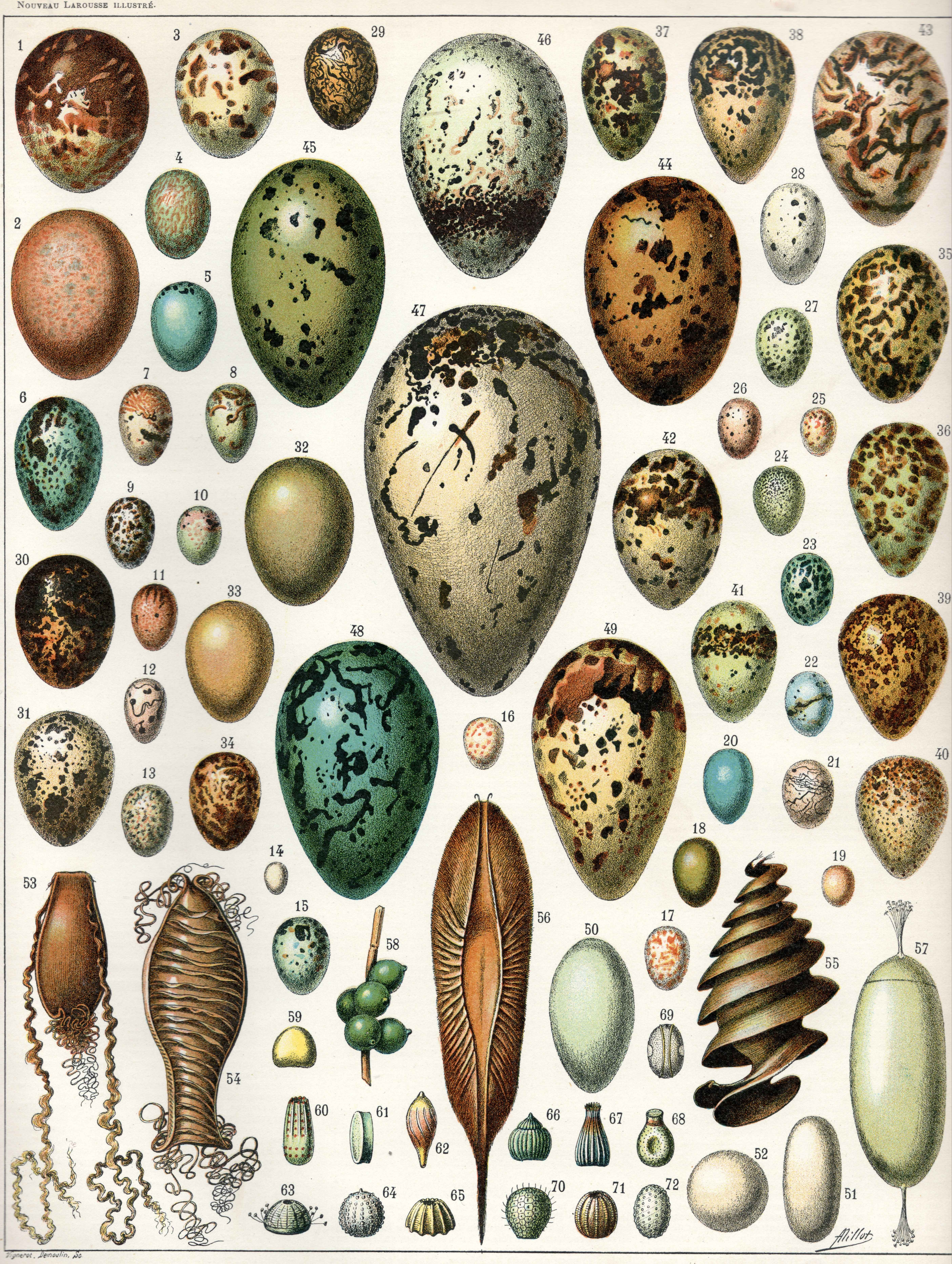
Oeufs, Nouveau Larousse Illustré 1897-1904

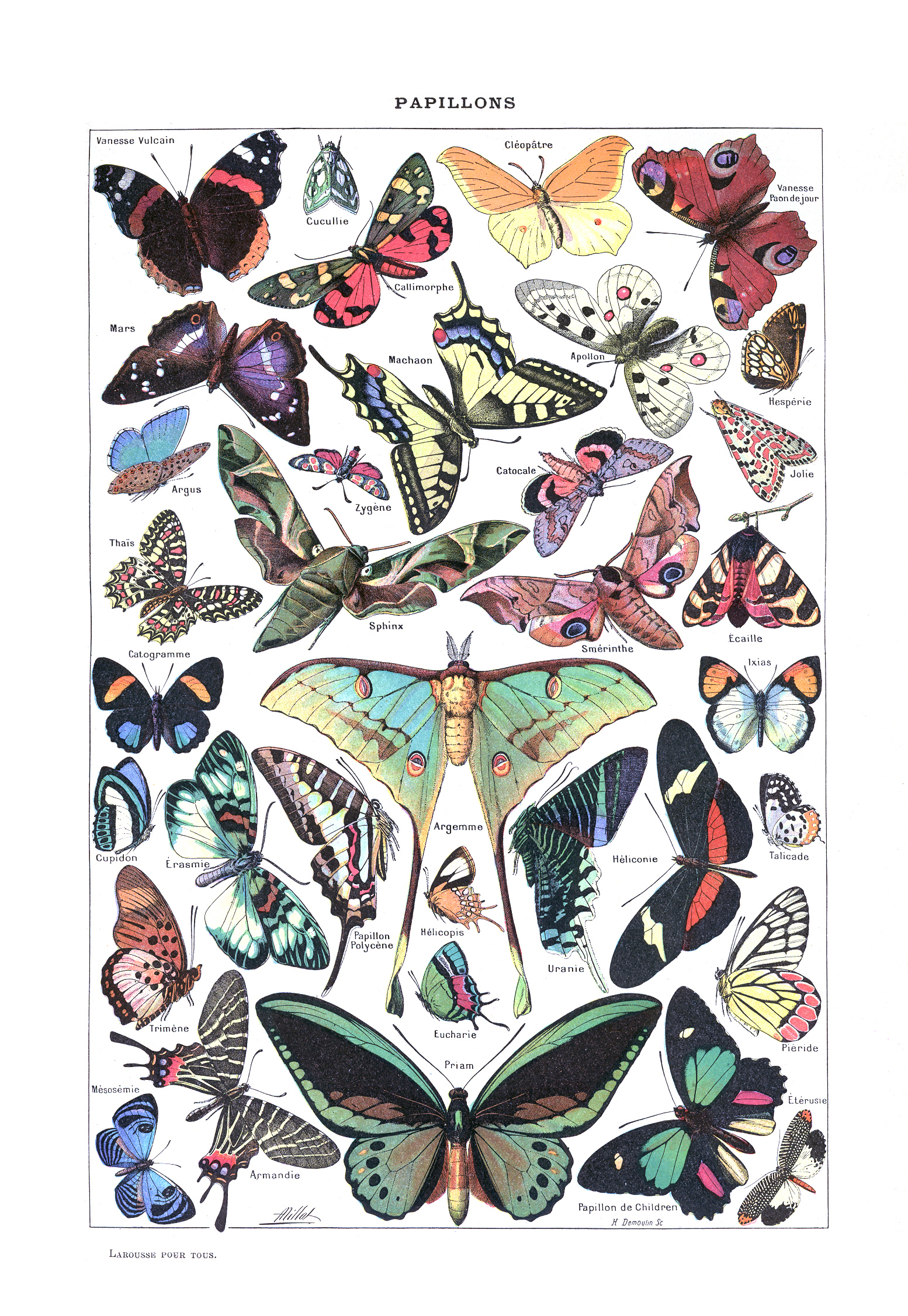
Papillons Larousse pour tous 1907–1910

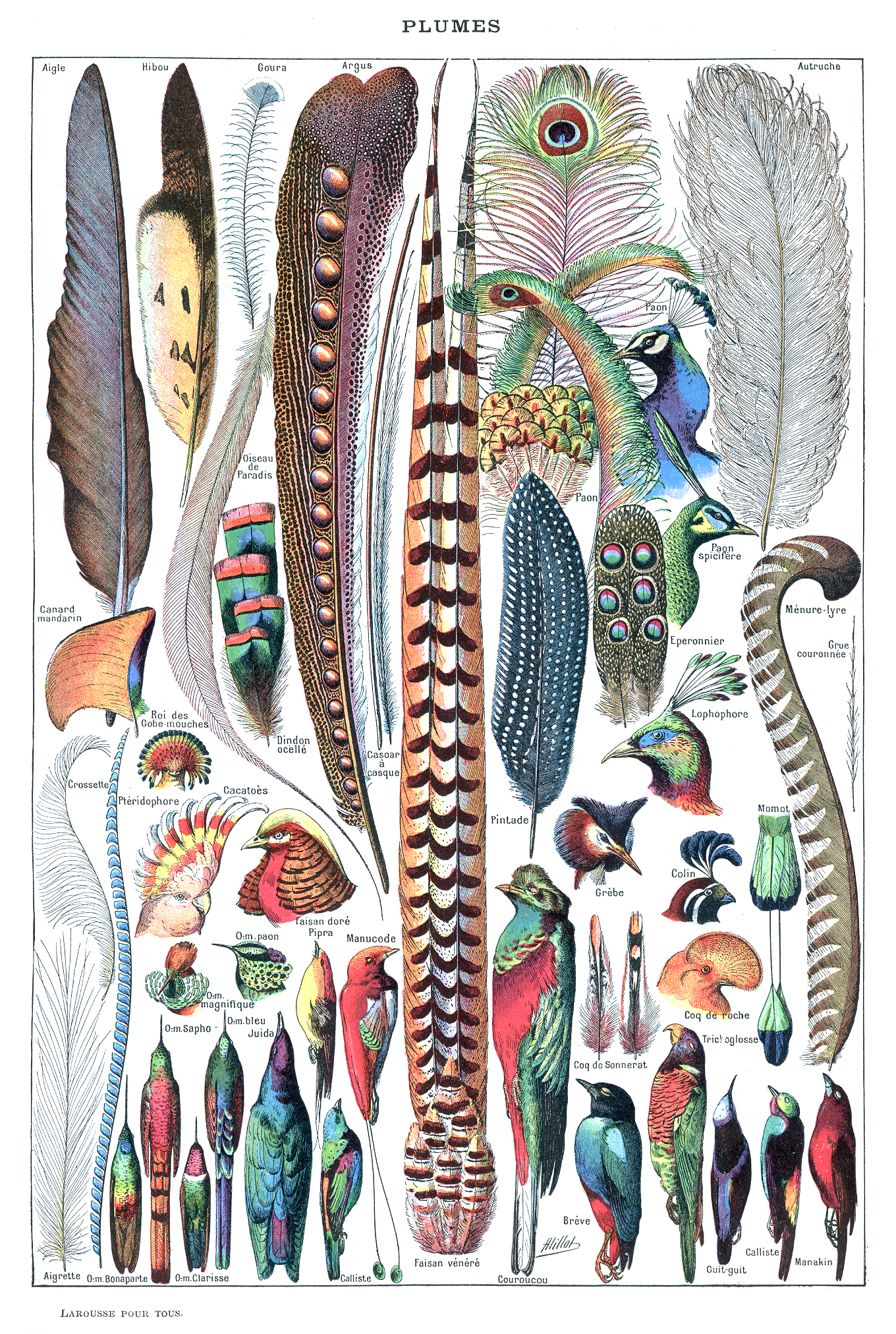
Types de plumes Larousse pour tous 1907–1910

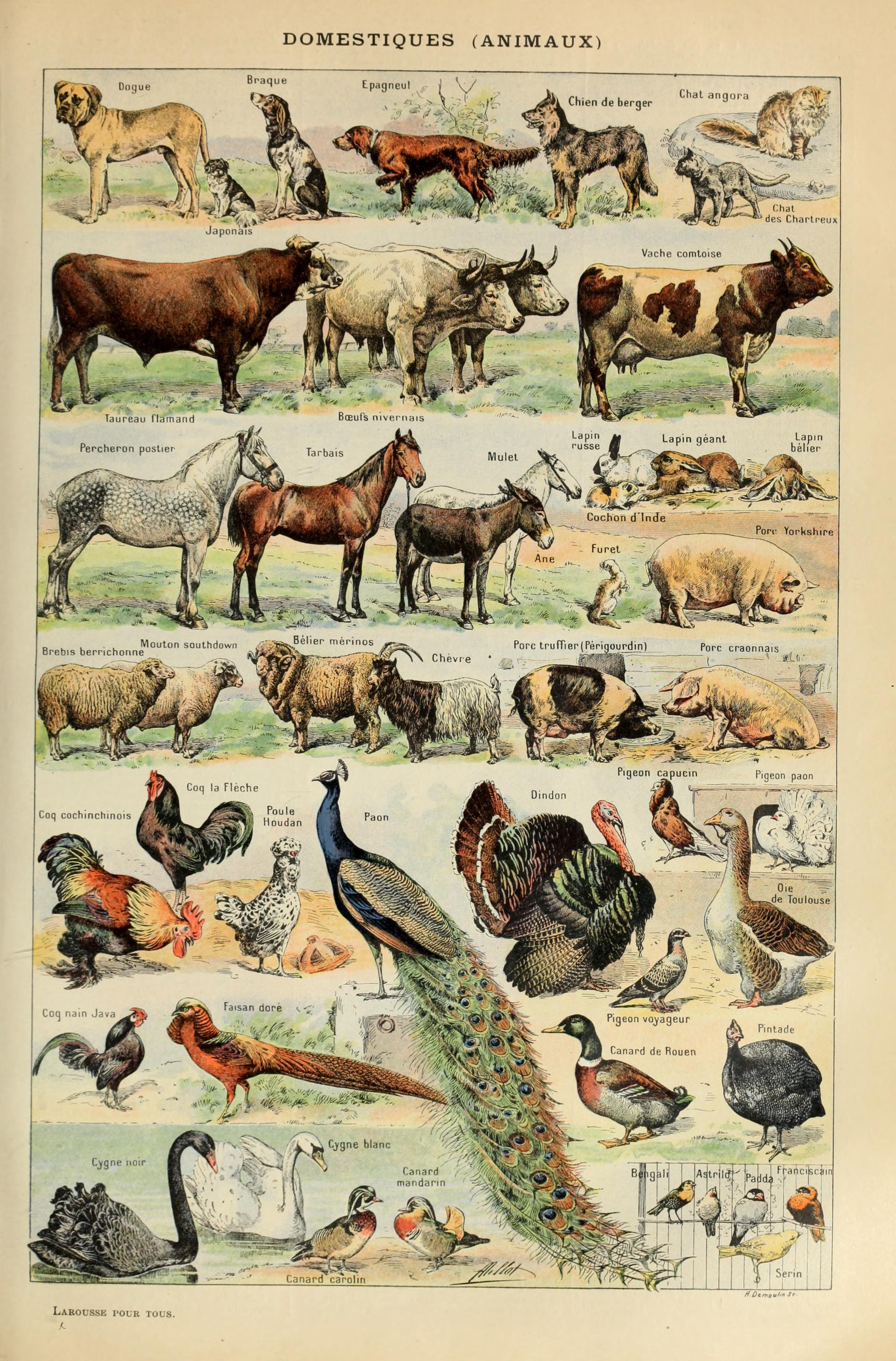
Le Larousse pour tous

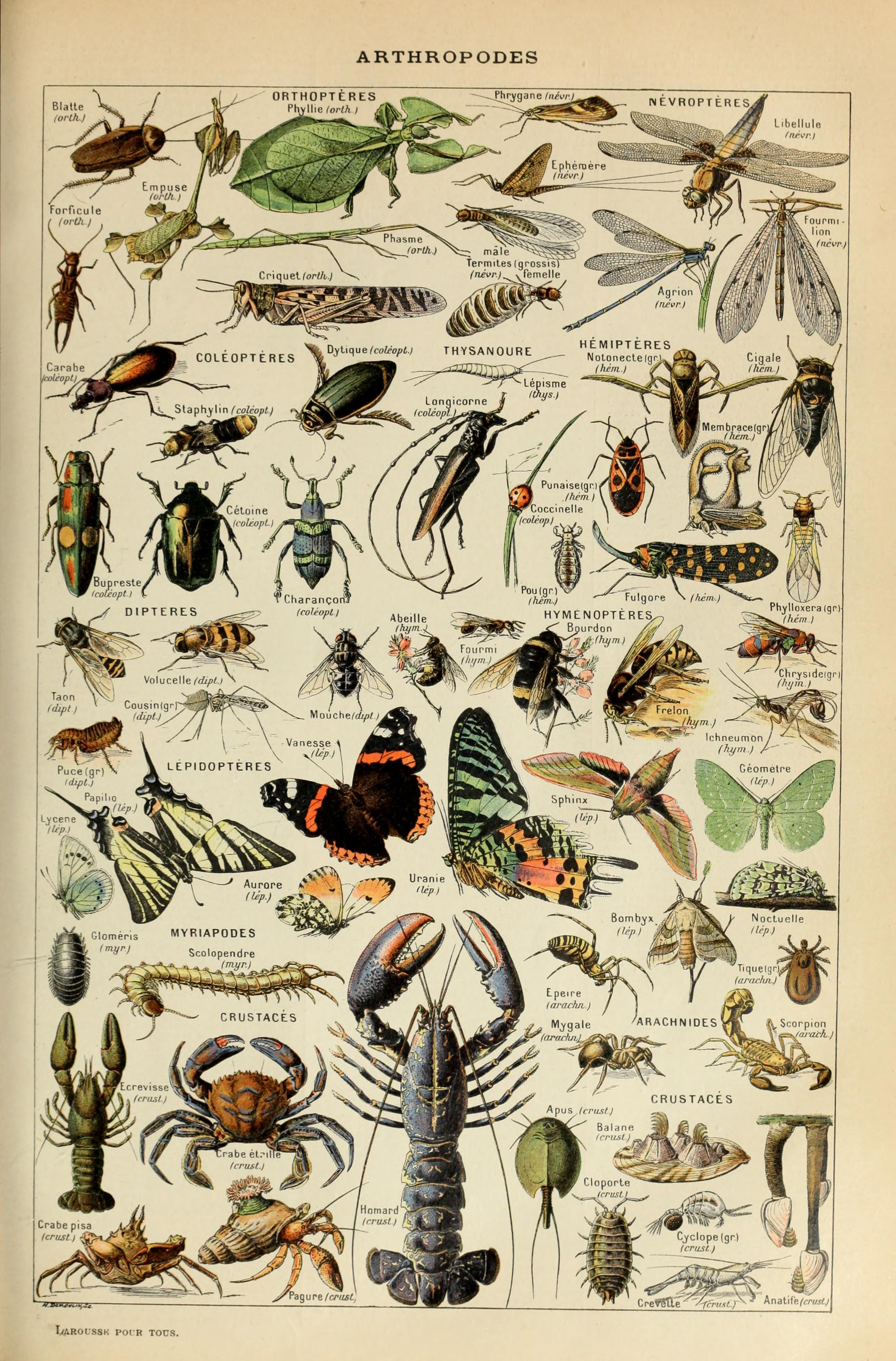

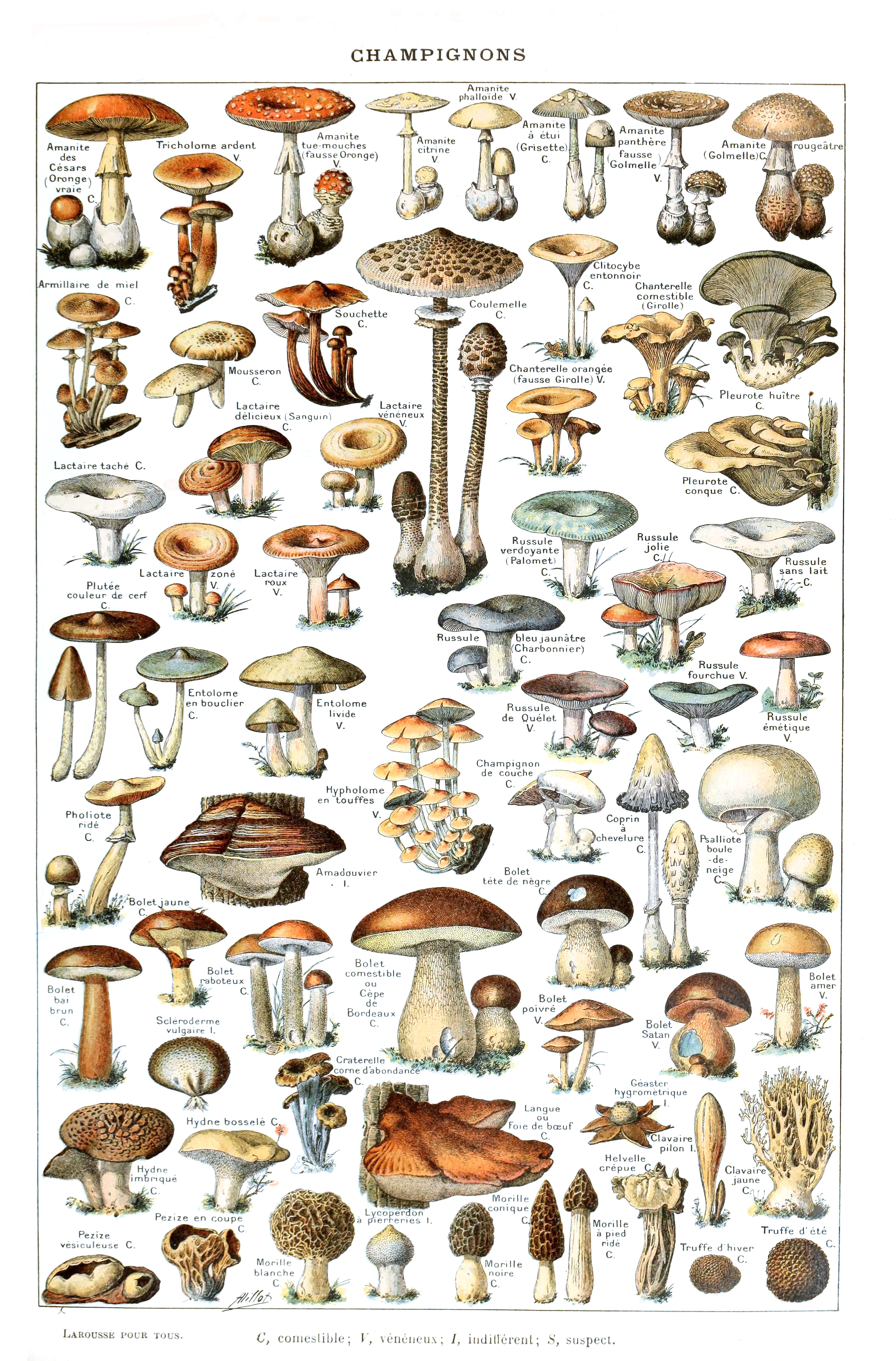

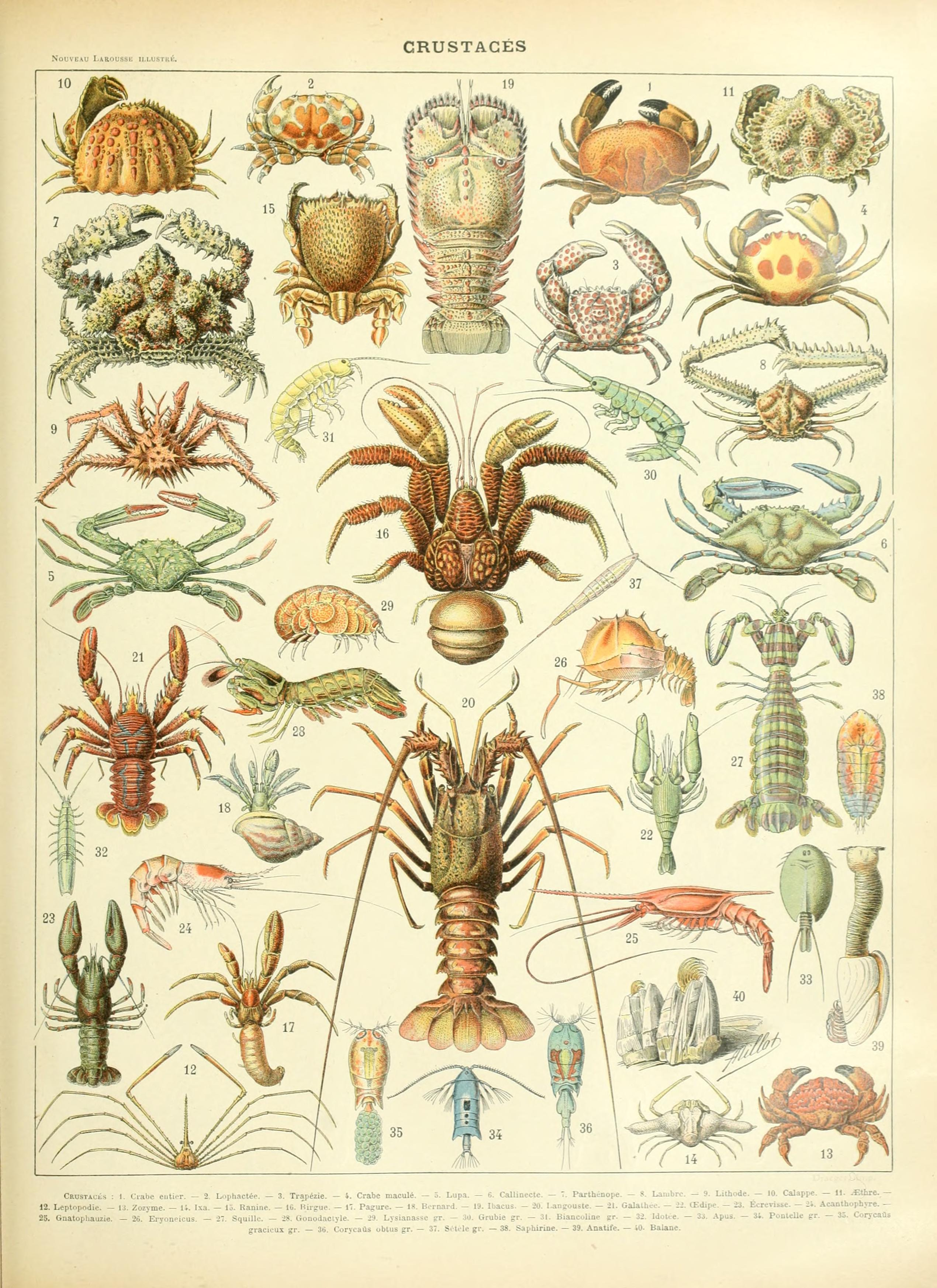

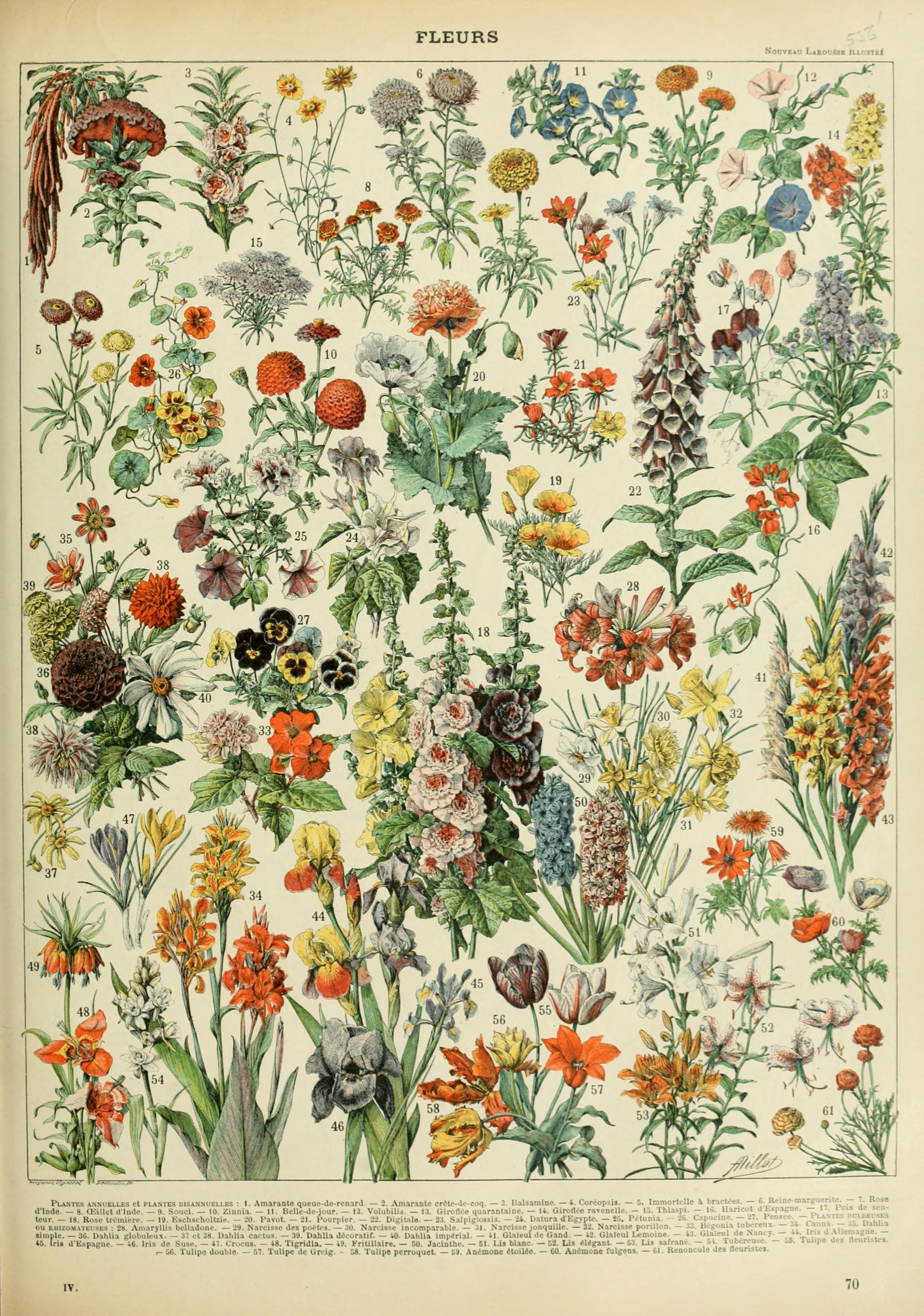

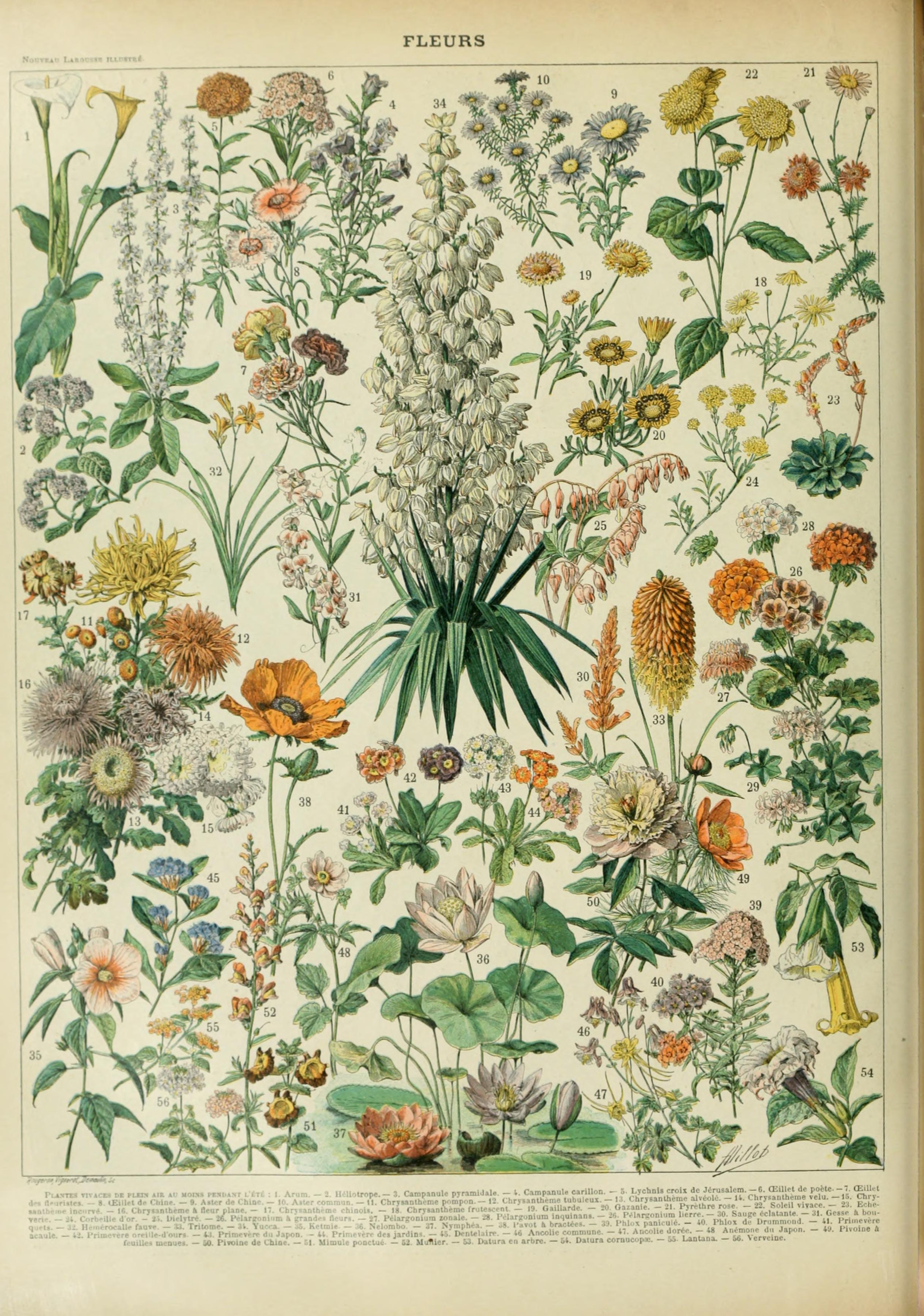

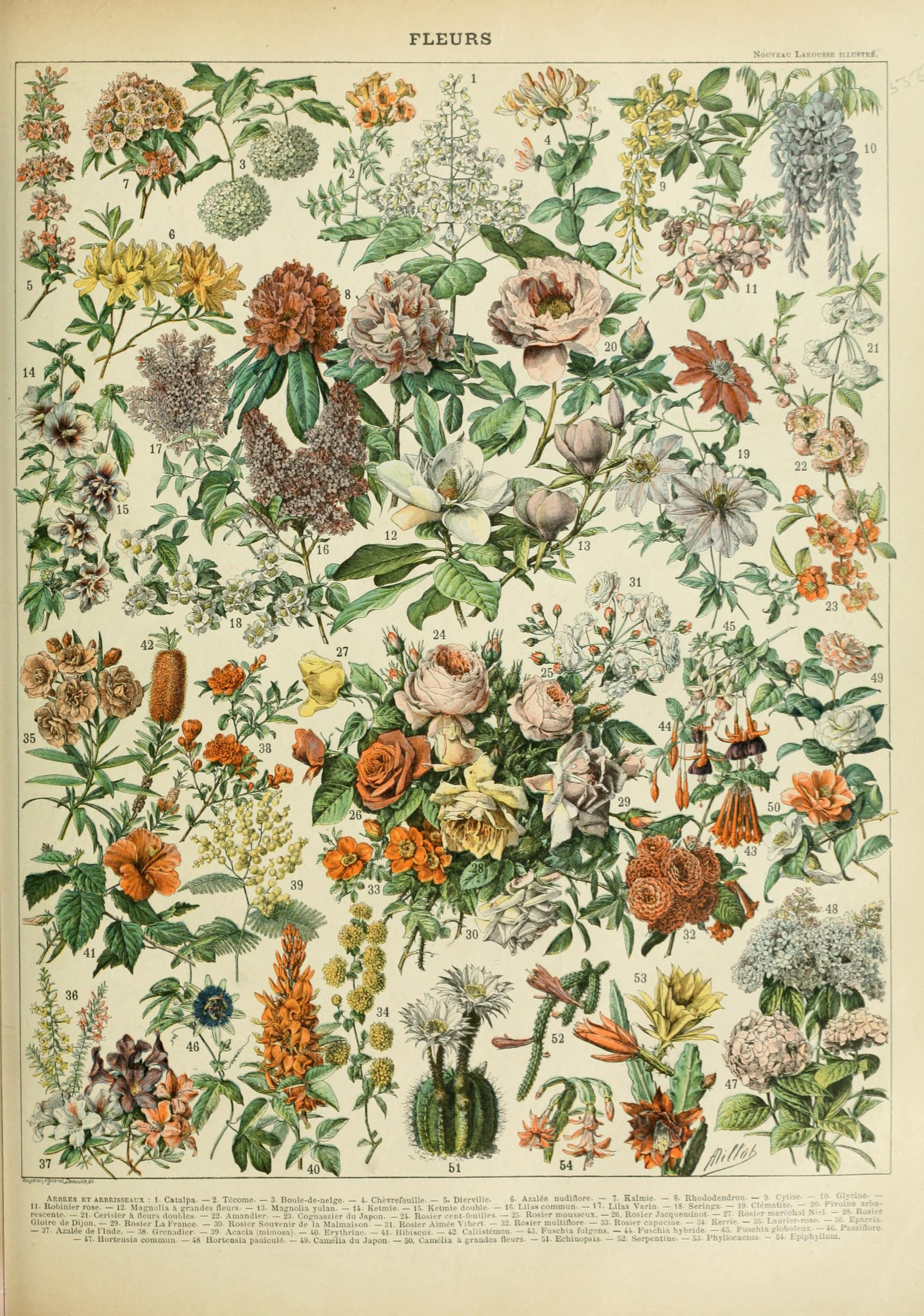

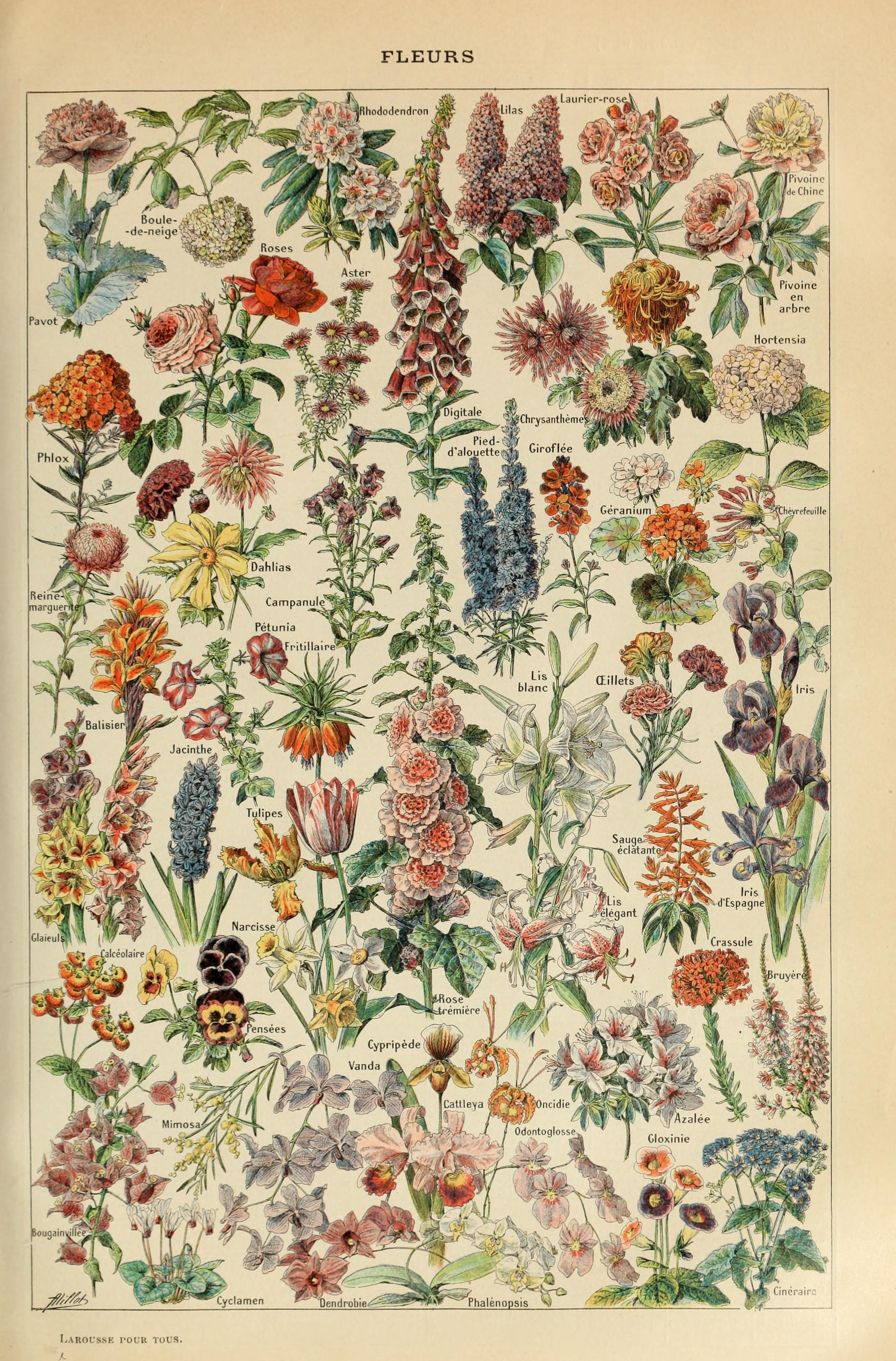

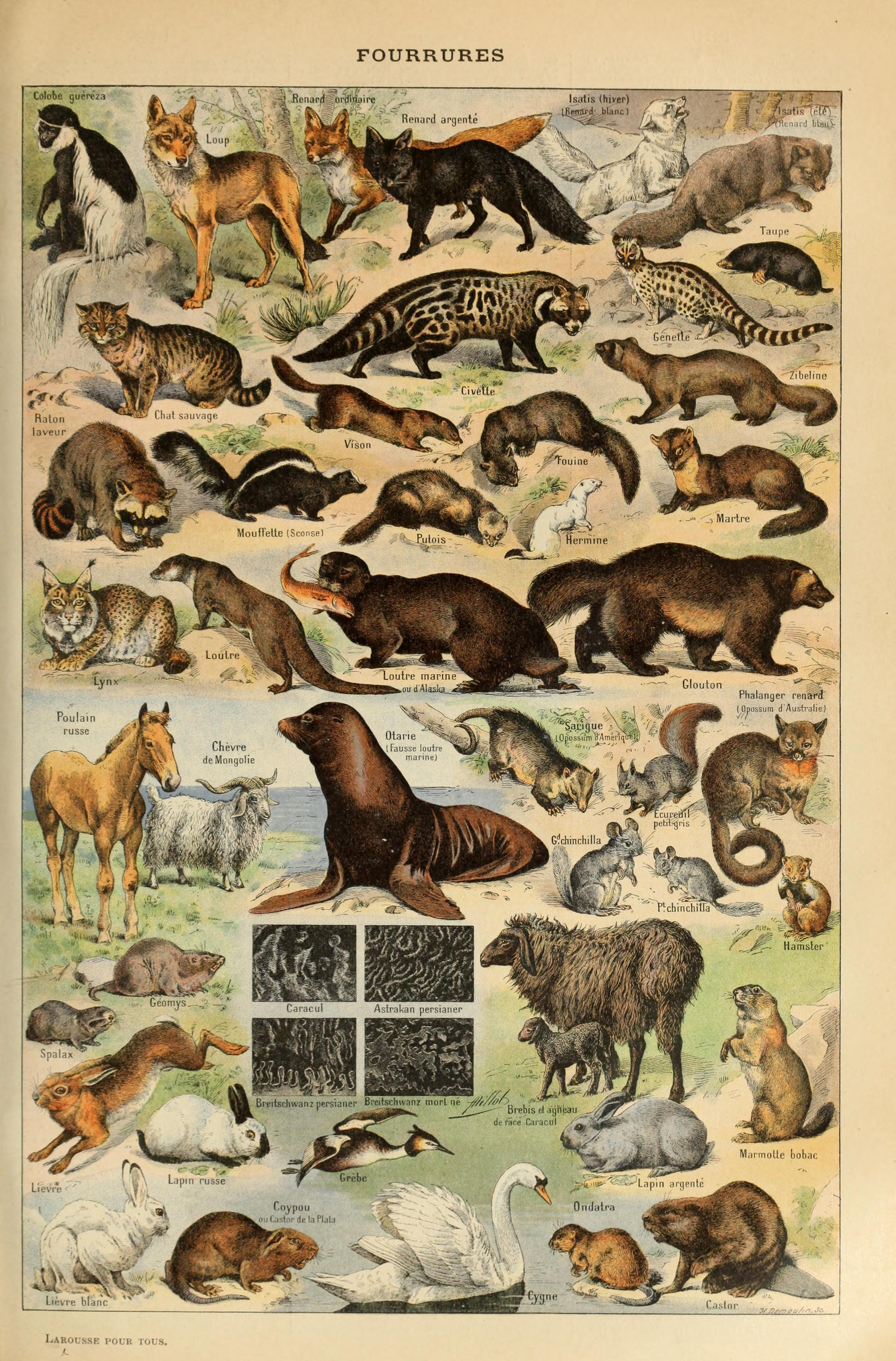

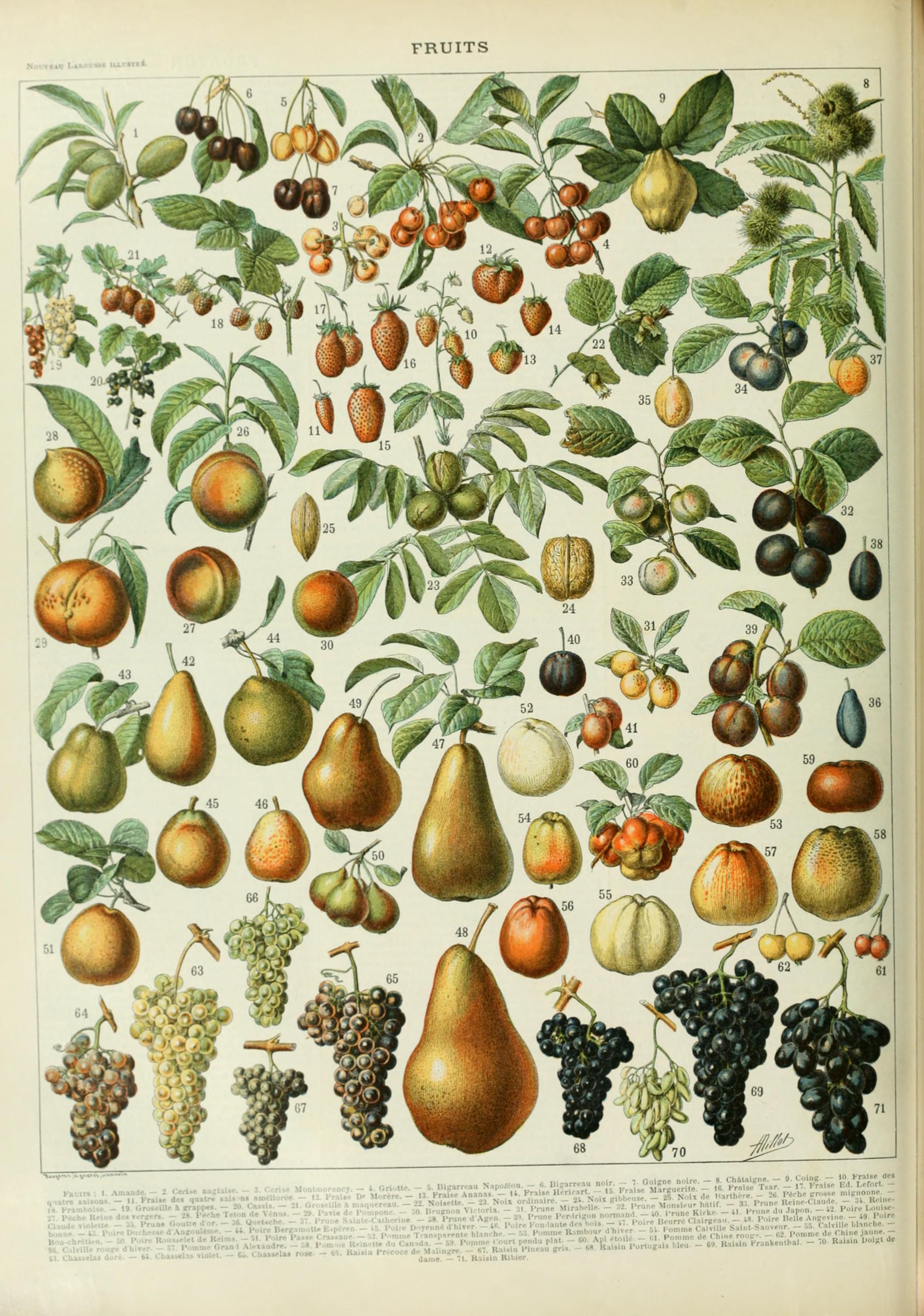

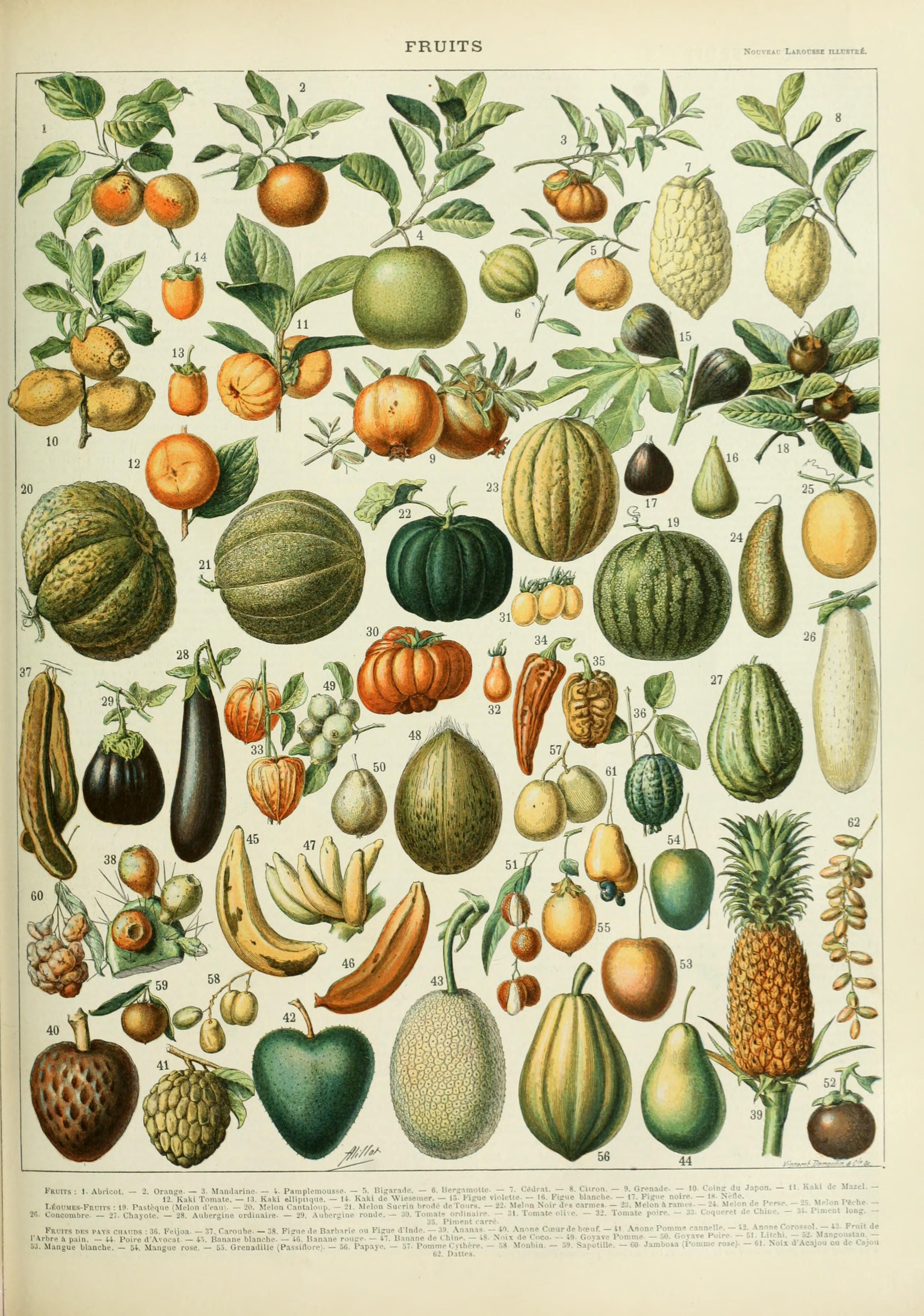

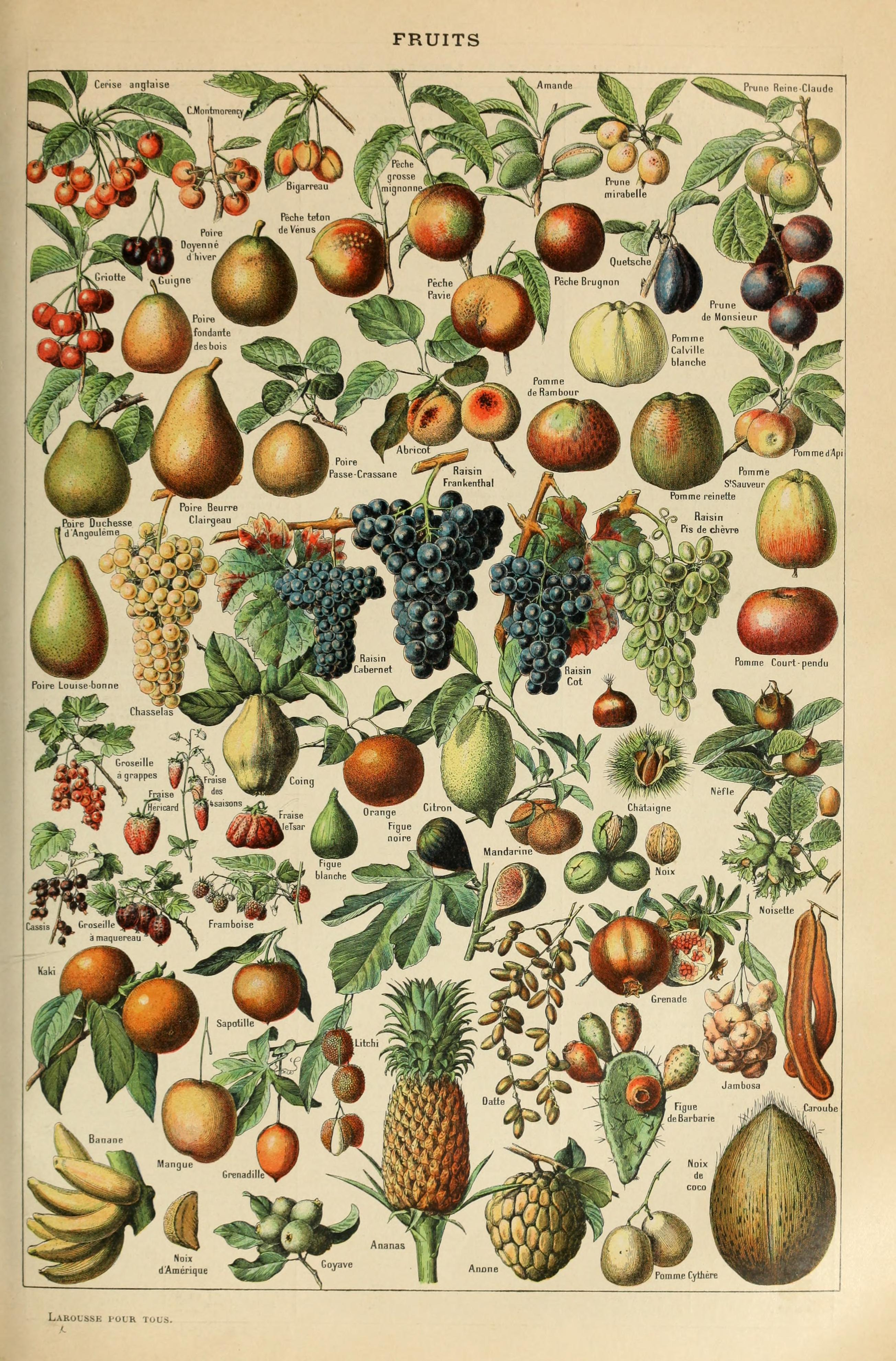

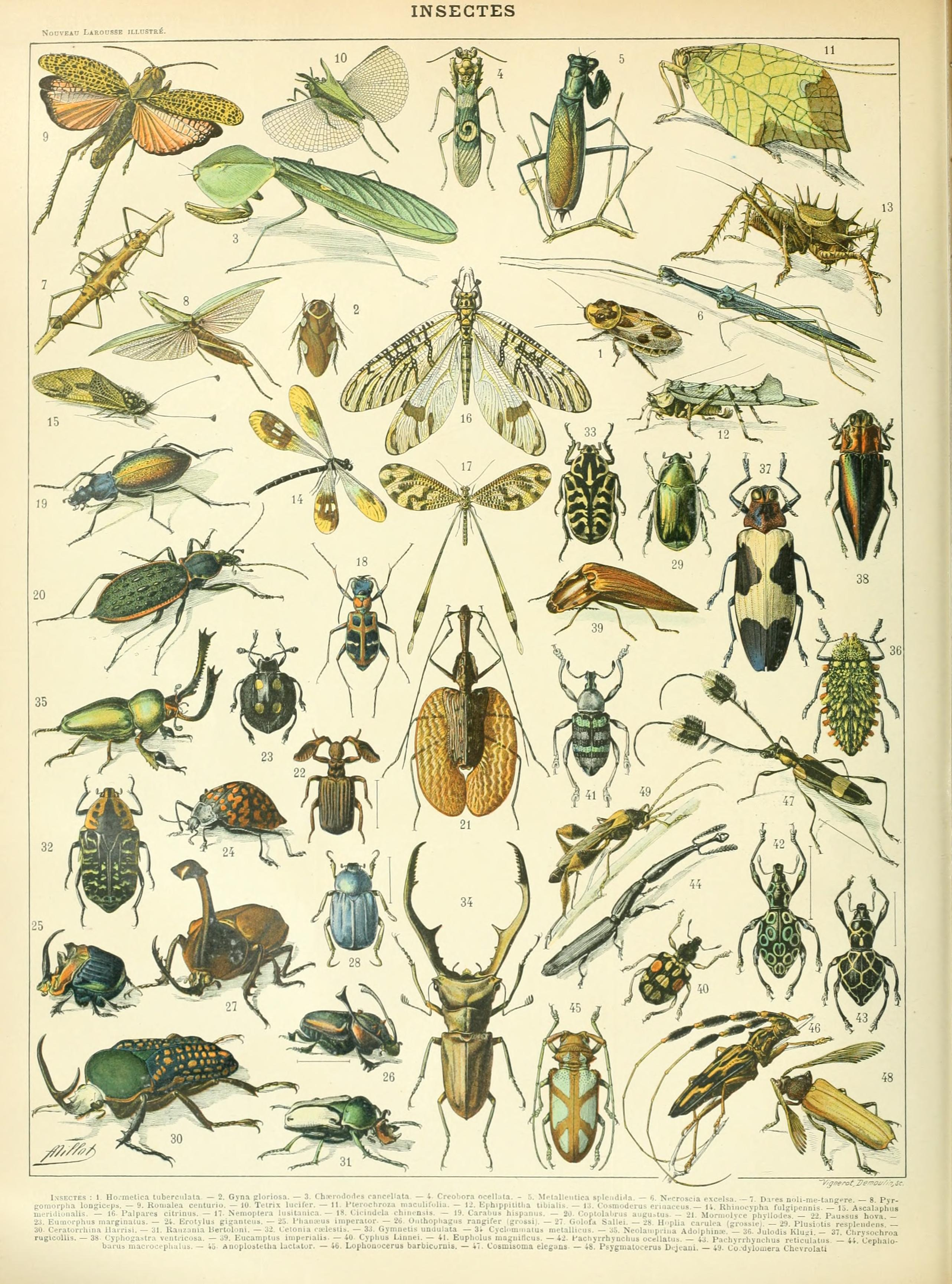

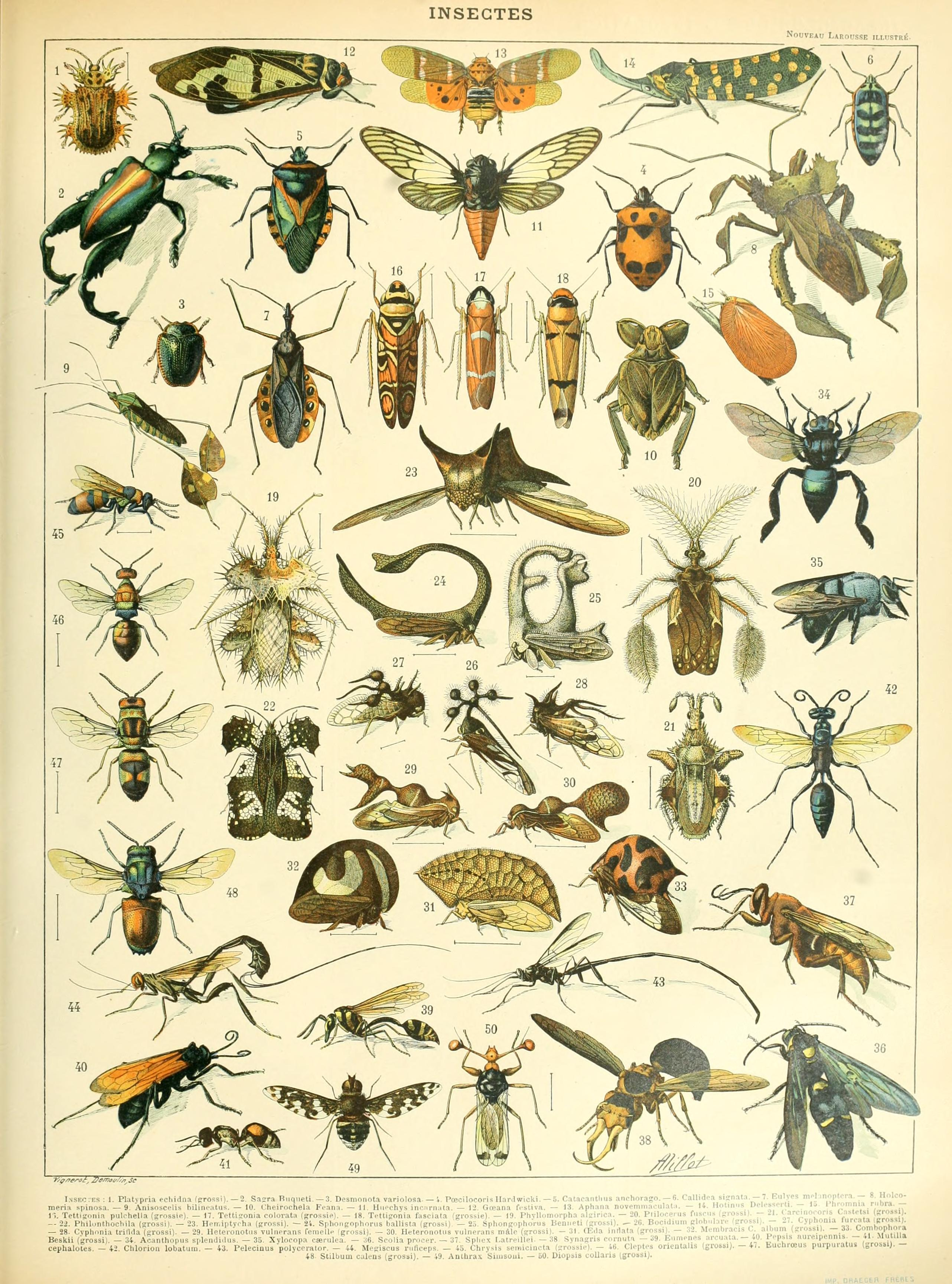

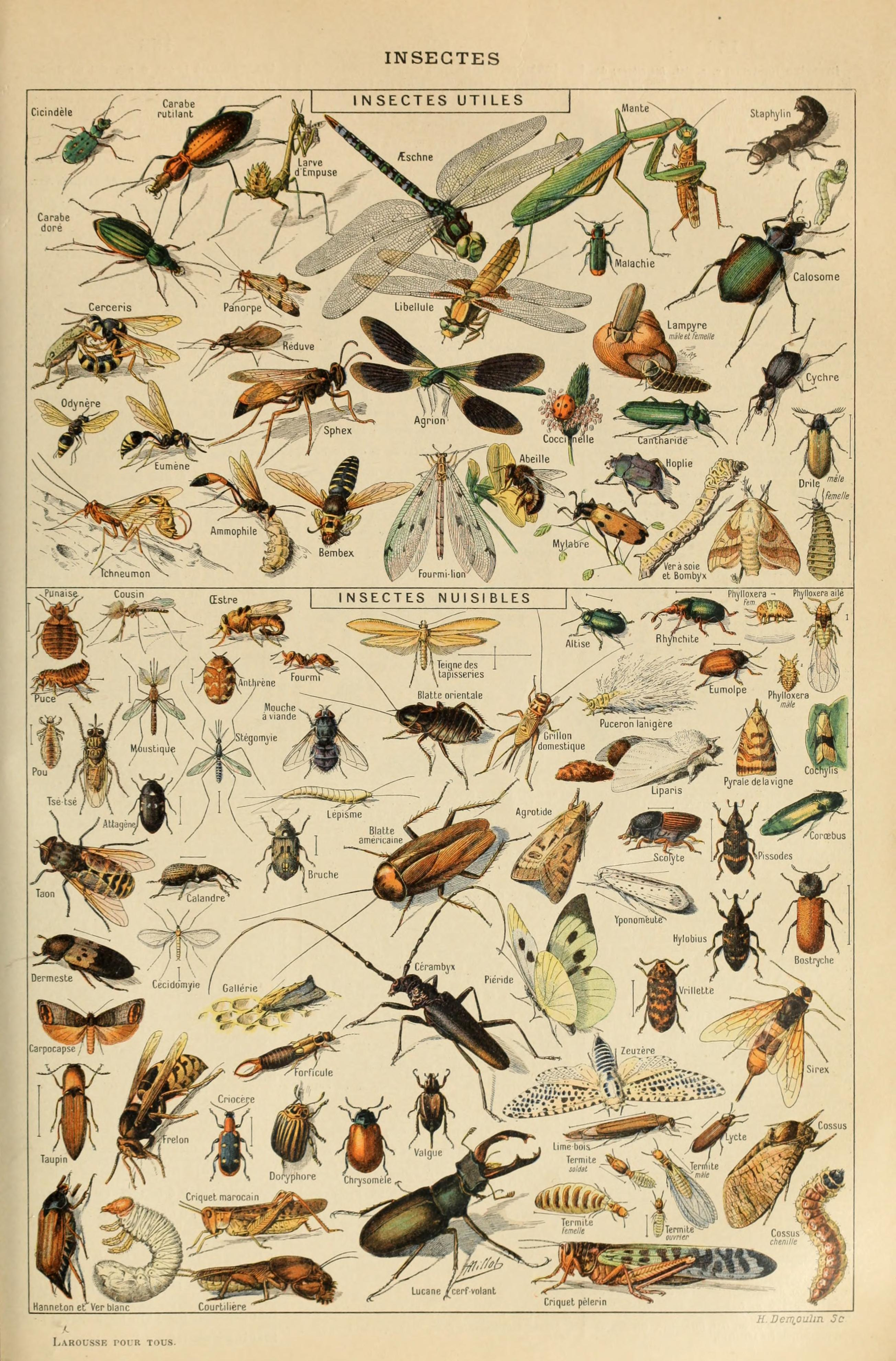

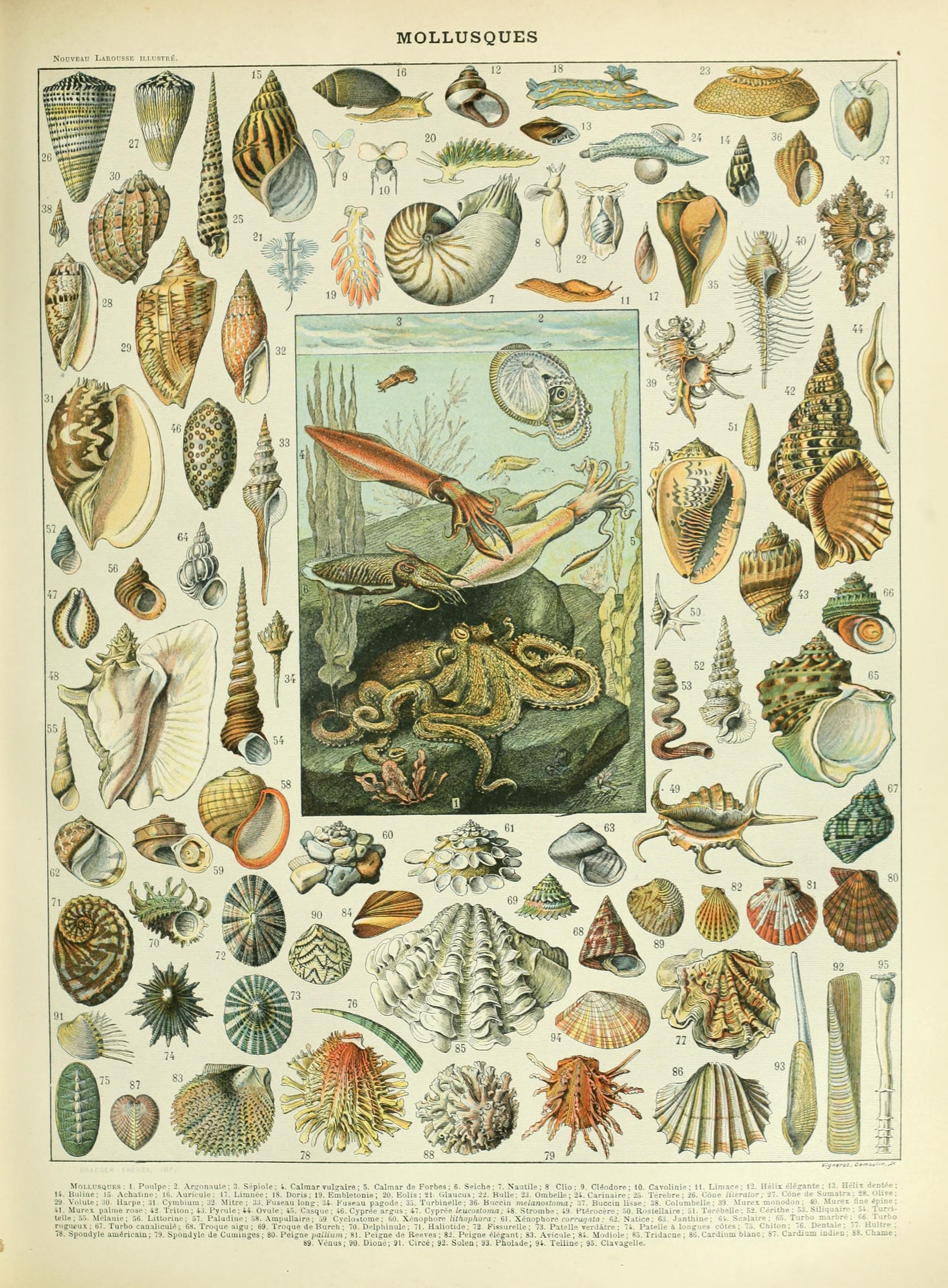

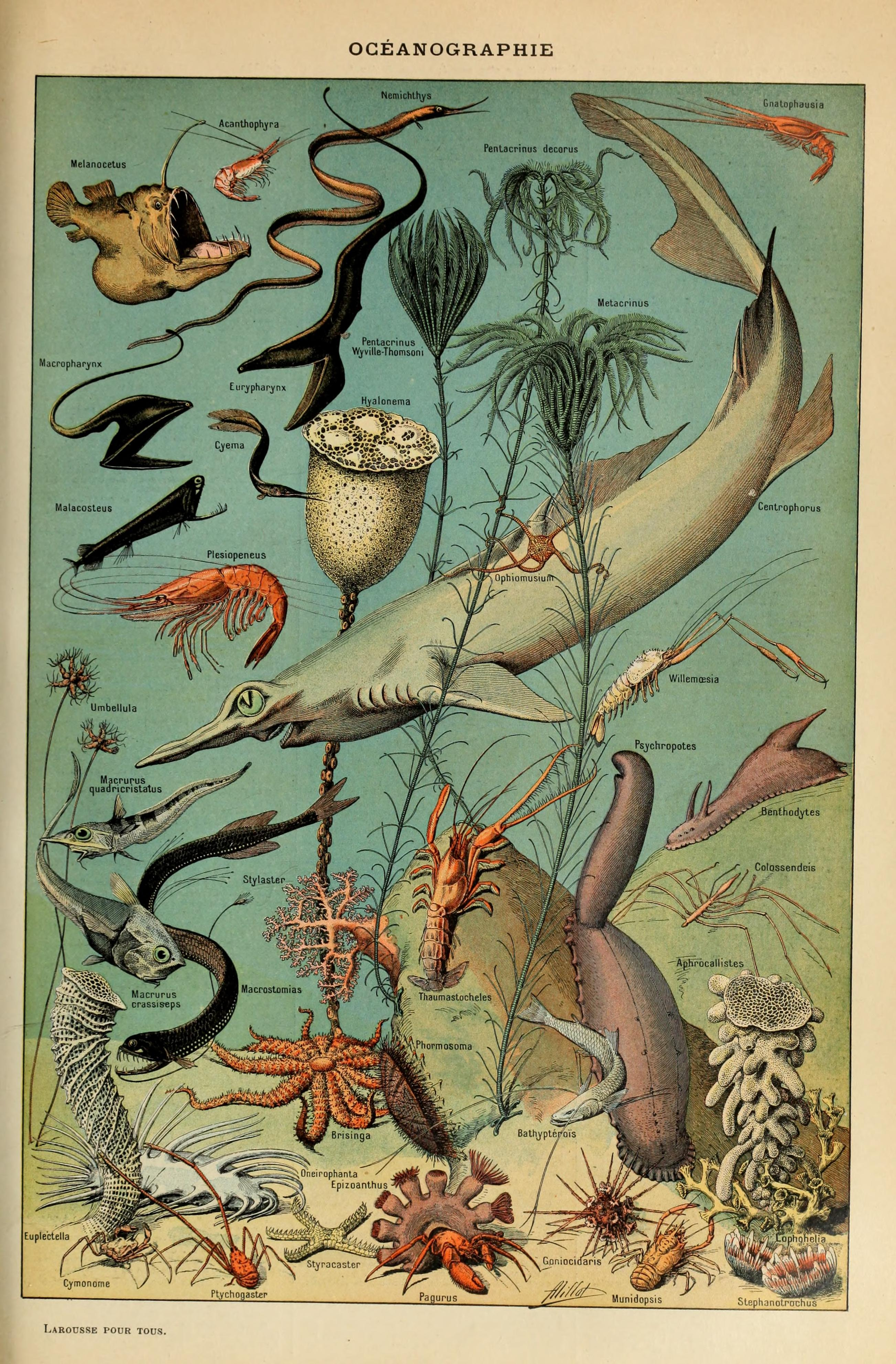
