= Nature fakers controversy =

Academic debate

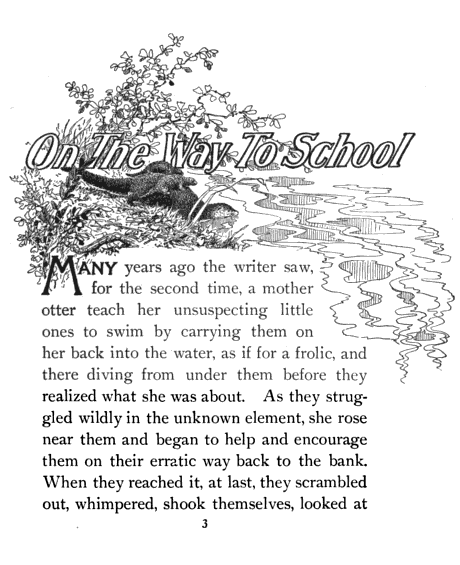
Illustration from William J. Long's School of the Woods (1902), showing an otter teaching her young to swim

The nature fakers controversy was an early 20th-century American literary debate highlighting the conflict between science and sentiment in popular nature writing. The debate involved important American literary, environmental and political figures. Dubbed the "War of the Naturalists" by The New York Times, it revealed seemingly irreconcilable contemporary views of the natural world: while some nature writers of the day argued as to the veracity of their examples of anthropomorphic wild animals, others questioned an animal's ability to adapt, learn, teach, and reason.

The controversy arose from a new literary movement, which followed a growth of interest in the natural world beginning in the late 19th century, and in which the natural world was depicted in a compassionate rather than realistic light. Works such as Ernest Thompson Seton's Wild Animals I Have Known (1898) and William J. Long's School of the Woods (1902) popularized this new genre and emphasized sympathetic and individualistic animal characters. In March 1903, naturalist and writer John Burroughs published an article entitled "Real and Sham Natural History" in The Atlantic Monthly. Lambasting writers such as Seton, Long, and Charles G. D. Roberts for their seemingly fantastical representations of wildlife, he also denounced the booming genre of realistic animal fiction as "yellow journalism of the woods". Burroughs' targets responded in defense of their work in various publications, as did their supporters, and the resulting controversy raged in the public press for nearly six years.

The constant publicity given to the debate contributed to a growing distrust of the truthfulness of popular nature writing of the day, and often pitted scientist against writer. The controversy effectively ended when President Theodore Roosevelt publicly sided with Burroughs, publishing his article "Nature Fakers" in the September 1907 issue of Everybody's Magazine. Roosevelt popularized the negative colloquialism by which the controversy would later be known to describe one who purposefully fabricates details about the natural world. The definition of the term later expanded to include those who depicted nature with excessive sentimentality.

== Background ==
=== Nature boom ===
A renewed public interest in nature and its promise of aesthetic and recreational enjoyment began in the United States during the late 19th century. The country's first national park, Yellowstone, was established in 1872, and by 1900 it had been followed by half a dozen more. Railroads made it easy to get to the parks, and their advertising promoted the wonders of nature that could be seen courtesy of their trains. Tourists frequented the parks regularly, but there were also numerous opportunities for people to enjoy nature and outdoor recreation closer to home. City parks, such as New York City's Central Park, became popular destinations because of their accessibility, and camps like the ones owned by the YMCA were frequented by children of all ages.

Wilderness protection and the conservation movement, led by figures such as John Muir, founder of the Sierra Club, also began to appear at this time. By the turn of the century, those in favor of recreational ideals of nature began to clash with conservationists such as Muir. Likewise, critics and natural scientists became skeptical of what they saw as a growing cult of nature, which was thought to wrongly champion sentimentality and aesthetics rather than scientific facts. Sympathy for animals and their survival also became a developing thought in the 19th century, due in part to wide acceptance of theories pertaining to organic evolution. In 1837, Charles Darwin wrote in his diary that "If we choose to let conjecture run wild, then animals, our fellow brethren in pain, disease, death, suffering and famine—our slaves in the most laborious works, our companions in our amusements—they may partake of our origin in one common ancestor—we may be all melted together."

=== Literature ===
As the popularity and marketability of the natural world rose during the late 19th century, books dedicated to nature came to be in great demand. One reviewer noted in 1901 that "It is a part of the progress of the day that the nature study is coming into prominence in our schemes of education, and, beyond these, is entering into our plans for coveted diversion, yet it is a real surprise that so large and increasing a number of each season's publications are devoted to the purpose." Such literature was regularly published in a wide variety of subjects: children's animal books, wilderness novels, nature guides, and travelogues were all immensely popular. The study of nature quickly became part of the public school curriculum, making nature writing increasingly profitable. As the public's hunger for such imaginative works grew, a new genre in which nature was depicted in a compassionate, rather than realistic, light began to take form.

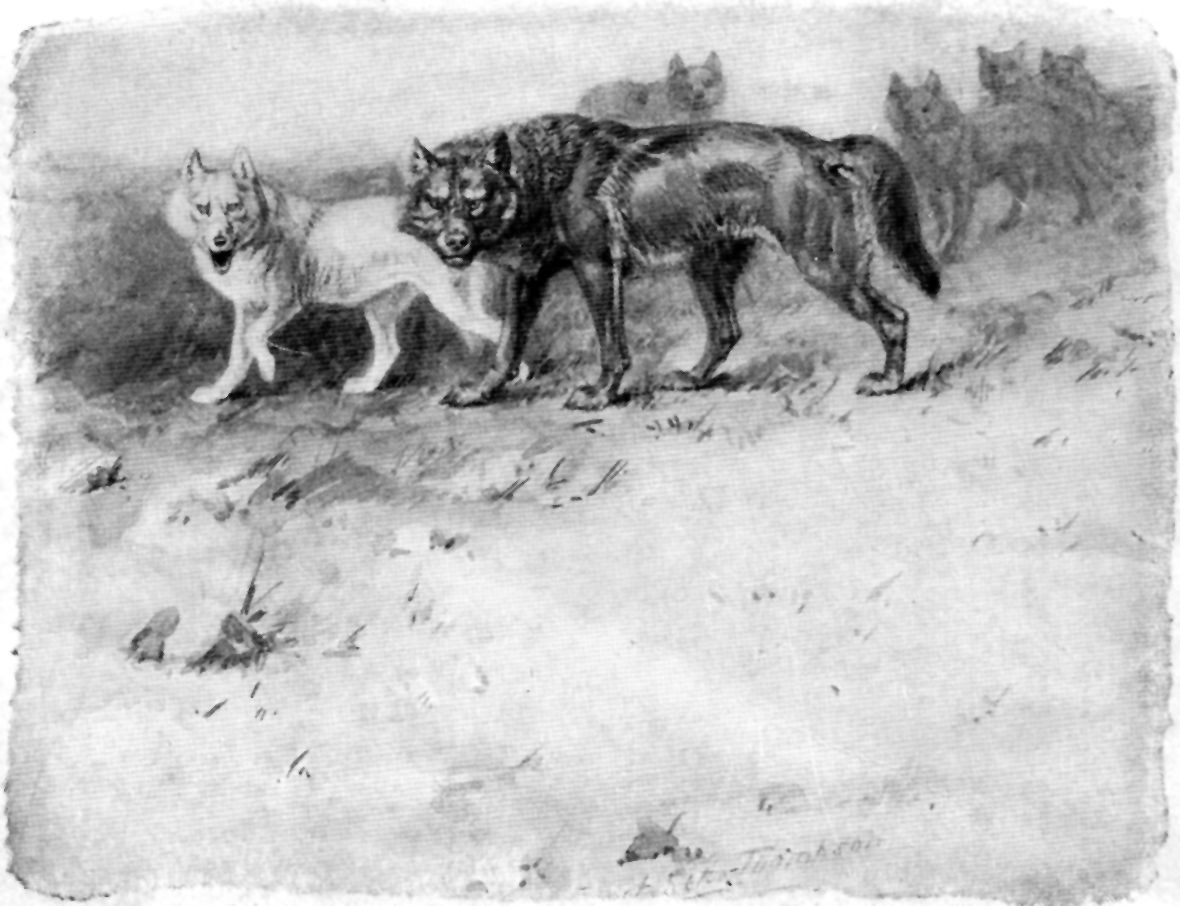
Illustration of the wolf Lobo and his mate Blanca, by Ernest Thompson Seton

The tendency to portray animals as having human traits was not new; Aesop's moralistic animal tales were still popular with readers of the day, and inspired such works as Rudyard Kipling's The Jungle Book (1894). However, one of the features separating the turn-of-the-century animal writers from those before them was the desire to have their animals set an example through their noble, sympathetic characteristics. Anna Sewell's Black Beauty, for example, told the story of a gentle horse seemingly from the animal's own point of view; after being published in the United States by the American Humane Education Society in 1890, Sewell's book helped further the cause against animal cruelty. The budding animal welfare movement helped establish a climate for wider public support of wildlife conservation, and soon nature writers similarly sought to gain sympathy for wild animals—specifically those who seemingly displayed honorable human traits—by depicting them in a positive light. One popular nature writer of the day, Mabel Osgood Wright, told of wolves nobly taking their own lives after losing their mates.

Author and illustrator Ernest Thompson Seton published his first book, the bestselling Wild Animals I Have Known, in 1898. The first entry in a new genre of realistic wild-animal stories, Seton's collection of short stories quickly became one of the most popular books of its day. Although he had considered himself "a naturalist of the usual type, trying merely to accumulate specimens and facts" during his early career, he later began to write factual material "in the form of romantic stories—fiction in the form of presentation, but solid in fact in their basis and their message." The first story in the collection, "Lobo, The King of Currumpaw" was based upon Seton's experience hunting wolves in the Southwest. It became a classic, setting the tone for his future works that would similarly depict animals—especially predators who were often demonized in literature—as compassionate, individualistic beings. Seton was reportedly denounced by readers for having killed Lobo, only to write about the experience; however, as biographer Brian Morris stated, the readers' sympathies "are directed, as Seton meant them to be, toward the wild animal, rather than against the teller of the tale".

Seton's intention in writing his stories was to "freely translate" the animals' language into English, as they "have no speech as we understand it". The stories were typically prefaced by the author's strong assertion of their accuracy, and Wild Animals I Have Known marked the nature writer's first emphasis on the perspective of a wild animal. As Canadian poet and author Charles G.D. Roberts described it, the genre focused on "the personality, individuality, mentality, of an animal, as well as its purely physical characteristics."

== Beginning of controversy (1903) ==
=== "Real and Sham Natural History" ===
Naturalist and writer John Burroughs (1837–1921) was respected for his numerous nature essays. Known as an outspoken advocate for the conservation movement in the United States, he was later described by his biographer Edward Renehan as "a literary naturalist with a duty to record his own unique perceptions of the natural world". Burroughs believed that the nature writer must remain faithful to nature as well as the personal responses to what they witness; he wrote in the introduction to his 1895 book Wake-Robin that the "literary naturalist does not take liberties with facts; facts are the flora upon which he lives. The more and the fresher the facts the better."

When The Atlantic Monthly published a glowing review of the Reverend William J. Long's 1902 work School of the Woods: Some Life Studies of Animal Instinct and Animal Training, Burroughs became incensed. Long had previously published six books, and while Burroughs was not pleased with the clergyman's previous efforts, he believed this particular work was an unacceptable example of nature writing. Long insisted not only that animals demonstrated unique and individualistic behavior, unpredictable to science, but he also wrote that there was "absolutely no limit to the variety and adaptiveness of Nature, even in a single species." Burroughs was not the first to take issue with the growing genre that blurred the line between fact and fiction, or the liberties it often took with the natural world; Ernest Ingersoll also found fault with School of the Woods, stating it "would be an epoch-making book in both zoology and psychology could its statements be established." Believing that authors such as Long were deliberately misleading the public for financial gain, Burroughs decided to prove that their fantastical depictions of wild animals were not only impossible, but ultimately damaging to the general public's understanding of nature.

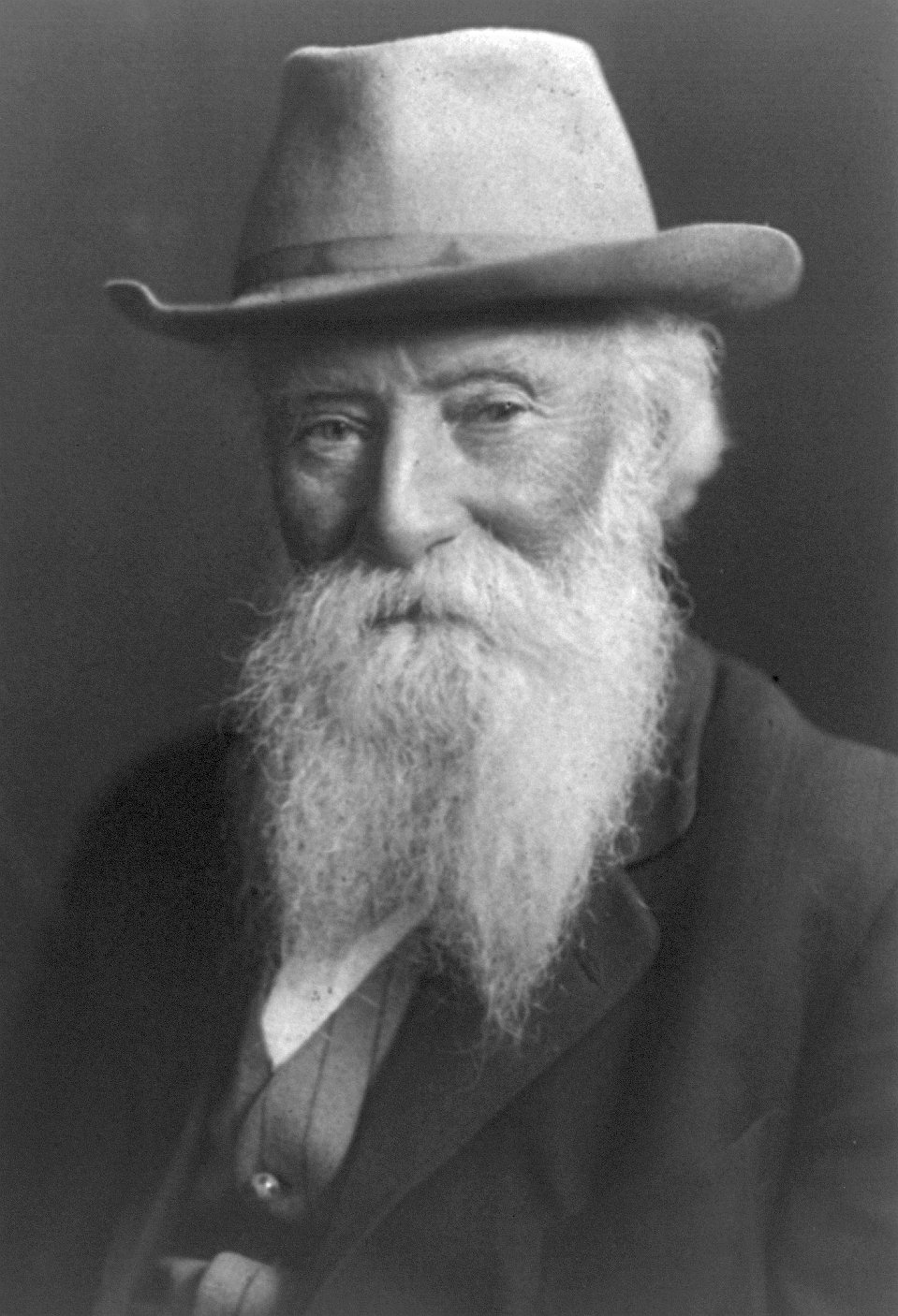
John Burroughs in 1909

In March 1903, Burroughs submitted a scathing essay to The Atlantic Monthly entitled "Real and Sham Natural History"; the editor, Bliss Perry, reportedly found the piece so "ill-natured" and "peevish" that he sent it back to Burroughs for revisions. Burroughs began his article with praise for authors such as Ingersoll, Frank M. Chapman and Florence Merriam Bailey, all of whom he believed exemplified good nature writing. Championing his own strict adherence to observed fact, Burroughs singled out four books for criticism: Seton's Wild Animals I have Known, Roberts' The Kindred of the Wild, William Davenport Hulbert's Forest Neighbours, and Long's School of the Woods. In particular he blamed Seton's collection of stories for founding the sentimental animal story genre; he even amended the title of the collection to Wild Animals I Alone Have Known. Further denouncing Seton's claims that his stories featured events and behaviors he had personally witnessed, Burroughs wrote:

Mr. Thompson Seton says in capital letters that his stories are true, and it is this emphatic assertion that makes the judicious grieve. True as romance, true in their artistic effects, true in their power to entertain the young reader, they certainly are but true as natural history they as certainly are not ... There are no stories of animal intelligence and cunning on record, that I am aware of, that match his.

Chief among Burroughs' complaints was Long's questioning of the role of instinct in animal learning, something that Burroughs and many scientists of the day accepted without doubt. Long had written that after many years of studying wild animals, he was "convinced that instinct plays a much smaller part than we have supposed; that an animal's success or failure in the ceaseless struggle for life depends, not upon instinct, but upon the kind of training which the animal learns from its mother." In reply to this assertion, Burroughs wrote in "Real and Sham Natural History": "The crows do not train their young. They have no fortresses, or schools, or colleges, or examining boards, or diplomas, or medals of honor, or hospitals, or churches, or telephones, or postal deliveries, or anything of the sort. Indeed, the poorest backwoods hamlet has more of the appurtenances of civilization than the best organized crow or other wild animal community in the land!" Burroughs summed up by deeming Long a fraud, stating that his "book reads like that of a man who has really never been to the woods, but who sits in his study and cooks up these yarns from things he has read in Forest and Stream, or in other sporting journals. Of real observation there is hardly a vestige in his book; of deliberate trifling with natural history there is no end".

Soon after the publication of Burroughs' article, The Atlantic Monthly began receiving responses from readers. Among the many letters written in support for Burroughs' assertions was an article published in the Boston Evening Transcript in defense of Long's reputation as both a writer and a respected man of the cloth. Written by fellow clergyman Charles Prescott Daniels, the article, which was titled "Discord in the Forest: John Burroughs vs. William J. Long", suggested that Burroughs left "the reader with a kinder feeling for Mr. Long than for Mr. Burroughs, and [left] him, too, with a suspicion that, after all, the beasts and birds will forgive Mr. Long for having so amiably misrepresented them."

=== Long's response ===
Many of the authors Burroughs criticized in his essays chose not to issue direct rebuttals. As Jack London would later write, they chose to simply "climb a tree and let the cataclysm go by". Seton, who had previously met Burroughs and had a great deal of respect for the elder naturalist, was confident enough in his own reputation so as not to stage a public reply. Other authors wrote to both him and Burroughs in Seton's defense, however; author and editor Hamlin Garland both wrote to Burroughs and spoke to him personally in this regard, saying that Seton's "stories are based on careful observation." Three weeks after Burroughs' article appeared in The Atlantic Monthly, he and Seton met at a literary dinner given by Andrew Carnegie; while accounts of the meeting vary, the two men seemed to make amends.

William J. Long, on the other hand, readily became a publicly vocal enemy of the naturalist after receiving much of Burroughs' initial criticism. A Congregationalist minister from Massachusetts, Long was an amateur naturalist and avid camper who spent summers hiking in Canada. Shortly after Burroughs published his initial essay, Long was reported to have previously resigned from his parish so as to devote himself to writing and lecturing on nature full-time. Rather than be discouraged by Burroughs' criticism—which included the other man calling Long "the worst of these nature-writing offenders"—within weeks of the publication of "Real and Sham Natural History", Long submitted a stern reply to the Boston Evening Transcript. Two months later, he published a longer article titled "The Modern School of Nature-Study and its Critics" in the North American Review.

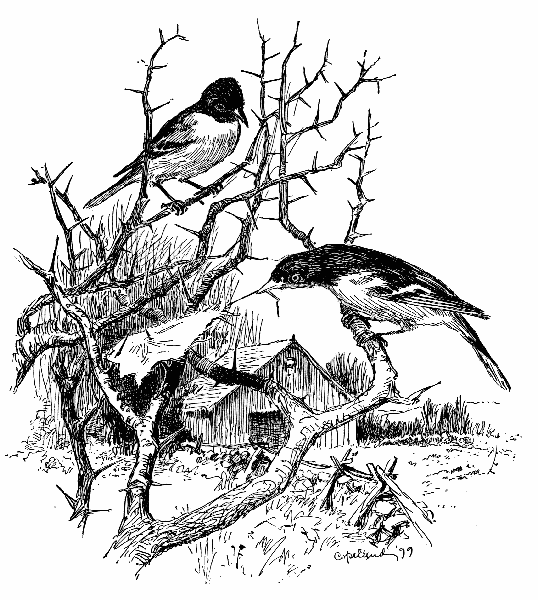
Illustration of orioles who have devised a way of gathering thread from a piece of cloth, from Long's Way of the Wood Folk

In the latter essay, Long insisted that there was a difference between the study of nature and the study of science; whereas science concerned itself with laws and generalizations, the study of nature was far more complex as it allowed for the recognition of individual life forms. He wrote, "The difference between Nature and Science is the difference between a man who loves animals, and so understands them, and the man who studies Zoology; it is the difference between the woman who cherishes her old-fashioned flower-garden and the professor who lectures on Botany in a college class-room." Long's intention was to divide the old school naturalists (which included Burroughs among its members) from what he saw as the newly formed school, of which he was part, whose members were capable of seeing animals as individuals. Because he wrote personal nature essays, and not scientific reports, Long believed that his readers required from him "not simply eyes and ears and a note-book; but insight, imagination, and, above all, an intense human sympathy, by which alone the inner life of an animal becomes luminous, and without which the living creatures are little better than stuffed specimens".

While his explanation was found to be credible by some readers, Long's critics faulted an example he gave of two orioles he had seen building a nest outside his window. Intended to prove his thesis about the unpredictable and adaptive nature of wild animals, he wrote of how the pair "plainly deliberated" their elaborate swinging nest that had been made out of three sticks fastened together; when finished, the birds then "tied a single knot at the extreme end" of a dangling string so it would not unravel over time. Burroughs and his allies were again incensed at Long's insistence that what he wrote was based entirely upon fact, and quickly responded with criticism; Burroughs' written reply reportedly proved to be almost too harsh for publication. The Atlantic Monthly did not wish to escalate the debate, so it was ultimately published by Century Magazine. Evoking Long's story of the orioles, Burroughs wrote, "After such an example as this, how long will it be before the water-birds will be building little rush cradles for their young or rush boats driven about the ponds and lakes by means of leafy sails, or before Jenny Wren will be living in a log cabin of her own construction?"

== Escalation (1903–1904) ==
=== Animal surgery ===
Threatened financially by Burroughs' condemnation, Long's publishers came to their client's defense by distributing a pamphlet defending his positions. In late 1903, Long published a new book titled A Little Brother to the Bear. In the preface, he wrote: "Except where it is plainly stated otherwise, all the incidents and observations have passed under my own eyes and have been confirmed later by other observers ... I have simply tried to make all these animals as interesting to the reader as they were to me when I discovered them." While The New York Times reviewed it favorably, pointing out its "close observation and loving attention to the details of wood life", Long's critics were quick to note a number of propositions regarding wildlife. An essay in the book titled "Animal Surgery", in which Long wrote of various animals' ability to treat and mend their own injuries, particularly riled his critics. He told of how animals such as muskrat, beaver and bear were capable of intentionally bandaging their wounds and stumps of amputated limbs by coating them with materials such as tree resin or clay to keep the injury clean. The example that received the greatest attention was the story about a "woodcock genius" who set his own broken leg and applied a cast to the injury:

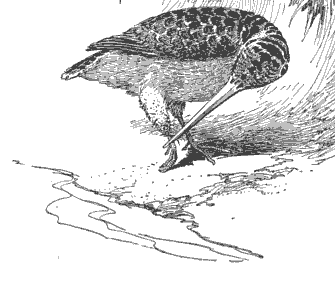
The "woodcock genius" sets his broken leg with a cast made of clay and straw; illustration by Charles Copeland

At first he took soft clay in his bill from the edge of the water and seemed to be smearing it on one leg near the knee. Then he fluttered away on one foot for a short distance and seemed to be pulling tiny roots and fibers of grass, which he worked into the clay that he had already smeared on his leg. Again he took some clay and plastered it over the fibers, putting on more and more till I could plainly see the enlargement, working away with strange, silent intentness for fully fifteen minutes, while I watched and wondered, scarce believing my eyes. Then he stood perfectly still for a full hour under an overhanging sod, where the eye could with difficulty find him, his only motion meanwhile being an occasional rubbing and smoothing of the clay bandage with his bill, until it hardened enough to suit him, whereupon he fluttered away from the brook and disappeared in the thick woods.

Long's theories about animal surgery garnered negative attention from the scientific community as well as the literary; biologist William Morton Wheeler wrote to Science in February 1904 that Long's story was "a series of anecdotes which for rank and impossible humanization of the animal can hardly be surpassed." Other scientists agreed about the dubiousness of Long's claims, and publicly rebuked him for not providing evidence as to his observations in a scientifically-accepted format. Long responded in turn, insisting that "If scientists and comparative-psychologists are honestly looking for new facts in the animal world, I have enough to fill several regular editions of Science, every one of which is supported not only by my own personal observation, but by the testimony of other honest men whose word can be taken without hesitation." As to the woodcock story, Long provided several accounts from other men who had witnessed as much; an Ohio man, for example, reportedly found upon shooting a similar bird that it "had evidently broken its leg above the knee joint. There was a bandage around it, composed of a hard clay-like substance, interwoven with grass or a woody fiber of some kind. The bone seemed to have been set properly and had knit perfectly." None of Long's witnesses were able to provide specimens for study, however, and Science followed Long's essay with the note, "We Hope that this discussion will not be carried further."

=== Animal psychology ===
Ruminating on his previous clashes with Long in regard to an animal's ability to learn behaviors, Burroughs began to focus the ire of his essay-writing on those who upheld the idea of animal psychology. In a series of articles published in Century Magazine, he steadfastly argued that animals functioned on little more than instinct and a very limited ability to learn from experience. He wrote that creatures, unlike humans, are "rational without reason, and wise without understanding." Although mainly repeating his earlier points, one of Burroughs' essays was accompanied by a cartoon parodying Long's School of the Woods; dubbed "A Lesson in Wisdom", it showed Mother Nature sitting in a field surrounded by five foxes who look on as she reads from a book titled The Fox Who Lost His Tail in the Trap.

The belief that animals were intelligent enough to learn and reason, much like a human, was largely born from Darwin's assertion of the evolutionary link between humans and animals. Beginning in the late 19th century and into the early 20th century, the progression from the cause of animal welfare—due to the budding belief that animals could feel pain and suffering—to that of an animal's mental capacity was readily made in popular nature writing. Therefore, Long was not the first to write of the learned intelligence of animals. Seton often stressed in his stories the wit of the animals he witnessed, as well as the fact that most of them had been "taught" survival skills by either their mothers or their pack leaders. Other writers supported the idea of animal education: Ernest Ingersoll wrote of "morning lessons" in hunting for nuts, and respected bird watcher Olive Thorne Miller described several different teaching endeavors, such as a music lesson taught from one mother bird to her chicks. Miller would also suggest, although partly in jest, that even some of the flowers were intelligent.

== Controversy dies down (1904–1905) ==
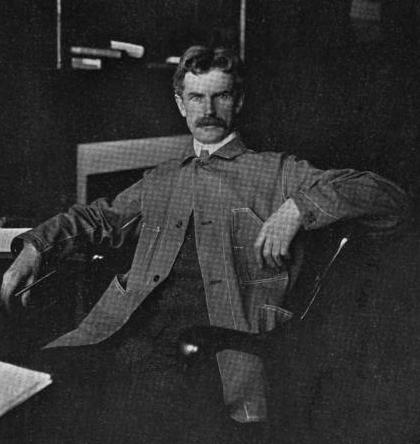
Long as depicted by The Bookman in 1907

Largely silent until then, in 1904 both Seton and Roberts made small efforts to defend their brand of nature writing from its critics, mainly Burroughs. In the preface to his new book The Watchers of the Trails, Roberts specifically responded to Burroughs' criticism by carefully pointing out that his stories were "avowedly fiction". However, he continued: "They are, at the same time, true, in that the material of which they are moulded consists of facts". Later that year, Century Magazine published Seton's only public response to Burroughs' criticisms, especially those made in the previous year's Atlantic Monthly article in which the naturalist branded Seton the originator of the faulty genre. Seton's response was in the form of a lighthearted tale about a critic named Little Mucky—obviously meant to parody Burroughs himself—who climbs a hill called Big Periodic, only to throw mud at a newcomer who attracts attention away from him. The moral of the story, Seton wrote, was that "Notoriety is a poisonous substitute for fame."

Despite the best efforts of the press, the debate began to die down in late 1904. In December that year, after suffering from ailing eyesight for several years, Long went temporarily blind at the age of 47. Despite this setback, he continued to write; in early 1905 he began publishing a series of essays in Harper's Monthly under the pseudonym Peter Rabbit; told from the point of view of the "author", the essays commented upon the human condition, animal intelligence, and the controversy first begun by Burroughs two years prior. The essays were published a year later in a collection titled Brier-Patch Philosophy. This book included the dedication: "To those who have found Their Own World to be something of a Brier-Patch the Rabbit Dedicates his little book of Cheerful Philosophy."

Burroughs continued to publicly disagree with Long and his allies, and a number of his essays dedicated to "sham nature history" were collected in the volume Ways of Nature, published in late 1905. Admitting that his authorial tone had changed since 1903, he wrote in the preface that "My readers will find this volume quite a departure in certain ways from the tone and spirit of my previous books, especially in regard to the subject of animal intelligence. Heretofore I have made the most of every gleam of intelligence of bird or four-footed beast that came under my observation, often, I fancy, making too much of it, and giving the wild creatures credit for more 'sense' than they really possessed." Mabel Osgood Wright weighed in on the debate in a 1905 essay titled "Nature as a Field for Fiction", in which she criticized both sides. Believing that nature writing could imbue animal characters with human qualities in order to better connect with the reader on an emotional level, Wright argued that nature writing should nonetheless strive to be factual and not fantastical.

Although Roberts had largely escaped criticism for his previous work, his novel Red Fox attracted attention from Burroughs and his allies after its publication in 1906. The work contains stories relating to a single animal, the eponymous Red Fox, who was described by the author as "fairly typical, both in his characteristics and in the experiences that befall him, in spite of the fact that he is stronger and cleverer than the average run of foxes." Burroughs' critique of the book began by expressing his admiration for Roberts' "genius", but again stressed his belief that animals were governed by instinct, rather than instruction or intuition. He pointed to particular passages, such as when the fox escaped a group of hounds by running across the backs of sheep on a field, as disingenuous and misleading.

== Roosevelt's involvement ==
=== Pre-1907 ===
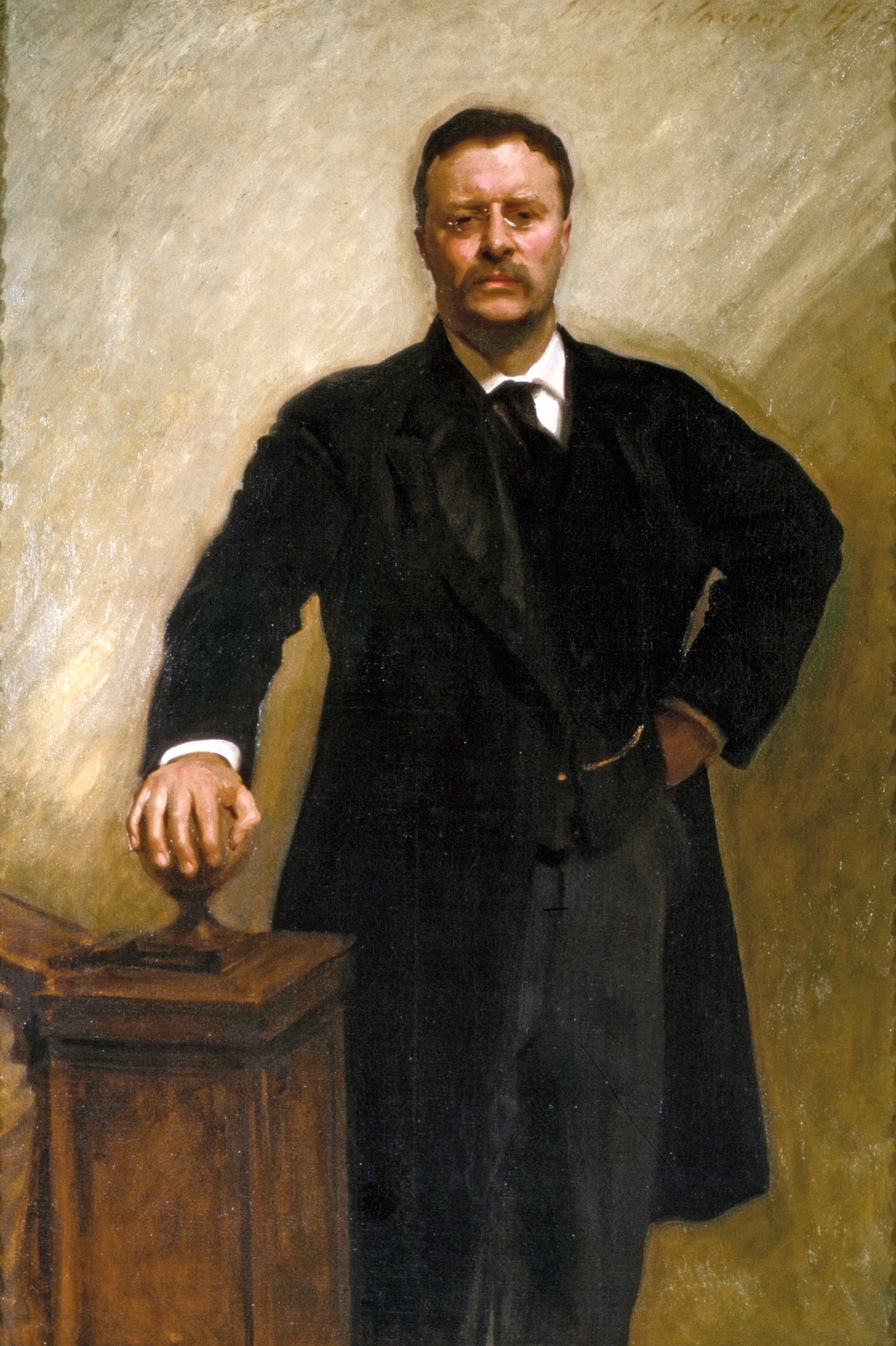
Theodore Roosevelt's official White House portrait by John Singer Sargent, 1903

President Theodore Roosevelt was a well-publicized nature-enthusiast, known for his grand hunting expeditions. While he admired the natural world and the animals who inhabited it, he believed that animals served a singular purpose: to satisfy human needs, especially in the name of progress. Roosevelt had been following the debate in newspaper articles and magazines with great interest, and as a result he became a friend and confidant of John Burroughs; shortly after Burroughs' first article condemning popular nature writers as sham naturalists, Roosevelt sent him a letter of support as well as an invitation to travel west in each other's company. In April 1903, Roosevelt and Burroughs explored Yellowstone National Park and its surrounding areas together.

In late 1905, Roosevelt received a copy of Long's book Northern Trails from the publisher. Based upon the author's travels in Canada, most of the stories involved a noble, white wolf named Wayeeses. As in other works, Long asserted that "every incident in this wolf's life, from his grasshopper hunting to the cunning caribou chase, and from the den in the rocks to the meeting of wolf and children on the storm-swept barrens, is minutely true in fact, and is based squarely upon my own observations and that of my Indians." While Roosevelt reportedly enjoyed a majority of the book—he even read it aloud to his children—he found fault with Long's dramatic description of how a wolf killed caribou by piercing the animal's heart with its teeth. "A terrific rush," Long wrote in Northern Trails, "a quick snap under the stag's chest just behind the fore legs, where the heart lay". Drawing upon his own extensive hunting experience, Roosevelt wrote confidentially to the book's publisher about Long's description being "sheer nonsense", concluding that it "is so very unusual" and anatomically impossible that it could not be true. In his letter, of which he also sent a copy to Burroughs, Roosevelt pointed out the physical difficulty a wolf would have if attempting to kill its prey in such a manner, while also commenting upon the unlikeliness of other wolf stories written by Long.

Burroughs agreed with the President's assertions, and urged him to comment publicly on the subject, although the other man demurred. When Roosevelt published Outdoor Pastimes of an American Hunter in October 1905, however, he not only dedicated it to the elder naturalist, but he also made his first public foray in what would become known as the nature fakers controversy: "I wish to express my hearty appreciation of your warfare against the sham nature-writers—those whom you have called 'the yellow journalists of the woods' ... You in your own person have illustrated what can be done by the lover of nature who has trained himself to keen observation, who describes accurately what is thus observed, and who, finally, possesses the additional gift of writing with charm and interest."

=== "Nature Fakers" ===
After four years of privately denouncing the popular nature writers in letters and conversation, Roosevelt decided to weigh in publicly; while alerting Burroughs that he had finally broken his silence, he wrote: "I know that as President I ought not to do this". He had given an interview to journalist Edward B. Clark, who quoted Roosevelt in the article "Roosevelt on the Nature Fakirs" in the June 1907 issue of Everybody's Magazine. Roosevelt not only spoke out against Long, but other authors like Jack London and Roberts, who wrote what he called "'unnatural' history". Roosevelt popularized the term "nature faker" over Clark's original spelling, and defined it in his essay as "an object of derision to every scientist worthy of the name, to every real lover of the wilderness, to every faunal naturalist, to every true hunter or nature lover. But it is evident that [the nature faker] completely deceives many good people who are wholly ignorant of wild life. Sometimes he draws on his own imagination for his fictions; sometimes he gets them second-hand from irresponsible guides or trappers or Indians." He voiced displeasure with and disbelief of London's descriptions of dog fighting in White Fang, as well as Long's stories about Wayeeses the wolf taking down prey; Roosevelt was so specific as to debate the depicted outcome of the fights based on the size of the animals involved. Long's books in particular were deemed a "genuine crime", especially against the country's children. Fearing that a curriculum including sentimental nature stories would corrupt young children, Roosevelt wrote: "As for the matter of giving these books to children for the purpose of teaching them the facts of natural history—why, it's an outrage."

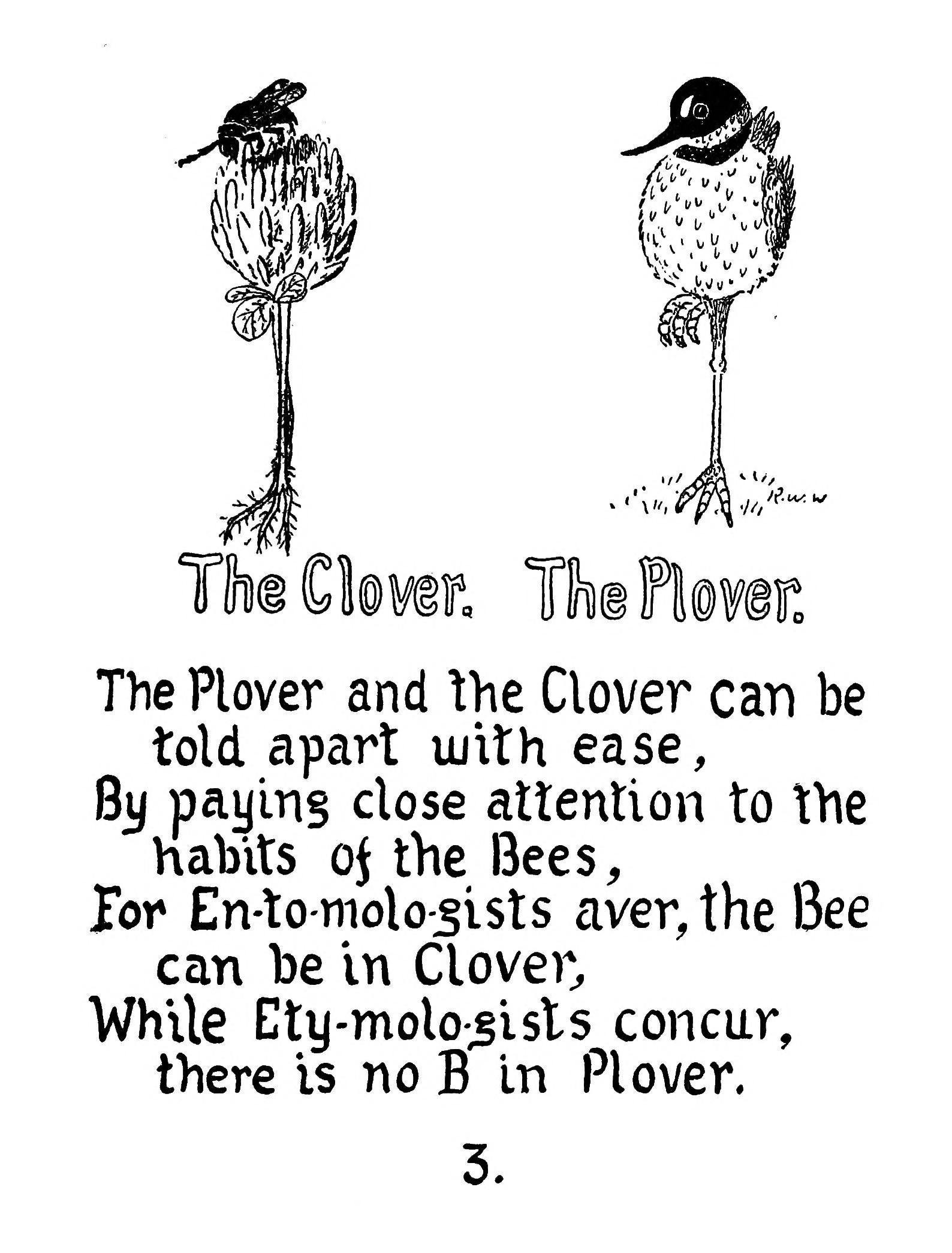
The Clover and the Plover, from Robert Williams Wood's How to Tell the Birds from the Flowers (1907)

Not long after Roosevelt's views were made public, Long responded with vigor, and the resulting publicity started the controversy anew. He began by sending a private letter to the President, which he later released to the press, informing Roosevelt that he would soon regret his "foolish words ... With all my soul I regret this necessity and shrink from it, but you have brought it upon yourself." In an interview with The New York Times, Long called Roosevelt "cowardly" and the article "venomous", but his main criticism stemmed from the President's status as a "gamekiller"; Roosevelt, Long claimed, "has no sympathy with any brand of nature study except his own." While a number of scientists wrote in support of Roosevelt and his position, Long produced several witnesses to prove his claims; to combat one of Roosevelt's specific complaints, Long provided a statement from "a full-blooded Sioux Indian" who declared that wolves in the area where Wayeeses was said to live were known to attack prey in the chest. Long also insisted that he himself had come upon the remains of a deer slain in a similar way.

Long's most effective tactic against Roosevelt, however, was not to argue biological matters, but to attack the President's motives in becoming involved in such a debate. In reference to Roosevelt's published works describing his hunting expeditions, Long wrote: "I find after carefully reading two of his big books that every time he gets near the heart of a wild thing he invariably puts a bullet through it." The Boston Globe published an article titled "President a Slayer Not Lover of Animals", while the same missive was called "Long Will Combat Roosevelt Until Latter is Whipped" in Philadelphia's Public Ledger; in it, Long wrote: "Roosevelt is a man who takes savage delight in whooping through the woods killing everything in sight." He continued, "The idea of Mr. Roosevelt assuming the part of a naturalist is absurd. He is a hunter".

Not everyone took the President's involvement in the controversy seriously; he was often included in satirical cartoons of the day, pointing to the superficial and tedious disagreements for which the writers lambasted one another. Writing in the June 8, 1907 issue of the Outlook, editor Lyman Abbot stated that Roosevelt's desire to become embroiled in such a debate stemmed from his "extraordinary vitality, coupled with his unusual interest in all that concerns human welfare" making "it very difficult for him to keep silence in the presence of anything which he thinks injurious to his fellow-men." The President's participation in the controversy attested to its magnitude, however; as one observer wrote, "From an insignificant smudge [the issue] has become a roaring blaze and its sparks are kindling throughout the land."

Roosevelt did not at first respond to Long's claims, allegedly considering the author "too small game to shoot twice." He did, however, write to Burroughs that he had "no quarrel with Mr. Long for the conclusions he draws from the facts. Our quarrel with him is because he invents the facts." Burroughs proceeded to publicly defend the President against Long's attacks, condemning him and the expert witnesses Long produced to support his claims about the events and behaviors he depicted in his works. Newspapers around the country continuously published interviews with the two naturalists, while comedic depictions of the controversy and its participants were becoming popular with readers. One such parody referred to a non-existent book called How to Tell the Animals from the Wild Flowers, including an illustration which depicted an anthropomorphic "Dandy Lion" with a cane, top hat and monocle. This joke inspired a similarly satirical book, which was published under the title How to Tell the Birds from the Flowers; a collection of humorous illustrations and poems by physicist and children's author Robert Williams Wood, the work included pairings of birds and their corresponding flowers, emphasizing their visual similarities. Making a thinly veiled reference to the much publicized controversy surrounding those authors who were now called "nature fakers", the book concludes: "I have freely drawn upon / The works of Gray and Audubon, / Avoiding though the frequent blunders / Of those who study Nature's wonders."

== End of controversy and aftermath ==
Seeing that his initial pronouncement did nothing to quell the controversy surrounding the faults of popular nature writing, Roosevelt finally responded to Long's ongoing criticism in the fall of 1907. His article, which was written under his own name and simply titled "Nature Fakers", was published in the September issue of Everybody's Magazine. Beginning with a list of nature writers that the President admired and felt best represented the genre (Burroughs, Muir, and Olive Thorne Miller, among others), he soon fell into criticizing the "yellow journalists of the woods" who "can easily believe three impossible things before breakfast; and they do not mind in the least if the impossibilities are mutually contradictory". While he focused on the "nature fakers", especially Long, he shifted the focus of his attack to place responsibility not on the authors, but on their publishers and the school boards who regularly accepted their works for reading material. He wrote:

Our quarrel is not with these men, but with those who give them their chance. We who believe in the study of nature feel that a real knowledge and appreciation of wild things, of trees, flowers, birds, and of the grim and crafty creatures of the wilderness, give an added beauty and health to life. Therefore we abhor deliberate or reckless untruth in this study as much as in any other; and therefore we feel that a grave wrong is committed by all who, holding a position that entitles them to respect, yet condone and encourage such untruth.

John Burroughs, who's a shark on birds
(He classifies 'em by a feather),
Avers that they're devoid of words
And simply cannot talk together.
He gives the nature-fakers fits
Who picture birds in conversation,
And tears their story books to bits
In scientific indignation.

But there's a wren outside my door
That talks whenever I go near him,
And talks so glibly, furthermore,
That I just wish that John could hear him.
Of mornings, when I stroll about,
The while he hymns his glad thanksgiving,
He interrupts himself to shout:
"Hey! Ain't it glorious to be living?"

— James J. Montague, "Proof"

With Roosevelt's final public word on the matter, the controversy began to die down in earnest, although its key players continued to comment on the debate's major points for the next few years. The New York Times favored the President's position in an editorial titled "The War of the Naturalists", while some still supported Long and his literary efforts. Long was traveling in Maine when Roosevelt's "Nature Fakers" article was published, and did not respond to the criticisms against him with his past vigor. He later wrote that "the only fakir in the whole controversy, in my judgment, is the big fakir at Washington". Long's literary reputation steadily declined, although he continued to write and publish well into the early 1950s. For his remaining life, Burroughs continued to write disparagingly about the effect of sentimental animal stories. In his 1908 book Leaf And Tendril, he wrote:

A great many intelligent persons tolerate or encourage our fake natural history on the ground that they find it entertaining, and that it interests the school-children in the wild life about them. Is the truth, then, without value for its own sake? What would these good people think of a United States school history that took the same liberties with facts that some of our nature writers do: that, for instance, made Washington take his army over the Delaware in balloons, or in sleighs on the solid ice with bands playing; or that made Lincoln a victim of the Evil Eye; or that portrayed his slayer as a self-sacrificing hero; or that represented the little Monitor that eventful day on Hampton Roads as diving under the Merrimac and tossing it ashore on its beak?

The nature fakers take just this kind of liberties with the facts of our natural history. The young reader finds it entertaining, no doubt, but is this sufficient justification?

Also in 1908, Jack London broke his silence on his condemnation during the controversy by publishing an essay in Collier's Weekly entitled "The Other Animals". Directly addressing Roosevelt's past criticism of his novels, London called the President "homocentric" and "an amateur." He further wrote: "I have been guilty of writing two animal-stories — two books about dogs. The writing of these two stories, on my part, was in truth a protest against the 'humanizing' of animals, of which it seemed to me several 'animal writers' had been profoundly guilty. Time and again, and many times, in my narratives, I wrote, speaking of my dog-heroes: 'He did not think these things; he merely did them,' etc. And I did this repeatedly, to the clogging of my narrative and in violation of my artistic canons; and I did it in order to hammer into the average human understanding that these dog-heroes of mine were not directed by abstract reasoning, but by instinct, sensation, and emotion, and by simple reasoning. Also, I endeavored to make my stories in line with the facts of evolution; I hewed them to the mark set by scientific research, and awoke, one day, to find myself bundled neck and crop into the camp of the nature-fakers."

Hoping to establish his credentials once and for all as an expert field naturalist, Ernest Thompson Seton spent several years of the controversy working on his two-volume work Life-Histories of Northern Animals, which was published in 1909. After an enlarged edition of the book was published as Lives of Game Animals, Seton was ironically awarded the Burroughs Medal in 1927, a prize named after the naturalist who had once so criticized Seton's work.

Over time, the term "nature faker" began to take on a new meaning; rather than describing someone who purposely told false stories about animals, it became synonymous with those who overly sentimentalized the natural world. In 1910, journalist and writer Richard Harding Davis published a short story titled "The Nature Faker" in Collier's Weekly, which used the term to refer to the lead character, Herrick, a hapless nature sentimentalist. Animation pioneer John R. Bray also showcased this new definition of "nature faker" while satirizing Roosevelt in two silent cartoons called "Colonel Heeza Liar, Nature Faker" (1915 and 1924).

The controversy had far-reaching effects in literary and scientific circles, and marked the first time that a President of the United States weighed in as a "literary and cultural critic—specifically, as an ecocritic." Though blind naturalist and author Clarence Hawkes deemed the literary debate "a veritable tempest in the teapot," after the controversy had died down he came to believe "if I ever make a bad break in regard to my natural history statements that I was doomed." The author Ralph H. Lutts wrote in his 1990 work The Nature Fakers: Wildlife, Science & Sentiment that the nature fakers controversy "was far more than a clash over the accuracy of animal stories or the question of whether animals can reason"; rather, the debate signified the changing sensibilities of writers and readers at the turn of the 20th century.
