= Clara Barrus =

American physician and author (1864–1931)

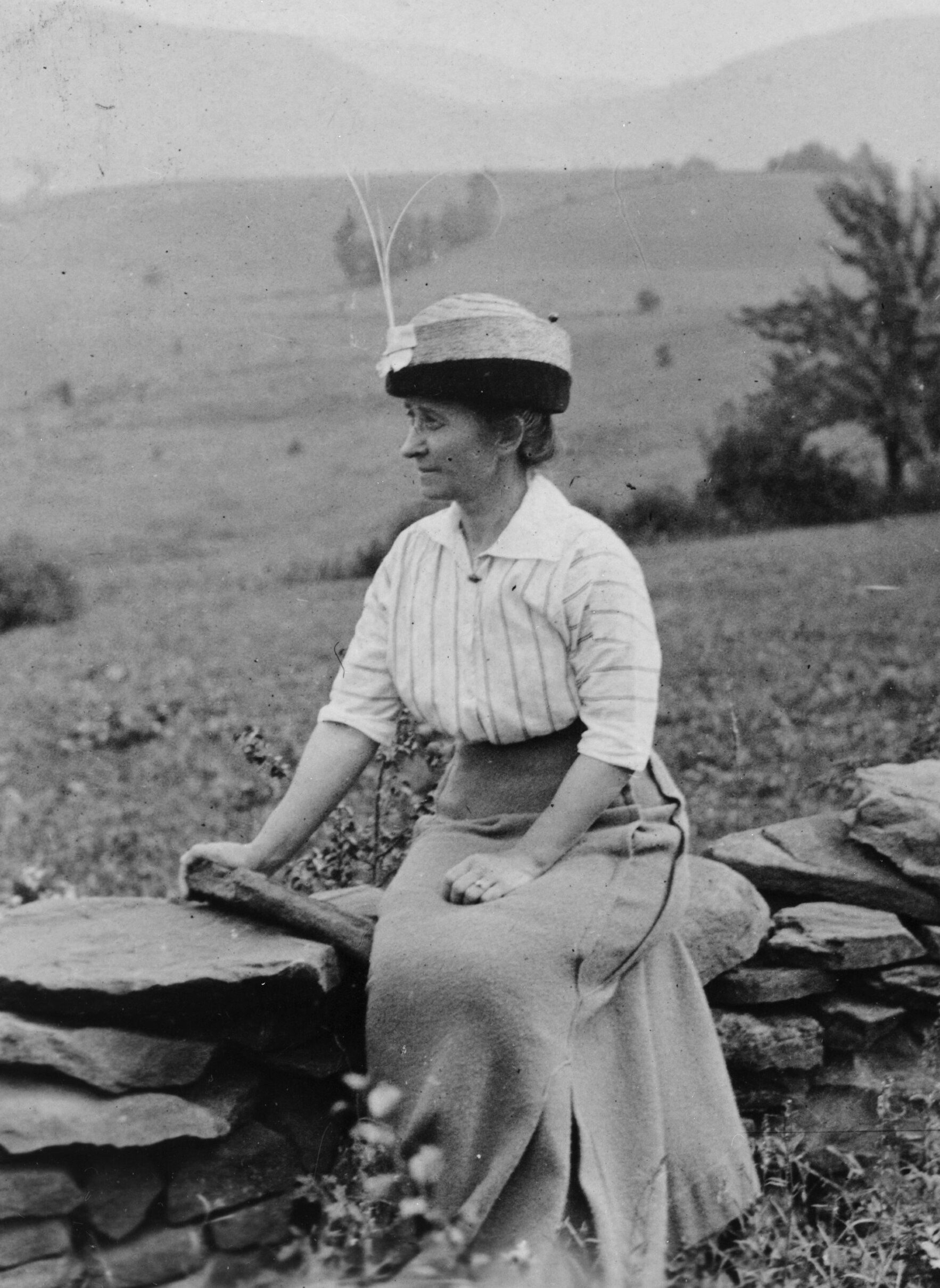
- Born: August 8, 1864; Port Byron, New York
- Died: April 4, 1931 (aged 66); Scarsdale, New York
- Education: Boston University
- Occupations: Physician and author

Clara Barrus (1864–1931) was an American physician and author. She is best known for her biography of the nature essayist John Burroughs (1837–1921).

== Biography ==
Barrus was born on August 8, 1864, in Port Byron, New York. She attended medical school at Boston University and graduated in 1888. After several years in private practice, Barrus took a job at the Middletown State Homeopathic Hospital for the Insane in 1893. She was a psychiatrist there from 1893 through 1910. She also taught at the Woman's Medical College of New York City.

In 1901 Barrus met John Burroughs and his wife Ursula North Burroughs (1836–1917). Sources describe Barrus' and John Burroughs' relationship in a variety of ways, ranging from "devoted follower", "friend, secretary, biographer, and almost constant traveling companion", to "the great love of his life". When Ursula North Burroughs died in 1917 Barrus moved into his home Riverby in Ulster County, New York. When John Burroughs died in 1921 Barrus was named Burroughs' literary executor.

During his lifetime, and after his death, Barrus wrote brochures, pamphlets, and books about Burroughs. An early work was a brochure entitled "The Retreat of a Poet Naturalist" published in 1905. Barrus edited three volumes of letters and essay from 1921 through 1928. In 1926 her official biography entitled The Life and Letters of John Burroughs was published.

Barrus was also the author of Nursing for the Insane published in 1908 by Macmillan and the autobiographical A Life Unveiled: By a Child of the Drumlins published by Doubleday in 1922.

Barrus died on April 4, 1931, in Scarsdale, New York.
