= William J. Long =

American writer, naturalist, and minister (1867 – 1952)

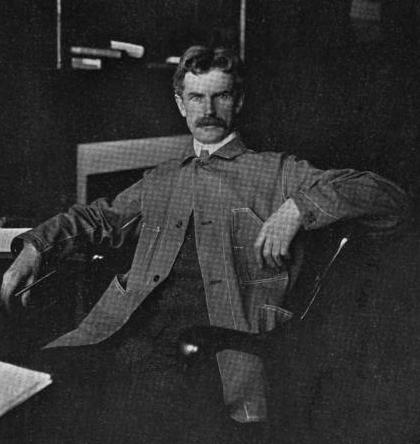
- Long as depicted by The Bookman in 1907
- Born: William Joseph Long; 3 April 1867; North Attleborough, Massachusetts, U.S.
- Died: 1952 (aged 84–85)
- Occupation: Writer
- Writing career
- Notable works: Ways of the Wood Folk; Wilderness Ways; Northern Trails

William Joseph Long (3 April 1867 – 1952) was an American writer, naturalist and minister. He lived and worked in Stamford, Connecticut as a minister of the First Congregationalist Church.

As a naturalist, he would leave Stamford every March, often with his son, Brian, and two daughters, Lois and Cesca, to travel to "the wilderness" of Maine. There they would stay until the first snows of October, although sometimes he would stay all winter. In the 1920s, he began spending his summers in Nova Scotia, claiming "the wilderness is getting too crowded".

He wrote of these wilderness experiences in the books Ways of Wood Folk, Wilderness Ways, Wood-folk Comedies, Northern Trails, Wood Folk at School, and many others. His earlier books were illustrated by Charles Copeland; two later ones were illustrated by Charles Livingston Bull. Long believed that the best way to experience the wild was to "plant yourself and sit for hours on end to let the wild come to you; and they will!"

== Controversy ==
Rev. Long's books found a large audience and were even issued in schools under the title of The Wood Folk Series. However, his findings and observations clashed with the prevailing scientific wisdom of animal behavior, which believed animals behaved purely on instinct, and could not learn from experience: a bird builds a nest purely by instinct and is not taught the skills required. Rev. Long provided many examples, supposedly from his experience, to cast doubt on that prevailing wisdom, suggesting that in fact animals did learn, and each could become individuals within their species. Some of the more famous observations were that kingfishers would catch fish in a river and then drop them into small pools so their offspring could practice catching the same fish but in an easier environment. He also chronicled a woodcock that made a "splint" for its broken leg. He also wrote of foxes that rode on the backs of sheep to escape hunters and porcupines curling into balls and rolling down hills.

All this led to a belief that Rev. Long (and others) were anthropomorphizing animal behavior, blurring the lines between the animal world and humans. This came to a head when President Teddy Roosevelt's naturalist adviser, John Burroughs, accused Rev. Long (and others) of gross exaggeration, if not outright lies, regarding his books and the reflections of nature therein. Roosevelt wrote "If he stated that he had seen a weasel kill a deer and then carry it to the top of a pine tree, I would not care how many affidavits he produced, because the feat would be mechanically impossible." Long thus found himself at the center of the nature fakers controversy of the early 1900s. Ultimately Burroughs claimed Rev. Long was trying to sell books to gullible readers with such lies and President Theodore Roosevelt himself had Rev. Long's books taken from all school libraries.

The local Stamford paper chronicled the feud with "our dashing Rev. Long". Rev. Long would counter that you cannot "understand nature when you have a gun on your hip, ride on top of a wagon or horseback, and have a crowd of twenty with you," taking aim at Teddy Roosevelt's much publicized and photographed forays into nature. He went so far to state Roosevelt "never met an animal he didn't kill." After a couple months back and forth in the Stamford and national papers, Rev. Long said that "while obviously we cannot settle this through the media, I invite President Roosevelt anytime to Stamford to settle this like men." Roosevelt never accepted his invitation.

Historian Ralph H. Lutts has argued that Long was "an experienced woodsman and close observer of nature" who did not intentionally fabricate his observations but sometimes misinterpreted what he saw. Long rejected Darwinism and the idea of struggle for existence. He believed that all animal minds were reflections of God and relied on empathy to understand animal psychology.

== Bibliography ==
- The Making of Zimri Bunker: A Story of Nantucket in the Early Days (1899), illustrated by B. Rosenmeyer
- Ways of Wood Folk (1899), illustrated by Charles Copeland
- Wilderness Ways (1900), illustrated by Charles Copeland
- Beasts of the Field (1901), illustrated by Charles Copeland
- Fowls of the Air (1901), illustrated by Charles Copeland
- Secrets of the Woods (1901), illustrated by Charles Copeland
- School of the Woods: Some life studies of animal instincts and animal training (1902), illustrated by Charles Copeland
- Wood Folk at School (1903), illustrated by Charles Copeland
- A Little Brother to the Bear and Other Animal Studies (1903), illustrated by Charles Copeland
- Following the Deer (1903), illustrated by Charles Copeland
- Northern Trails (1905), illustrated by Charles Copeland
- Brier-Patch Philosophy, by "Peter Rabbit" (1906), illustrated by Charles Copeland
- Whose Home Is the Wilderness: Some Studies of Wild Animal Life (1907), illustrated by Charles Copeland
- Outlines of English Literature (1917)
- How Animals Talk: And Other Pleasant Studies of Birds and Beasts (1919), illustrated by Charles Copeland
- Wood-folk Comedies: The Play of Wild-Animal Life on a Natural Stage (1920), illustrated by Charles Livingston Bull
- Mother Nature: A Study of Animal Life and Death (1923), illustrated by Charles Livingston Bull
- The Spirit of the Wild: Observations in the Animal World (1956), illustrated by Ray Houlihan
- Wings of the Forest (1957), illustrated by Ray Houlihan

=== Reissues ===
- Northern Trails (1905), 390pp., was reissued in two volumes as:
  - Wayeeses the White Wolf (1907), 128pp.
  - Stories from Northern Trails (1908), 158pp.

=== Wood Folk Series ===
- Ways of Wood Folk (1899)
- Wilderness Ways (1900)
- Secrets of the Woods (1901)
- Wood Folk at School (1903)
- A Little Brother to the Bear and Other Animal Studies. Wood Folk Series Book V (1904) 178pp. (shortened version of the 280pp. 1903 edition)
- Northern Trails Book 1. Wood Folk Series Book VI (1908) 128pp. (same content as Wayeeses the White Wolf)
- Northern Trails Book II Wood Folk Series Book VII (1908) 158pp. (same content as Stories from Northern Trails)
