= Lois Long =

American writer (1901–1974)

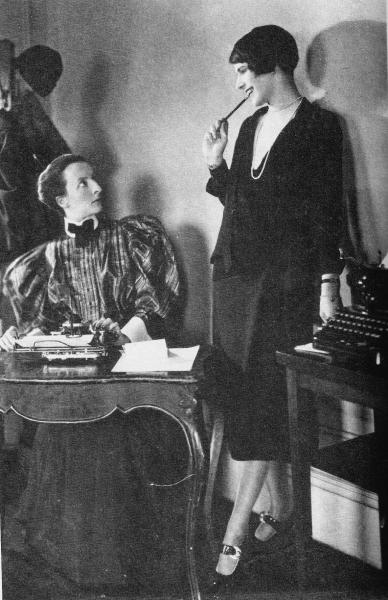
- Lois Long (right), early 1920s
- Born: December 15, 1901; Stamford, Connecticut, US
- Died: July 29, 1974 (aged 72); Saratoga, New York, US
- Education: Vassar College (AB)
- Occupation: Journalist for The New Yorker
- Spouses: Peter Arno (1927–1931); Major Harold A. Fox (m. 1957)
- Children: 1

Lois Bancroft Long (December 15, 1901 – July 29, 1974) was an American writer for The New Yorker during the 1920s. She was known under the pseudonym "Lipstick" and as the epitome of a flapper.

She was born on December 15, 1901, in Stamford, Connecticut, the oldest of three children of Frances Bancroft and William J. Long. She graduated from Vassar College. Long had worked at Vogue and Vanity Fair before finding fame at The New Yorker. Harold Ross hired her to write a column on New York nightlife. Under the name of Lipstick, Lois Long chronicled her nightly escapades of drinking, dining, and dancing. She wrote of the decadence of the decade with an air of aplomb, wit, and satire, becoming quite a celebrity. Because her readers did not know who she was, Long often jested in her columns about being a "short squat maiden of forty" or a "kindly, old, bearded gentleman." However, in the announcement of her marriage to The New Yorker cartoonist Peter Arno, she revealed her true identity. Ralph Ingersoll, the magazine's managing editor from 1925 to 1930, wrote that Long “combined two rare ingredients: an ability to be perpetually stimulated, blended with an ability to be perpetually critical.”

She remained with The New Yorker as a columnist until 1968. She died in 1974.

== Biography ==
=== School years ===
Lois graduated from Stamford High School and entered Vassar College in 1918. Already displaying a drive for literary excellence and exploration, she graduated from Vassar in 1922 with a degree in English. In college, she began growing herself a modest reputation as a journalist, writing a review of "Vassar Dramatics" to the Poughkeepsie Courier in June of her senior year as well as participating as an editor in 1922's Vassarian. In addition to making herself known through the school's written publications, Long occasionally participated in the institution's theatre program.

=== Personal life ===
In 1927, cartoonist Peter Arno and Lois Long got married. The marriage lasted four years, then in 1930 Long filed for divorce. The divorce was granted and the two shared custody of their daughter, Patricia.

=== Career ===
At 23, Long was paid to review the speakeasies of New York. Her witty, satirical column was called "When Nights Are Bold," the title of which changed to "Tables for Two" with the issue for September 12, 1925 and ran until June 6, 1931. In addition to her observations on the patrons of speakeasies, it also included criticism of public officials, such as Manhattan District Attorney Emory R. Buckner, who conducted raids on speakeasies. As the archetypal flapper, Long's columns offered women a glimpse of a glamorous lifestyle where they could enjoy many of the same freedoms and vices as men. This new liberty was prompted by women gaining the right to vote in the United States in 1920 as well as the ways in which they defied the Victorian and Edwardian roles proscribed for women.

Her comment "I like music, and informality, and gaiety" is the epitome of the flapper mindset and what some critics felt were the sexual and moral failings of flappers in the Roaring Twenties.

Different though they were, she and Ross managed to work together—and knew when, and how, to accommodate the other. Zeitz notes that Long's cubicle was originally on the other side of the building from her assistant, and after growing tired of running back and forth to exchange information, they made the trip on roller skates. In time, Ross grew exasperated and gave them offices next to one another to spare himself and the other journalists such antics.

Throughout her career, Long's work appeared in numerous formats, and in 1928, she was recruited by the editor and screenwriter, Gene Fowler, to contribute, along with Ben Hecht, Ring Lardner, Westbrook Pegler, and Walter Winchell, to The New York Morning Telegraph, and in 1936 Long was, for a short time, under contract to Paramount Pictures.

She was considered the expert on New York's nightlife. Upon her death, William Shawn, editor of The New Yorker said that "Lois Long invented fashion criticism," adding that she "was the first American fashion critic to approach fashion as an art and to criticize women's clothes with independence, intelligence, humor and literary style."

== Later life ==
Long married US Air Force Major Harold A. Fox in 1957. Long died of lung cancer aged 72 and is buried in Easton Cemetery, Pennsylvania.

== Bibliography ==
- L. L. (January 2, 1926). "[Untitled column]". On and Off the Avenue. The New Yorker. 1 (46): 26–27.
- Lipstick (January 2, 1926). "[Untitled column]". Tables for Two. The New Yorker. 1 (46): 28–29.
- Long, Lois (January 1, 1949). "Feminine fashions". On and Off the Avenue. The New Yorker. 24 (45): 44–48.
- — (January 15, 1949). "Feminine fashions". On and Off the Avenue. The New Yorker. 24 (47): 64–68.
- — (February 4, 1950). "Feminine fashions". On and Off the Avenue. The New Yorker. 25 (50): 64–68.
