= Old Clump Mountain =

Mountain in New York, United States

Coordinates: 42°18′39″N 74°38′07″W

Old Clump Mountain is a summit in the Catskills in the towns of Stamford and Roxbury in Delaware County, New York.

Its latitude and longitude are 42°18'39" North, 074°38'07" West. Elevation 2,926 feet.

It is the location of the registered National Historic Landmark of the birthplace, boyhood and summer homes, and burial site of American naturalist and writer John Burroughs.

== Sources ==
- Geographic Names Information System, USGS
- Town of Roxbury, N.Y.
