= Burroughs Creek =

Stream in Missouri, United States

Coordinates: 38°38′28″N 90°21′06″W

Burroughs Creek is a stream in St. Louis County in the U.S. state of Missouri. The 1-mile (1.6 km) long stream is a tributary to Black Creek.

Burroughs Creek is named after John Burroughs (1837–1921), an American naturalist and nature essayist.
