= Curtis Arnoux Peters =

Former New York Supreme Court Justice

Curtis Arnoux Peters (22 August 1879 − December 17, 1933) was a New York Supreme Court Justice.

Peters worked for thirteen years in New York City's Law Department as an Assistant Corporation Counsel. He was the campaign manager for Thomas Crain's election to the New York Supreme Court in 1924. He was elected to the First Judicial District as a Democrat in 1926, but died halfway through his fourteen-year term. He was married to Charlotte L. Curtis; Peter Arno, the cartoonist, was his son, and the couple also had a daughter, Constance L. Curtis.
