= John Burroughs Association =

Organization

Coordinates: 40.780555°N 73.973772°W

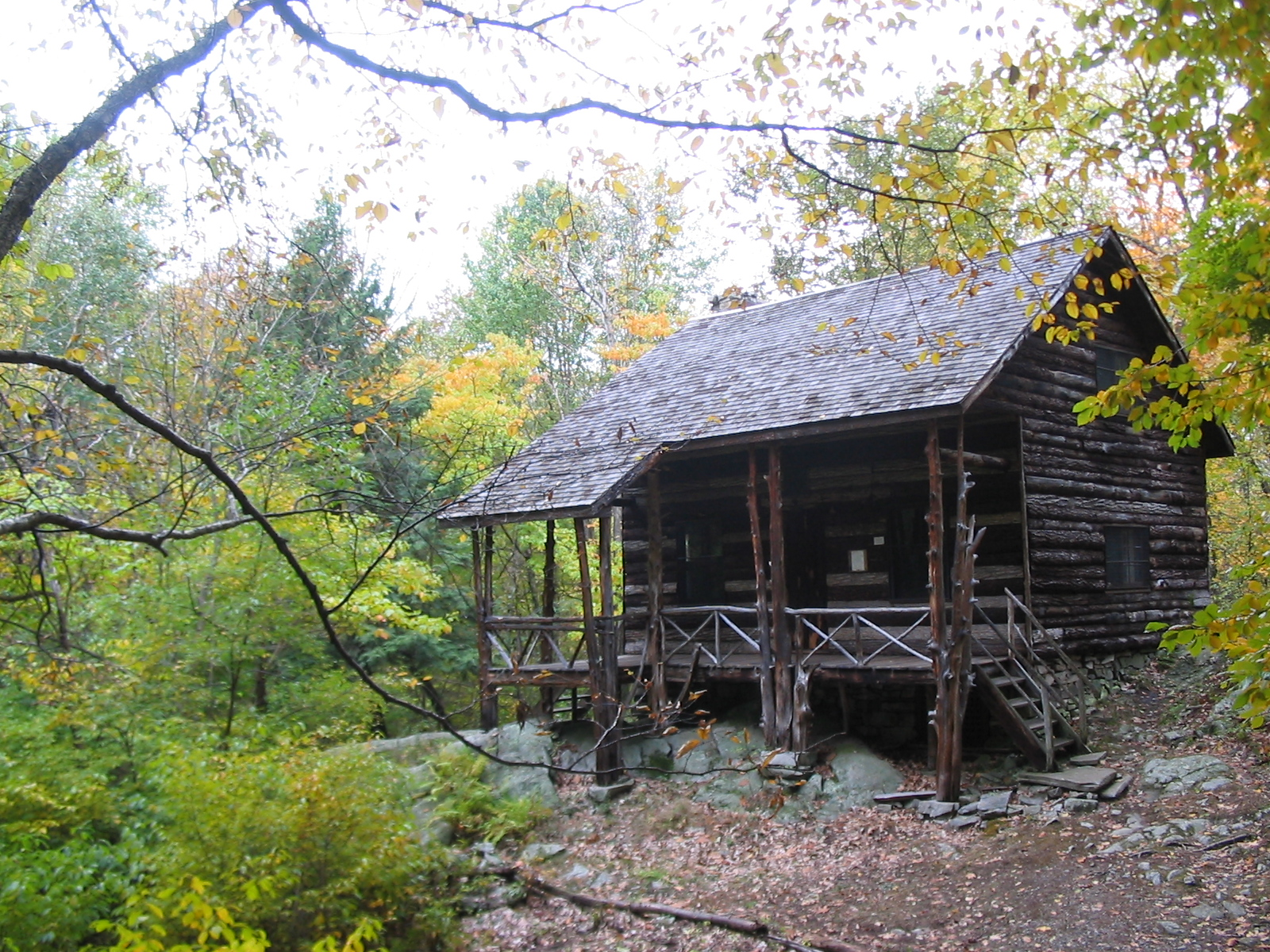
Slabsides, Burrough's cabin in West Park, NY, 2005

The John Burroughs Association was founded in 1921 to commemorate the life and works of author/naturalist John Burroughs (1837-1921). Administered out of offices at the American Museum of Natural History, the Association owns the John Burroughs Sanctuary at West Park, in the town of Esopus, New York. The Sanctuary is the site of John Burroughs's cabin, Slabsides, a National Historic Landmark built 1895. In addition to maintaining the Sanctuary, the John Burroughs Association publishes a newsletter, The Wake Robin. It also, on an annual basis, presents the John Burroughs Medal for distinguished nature writing at book-length, and another award for essay-length nature writing.
