= Peter Arno =

American cartoonist (1904–1968)

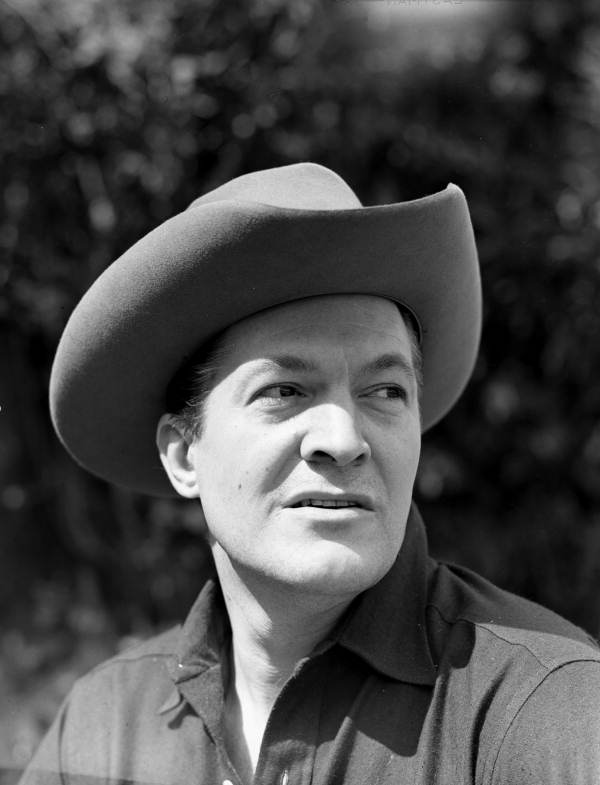
- Peter Arno in 1942
- Born: Curtis Arnoux Peters, Jr. January 8, 1904; New York City, US
- Died: February 22, 1968 (aged 64); Port Chester, New York, US
- Education: Yale University; Hotchkiss School
- Occupation: Cartoonist
- Employer: The New Yorker (1925–1968)
- Known for: Created 99 covers for The New Yorker
- Spouses: Lois Long (m. 1927–1931) Mary Livingston Lansing (m. 1935–1939)
- Children: Patricia Arno

Curtis Arnoux Peters, Jr. (January 8, 1904 – February 22, 1968), known professionally as Peter Arno, was an American cartoonist. He contributed cartoons and 101 covers to The New Yorker from 1925, the magazine's first year, until 1968, the year of his death. In 2015, New Yorker contributor Roger Angell described him as "the magazine's first genius".

== Biography ==
Arno was born on January 8, 1904, in New York City. His father was Curtis Arnoux Peters, a New York State Supreme Court judge. He was educated at the Hotchkiss School and Yale University, where he contributed illustrations, covers and cartoons to The Yale Record, the campus humor magazine, as "Peters". He also formed a jazz band called the Yale Collegians, in which he played piano, banjo, and accordion. Arno's infatuation with show business later had him designing, writing, and/or producing for four Broadway shows, and appearing with fellow cartoonists in the film Artists and Models. (Please see Role in Broadway Productions below)

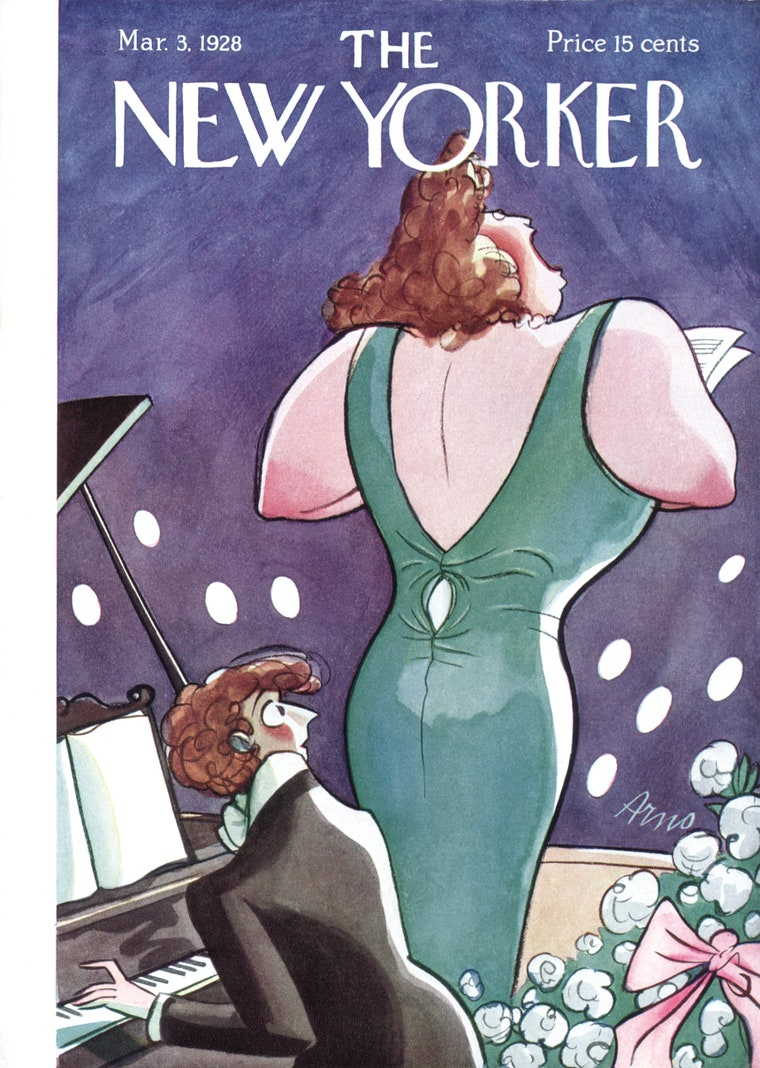
March 3, 1928 cover of The New Yorker by Arno

After one year at Yale he moved home to Manhattan and worked as an illustrator for a silent film company (Chadwick Films) before joining the staff of the fledgling magazine The New Yorker. The iconic cartoons and covers he created there, from 1925 through 1968, helped establish the magazine's reputation for sophisticated humor and fine illustration. His work often depicted a cross-section of New York City society, though he was also inspired by situations he encountered during his travels. Arno drew his cartoons in batches, usually over a two-day period each week. Arno often worked with gag writers, one of whom coined the popular expression "back to the drawing board" in a famous March 1, 1941 cartoon.

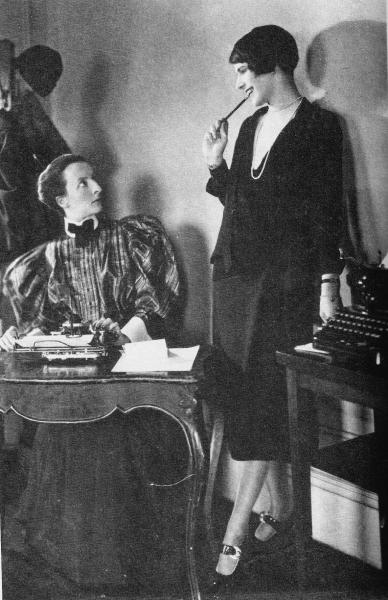
Lois Long aka "Lipstick" in the 1920s

In 1927 he married Lois Long, a popular New Yorker columnist and fashion editor who wrote under the pseudonym "Lipstick." Their one daughter, Patricia, was born September 18, 1928, and the couple divorced in 1930. Arno later married debutante Mary Livingston Lansing in August 1935; they divorced in July 1939.

After his second divorce, Arno moved to a farm near Harrison, New York, where he lived in seclusion, enjoying music, guns, and sports cars.

Arno died of emphysema on February 22, 1968, at the age of 64. He is buried at Kensico Cemetery in Valhalla, New York.

A biography, Peter Arno: The Mad Mad World of The New Yorker's Greatest Cartoonist by New Yorker cartoonist, Michael Maslin was published in April 2016 by Regan Arts.

== Role in Broadway Productions ==
Title	Year	Role
Hear Goes the Bride	1931	Producer Scenery Sketches Book
Shoot the Works	1931	Book
The New Yorkers	1930	Scenic Design sketches Costume Design Based on his story
Murray Anderson's Almanac	1929	Book

Note: Book is theatrical term for production script

== Bibliography ==
- Whoops, Dearie!. New York: Simon & Schuster, 1927. (ghostwritten by Philip Wylie)
- Parade. New York: H. Liveright, 1929.
- Hullabaloo. New York: H. Liveright, 1930.
- Circus. New York: H. Liveright, 1931.
- Favorites. New York: Blue Ribbon Books, 1932.
- For Members Only. New York: Simon & Schuster, 1935.
- Cartoon Revue. New York: Simon & Schuster, 1941.
- Man in the Shower. New York: Simon & Schuster, 1944.
- Sizzling Platter. New York: Simon & Schuster, 1949.
- Ladies and Gentlemen. New York: Simon & Schuster, 1951.
- Hell of a Way to Run a Railroad. New York: Simon & Schuster, 1956.
- Lady in the Shower. New York: Simon & Schuster, 1967.
- Peter Arno. New York: Dodd, Mead, 1979.
