= Ernest William Hawkes =

American anthropologist

Ernest William Hawkes (July 19, 1883 – March 13, 1957) was an American anthropologist best known for his work studying the indigenous peoples of Alaska and northern Canada. A native of Ashfield, Massachusetts, Hawkes was the brother of the well-known "blind naturist" Clarence Hawkes. E. W. Hawkes studied at Dakota Wesleyan University (1909) and University of Pennsylvania (1913, 1915).

Over the course of multiple trips to Alaska and northern Canada, Hawkes gathered data for his books. His 1914 publication Dance Festivals of the Alaskan Eskimo was based on the three years Hawkes spent in the Bering Strait District, including on the Diomede Islands and at St. Michael. It was while stationed at St. Michael as a government teacher over the winter of 1911-1912 that Hawkes observed the traditional Inuit "Messenger Feast", which he recounted in his 1913 Inviting In. His 1916 The Labrador Eskimo was based on his experiences in summer 1914 with the Geological Survey of Canada in the Hudson Bay area.

Hawkes held a variety of university fellowships in Anthropology, including Columbia University (1913–1914), Harrison College (1914–1916), and later Glendale Community College in Glendale, California.

He died in Los Angeles in 1957.

== Selected works ==
- Transforming the Eskimo Into a Herder: An Account of the Reindeer Industry in Alaska (1913)
- The dance festivals of the Alaskan Eskimo (1914)
- A pre-Lenape site in New Jersey (1916)
- The Labrador Eskimo (1916)
- Skeletal Measurements and Observations on the Point Barrow Eskimo with Comparisons with Other Eskimo Groups (1916)
