= Woodchuck Lodge =

Historic house in New York, United States

- U.S. National Register of Historic Places
- U.S. National Historic Landmark
- New York State Register of Historic Places
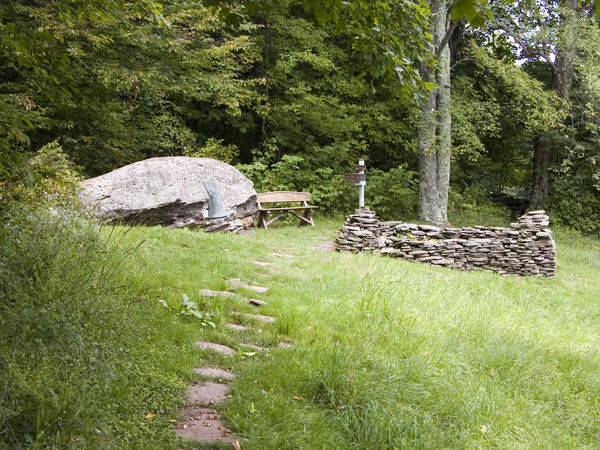
- Boyhood rock and grave of John Burroughs

- Location within New York Location within the United States
- Location: Burroughs Road, Roxbury, NY
- Coordinates: 42°17′47.18″N 74°35′2.52″W
- Area: 25 acres (10 ha)
- Built: 1908
- Architect: Curtis Burroughs
- NRHP reference No.: 66000512
- NYSRHP No.: 02515.000170

Significant dates
- Added to NRHP: October 15, 1966
- Designated NHL: December 29, 1962
- Designated NYSRHP: June 23, 1980

Woodchuck Lodge is a historic house on Burroughs Memorial Road in a remote part of the western Catskills in Roxbury, New York. Built in the mid-19th century, it was the last home of naturalist and writer John Burroughs (1837–1921) from 1908, and is the place of his burial. The property is now managed by the state of New York as the John Burroughs Memorial State Historic Site, and the house is open for tours on weekends between May and October. The property is a National Historic Landmark, designated in 1962 for its association with Burroughs, one of the most important nature writers of the late 19th and early 20th centuries.

== Description and history ==
Woodchuck Lodge is located in a rural setting on the north side of Burroughs Memorial Road, about 2 miles (3.2 km) west of the village of Roxbury. It includes about 25 acres (10 ha) of land, including woods, fields, the main house, and a large rock on which Burroughs played as a child, and where his grave is located. The lodge is an L-shaped wood-frame structure, with a two-story gabled section on the left and a single-story gabled ell extending to the right. The front roof face of the ell extends forward over a porch the spans the ell and the rightmost bay of the left section, where the entrance is located. There are modest Greek Revival features, including pilasters flanking the main entrance, but also rustic features, such as the posts supporting the porch.

The lodge was built about 1863 by John Burroughs' brother Curtis, on the land where they had grown up (the original family homestead lies west of the lodge). Burroughs rented it from Curtis' son in 1910 and 1911 for the summer, and then purchased it outright in 1913. Burroughs died in 1921, and the property was purchased by Henry Ford the following year. In 1947 he returned the property to the Burroughs family, except for the field containing the boyhood rock and grave, which he gave to the state. The lodge remained a private residence, sometimes for summer use and sometimes year-round, until 1975, when it was acquired by a nonprofit organization. It is now also owned by the state as part of the historic site.

== See also ==
- List of National Historic Landmarks in New York
- List of New York State Historic Sites
- National Register of Historic Places listings in Delaware County, New York
- Riverby
- Slabsides
