= John Burroughs =

American naturalist and essayist (1837–1921)

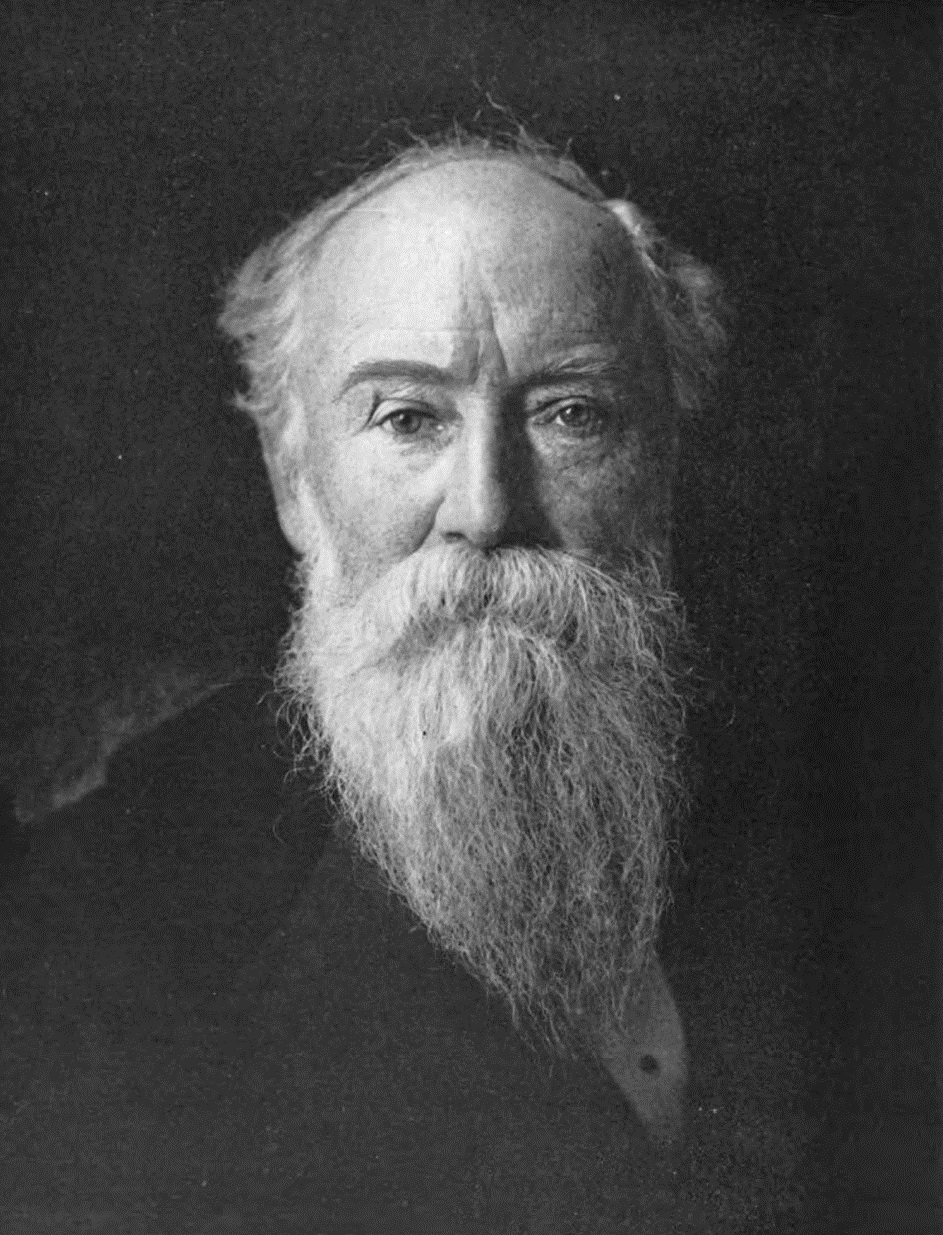
- Burroughs in 1906
- Born: April 3, 1837; Roxbury, New York, U.S.
- Died: March 29, 1921 (aged 83); Kingsville, Ohio, U.S.
- Occupations: Naturalist and conservationist
- Spouse: Ursula North (m. 1857)

John Burroughs (April 3, 1837 – March 29, 1921) was an American naturalist and nature essayist, active in the conservation movement in the United States. The first of his essay collections was Wake-Robin in 1871.

In the words of his biographer Edward Renehan, Burroughs' special identity was less that of a scientific naturalist than that of "a literary naturalist with a duty to record his own unique perceptions of the natural world." The result was a body of work whose resonance with the tone of its cultural moment explains both its popularity at that time, and its relative obscurity since.

== Early life and marriage ==
Burroughs was the seventh of Chauncy and Amy Kelly Burroughs' ten children. He was born on the family farm in the Catskill Mountains, near Roxbury in Delaware County, New York. As a child he spent many hours on the slopes of Old Clump Mountain, looking off to the east and the higher peaks of the Catskills, especially Slide Mountain, which he would later write about. As he labored on the family farm he was captivated by the return of the birds each spring and other wildlife around the family farm including frogs and bumblebees. In his later years he credited his life as a farm boy for his subsequent love of nature and feeling of kinship with all rural things.

During his teen years Burroughs showed a keen interest in learning. Among Burroughs's classmates was future financier Jay Gould. Burroughs' father believed the basic education provided by the local school was enough and refused to support the young Burroughs when he asked for money to pay for the books or the higher education he wanted. At the age of 17 Burroughs left home to earn funds needed for college by teaching at a school in Olive, New York.

From 1854 to 1856 Burroughs alternated periods of teaching with periods of study at higher education institutions including Cooperstown Seminary. He left the Seminary and completed his studies in 1856. He continued teaching until 1863. In 1857 Burroughs left a teaching position in the village of Buffalo Grove in Illinois to seek employment closer to home, drawn back by "the girl I left behind me." On September 12, 1857, Burroughs married Ursula North (1836–1917). Burroughs later became an atheist with an inclination towards pantheism.

== Career ==
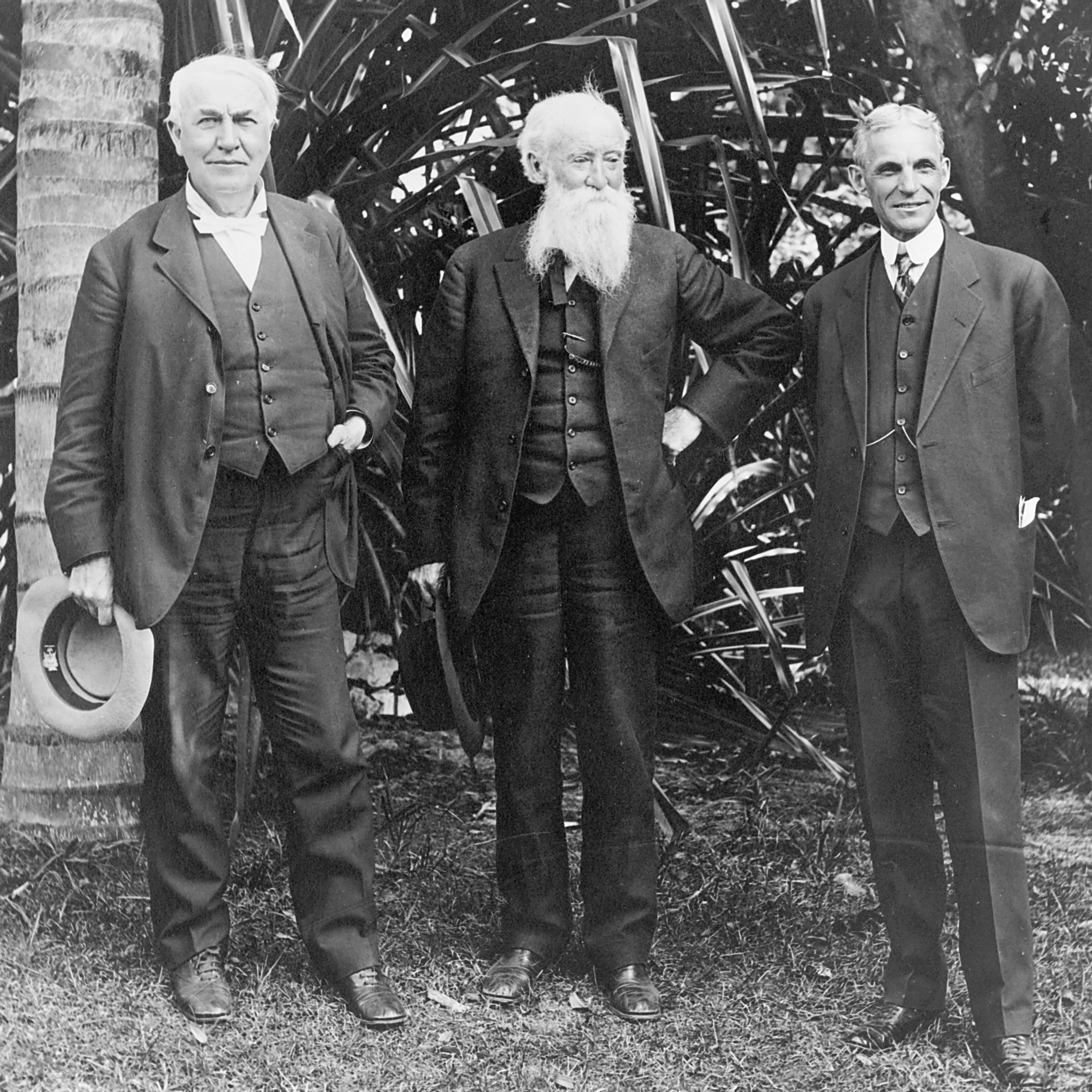
Burroughs poses with Thomas Edison and Henry Ford at Edison's home in Ft. Myers, Florida, 1914.

Burroughs had his first break as a writer in the summer of 1860 when the Atlantic Monthly, then a fairly new publication, accepted his essay Expression. Editor James Russell Lowell found the essay so similar to Emerson's work that he initially thought Burroughs had plagiarized his longtime acquaintance. Poole's Index and Hill's Rhetoric, both periodical indexes, even credited Emerson as the author of the essay.

In 1864, Burroughs accepted a position as a clerk at the Treasury; he would eventually become a federal bank examiner, continuing in that profession into the 1880s. All the while, he continued to publish essays, and grew interested in the poetry of Walt Whitman. Burroughs met Whitman in Washington, D.C., in November 1863, and the two became close friends.

Whitman encouraged Burroughs to develop his nature writing as well as his philosophical and literary essays. In 1867, Burroughs published Notes on Walt Whitman as Poet and Person, the first biography and critical work on the poet, which was extensively (and anonymously) revised and edited by Whitman himself before publication. Four years later, the Boston house of Hurd & Houghton published Burroughs's first collection of nature essays, Wake-Robin.

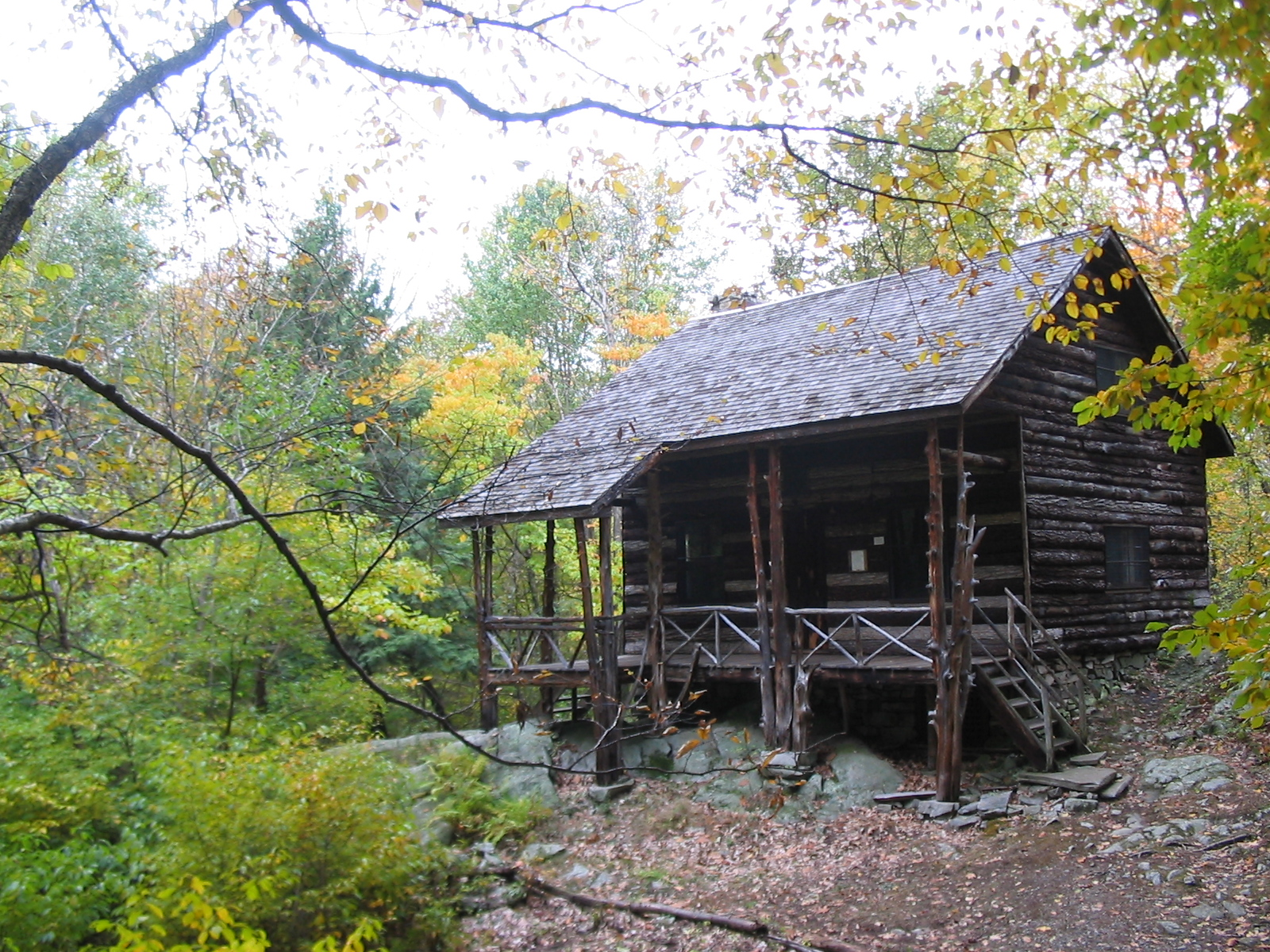
A 2005 photograph of Slabsides, Burroughs's cabin in West Park, NY; the cabin was designated a National Historic Landmark in 1968.

In January 1873, Burroughs left Washington for New York. The next year he bought a 9-acre (3.6 ha) farm in West Park, NY (now part of the Town of Esopus) where he built his Riverby estate. There he grew various crops before eventually focusing on table grapes. He continued to write, and continued as a federal bank examiner for several more years. In 1895 Burroughs bought additional land near Riverby where he and son Julian constructed an Adirondack-style cabin that he called "Slabsides". He wrote, grew celery, and entertained visitors there, including students from local Vassar College. After the turn of the 20th century, Burroughs renovated an old farmhouse near his birthplace and called it "Woodchuck Lodge." This became his summer residence until his death.

Burroughs accompanied many personalities of the time in his later years, including Theodore Roosevelt, John Muir, Henry Ford (who gave him an automobile, one of the first in the Hudson Valley), Harvey Firestone, and Thomas Edison. In 1899, he participated in E. H. Harriman's expedition to Alaska.

According to Ford, "John Burroughs, Edison, and I with Harvey S. Firestone made several vagabond trips together. We went in motor caravans and slept under canvas. Once, we gypsied through the Adirondacks and again through the Alleghenies, heading southward."

In 1901, Burroughs met an admirer, Clara Barrus (1864–1931). She was a physician with the state psychiatric hospital in Middletown, New York. Clara was 37 and nearly half his age. She was the great love of his life and ultimately his literary executrix. She moved into his house after Ursula died in 1917. She published Whitman and Burroughs: Comrades in 1931, relying on firsthand accounts and letters to documents Burroughs' friendship with poet Walt Whitman.

=== Nature fakers controversy ===
In 1903, after publishing an article entitled "Real and Sham Natural History" in the Atlantic Monthly, Burroughs began a widely publicized literary debate known as the nature fakers controversy. Attacking popular writers of the day such as Ernest Thompson Seton, Charles G. D. Roberts and William J. Long for their fantastical representations of wildlife, he also denounced the booming genre of "naturalistic" animal stories as "yellow journalism of the woods". The controversy lasted for four years and involved American environmental and political figures of the day, including President Theodore Roosevelt, who was friends with Burroughs.

== Writing ==
Many of Burroughs' essays first appeared in popular magazines. He is best known for his observations on birds, flowers and rural scenes, but his essay topics also range to religion, philosophy, and literature. Burroughs was a staunch defender of Walt Whitman and Ralph Waldo Emerson, but somewhat critical of Henry David Thoreau, even while praising many of Thoreau's qualities. His achievements as a writer were confirmed by his election as a member of the American Academy of Arts and Letters.

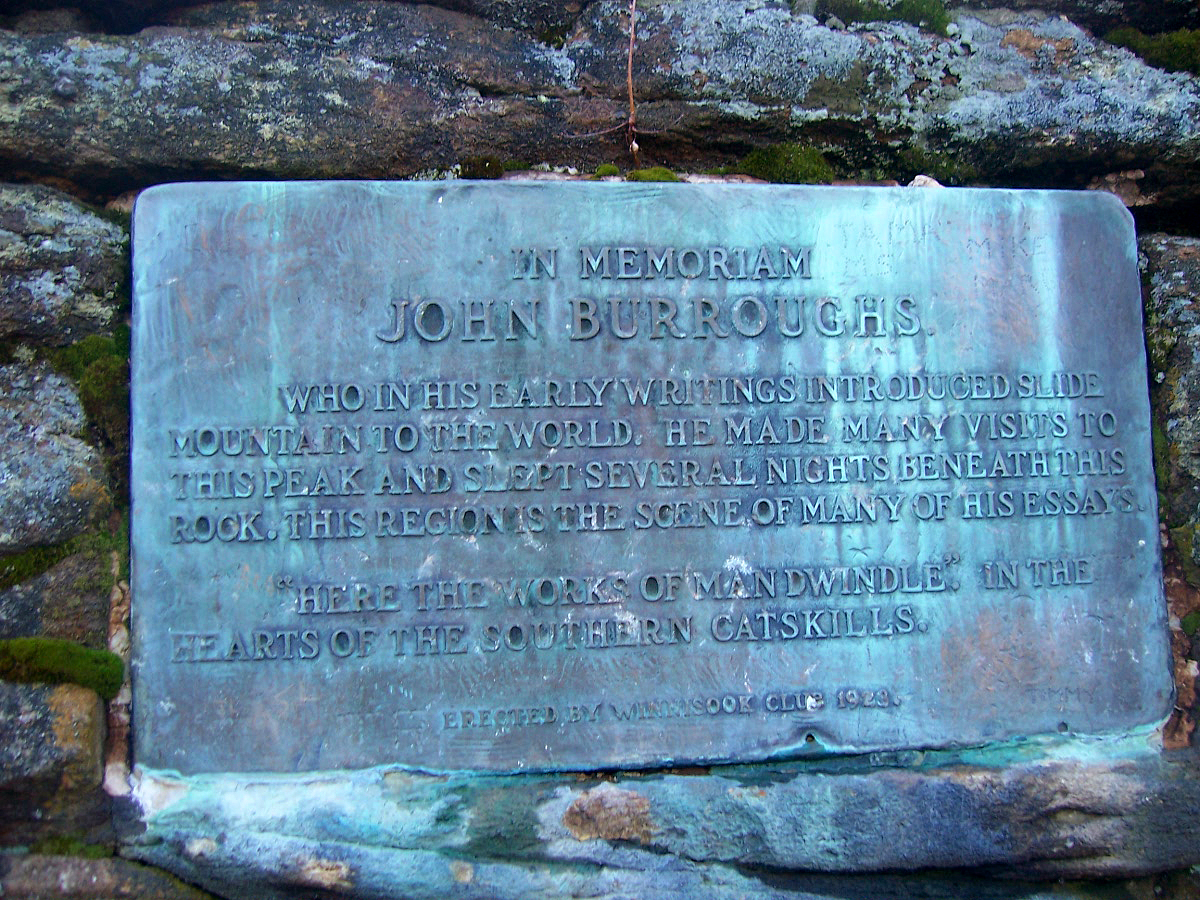
Plaque quoting Burroughs near the summit of Slide Mountain

Some of Burroughs' essays came out of trips back to his native Catskills. In the late 1880s, in the essay "The Heart of the Southern Catskills," he chronicled an ascent of Slide Mountain, the highest peak of the Catskills range. Speaking of the view from the summit, he wrote: "The works of man dwindle, and the original features of the huge globe come out. Every single object or point is dwarfed; the valley of the Hudson is only a wrinkle in the earth's surface. You discover with a feeling of surprise that the great thing is the earth itself, which stretches away on every hand so far beyond your ken." The first sentence of this quote is now on a plaque commemorating Burroughs at the mountain's summit, on a rock outcrop known as Burroughs Ledge. Slide and neighboring Cornell and Wittenberg mountains, which he also climbed, have been collectively named the Burroughs Range.

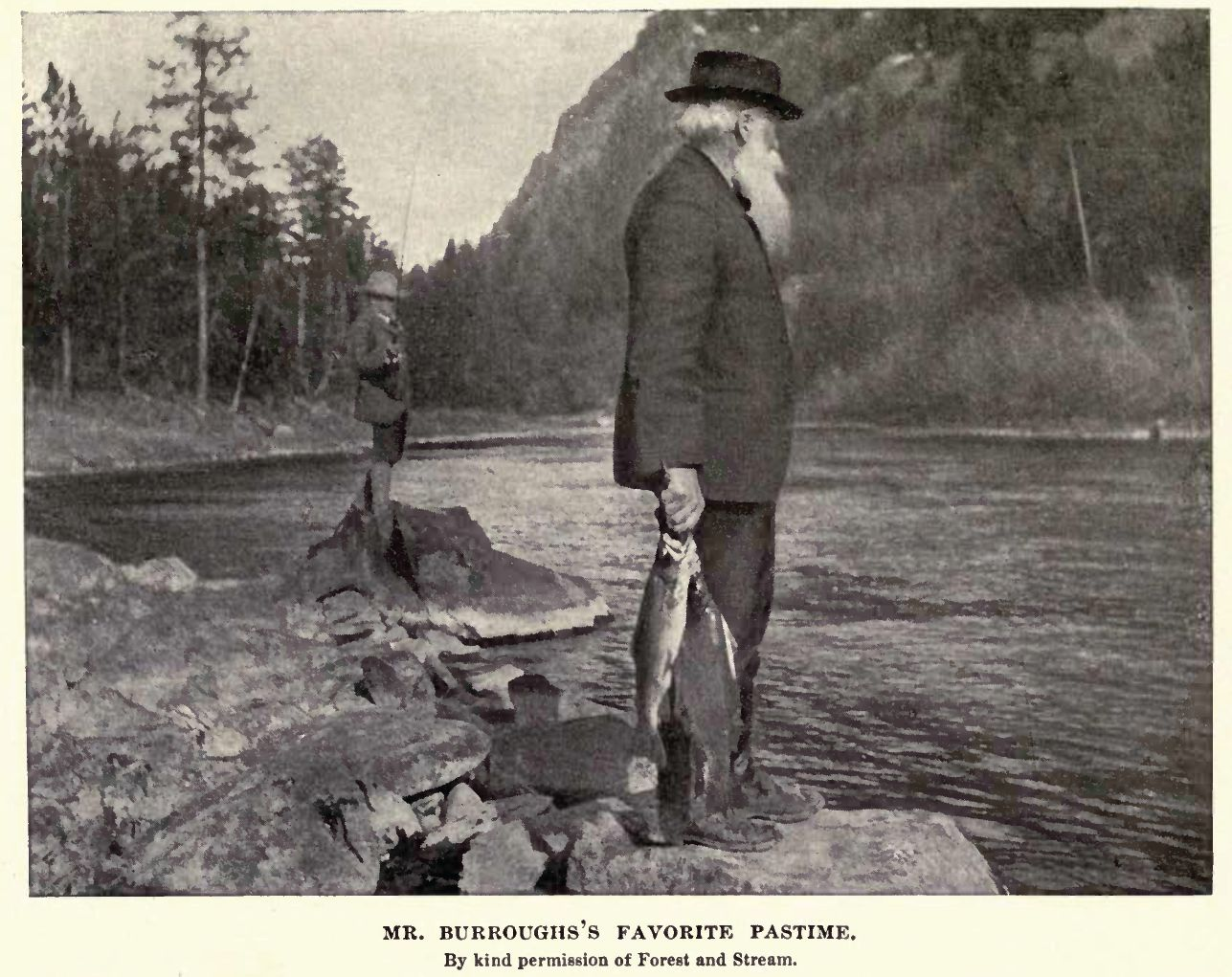
1906 photograph of Burroughs, from Camping & Tramping with Roosevelt

Other Catskill essays told of fly fishing for trout, of hikes over Peekamoose Mountain and Mill Brook Ridge, and of rafting down the East Branch of the Delaware River. It is for these that he is still celebrated in the region today, and chiefly known, although he traveled extensively and wrote about other regions and countries, as well as commenting on natural-science controversies of the day such as the theory of natural selection. He entertained philosophical and literary questions, and wrote another book about Whitman in 1896, four years after the poet's death.

== Fishing ==
From his youth, Burroughs was an avid fly fisherman and known among Catskill anglers. Although he never wrote any purely fishing books, he did contribute some notable fishing essays to angling literature. Most notable of these was Speckled Trout, which appeared in the Atlantic Monthly in October 1870 and was later published in In The Catskills. In Speckled Trout, Burroughs highlights his experiences as an angler and celebrates the trout, streams and lakes of the Catskills.

== Death ==
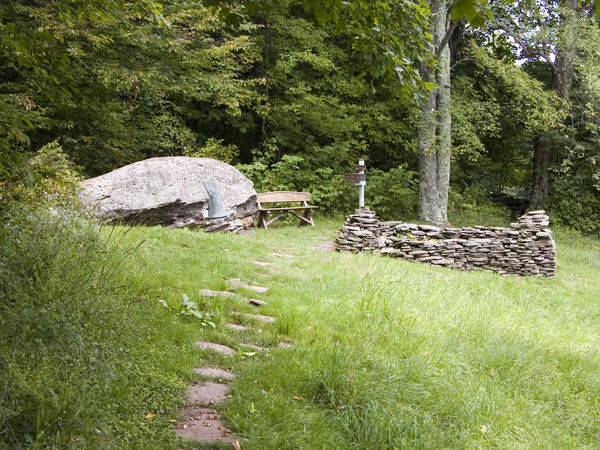
Burroughs gravesite today, Boyhood Rock with plaque on left

Burroughs enjoyed good physical and mental health during his later years until only a few months before his death when he began to experience lapses in memory and show general signs of advanced age including declining heart function. In February 1921, Burroughs underwent an operation to remove an abscess from his chest. After this operation, his health steadily declined. Burroughs died on March 29, 1921, on a train near Kingsville, Ohio. He was buried in Roxbury, New York, on what would have been his 84th birthday, at the foot of a rock he had played on as a child and affectionately referred to as "Boyhood Rock". A line of his is etched on the rock: "I stand amid the eternal ways".

== Legacy ==
Woodchuck Lodge was designated a National Historic Landmark in 1962. Riverby and Slabsides were similarly designated in 1968.

Thirteen U.S. schools have been named for Burroughs, including public elementary schools in Washington, D.C.; Tulsa, Oklahoma; and Minneapolis, Minnesota; public middle schools in Milwaukee, Wisconsin; and Los Angeles; a public high school in Burbank, California, and a private secondary school, John Burroughs School, in St. Louis, Missouri. Burroughs Mountain in Mount Rainier National Park is named in his honor, as is Burroughs Creek in St. Louis County, Missouri.

The John Burroughs Association was founded after his death to commemorate his life and works. It maintains the John Burroughs Sanctuary in West Park, New York, a 170-acre plot of land surrounding Slabsides, and awards a medal each year to "the author of a distinguished book of natural history".

Another award bearing Burroughs name is available to Boy Scouts who attend Seven Ranges Scout Reservation in Kensington, Ohio. The requirements to achieve this award require ample knowledge in the field of plants, rocks and minerals, astronomy, and animals. The award has three levels: bronze, gold, and silver being the highest. Each level requires more knowledge in the given fields.

== Famous quotes ==
- "The Kingdom of heaven is not a place, but a state of mind."
- "Leap, and the net will appear."
- "A man can fail many times, but he isn't a failure until he begins to blame somebody else."

== Works ==
The Complete Writings of John Burroughs totals 23 volumes. The first volume, Wake-Robin, was published in 1871 and subsequent volumes were published regularly until the final volume, The Last Harvest, was published in 1922. The final two volumes, Under the Maples and The Last Harvest, were published posthumously by Clara Barrus. Burroughs also published a biography of John James Audubon, a memoir of his camping trip to Yellowstone with President Theodore Roosevelt, and a volume of poetry titled Bird and Bough.

- Notes on Walt Whitman as Poet and Person (1867)
- Wake Robin (1871)
- Winter Sunshine (1875)
- Birds and Poets (1877)
- Locusts and Wild Honey (1879)
- Pepacton (1881)
- Fresh Fields (1884)
- Signs and Seasons (1886)
- Birds and bees and other studies in nature (1896)
- Indoor Studies (1889)
- Riverby (1894)
- Whitman: A Study (1896)
- The Light of Day (1900)
- Squirrels and Other Fur-Bearers (1900)
- Songs of Nature (Editor) (1901)
- John James Audubon (1902)
- Literary Values and other Papers (1902)
- Far and Near (1904)
- Ways of Nature (1905)
- Camping and Tramping with Roosevelt (1906)
- Bird and Bough (1906)
- Afoot and Afloat (1907)
- Leaf and Tendril (1908)
- Time and Change (1912)
- The Summit of the Years (1913)
- The Breath of Life (1915)
- Under the Apple Trees (1916)
- Field and Study (1919)
- Accepting the Universe (1920)
- Under the Maples (1921)
- The Last Harvest (1922)
- My Boyhood, with a Conclusion by His Son Julian Burroughs (1922)
