= West Park, New York =

Hamlet in New York, United States

- Census-designated place
- Interactive map of West Park, New York
- Coordinates: 41°47′40″N 73°57′34″W
- Country: United States
- State: New York
- County: Ulster

Area
  - Total: 5.41 sq mi (14.00 km^{2})
  - Land: 4.70 sq mi (12.17 km^{2})
  - Water: 0.71 sq mi (1.83 km^{2})

Population (2020)
  - Total: 547
- Time zone: UTC-5 (EST)
  - Summer (DST): UTC-4 (EDT)
- ZIP codes: 12528
- FIPS code: 36-34484
- GNIS feature ID: 970833

West Park is a hamlet on the west side of the Hudson River in the Town of Esopus, Ulster County, New York, United States. During the nineteenth and early twentieth centuries, the area became attractive to the well-to-do seeking second homes because it provided privacy, clean water and relatively inexpensive property.

== Demographics and climate ==
In the last census, West Park recorded a total of 547 residents: 271 males and 276 females. Thirty-eight percent of households in West Park contain children. The median age of the male population is 42.3 and the female population is 42.5. The median annual household income is $84,079. The average high temperature in July is 80.5 °F (26.9 °C), with an average low temperature in January of 17.1 °F (–8.3 °C). The USDA Hardiness Zone is 5B (–20 °F to –15 °F (–29 °C to –26 °C)).

A great deal of land in West Park, much of which borders the Hudson River, is either protected by conservation organizations like Scenic Hudson or owned by religious orders, making available homes in the hamlet scarce and highly sought after. In 2023, the New York Times opined that although the hamlet has some very expensive homes, "the wealth here is quiet."

The ZIP code for West Park is 12493.

== Notable people ==
Some notable residents included: John Jacob Astor, Mother Cabrini, General Daniel Butterworth, Robert Livingston Pell, John Burroughs, Col. Oliver Hazard Payne, financier and philanthropist Archibald Russell, the founder of Ulster Savings Bank and father of Archibald D. Russell, Harry Payne Bingham, John Jewell Smith and later his daughter Hilda Worthington Smith, architect Matthias Hollwich, boxer Floyd Patterson, and show business celebrities Connie Ray, Joe Langworth, Peter Dinklage, Sebastian Roché, Blair Ross and Frances McDormand.

Abolitionist Sojourner Truth was enslaved by John Dumont on his farm overlooking the Hudson in West Park. In 1826, she began her famous walk to freedom from Floyd Ackert Road in West Park to the home of Isaac Van Wagenen in the nearby hamlet of St Remy. A plaque behind the current West Park Post Office memorializes the spot from which Sojourner Truth escaped slavery in West Park.

== Landmarks ==
Holy Cross Monastery, an Anglican monastery of the Order of the Holy Cross, is located in West Park, as is the Cabrini home founded by Roman Catholic Saint Frances Cabrini.

The Marist Brothers occupy a large portion of Hudson River-fronted acreage in West Park on the former Col. Oliver Hazard Payne Estate. The Payne home, known as Omega, a 42,000 square foot historically significant mansion of the Gilded Age, is now operated by Marist College as the Raymond A Rich Leadership Institute. Payne's West Park mansion was faced with imported French limestone and built around a huge central courtyard lined with frescoes. The mansion's 40-plus rooms were walled in rich Circassian walnut, leather and ebony with gold tracery. There were greenhouses, formal gardens, huge barns, a gatehouse and a stone boathouse, where Payne's Aphrodite, the largest yacht in America, was moored. Payne brought his Ming porcelains and Rubens and Turner paintings to West Park.

The Church of the Ascension Holy Trinity, built in 1842 for an Episcopal congregation, is located at 1585 Route 9W in West Park.

A Congregation of Christian Brothers novitiate is also located in West Park. Originally comprising a mansion, schoolhouse and dormitory-style living quarters, the property has been reduced to one building on the west side of Route 9W in West Park. The mansion has a storied history. It was built just prior to the U.S. Civil War in the Italianate style by Scottish-born financier and philanthropist Archibald Russell, and was sold in 1885 to Eugene and Cynthia Durkee whose family amassed a fortune by selling spices and mustards. In the 1920s, the Christian Brothers purchased the Hudson River mansion from the Durkee family. After remaining abandoned for a decade, the mansion and adjacent school building were acquired in 2015 by a number of investors and is now the Hudson House, a luxury vodka distillery, hotel and event space.

In addition to Holy Cross Monastery, the John Burroughs Cabin and John Burroughs Riverby Study are listed on the National Register of Historic Places.
