= Slabsides =

Historic house in New York, United States

- Slabsides (John Burroughs Cabin)
- U.S. National Register of Historic Places
- U.S. National Historic Landmark
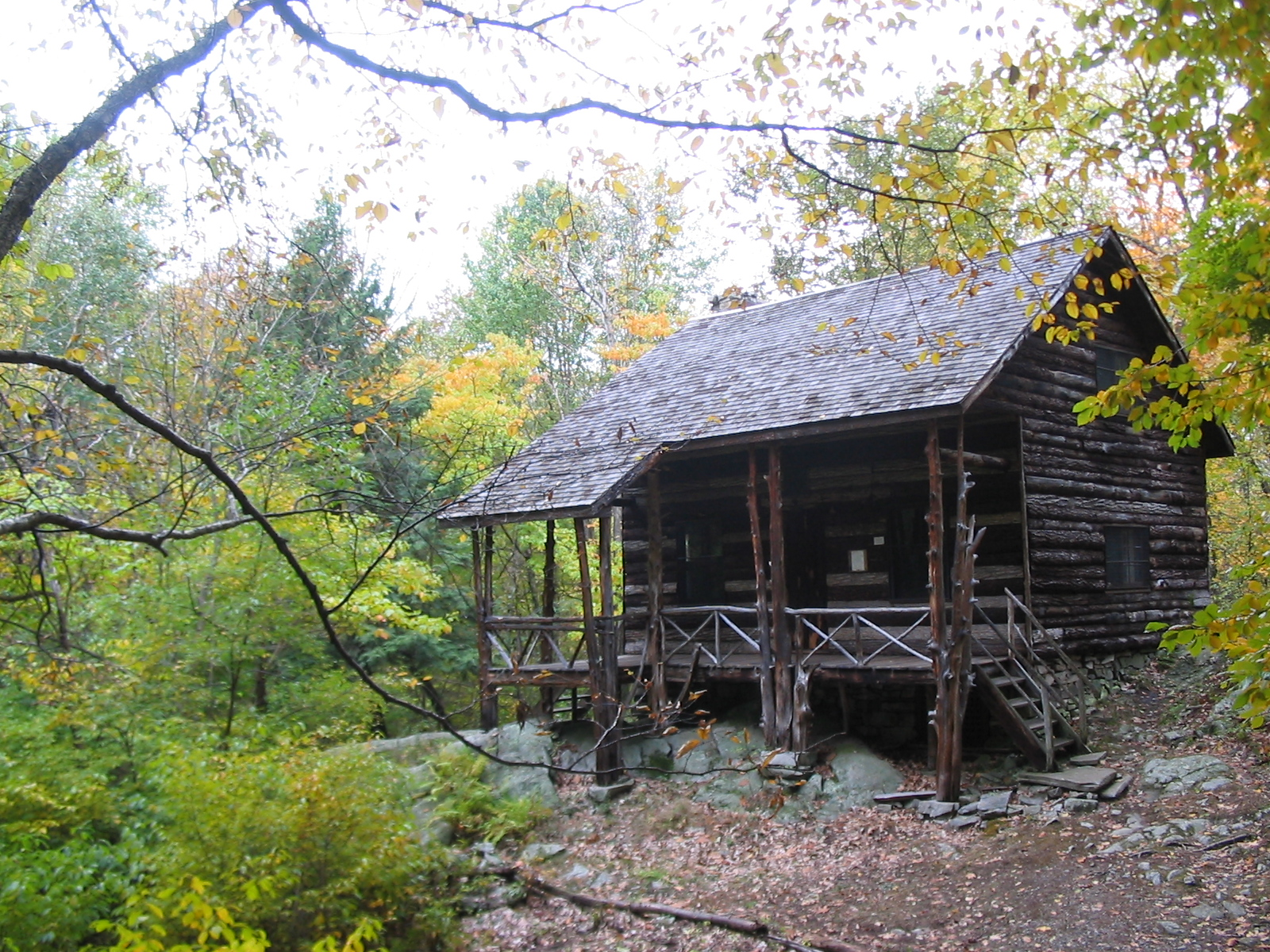
- Slabsides in 2005
- Location: West Park, New York
- Nearest city: Poughkeepsie
- Coordinates: 41°47′40″N 73°58′23″W
- Area: 170 acres (69 ha)
- Built: 1895
- Architect: John Burroughs
- Architectural style: Adirondack log cabin
- NRHP reference No.: 68000034

Significant dates
- Added to NRHP: November 24, 1968
- Designated NHL: November 24, 1968

Slabsides is the log cabin built by naturalist John Burroughs and his son on a nine-acre (3.6 ha) wooded and hilly tract in 1895 one mile (1.6 km) west of Riverby, his home in West Park, New York. From the time of its construction to the last year of his life, Burroughs received many visitors at the cabin, ranging from Theodore Roosevelt and Henry Ford to students from Vassar College, just across the Hudson River.

== Building and site ==
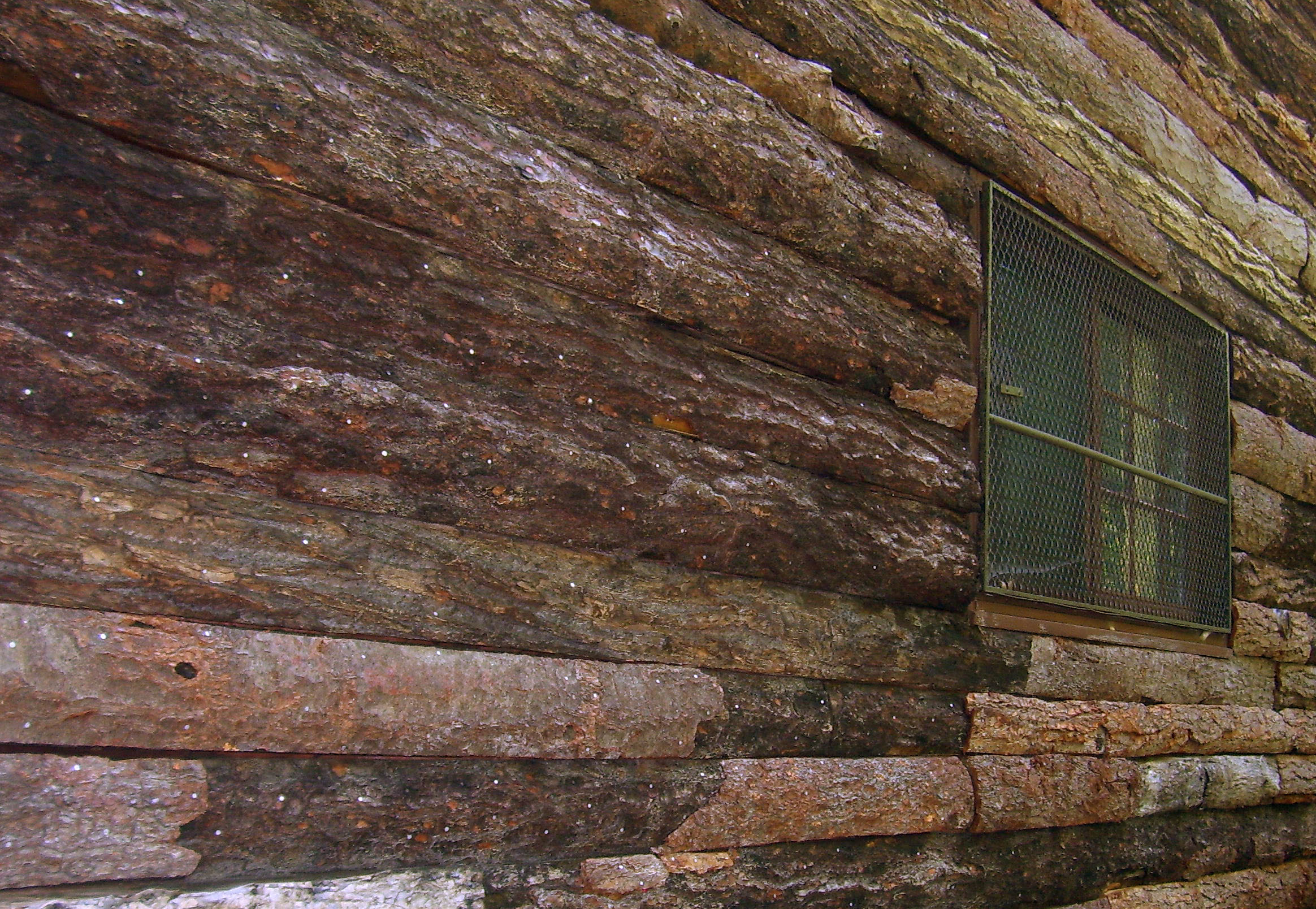
The wood slab siding that gave the cabin its name.

Slabsides is a one-story log cabin with an open floor plan with a partitioned bedroom. It is located in a relatively low stretch of the Marlboro Mountains, perched on the west side of a hill in the wooded John Burroughs Nature Sanctuary. There is no direct access by motor vehicle; to reach it, visitors must park on the gravel road up the hill and follow a gated logging road slightly downhill, then level, approximately 0.3 mile (500 m) to the cabin.

To reach the cabin, visitors must park at the base of the road to it on Burroughs Drive and walk up a half-mile (800 m). The cabin itself, furnished exactly as it was when Burroughs left it, is only open to visitors twice a year, from noon to 4:30 p.m. on the third Saturday in May and the first one in October. Hiking trails have been constructed for visitors to enjoy for themselves the woods that inspired Burroughs. The sanctuary is open year-round.

== History ==
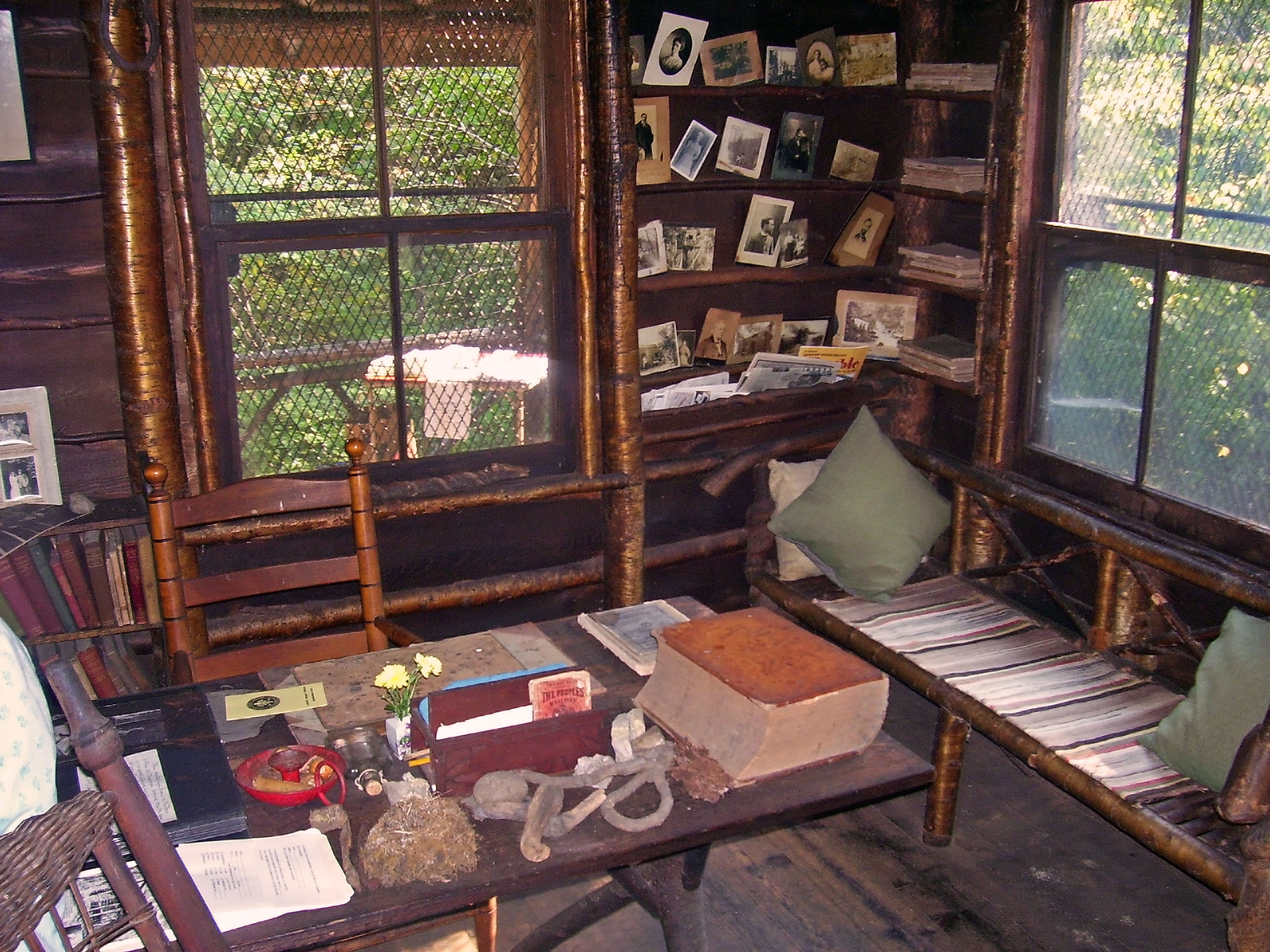
Table and furnishings inside the cabin; built by Burroughs from local wood.

"Life has a different flavor here", Burroughs wrote of the cabin in his essay "Far and Near". "It is reduced to simpler terms; its complex equations all disappear." The name "Slabsides" came from the rough bark-covered lumber strips ("slabs") covering its outer walls. "I might have given it a prettier name, but not one more fit, of more in keeping with the mood that brought me thither". Much of the cabin remains as he and his son built it, including the red cedar posts holding up the porch.

After his death in 1921, the property was presented to the John Burroughs Association, which had just been formed to preserve his legacy. When nearby logging operations and proposed development threatened the property in the mid-1960s, the association purchased the properties with money raised from supporters. This has resulted in an expansion of the property into the 170 acre (68 ha) John Burroughs Sanctuary. The cabin was designated a National Historic Landmark in 1968, joining Riverby and Woodchuck Lodge as Burroughs-associated properties carrying that designation.

== See also ==
- National Register of Historic Places listings in Ulster County, New York
- Riverby
- Woodchuck Lodge
