= Clarence Hawkes =

American author and lecturer

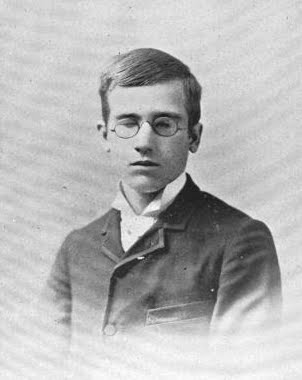
Clarence Hawkes, circa 1894

Clarence Hawkes (December 16, 1869 – January 19, 1954) was an American author and lecturer, known for his nature stories and poetry. One of his most well-known works is his autobiography, titled "Hitting the Dark Trail: Starshine through Thirty Years of Night," published in 1915.

== Biography ==
Born in Goshen, Massachusetts, Hawkes was physically disabled at a young age; part of one leg was amputated when he was nine, and he became blind four years later after a gun discharged in his face during a hunting accident. He was subsequently educated at the Perkins School for the Blind in Boston, where he befriended the young Helen Keller. In 1899, he married Bessie Bell, who illustrated his first book, and the couple moved to Hadley. His prolific career saw the publication of over 100 volumes on a variety of topics; upon his death, the New York Times referred to him as the "blind poet of Hadley".

Asked about the source of his intimate knowledge of nature, Hawkes replied, "It is a matter of study and cultivation ... There were only thirteen years in which I saw the earth and sky, but I had lived much of my life outdoors up to that point. As a boy I stored up on photographic plates within my mind many thousands of pictures of brooks and woods, birds and flowers. They were clear and beautiful. For nearly five years after I began to write I consulted very few books. I wrote from my own store of information. Later I began careful study of the animals I wanted to describe."

In 2009, English professor James A. Freeman published the book Clarence Hawkes: America's Blind Naturalist and the World He Lived In to coincide with the 150th anniversary of Hawkes's birth.

== Selected list of works ==
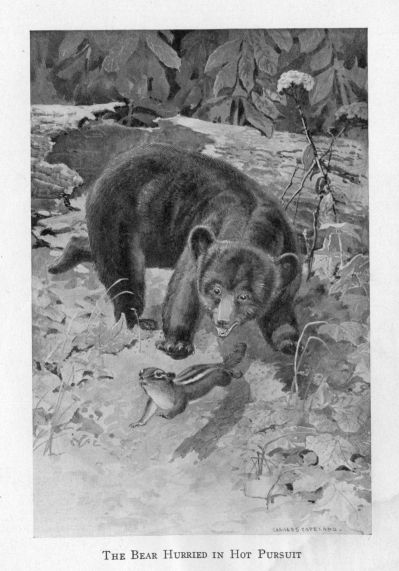
Illustration by Charles Copeland for Clarence Hawkes' Black Bruin (1908)

Works of Clarence Hawkes are available online, mainly through Internet Archive:

- 1895: Pebbles and Shells: Verses
- 1906: Shaggycoat: The Biography of a Beaver
- 1908: Black Bruin: The Biography of a Bear
- 1911: King Of The Thundering Herd: The Biography Of An American Bison
- 1912: Piebald, King of Bronchos: The Biography of a Wild Horse
- 1915: Hitting the Dark Trail (autobiography)
- 1922: Pep: The Story of a Brave Dog
- 1923: Dapples of the Circus: The Story of a Shetland Pony and a Boy via Faded Page
- 1929: Bing: The Story of a Small Dog's Love @ Wikisource

== See also ==
- Ernest William Hawkes, his brother and anthropologist of Alaskan and Northern Canadian Indigenous people
