= Riverby =

- John Burroughs' Riverby Study
- U.S. National Register of Historic Places
- U.S. National Historic Landmark
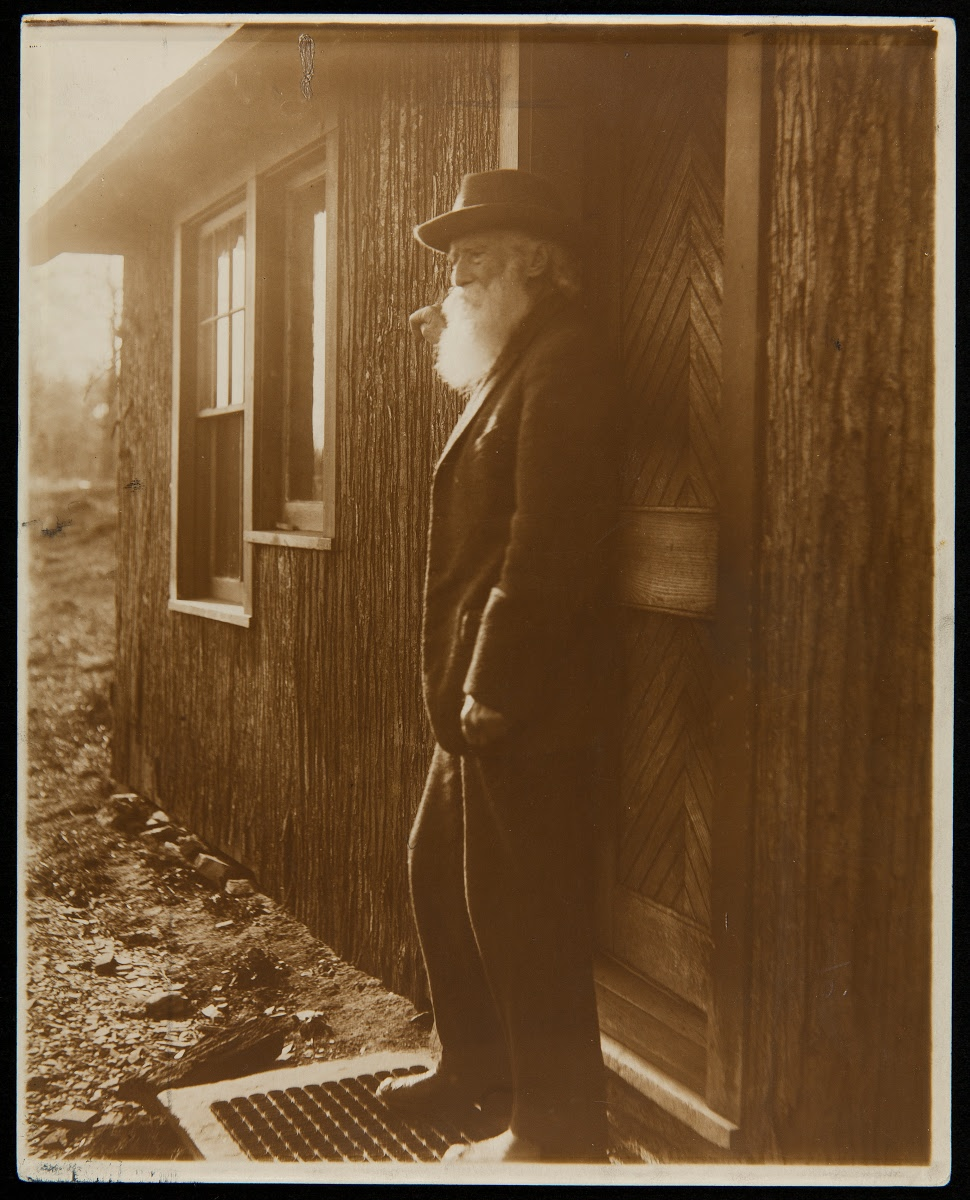
- Burroughs standing in front of Riverby, 1919

- Location within New York
- Location: West Park, New York
- Coordinates: 41°48′0″N 73°57′32″W
- Area: 14.5 acres (5.9 ha)
- Built: 1881
- Architect: John Burroughs
- NRHP reference No.: 68000035

Significant dates
- Added to NRHP: November 24, 1968
- Designated NHL: October 18, 1968

Riverby was the estate of the American naturalist John Burroughs (1837–1921), who wrote and created a genre of naturalist essays. It is located above the west bank of the Hudson River, in the town of West Park, in Ulster County, New York. Burroughs built the main house and a separate study, where he did much of his most influential writing. The property was designated a National Historic Landmark in 1968. It is private property, still partially held by the Burroughs family, and is not open to the public.

== Description and history ==
Riverby is an estate of about 14.5 acres (5.9 ha), set on the west bank of the Hudson River on the east side of United States Route 9W. The terrain is generally wooded, descending steeply through a series of terraces from the road to the river. The main house built by Burroughs is on the highest terrace, and is a three-story structure built out of stone. It was damaged by fire in 1947, and its interior has lost historic integrity. The study located on a lower terrace, is a roughly square frame structure finished in chestnut slabs whose exterior retains unpeeled bark. Other buildings on the property include a barn, summerhouse, and caretaker's cottage.

John Burroughs bought a 9-acre (3.6 ha) farm here in 1873, and added additional land later. In the study, which looks east over the Hudson River, Burroughs wrote Fresh Fields (1884), Signs and Seasons (1886), Indoor Studies (1889), and Riverby (1894), and he edited other works. Theodore Roosevelt and many others visited Burroughs in the study. He also wrote in Woodchuck Lodge, a lodge in Roxbury in the western Catskills of Delaware County, New York, that he used from 1908 on, and Slabsides, a cabin one mile (1.6 km) west of Riverby that he used in summers from 1895 on.

The property was designated a National Historic Landmark in 1968, with only the study as a contributing element. The study is lined with books and, up to 1975 at least, had been preserved essentially as Burroughs left it.

The home is maintained by the Burroughs Society. The collection of buildings on the estate has been split among his descendants, and they discourage visiting the site.

== See also ==
- List of National Historic Landmarks in New York
- National Register of Historic Places listings in Ulster County, New York
- Slabsides
- Woodchuck Lodge
