= Charles Copeland (illustrator) =

American book illustrator

Charles George Copeland
- Born: Charles George Copeland; September 10, 1858; Thomaston, Maine, U.S.
- Died: March 1945 (aged 86); Thomaston, Maine
- Resting place: Thomaston, Maine
- Occupations: artist, illustrator

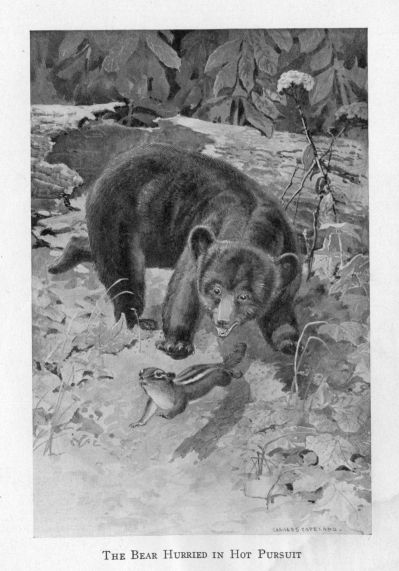
Illustration by Copeland for Clarence Hawkes' Black Bruin (1908)

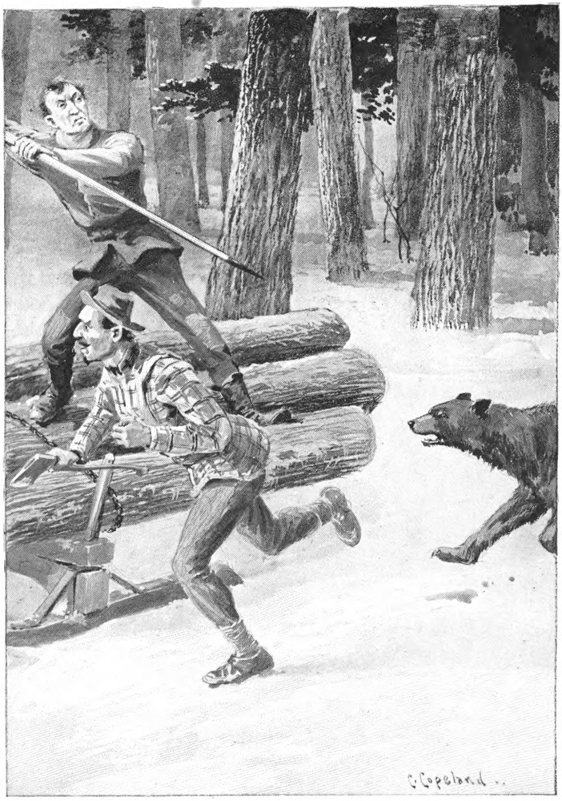
From Little Foresters.

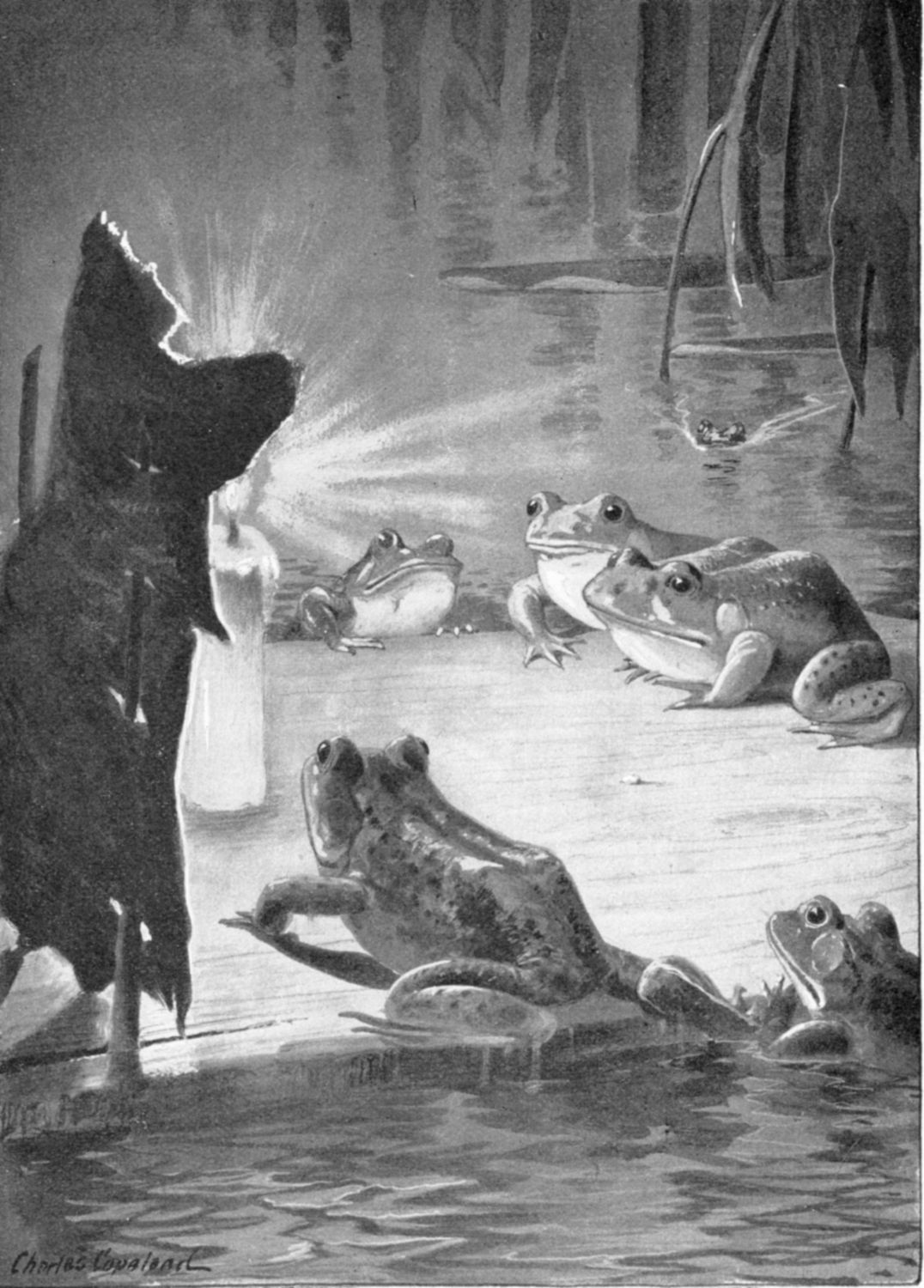
from Wilderness Ways.

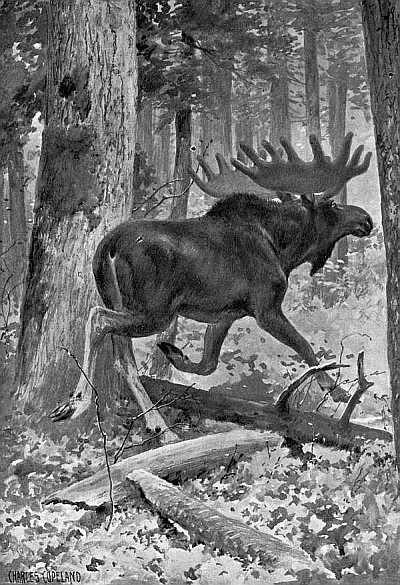
from Little Foresters.

Charles George Copeland (1858–1945) was an American book illustrator active from about 1887 until about 1940. He was a member of the Boston Watercolor Society, and the Boston Art Club. His illustrations were used in a variety of books.

== Genealogy and early life ==
Sea captain Oliver Copeland (b. 1790) married Lois Wyllie in 1818 in Warren, ME; their son, George, married Mary F. Munroe in 1853 and they resided in Thomaston, ME, where their son Charles was born on September 10, 1858. At a young age, Charles worked for a local painter, producing frescoed walls and ceilings in Thomaston. In 1886 Charles married Eda Mills, daughter of Thomaston sea captain Harvey Mills.

== Career ==
In 1888, Charles and Eda lived at 21 Pemberton Square in Boston, MA, while having a house built in Newton, MA. In Newton, he established himself as a full-time artist. His illustrations appear in Youth's Companion, a popular young people's magazine of the time. In addition, Copeland illustrated many books.

Charles and Eda had three children: Margaret Olive Copeland (1889 - 1958), who was a nurse; Helen Mills Copeland Creighton (1898 - ?); and Charlotte Harvey Copeland Gray (1898 – 1983).

The Copeland family spent summer seasons in Thomaston, ME, in Eda's childhood home: a large, Italianate house on 123 Main Street, built by Thomaston architect and builder James Overlock. While in Thomaston, Charles painted watercolors of local scenes. Charles built a studio on the grounds of the home. Admired by the community, Charles was considered a “popular, very tall, well-built man with a closely trimmed beard."
