= The Legend of Lobo =

1962 American film

- Directed by: James Algar; Jack Couffer
- Written by: Dwight Hauser and James Algar
- Based on: "Lobo the King of Currumpaw" by Ernest Thompson Seton
- Produced by: Walt Disney; James Algar; Jack Couffer
- Narrated by: Rex Allen
- Cinematography: Lloyd Beebe; Jack Couffer
- Edited by: Norman R. Palmer
- Music by: Oliver Wallace (score); Richard M. Sherman and Robert B. Sherman (title song); Sons of the Pioneers (title song performers); Walter Sheets (orchestrator)
- Production company: Walt Disney Productions
- Distributed by: Buena Vista Distribution
- Release date: November 7, 1962 (Los Angeles)
- Running time: 67 minutes
- Country: United States
- Language: English

The Legend of Lobo is a 1962 American animal-adventure film that follows the life and adventures of Lobo, a wolf born and raised in southwestern North America. Based upon "Lobo the King of Currumpaw" by Ernest Thompson Seton from the author's 1898 book titled Wild Animals I Have Known, neither the time period nor the precise location are specified in the film, in part because the story is told as much from a wolf's point of view as from a human's. There is no dialogue in the film, with the only interpretation presented through the use of story-song composed and sung by the Sons of the Pioneers and the Sherman Brothers, and narration by Rex Allen. Based on the non-fiction account by Seton, Lobo is an 1890s wolf from an account by Seton who was a naturalist, and was a bounty hunter in the real-life story. Filming took place in Sedona, Arizona.

== Plot ==
The film begins when Lobo is a 6-week-old pup, identical to his brothers and sisters. While his father, El Feroz is out hunting for meat to feed the family, Lobo follows his nose to his first adventure, and takes a tumble down the cliff where the family den is. As soon as he manages to climb back up, a cougar appears on the scene. Things look grim for the wolves, until "a wild card" shows up; cattlemen riding by below the wolves' den spot the cougar, and shoot it as it prepares to pounce on the wolves. The narrator makes it clear that the cattlemen do not favor the wolves: Lobo is only spared because he's out of sight. When Lobo's father returns to the den soon after the incident, he smells both the cougar and the cattlemen, and decides to pick up and move house to avoid them.

As Lobo travels with his family in search of a new den, they interact with a variety of creatures. His father fights with a badger over possession of a den, and the badger wins after an excellent show. At some point Lobo wanders off as his family moves on; he makes friends with a tortoise, chews an armadillo's ear, and is cornered by a rattlesnake when his parents finally arrive to rescue him. As Lobo begins to grow up, he also forms an unusual friendship with a young antelope.

When Lobo is 6 months old, he starts to hunt with the family pack. But rather than buffalo, the wolves' prey are the herds of cattle being driven across the desert. The cattlemen seek revenge on the wolves, and eventually kill Lobo's parents. Winter comes, and Lobo branches off on his own for the first time.

In spring, Lobo joins a new pack, defeats its leader, and takes a mate. He and his pack continue to prey on the cattle that have replaced the buffalo, but is wise enough to avoid all signs of the angry cattlemen who post rewards for his capture – or his death. When the time comes for his pack to split up to mate and raise their pups, Lobo and his mate find a uniquely secure den in an abandoned dwelling that is accessible only by a precarious bridge.

As Lobo continues to feed on their property, the cattlemen's feud with him escalates. To catch the wolves, a professional hunter from Texas brings his pack of tracking hounds: a bloodhound and the coonhounds – Black and Tan, Bluetick, Redbone, and Treeing Walker), and his killer wolfhound. He sets a trap for Lobo and manages to snare Lobo's mate and use her as a lure. But Lobo leads his pack to create a cattle stampede, a diversion that enables him to liberate his mate and strike out for unsettled territory.

== Cast ==
- Lobo as himself
- Émile Genest as Joe Calone (Cattleman 1)
- Walter Pidgeon as Laloche (Cattleman 2)
- Rex Allen as narrator
- Sons of the Pioneers as Themselves

== Reception ==
Bosley Crowther of The New York Times wrote that the narration "cheerily endows the wolf with a great deal more charm and character than is evidenced on the screen. However, to the youngsters, this may not be apparent at all." A review in Variety thought that the film "ranks as about the skimpiest and least effectual of Walt Disney's animal operettas ... Aside from a smattering of information such as the fact that wolves are monogamous critters, co-scenarists Algar and Dwight Hauser, working with a story by Ernest Thompson-Seton, have done an astonishingly half-hearted and unimaginative job of translating the legend into a film story." The Monthly Film Bulletin said that "the photography, as always with these films, is admirable; particularly striking are shots of wolves crossing a perilous chasm."
