= Lobo, the King of Currumpaw =

Short story by Ernest Thompson Seton

- Short story by Ernest Thompson Seton
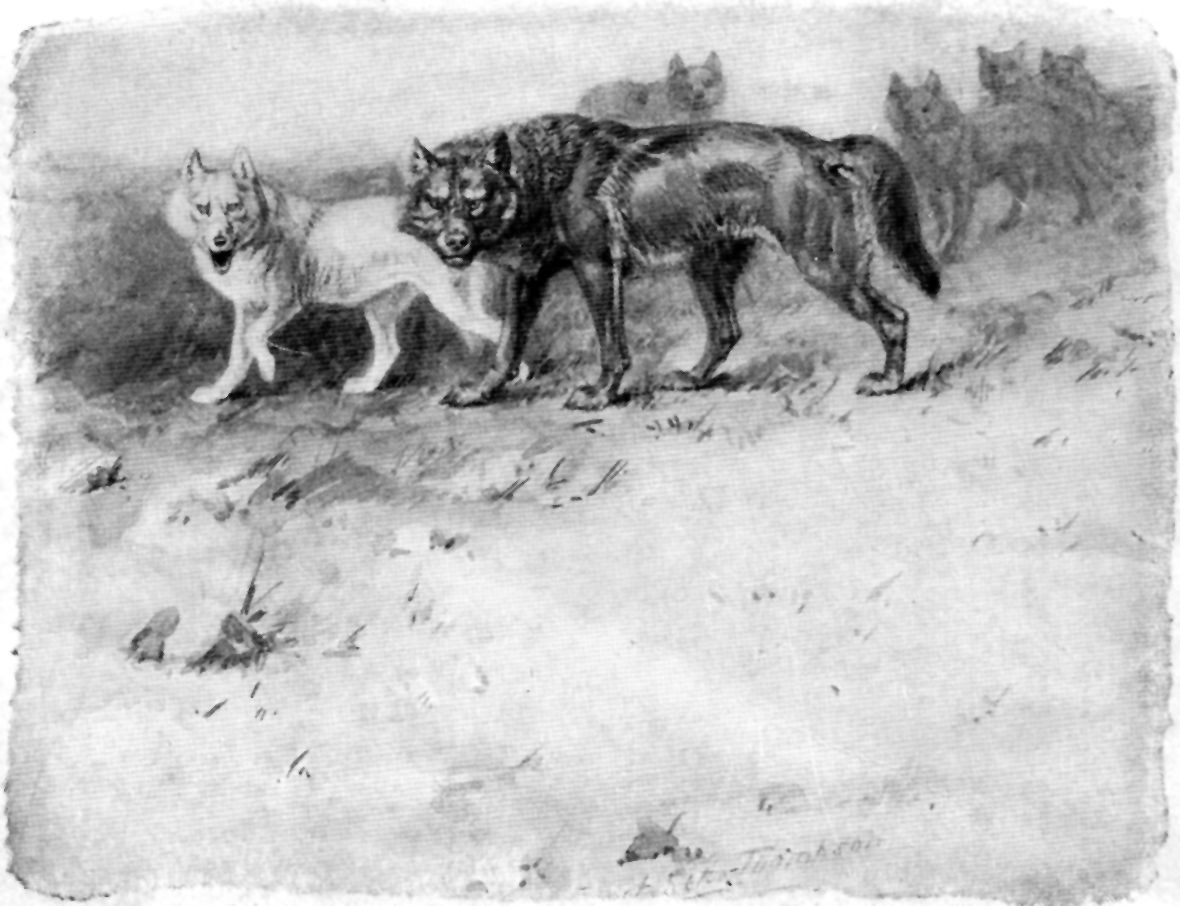
- Lobo and Blanca of the Currumpaw pack

Text available at Wikisource
- Country: United States
- Language: English
- Genre: Fact-based short story

Publication
- Published in: Wild Animals I Have Known
- Publication type: Short story collection
- Publication date: 1898

"Lobo, the King of Currumpaw" is the first story of author Ernest Thompson Seton's 1898 book Wild Animals I Have Known. Seton based the book on his experience hunting wolves in the Southwestern United States.

== Summary ==
Lobo was a Great Plains wolf who lived in the Currumpaw Valley (Corrumpa Creek) in New Mexico. During the 1890s, Lobo and his pack, having been deprived of their natural prey such as bison, elk, and pronghorn by settlers, became forced to prey on the settlers' livestock to survive. The ranchers (at Cross L Ranch) tried to kill Lobo and his pack by poisoning critter carcasses, but the wolves removed the poisoned pieces and threw them aside, eating the rest. They tried to kill the wolves with traps and by hunting parties, but these efforts also failed.

Ernest Thompson Seton was tempted by the challenge and the $1,000 bounty for the head of Lobo, the leader of the pack. Seton tried poisoning four baits, carefully covering traces of human scent, and setting them out in Lobo's territory. The following day all the baits were gone, and Seton assumed Lobo would be dead. Later, however, he found the four baits all in a pile covered by wolf feces to show Lobo's contempt and mockery of Seton's attempt to kill him and the other wolves.

Seton bought new, specialized traps and carefully concealed them in Lobo's territory, but he later found Lobo's tracks leading from trap to trap, exposing each. When an effort that was initially supposed to take two weeks stretched into four months of failed attempts to capture Lobo, Seton became tired and frustrated. While camping out above the creek where snow geese and cranes were wintering, he found Lobo's track strangely following a set of smaller tracks. Quickly he realized Lobo's weakness: his mate, a white wolf nicknamed Blanca. Due to Lobo's misbehavior a rancher named Leandro Vejarano decided to try to get a run at the wolf. This ultimately (and fatally) failed, with Lobo killing Vejarano.

Seton then set out several traps in a narrow passage, thinking Blanca would fall for Seton's planted baits that Lobo had thus far managed to avoid. Finally Seton succeeded; Blanca, while trying to investigate Seton's planted cattle head, became trapped. When Seton found her, she was whining with Lobo by her side. Lobo ran to a safe distance and watched as Seton and his partner killed Blanca and tied her to their horses. Seton heard the howls of Lobo for two days afterward. Lobo's calls were described by Seton as having "an unmistakable note of sorrow in it... It was no longer the loud, defiant howl, but a long, plaintive wail." Although Seton felt remorse for the grieving wolf, he decided to continue his plan to capture Lobo.

Despite the danger, Lobo followed Blanca's scent to Seton's ranch house where they had taken the body. After spotting Lobo wandering near his ranch house, Seton set more traps, using Blanca's body to scent them. Prior to this point, Lobo had not revealed himself to Seton even once since he arrived at the Currumpaw Valley. But now Lobo's isolation had dulled his sense of caution, and he was now at his most vulnerable, which Seton was well aware of. On January 31, 1894, Lobo was caught, with each of his four legs clutched in a trap. On Seton's approach, Lobo stood, despite his injuries, and howled. Seton and his men roped Lobo, muzzled him and secured him with a chain to a horse, taking him back to the ranch. Lobo refused to eat or even look at his captors, instead just gazing across the land. Lobo died that night, four hours later.

== Legacy ==
Lobo's pelt is kept at the Ernest Thompson Seton Memorial Library and Museum at the Philmont Scout Ranch near Cimarron, New Mexico. Until his death in 1946, Seton championed the wolf—an animal that had always previously been demonized. "Ever since Lobo", Seton later wrote, "my sincerest wish has been to impress upon people that each of our native wild creatures is in itself a precious heritage that we have no right to destroy or put beyond the reach of our children."

Seton's story of Lobo touched the hearts of many, both in the U.S. and the rest of the world, and was partly responsible for changing views towards the environment and provided a spur for the starting of the conservationist movement. The story had a profound influence on one of the world's most acclaimed broadcasters and naturalists, Sir David Attenborough, and was adapted into a film by Walt Disney Productions as The Legend of Lobo in 1962. Lobo's story was the subject of a BBC documentary directed by Steve Gooder in 2007.

An account of Seton's hunt for Lobo is found in Ernest Thompson Seton: The Life and Legacy of an Artist and Conservationist by David L. Witt. It is based on Seton's personal journal and other historical sources. The story was also featured in a 2010–2011 exhibition at the New Mexico History Museum.

The Academy for the Love of Learning, an educational organization in Santa Fe, NM, stands on Ernest Thompson Seton's former estate and currently houses the Seton Legacy Project. The Seton Legacy Project, overseen by Academy Historian David Witt, curates Seton's artwork and writings and explores the vital connections between Seton's early 20th century vision of wild nature, contemporary environmental issues, and thoughtful stewardship.

The academy holds an annual Seton birthday event every August. The 2018 event, titled Lobo, The King of Currumpaw: The World's Greatest Wolf Story, centered on the 124th anniversary of this story. An exhibition in the Seton Gallery displayed the original art of more than 50 contemporary artists, each illustrating one part of the Lobo story in their own interpretation, with the collected art published in the form of a graphic novel.

== See also ==
- List of wolves
- Three Toes of Harding County
- Nature fakers controversy
