= Seton Village =

Unincorporated community in New Mexico, United States

- U.S. National Register of Historic Places
- U.S. National Historic Landmark District
- NM State Register of Cultural Properties
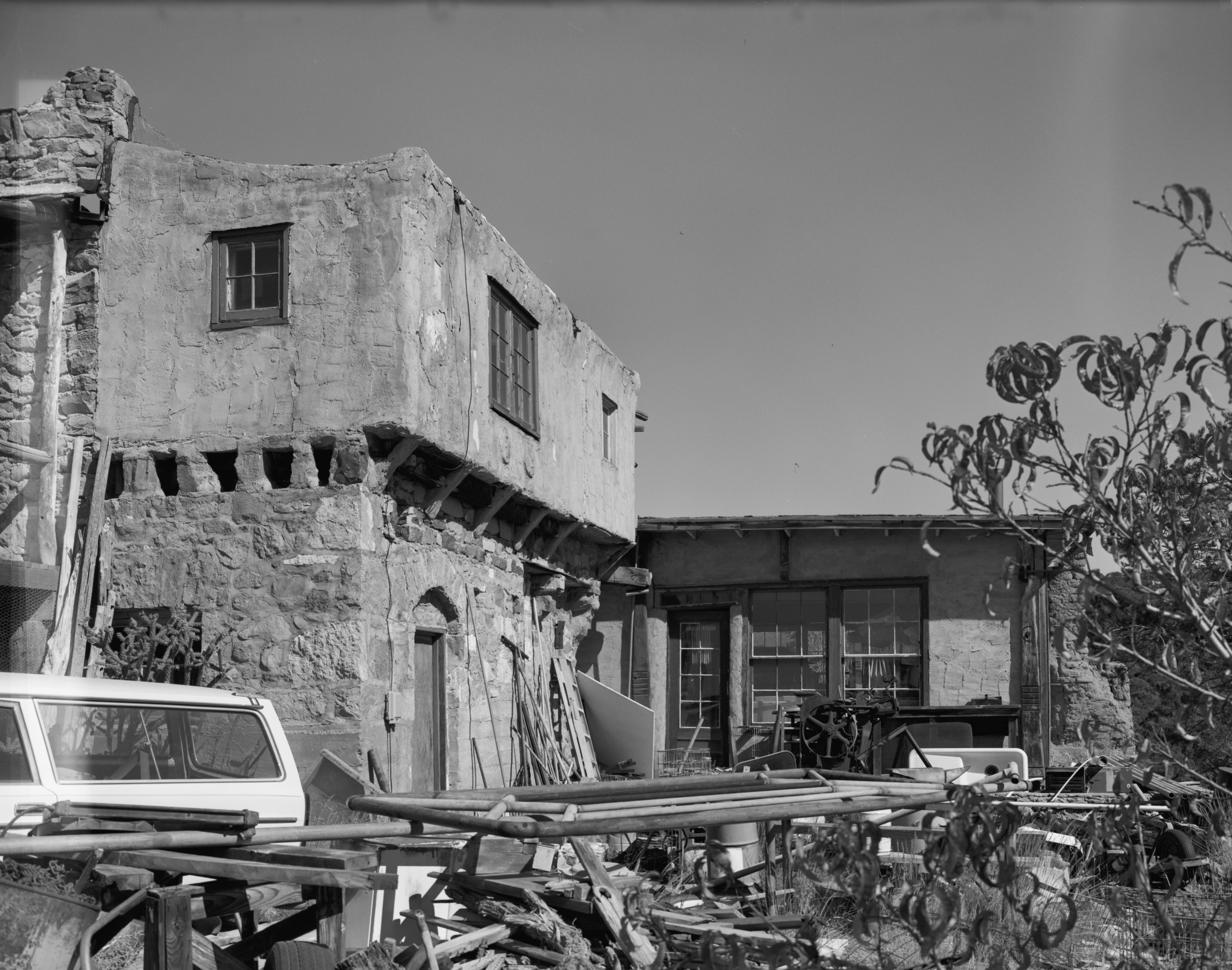
- House at Seton Village

- Location within New Mexico Location within the United States
- Nearest city: Santa Fe, New Mexico
- Coordinates: 35°35′56″N 105°55′54″W
- Area: 43.7 acres (17.7 ha)
- Built: 1946
- NRHP reference No.: 66000492
- NMSRCP No.: 119

Significant dates
- Added to NRHP: October 15, 1966
- Designated NHLD: December 21, 1965
- Designated NMSRCP: May 18, 1973

Seton Village is a National Historic Landmark District in a rural residential area south of Santa Fe in Santa Fe County, New Mexico, United States. It encompasses a residential settlement and educational facility established in 1930 by Ernest Thompson Seton (1860–1946), an educator and conservationist best known as a founder of the Boy Scouts of America. The district includes the remains of Seton's 32-room home and other residential and educational buildings constructed mostly between 1930 and 1945. It was declared a National Historic Landmark in 1965.

== Description ==
Seton Village is located approximately 7 miles (11 km) south of downtown Santa Fe and west of Interstate 25 on County Road 58. The village has a central plaza, ringed by adobe residences and community buildings. To the east of the plaza stand the remains of Seton's 32-room castle, which burned during restoration in 2005. Distinctive structures in the village include two buildings that were built around railroad cars that Seton brought to the site. Stripped of their interiors, the two cars were finished plaster on the inside, and had adobe walls built around them. One of these buildings has since had the car removed from its inside.

=== Seton Castle ===
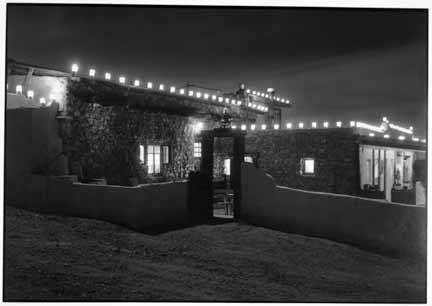
Christmas luminarios at Seton Village, 1950s

Seton began designing and building his castle in 1933. The 32-room, 6,900 square foot (640 m^{2}) multi-level building had a flat-roof and rough hewn stone wall exterior. The interior had oak floors and plaster walls with the ceilings supported by log rafters. The Castle was built on one of the highest points on Seton's property, with views over his village and the western landscape.

=== Community activities ===
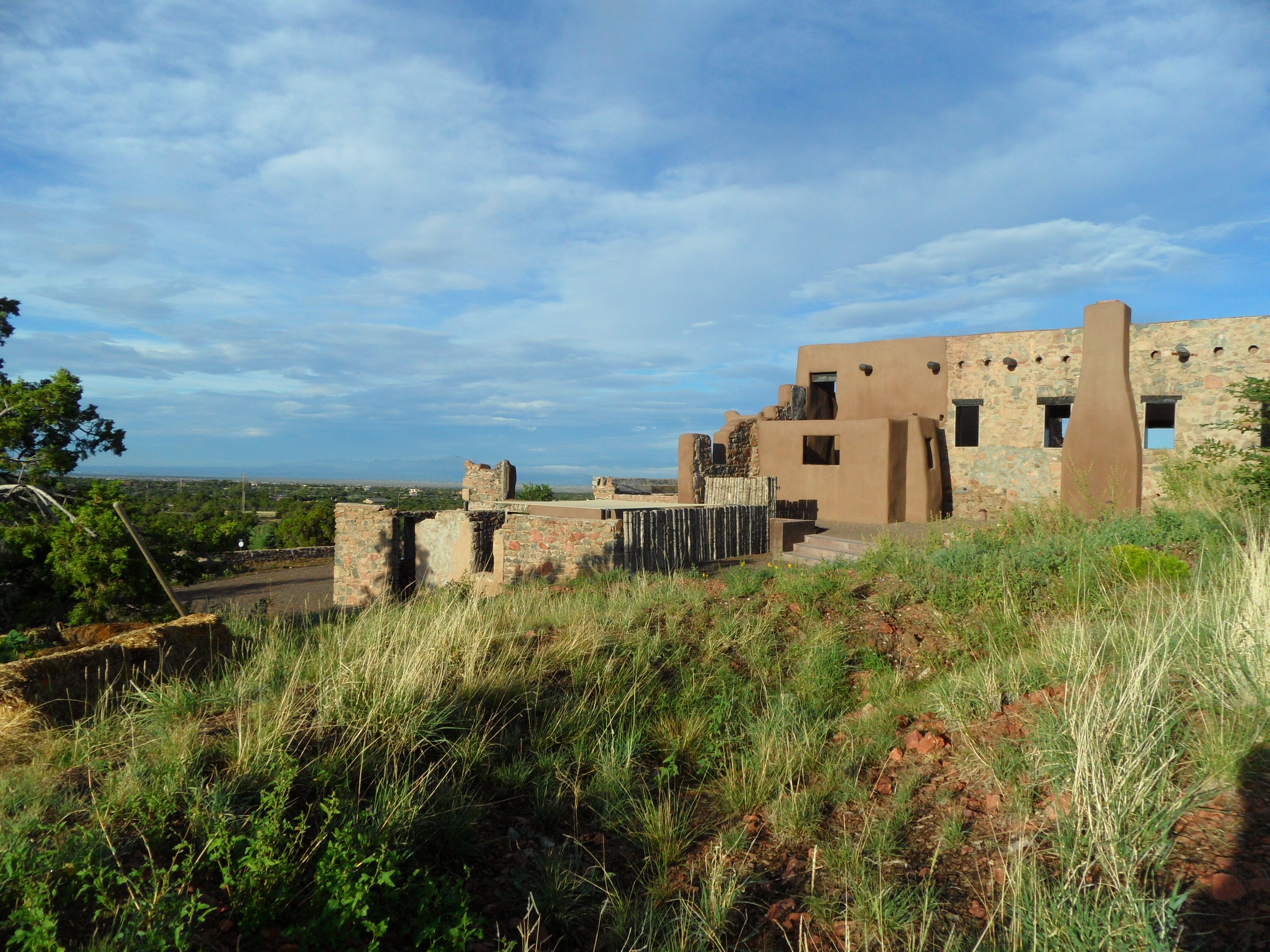
Seton Castle, at Seton Village, New Mexico. 2014 photo by David L. Witt.

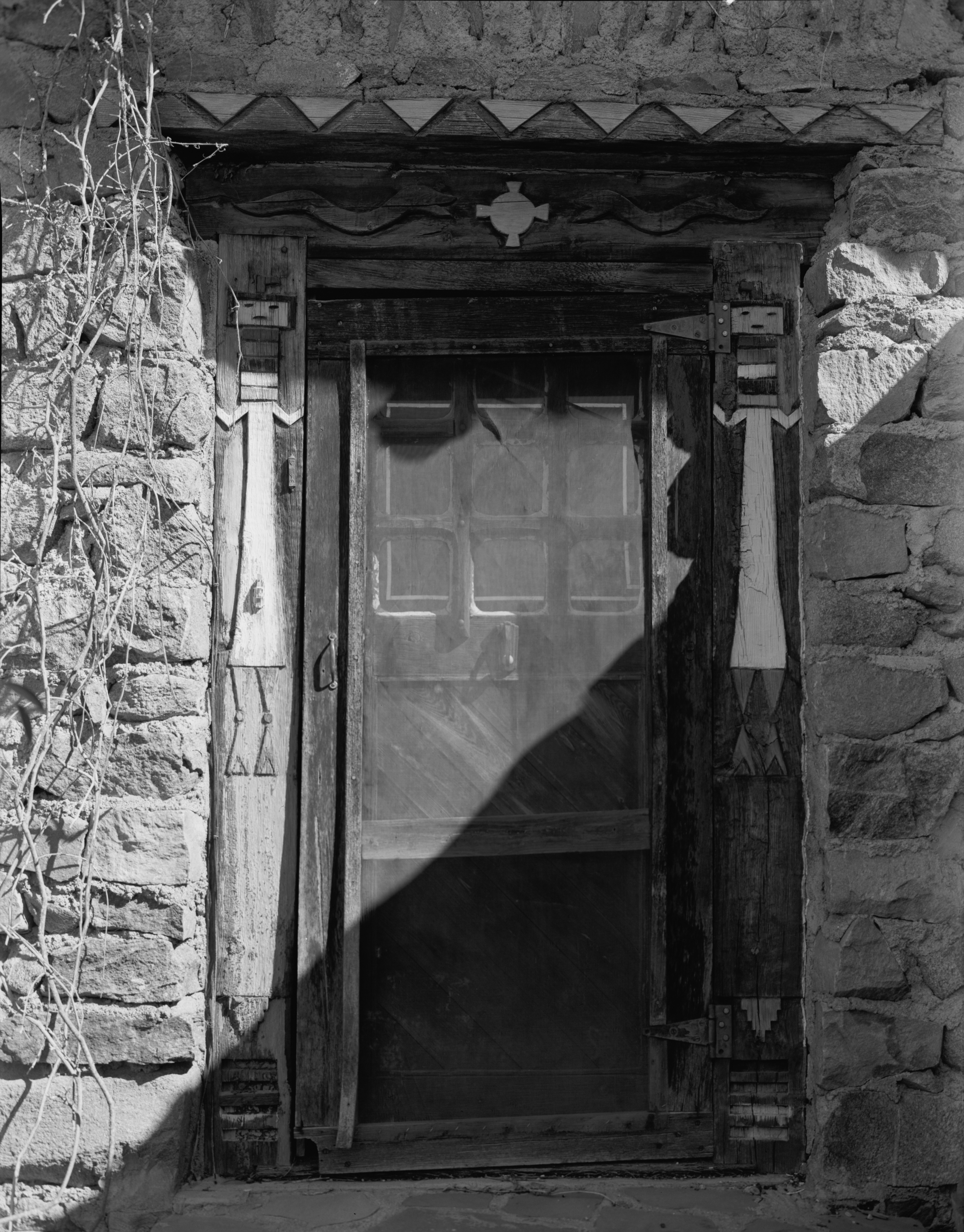
Decorated doorway, "Indian Village" Ernest Thompson Seton House. HABS photo, no date

The Village was home to the Seton Institute, including the Woodcraft League and the College of Indian Wisdom, which provided Woodcraft and Scouting leaders with a variety of training opportunities. The Institute closed at the outbreak of World War II.

At Seton's invitation, Maurice and Marceil Taylor moved their printing equipment to New Mexico in 1938 and set up the Seton Village Press. The Village Press closed in 1943, also because of the war.

== Seton Village today ==
Seton Village is designated a National Historic Landmark and a New Mexico State Cultural Property. The Academy for the Love of Learning, an educational organization which owns the property, preserved the castle ruins as a "contemplative garden." The Academy's Seton Legacy Project maintains a collection of art and archives pertaining to Ernest Thompson Seton. The Academy Campus, including the Seton art gallery, opened in 2011.

The village has a view of the Jemez Mountains and Mount Taylor.

== Education ==
It is within Santa Fe Public Schools.

== See also ==
- National Register of Historic Places listings in Santa Fe County, New Mexico
- List of National Historic Landmarks in New Mexico
