= Bannertail: The Story of Gray Squirrel (TV series) =

Japanese anime television series

- Japanese magazine cover
- シートン動物記 りすのバナー
- Based on: Bannertail by Ernest Thompson Seton
- Written by: Toshiyuki Kashikura
- Directed by: Yoshio Kuroda
- Music by: Akihiro Komori
- Country of origin: Japan
- Original language: Japanese
- No. of episodes: 26

Production
- Executive producer: Koichi Motohashi
- Producer: Akira Negoro
- Production companies: Nippon Animation; Asahi Broadcasting Corporation

Original release
- Network: ANN (ABC, TV Asahi)
- Release: April 7 – September 29, 1979

Bannertail: The Story of Gray Squirrel (シートン動物記 りすのバナー, Shīton Dōbutsuki Risu no Banā) is a Japanese anime series made by Nippon Animation in 1979. It is based on the 1922 children's book Bannertail by Ernest Thompson Seton. It ran for a total of 26 episodes and told the story of Banner, a young orphaned squirrel raised by a kindly mother cat, and his adventures in the forest. It is also known by its German version, entitled Puschel, das Eichhorn. In the Arab and Persian worlds, where the anime succeeded in attracting young viewers and gained much popularity, it is known as Sanjob (سنجوب) or Sanajeb-el Gaaba (سناجب الغابة). It was also popular in Spain and Latin America under the name Banner & Flappy, and also in Portugal, under the name Bana & Flapi.

== Characters ==
- Banner (Noriko Tsukase, Robert Axelrod (English)) is the protagonist of the series, a young squirrel who wears a bell around his neck. Orphaned as a baby, he was taken in and raised by a cat. A fire in the first episode separates him from his adopted mother and he flees to the forest where he befriends the wild squirrels and learns to survive. His feline upbringing means he is braver and tougher than other squirrels. Rather than flee from predators he will often attack them head on, especially to save his friends.
- Sue (Keiko Yokozawa) is a young female squirrel with a flower in her hair. She is attracted to Banner due to his innocence and more than any of the others she is helpful in teaching him how to survive in the wild. The two eventually marry and have children in the series' final episode.
- Grandfather (Kazuomi Ikeda) is Sue's grandfather and the oldest and wisest of the squirrels. He presides over festivals and ceremonies and makes all of the important decisions. He is calm and thoughtful.
- Clay (Masako Sugaya) is a squirrel much younger than Banner. He is the first of the wild squirrels Banner meets, when Banner saves him from a fox. He and Banner quickly become best friends.
- Lori (Hiroko Maruyama) is Clay's overprotective mother. She is constantly fearful for her child's safety, and like the others is initially distrustful of Banner until he saves both her and Clay from a farmer.
- Gocha and Radōru (Shigeru Chiba and Kaneta Kimotsuki) are the two comic relief friends of Banner. They are initially antagonistic and distrustful of Banner (Radōru more than Gocha) but eventually become close friends with him after Banner rescues Radōru from a snapping turtle.
- Akācho (Takeshi Aono) is a squirrel with long pointed ears who pines for Sue and develops a rivalry with Banner for her hand in marriage. He is cunning, underhanded, devious, and arrogant.
- Uncle Owl (Ichirō Nagai) is an owl who is the first denizen of the forest who Banner encounters. Initially he intends to eat him, but Banner, thinking himself a cat, fights back rather than flee, earning Owl's respect and eventually his friendship. When some hunters enter the forest, Owl is killed by a bullet intended for Banner.
- Mother Cat (Ikuko Tani) is Banner's adopted mother. She raised him as her own after he was found alone as a baby by the farmer's son. She is the one who gave Banner the bell he wears at all times. She and Banner were separated in a fire in the first episode, but are eventually reunited.
- Other characters include a chipmunk and a pair of rats named Non and Nen.

== Episode list ==
No.	Title	Original release date
1	"A Kitten is a Squirrel?"; Transliteration: "Neko no Ko wa Risu" (Japanese: ねこの子は りす)	April 7, 1979
2	"Friends of the Forest"; Transliteration: "Mori no Nakama" (Japanese: 森のなかま)	April 14, 1979
3	"Banner's Own Home"; Transliteration: "Banā no Mai Hōmu" (Japanese: バナーのマイホーム)	April 21, 1979
4	"A Strange Thief"; Transliteration: "Okashina Doro Bō" (Japanese: おかしなどろぼう)	April 28, 1979
5	"Tail Parachute"; Transliteration: "Shippo no Parashūto" (Japanese: しっぽのパラシュート)	May 5, 1979
6	"We're All Friends"; Transliteration: "Min'na Tomodachi" (Japanese: みんな ともだち)	May 12, 1979
7	"Clay Runs Away"; Transliteration: "Kurē no Iede" (Japanese: クレーの家出)	May 19, 1979
8	"Clay Rescue Mission"; Transliteration: "Kurē Kyūshutsu Sakusen" (Japanese: クレー救出作戦)	May 26, 1979
9	"Moving-Out Curse"; Transliteration: "Hikkoshi Iwai" (Japanese: 引っこし祝い)	June 2, 1979
10	"Squirrel School"; Transliteration: "Risu no Gakkō" (Japanese: リスの学校)	June 9, 1979
11	"Rabbit in a Rose Briar"; Transliteration: "Bara no Shigemi no Usagi" (Japanese: バラの茂みのうさぎ)	June 16, 1979
12	"Scary Field Trip"; Transliteration: "Kowai Ensoku" (Japanese: こわい遠足)	June 23, 1979
13	"Lure of the Mushrooms"; Transliteration: "Kinoko no Yūwaku" (Japanese: きのこのゆうわく)	June 30, 1979
14	"Run While You Can"; Transliteration: "Nigeruga Kachi" (Japanese: 逃げるがかち)	July 7, 1979
15	"Wandering Porcupine"; Transliteration: "Sasurai no Yamārashi" (Japanese: さすらいのヤマアラシ)	July 14, 1979
16	"Sue's Star Fortunetelling"; Transliteration: "Sū no Hoshi Uranai" (Japanese: スーの星うらない)	July 27, 1979
17	"Topsy-Turvy Confusion"; Transliteration: "Abekobe Gocha" (Japanese: あべこべゴチャ)	July 28, 1979
18	"Blooming in Autumn"; Transliteration: "Minori no Aki" (Japanese: みのりの秋)	August 4, 1979
19	"Found a Music Box"; Transliteration: "Hirotta Orugōru" (Japanese: ひろったオルゴール)	August 11, 1979
20	"Death of a Horned Owl"; Transliteration: "Mimizuku no Shi" (Japanese: ミミズクの死)	August 18, 1979
21	"Farewell to Hickory Forest"; Transliteration: "Hikkorī no Mori yo Saraba" (Japanese: ヒッコリーの森よ さらば)	August 21, 1979
22	"To a New Forest"; Transliteration: "Atarashī Mori o Mezashite" (Japanese: 新しい森をめざして)	September 1, 1979
23	"Dangerous Quarrel"; Transliteration: "Kiken'na Nakatagai" (Japanese: きけんな仲たがり)	September 8, 1979
24	"City Adventure"; Transliteration: "Machi no Bō Ken" (Japanese: 町のぼうけん)	September 15, 1979
25	"Winter Journey"; Transliteration: "Fuyu no Tabi" (Japanese: 冬の旅)	September 22, 1979
26	"In a New Forest"; Transliteration: "Atarashī Mori de" (Japanese: 新しい森で)	September 22, 1979
