= Bannertail =

1922 novel by Ernest Thompson Seton

- First edition cover
- Author: Ernest Thompson Seton
- Illustrator: Ernest Thompson Seton
- Language: English
- Published: 1922
- Publisher: Charles Scribner's Sons
- Publication place: United States
- Media type: Print
- Pages: 265 pp

Bannertail: The Story of a Gray Squirrel is a children's novel written and illustrated by Ernest Thompson Seton. It was first published by Charles Scribner's Sons in 1922. The novel was adapted into an animated television series, Bannertail: The Story of Gray Squirrel, in 1979.

== Plot summary ==
A baby squirrel is adopted by a farm cat after his mother is killed, but when he is half-grown the barn which is his home catches fire. He flees into the woods, where he learns to survive and make a new life.

== The author's aims ==
From the Foreword:

These are the ideas that I have aimed to set forth in this tale.

1st. That although an animal is much helped by its mother's teaching, it owes still more to the racial teaching, which is instinct, and can make a success of life without its mother's guidance, if only it can live through the dangerous time of infancy and early life.

2d. Animals often are tempted into immorality—by which I mean, any habit or practice that would in its final working, tend to destroy the race. Nature has rigorous ways of dealing with such.

3d. Animals, like ourselves, must maintain ceaseless war against insect parasites—or perish.

4th. In the nut forests of America, practically every tree was planted by the Graysquirrel, or its kin. No squirrels, no nut-trees.

== Television adaptation ==
Bannertail: The Story of Gray Squirrel was produced by Nippon Animation in 1979. There are 26 episodes. The series was translated from Japanese into English, into German as Puschel, das Eichhorn, into Afrikaans as Pokkel die eekhoring, into Arabic as Sanjob (سنجوب) or Sanajeb-el Gaaba (سناجب الغابة), and into Spanish as Banner y Flappy.
