= Wild Animals I Have Known =

1898 book by Ernest Thompson Seton

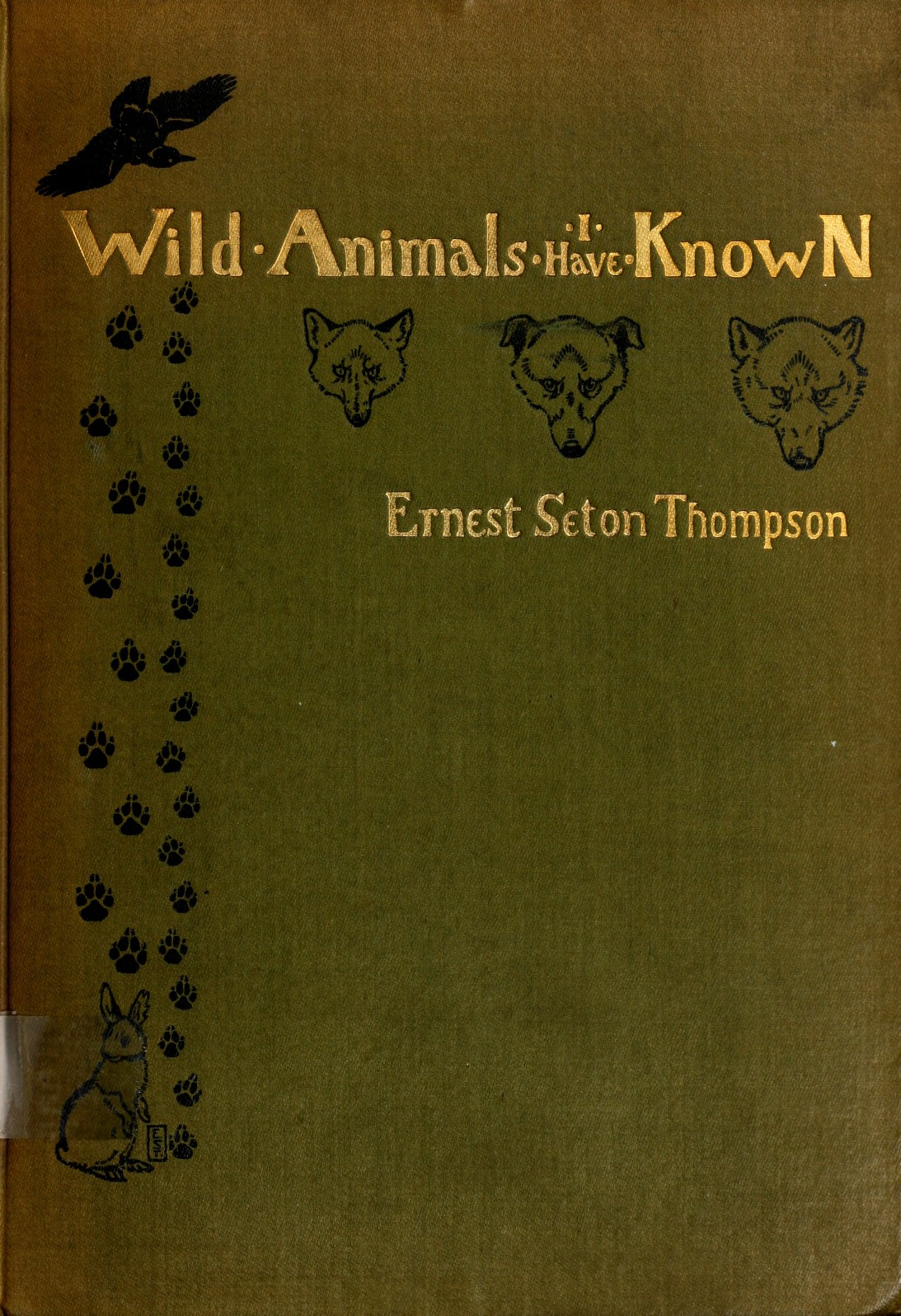
- Author: Ernest Thompson Seton (as Ernest Seton-Thompson)
- Illustrator: Ernest Thompson Seton
- Language: English
- Subject: Animals
- Genre: Children's literature
- Published: 1898
- Publisher: Charles Scribner's Sons
- Publication place: United States
- Pages: 359
- Text: Wild Animals I Have Known at Wikisource

Illustration from Ernest Thompson Seton's Wild Animals I Have Known (1898)

Wild Animals I Have Known is an 1898 book by naturalist and author Ernest Thompson Seton. The first entry in a new genre of realistic wild-animal fiction, Seton's first collection of short stories quickly became one of the most popular books of its day. "Lobo the King of Currumpaw", the first story in the collection, was based upon Seton's experience hunting wolves in the southwestern United States. It became a classic, setting the tone for his future works that would similarly depict animals—especially predators who were often demonized in literature—as compassionate, individualistic beings.

Several years after its publication, Seton and his works came under fire during the nature fakers controversy, which began in 1903 when naturalist John Burroughs published an essay called "Real and Sham Natural History" in The Atlantic Monthly. In particular Burroughs blamed Seton's collection of stories for founding the sentimental animal story genre, which he felt featured fabricated events and wild animal behaviors; he even amended the title of the collection to Wild Animals I Alone Have Known.

== Contents ==
- Lobo, the King of Currumpaw
- Silverspot, the Story of a Crow
- Raggylug, the Story of a Cottontail Rabbit
- Bingo, the Story of My Dog
- The Springfield Fox
- The Pacing Mustang
- Wully, the Story of a Yaller Dog
- Redruff, the Story of the Don Valley Partridge

== Reception ==
The book was an immediate critical and commercial success. Science called it "original in conception and execution", praised Seton for treating the animals as characters rather than objects, and recommended it for both general readers and natural history enthusiasts. Ornithology (known at the time as The Auk) called it "as pleasing as it is original" and recommended it despite only two of the stories focusing on birds. The Auk took note of Seton's use of anthropomorphism: "In the lives of these 'dumb creatures' there is something pathetically human, that appeals to the reader's sympathies, and shows how much there is in man and beast that is shared in common. By 1901, the book had gone through eight editions.

Seton's accompanying artwork was especially well-received. The Auk said that the drawing in the margins were "suggestive and appropriate", while Science called the margins "so skillfully executed as to make it possible to follow certain parts of the story merely by the illustrations." Some of Seton's illustrations were displayed at Frederick Keppel's gallery.

=== Nature fakers controversy ===
In his 1903 essay "Real and Sham Natural History", John Burroughs initiated the nature fakers controversy, in which he accused other nature writers of lying about animal behavior in their writings. Seton was one of the essay's targets; Burroughs joked that a more appropriate title for the book would be "Wild Animals I Alone Have Known." He went on to list several grievances he had with Seton's claims, such as the idea that animals punish their young for misbehaving, or that a vixen would encourage her trapped kit to commit suicide by poisoning. Burroughs especially took offense to "Silverspot, the Story of a Crow", in which Seton claimed that crows can count and have specific calls which correlate to certain English words.
