= Ernest Thompson Seton =

Canadian and American writer and artist (1860–1946)

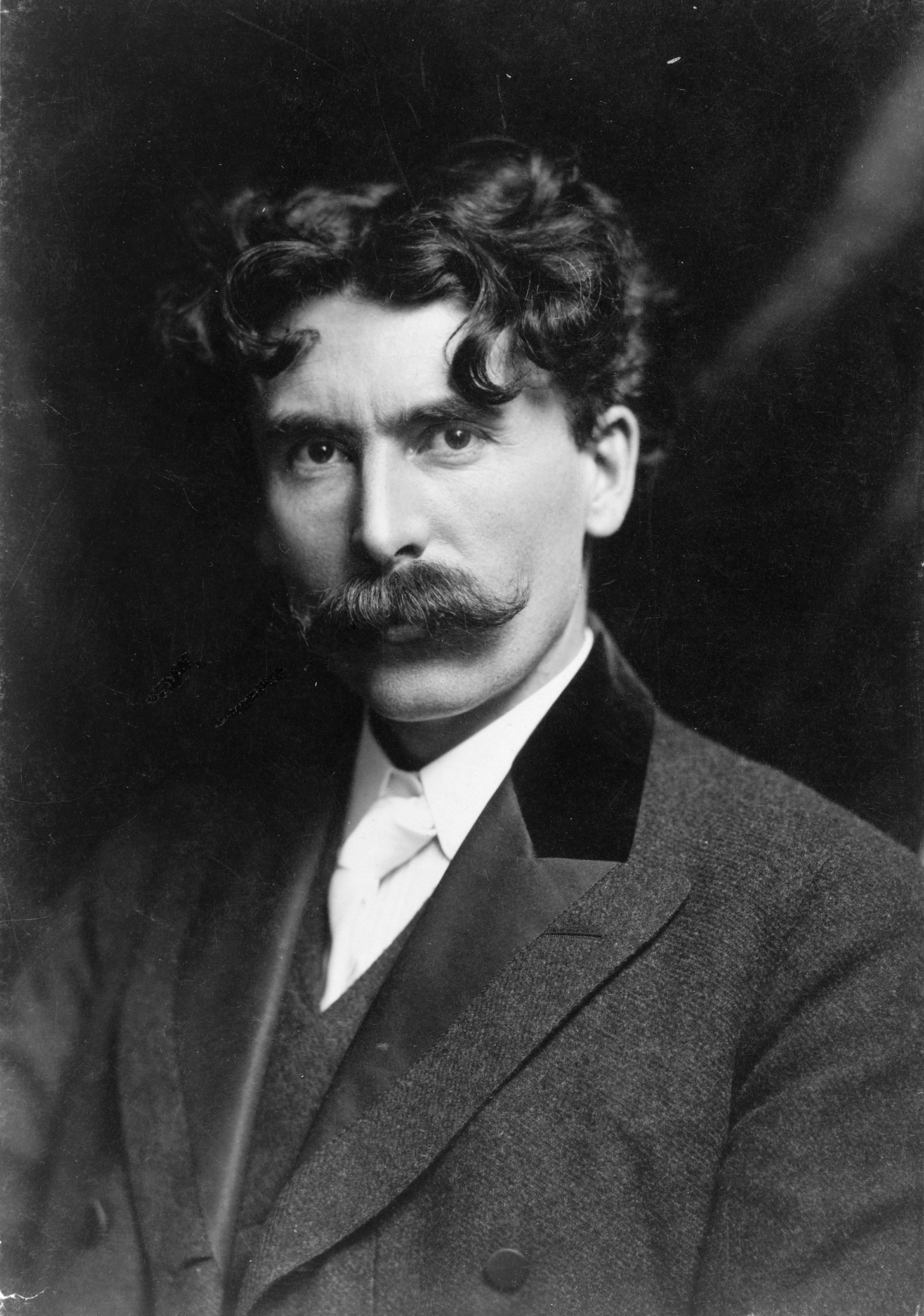
- Seton in 1901
- Born: Ernest Evan Thompson; August 14, 1860; South Shields, County Durham, England, United Kingdom
- Died: October 23, 1946 (aged 86); Seton Village, New Mexico, United States
- Other names: Ernest Seton-Thompson; Black Wolf; Chief
- Occupations: Author, wildlife artist
- Known for: Founder of the Woodcraft Indians and founding pioneer of the Boy Scouts of America
- Spouses: Grace Gallatin (m. 1896–1935); Julia Moss Buttree
- Children: Anya Seton (daughter); Dee Barber Seton (daughter)
- Parents: Joseph Logan Thompson (father); Alice Snowdon Thompson (mother)
- Awards: John Burroughs Medal (1927); Daniel Giraud Elliot Medal (1928); Silver Buffalo Award

Ernest Thompson Seton (born Ernest Evan Thompson; August 14, 1860 – October 23, 1946) was a Canadian and American author, wildlife artist, founder of the Woodcraft Indians in 1902 (renamed Woodcraft League of America), and one of the founding pioneers of the Boy Scouts of America (BSA) in 1910.

Seton also influenced Lord Baden-Powell, the founder of the Scouting movement. His writings were published in the United Kingdom, Canada, the US, and the USSR; his notable books related to Scouting include The Birch Bark Roll and the Boy Scout Handbook. He incorporated what he believed to be American Indian elements into the traditions of the BSA.

== Early life ==
Seton was born in South Shields, County Durham, England to Scottish parents. His family emigrated to British North America in 1866. After settling in Lindsay, Canada West Seton spent most (after 1870) of his childhood in Toronto, and the family is known to have lived at 6 Aberdeen Avenue in Cabbagetown. As a youth, he retreated to the woods of the Don River to draw and study animals as a way of avoiding his abusive father. He attended the Ontario College of Art in 1879, studying with John Colin Forbes, then won a scholarship in art to the Royal Academy in London, England in 1880. He went out into the field, sometimes accompanied by William "Willie" Brodie Jr., the son of the naturalist Dr. William Brodie. The death of Willie in a canoeing accident was a blow to Seton. In the 1890s, he studied at the Académie Julian in Paris In 1893–4, he was elected an associate member of the Royal Canadian Academy of Arts.

On Seton's 21st birthday his father presented him with an invoice for all of the expenses connected with his childhood and youth, including the fee charged by the doctor who delivered him. According to one writer, he paid the bill, but never spoke to his father again. In his autobiography, Trail of An Artist-naturalist: The Autobiography of Ernest Thompson Seton, he discusses the incident in detail, but, since he hadn't "a cent of money," he could not pay his father. He went immediately to work and used the money he made to leave the household.

In 1882, he joined his brother on a homestead outside Carberry, Manitoba, where he began to write. In 1891, he published The Birds of Manitoba and was appointed Provincial Naturalist by the government of Manitoba. He continued to publish books about Manitoba for decades to come, including The Life Histories of Northern Animals: An Account of the Mammals of Manitoba and lived in Manitoba, before moving to New York and Connecticut. In 1930, when he moved to Santa Fe, New Mexico.

He changed his name to Ernest Thompson Seton (after initially changing it to Ernest Seton-Thompson), believing that Seton had been an important family name. He became successful as a writer, artist, and naturalist, and moved to New York City to further his career. Seton later lived at Wyndygoul, an estate that he built in Cos Cob, a section of Greenwich, Connecticut. After experiencing vandalism by the local youth, Seton invited them to his estate for a weekend where he told them what he claimed were stories of the American Indians and of nature. Seton was an early and influential member of the Camp-Fire Club of America, hosting several of the club's earliest official events at his Wyndygoul estate.

He formed the Woodcraft Indians in 1902 and invited the local youth to join. Despite the name, the group was made up of non-native boys and girls. The stories became a series of articles written for the Ladies Home Journal, and were eventually collected in The Birch Bark Roll of the Woodcraft Indians in 1906. Shortly after, the Woodcraft Indians evolved into the Woodcraft Rangers, which was established as a non-profit organization for youth programming in 1922.

Since 1922, Woodcraft Rangers has served Los Angeles youth with Seton's model of character building, which encompasses service, truth, fortitude, and beauty. Since then, Woodcraft Rangers youth have been received in a safe environment to encourage the discovery of their own talents. Today the Woodcraft Rangers organization serves over 15,000 youth in the Los Angeles county by helping them find pathways to purposeful lives. They offer expanded learning opportunities to youth from kindergarten to twelfth grade. Youth participants are encouraged to discover their natural talents and are embraced daily with the belief that all children are innately good.

== Scouting ==
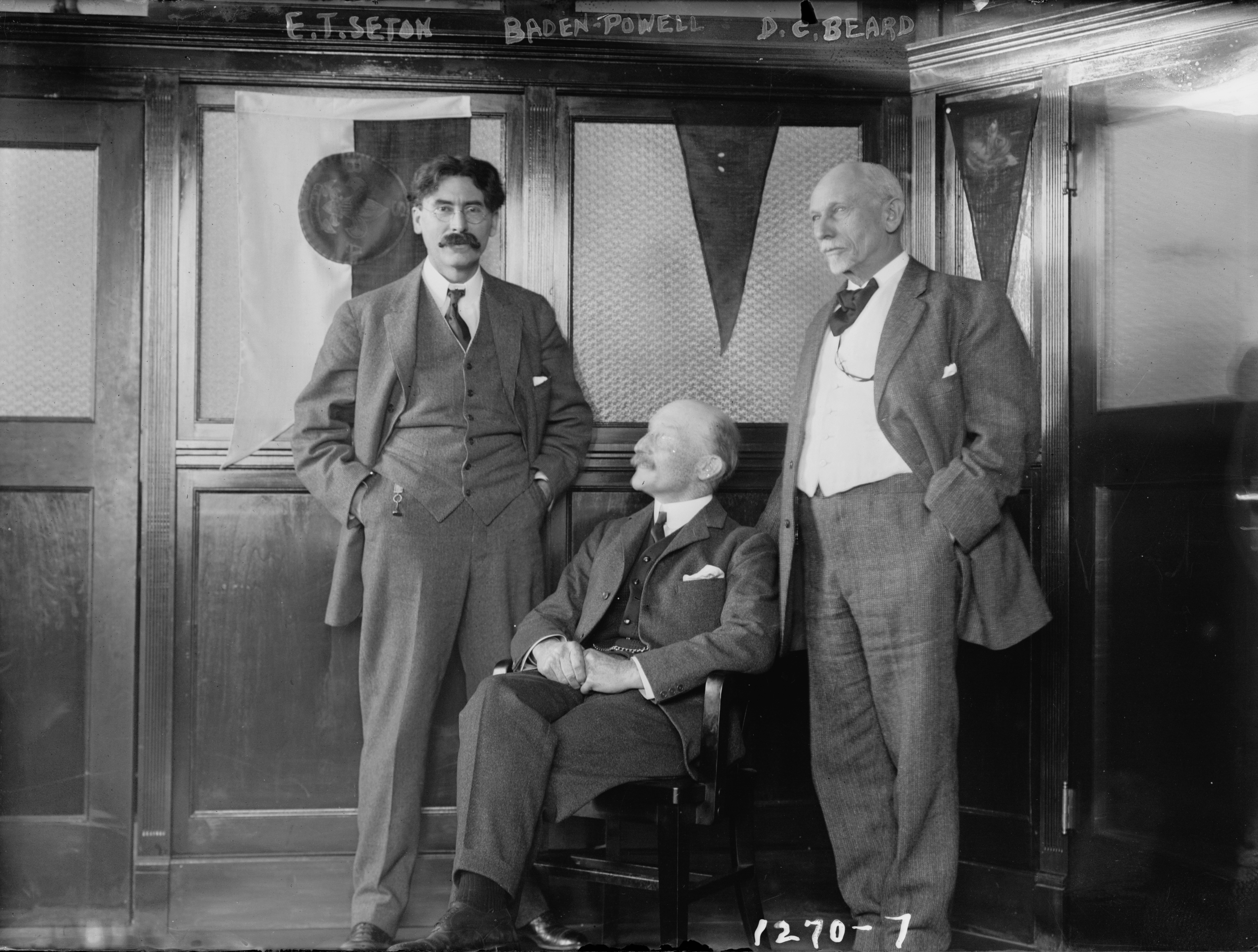
Ernest Thompson Seton with Baden-Powell (seated) and Daniel Beard (right)

Seton met Scouting's founder, Lord Baden-Powell, in 1906. Baden-Powell had read Seton's book The Birch Bark Roll of the Woodcraft Indians and was greatly intrigued by it. The pair met and shared ideas. Baden-Powell went on to found the Scouting movement worldwide and Seton became the president of the committee that founded the Boy Scouts of America (BSA) and was its first (and only) Chief Scout. Seton's Woodcraft Indians (a youth organization) combined with the early attempts at Scouting from the YMCA and other organizations and with Daniel Carter Beard's Sons of Daniel Boone, to form the BSA. The work of Seton and Beard is in large part the basis of the Traditional Scouting movement.

Seton served as Chief Scout of the BSA from 1910 to 1915 and incorporated what he believed to be American Indian elements into the traditions of the BSA. He had significant personality and philosophical clashes with Beard and James E. West. In August 1910, Seton organized and led the program at the BSA's first encampment at Silver Bay on Lake George in New York, where youth groups from across the country gathered under his direct supervision; a retrospective account described the first American scouts as organized "as an outgrowth of Seton's Indians." That same summer he visited Adirondack Camp for Boys, founded by Dr. Elias G. Brown, on Lake George.

In addition to disputes about the content of Seton's contributions to the Boy Scout Handbook, conflicts also arose about the suffragist activities of his wife, Grace Gallatin Seton Thompson, and his British citizenship. The citizenship issue arose partly because of his high position within the BSA and the federal charter West was attempting to obtain for the BSA requiring its board members to be United States citizens. Seton drafted his written resignation on January 29, 1915, but did not send it to the BSA until May. The position of Chief Scout was eliminated and the position "Chief Scout Executive" was taken on by James West. In 1931, Seton became a United States citizen.

== Personal life ==
British by birth, Seton was not naturalized as Canadian (as status did not legally exist until 1947; he thus remained a British subject) and became an American in 1931. He was married twice. His first marriage was to Grace Gallatin in 1896. Their only daughter, Ann (1904–1990), later known as Anya Seton, became a best-selling author of historical and biographical novels. According to Ann's introduction to the novel Green Darkness, Grace was a practicing Theosophist.

Ernest and Grace divorced in 1935, and Ernest soon married Julia Moss Buttree. Julia wrote works by herself and with Ernest. They did not have any biological children, but in the 1930s they sought to adopt Moss Buttree's niece, Leila Moss, who lived with them for years in New Mexico. In 1938, they adopted an infant daughter, Beulah (Dee) Seton (later Dee Seton Barber). Dee Seton Barber, a talented embroiderer of articles for synagogues such as Torah mantles, died in 2006.

Seton called his father, Joseph Logan Thompson, "the most selfish man I ever knew, or heard of, in history or in fiction." He cut off ties completely after being made to pay off an itemized list of all expenses he had cost his father, up to and including the doctor's fee for his delivery, a total of $537.50.

Seton's parents lived out their lives in Toronto, as did brother John Enoch Thompson (abt. 1846–1932).

Two brothers, Joseph Logan Thompson (1849–1922) and Charles Seton Thompson (1851–1925), moved to British Columbia. Besides Seton, George Seton Thompson (1854–1944) moved to Illinois and died there.

== Writing and later life ==
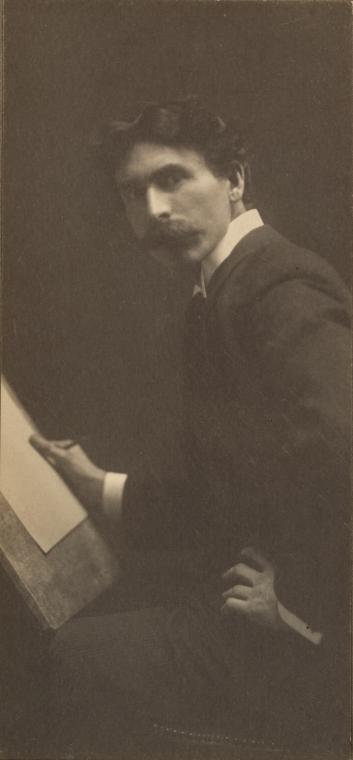
Seton early in his writing career

Seton was an early pioneer of the modern school of animal fiction writing, his most popular work being Wild Animals I Have Known (1898), which contains the story of his killing of the wolf Lobo. Four stories from this collection would be republished as Lobo, Rag, and Vixen (1900). He later became involved in a literary debate known as the nature fakers controversy, after John Burroughs published an article in 1903 in the Atlantic Monthly attacking writers of sentimental animal stories. The controversy lasted for four years and included important American environmental and political figures of the day, including President Theodore Roosevelt.

For his work, Lives of Game Animals Volume 4, Seton was awarded the Daniel Giraud Elliot Medal from the National Academy of Sciences in 1928. In 1931, he became a United States citizen. Seton was associated with the Santa Fe arts and literary community during the mid-1930s and early 1940s, which was a group of artists and authors, including author and artist Alfred Morang, sculptor and potter Clem Hull, painter Georgia O'Keeffe, painter Randall Davey, painter Raymond Jonson, leader of the Transcendental Painters Group and artist Eliseo Rodriguez. He was made a member of the Royal Canadian Academy of Arts.

In 1933, Seton purchased 100 acres (40 ha) in Santa Fe County, New Mexico, United States. Seton ran training camps for youth leaders and had a small publisher named Seton Village Press that closed in 1943 due to World War II. The tract eventually grew to 2,500 acres (1,000 ha). Seton Village was established as an unincorporated community.

Seton designed and built his castle as a 32-room, 6,900-square-foot (640 m^{2}) multi-level building with a flat-roof and rough hewn stone wall exterior. The interior had oak floors and plaster walls with the ceilings supported by log rafters. The castle was built on a hill at an elevation of 7,000 ft (2,100 m). It is designated a National Historic Landmark and a New Mexico State Cultural Property. The castle burned down while being restored in 2005. The Academy for the Love of Learning, which owns the property, has decided to preserve the castle ruins as a "contemplative garden".

== Death ==
He died in Seton Village, New Mexico, at the age of 86. Seton was cremated in Albuquerque, New Mexico. In 1960, in honor of his 100th birthday and the 350th anniversary of Santa Fe, his daughter, Dee and his grandson, Seton Cottier (son of Anya), scattered the ashes over Seton Village from an airplane.

== Legacy ==
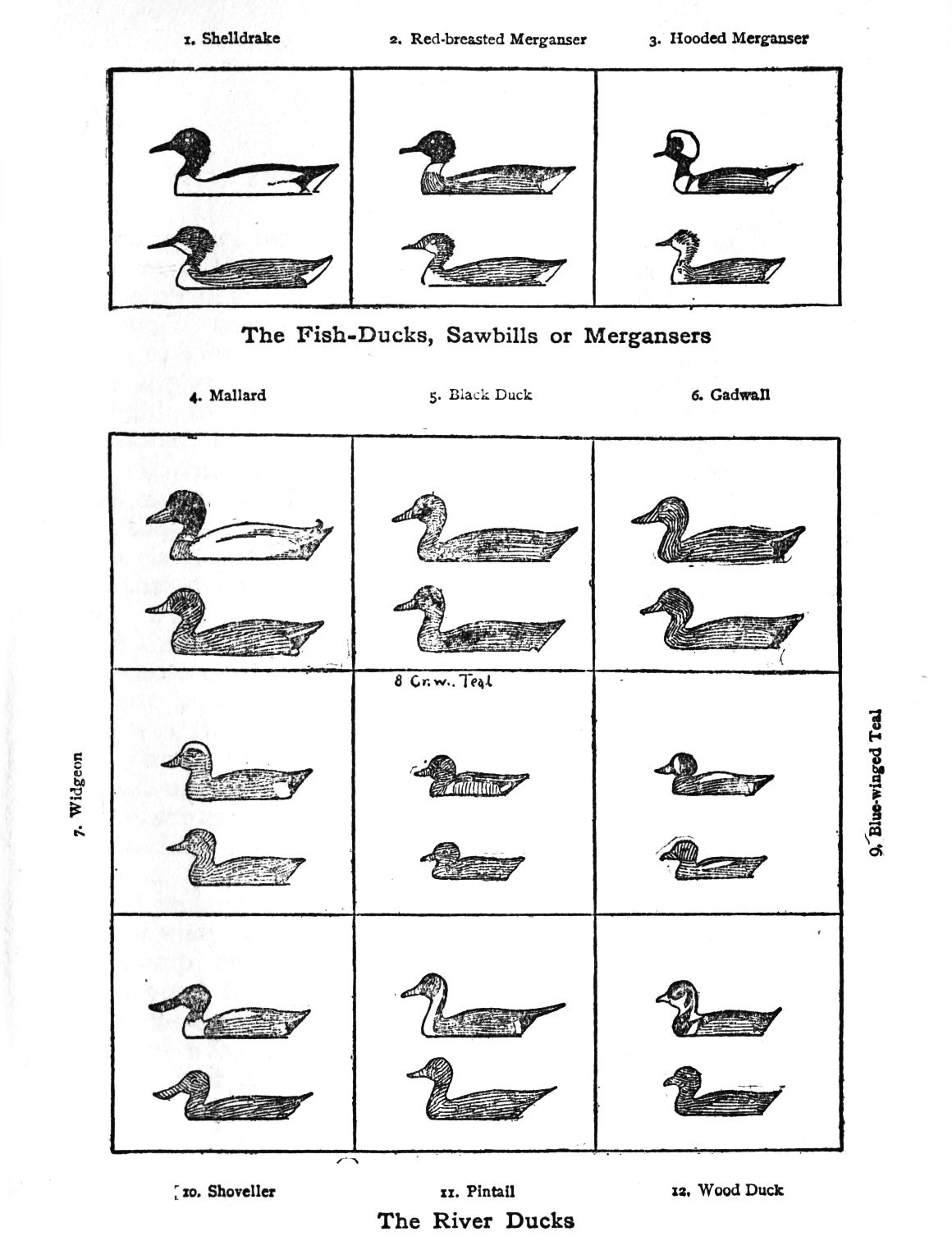
The diagrams of ducks inspired Roger Tory Peterson's idea for a field guide.

The Philmont Scout Ranch houses the Seton Memorial Library and Museum. Seton Castle in Santa Fe, built by Seton as his last residence, housed many of his other items. Seton Castle burned down in 2005 during an attempt at restoration, but all the artwork, manuscripts, books, etc., had been removed to storage before renovation was to have begun.

The Academy for the Love of Learning, an educational organization in Santa Fe, acquired Seton Castle and its contents in 2003. The new Academy Center that opened in 2011 includes a gallery and archives featuring artwork and other materials as part of its Seton Legacy Project. The Seton Legacy Project organized a major exhibition on Seton opening at the New Mexico History Museum on May 23, 2010, the catalog published as Ernest Thompson Seton: The Life and Legacy of an Artist and Conservationist by David L. Witt.

Roger Tory Peterson drew inspiration for his field guide from the simple diagram of ducks that Seton included in Two Little Savages.

Seton is honored by the Ernest Thompson Seton Scout Reservation in Greenwich, Connecticut, the Seton Centre in Carberry, Manitoba, and with the E.T. Seton Park in Toronto, Ontario. Obtained in the early 1960s as the site of the future Metro Toronto Zoo, the land was later used to establish parkland and home to the Ontario Science Centre. A plaque is found on the front wall of 6 Aberdeen Avenue in Toronto, where Seton had lived as a child.

=== In pop culture ===
==== In television ====
Monarch: The Big Bear of Tallac (Japanese: シートン動物記 くまの子ジャッキー, Seton Doubutsuki: Kuma no Ko Jacky) was a 26-episode anime television series based on Seton's novel of the same name, and was first broadcast in 1977.

In 1979, a 26-episode anime series based on Seton's 1922 book Bannertail: The Story of a Gray Squirrel was produced in Japan by Nippon Animation, called Bannertail: The Story of Gray Squirrel (シートン動物記 りすのバナー, Shīton Dōbutsuki Risu no Banā).

In 1989–1990, Eiken released Seton Dōbutsuki (シートン動物記, 'Seton Animal Chronicles'), a 45-episode anime TV series adapted from the manga Seton's Wild Animals (シートン動物記), depicting the different literary works of Seton, including his 1898 Wild Animals I Have Known. "Lobo, the King of Currumpaw" (episodes 17 and 18) was a notable episode of the show which many viewers later learned of when the storyline was plotted into a popular 2009 TV documentary entitled The Wolf That Changed America. The cartoon was dubbed in German and Arabic and saw an emerging popularity among Arabs in the early 1990s as Mokhles Sadik ul Hayawaan (Arabic: مخلص صديق الحيوان, 'Mokhles, Animals' Friend').

"Chink, the Development of a Pup" was adapted into a cartoon in Russian in 1992.

In October 2015, the Comedy Central show Drunk History gave a short, drunk history lesson by Mike Still (season 3, episode 10, second act) in which Seton is portrayed by Colin Hanks. It mostly concentrates on the story of Lobo, but also mentions the roots of the Boy Scouts and helping out troubled teens.

==== In literature and manga ====
The five-volume manga Seton's Wild Animals (シートン動物記) by Sanpei Shirato, published between 1961 and 1965, portrayed the various literary works of Seton. Kenji Uchiyama translated Seton's work for the manga from English into Japanese.

In 1988, Yury Iosifovich Koval published a short novel called Шамайка (Shamayka), a retelling of The Slum Cat.

In a 1993 issue of the Japanese manga Diamond is Unbreakable, the character Jotaro Kujo references Seton's quote "there is no animal that cannot be tracked".

Several of Seton's works are written from the perspective of a predator and were an influence upon Robert T. Bakker's Raptor Red (1995).

From 2004 to 2006, manga artist Jiro Taniguchi and scenarist Yoshiharu Imaizumi published Shīton (Japanese: シートン), a four-volume manga romanticizing the life of Seton. These manga were not translated into English, but appeared in French, Italian and Spanish. The French titles are:

1. Lobo, le Roi des Loups ('Lobo, King of Wolves')
2. Le jeune garçon et le lynx ('The Young boy and the Lynx')
3. Sandhill Stag ('Sandhill Stag')
4. Monarch, l'ours du mont Tallac (Monarch, Mount Tallac Bear)

Seton's appearance inspired the design of the character Shiton Anehata, a scholar and zoophile who is one of the Abashiri convicts in the manga Golden Kamui.

Seton is also mentioned in Philip Roth's 2010 novel, Nemesis, where he is credited for having introduced Indian lore to the American camping movement.

== Works ==
Drawing from Wild Animals I Have Known, Scribner's (1898)

Drawing from Two Little Savages, Doubleday (1903)

Drawing from The Book of Woodcraft and Indian Lore, Doubleday (1912)

Page from Sign Talk of the Indians, Doubleday (1918)

- Mammals of Manitoba (1886)
- Birds of Manitoba, Foster (1891)
- How to Catch Wolves (1894)
- Studies in the Art Anatomy of Animals (1896)
- Wild Animals I Have Known (1898)
  - "Lobo the King of Currumpaw"
- The Trail of the Sandhill Stag (1899)
- Lobo, Rag, & Vixen (1900)
- The Wild Animal Play for Children (musical) (1900)
- The Biography of a Grizzly (1900)
- Tito: The Story of the Coyote That Learned How (1900)
- Bird Portraits (1901)
- Lives of the Hunted (1901)
- Twelve Pictures of Wild Animals (1901)
- Krag and Johnny Bear (1902)
- How to Play Indian (1903)
- Two Little Savages (1903)
- How to Make a Real Indian Teepee (1903)
- How Boys Can Form a Band of Indians (1903)
- The Red Book (1904)
- Monarch, the Big Bear of Tallac (1904)
- Woodmyth & Fable (1905)
- Animal Heroes (1905)
- The Birchbark Roll of the Woodcraft Indians (1906)
- The Natural History of the Ten Commandments (1907)
- Fauna of Manitoba, British Assoc. Handbook (1909)
- Biography of a Silver Fox (1909)
- Life-Histories of Northern Animals (two volumes) (1909)
- Boy Scouts of America: Official Handbook, with General Sir Robert Baden-Powell (1910)
- The Forester's Manual (1910)
- The Arctic Prairies (1911)
- Rolf in the Woods (1911)
- The Book of Woodcraft and Indian Lore (1912)
- The Red Lodge (1912)
- Wild Animals at Home (1913)
- The Slum Cat (1915)
- Legend of the White Reindeer (1915)
- The Manual of the Woodcraft Indians (1915)
- Wild Animal Ways (1916)
- Woodcraft Manual for Girls (1916)
- The Preacher of Cedar Mountain (1917)
- Woodcraft Manual for Boys; the Sixteenth Birch Bark Roll (1917)
- The Woodcraft Manual for Boys; the Seventeenth Birch Bark Roll (1918)
- The Woodcraft Manual for Girls; the Eighteenth Birch Bark Roll (1918)
- Sign Talk of the Indians (1918)
- The Laws and Honors of the Little Lodge of Woodcraft (1919)
- The Brownie Wigwam: The Rules of the Brownies (1921)
- The Buffalo Wind (1921)
- Woodland Tales (1921)
- The Book of Woodcraft (1921)
- The Book of Woodcraft and Indian Lore (1922)
- Bannertail: The Story of a Gray Squirrel (1922)
- Manual of the Brownies, 6th edition (1922)
- The Ten Commandments in the Animal World (1923)
- Animals (1926)
- Animals Worth Knowing (1928)
- Lives of Game Animals (four volumes) (1925–1928)
- Blazes on the Trail (1928)
- Krag, the Kootenay Ram and Other Stories (1929)
- Billy the Dog That Made Good (1930)
- Cute Coyote and Other Stories (1930)
- Lobo, Bingo, The Pacing Mustang (1930)
- Famous Animal Stories (1932)
- Animals Worth Knowing (1934)
- Johnny Bear, Lobo and Other Stories (1935)
- The Gospel of the Redman, with Julia M. Seton
- Biography of An Arctic Fox (1937)
- Great Historic Animals (1937)
- Mainly about Wolves (1937)
- Pictographs of the Old Southwest (1937)
- Buffalo Wind (1938)
- Trail and Camp-Fire Stories (1940)
- Trail of an Artist-Naturalist: The Autobiography of Ernest Thompson Seton (1940)
- Santanna, the Hero Dog of France (1945)
- The Best of Ernest Thompson Seton (1949)
- Ernest Thompson Seton's America (1954)
- Animal Tracks and Hunter Signs (1958)
- The Worlds of Ernest Thompson Seton (1976)

== Archives ==
There is an Ernest Thompson Seton fonds at Library and Archives Canada. It is archival reference number R7616 and former archival reference number MG29-D108. The fonds consists of 6.2 metres of textual records, 1,220 photographs, 118 drawings, and other media.

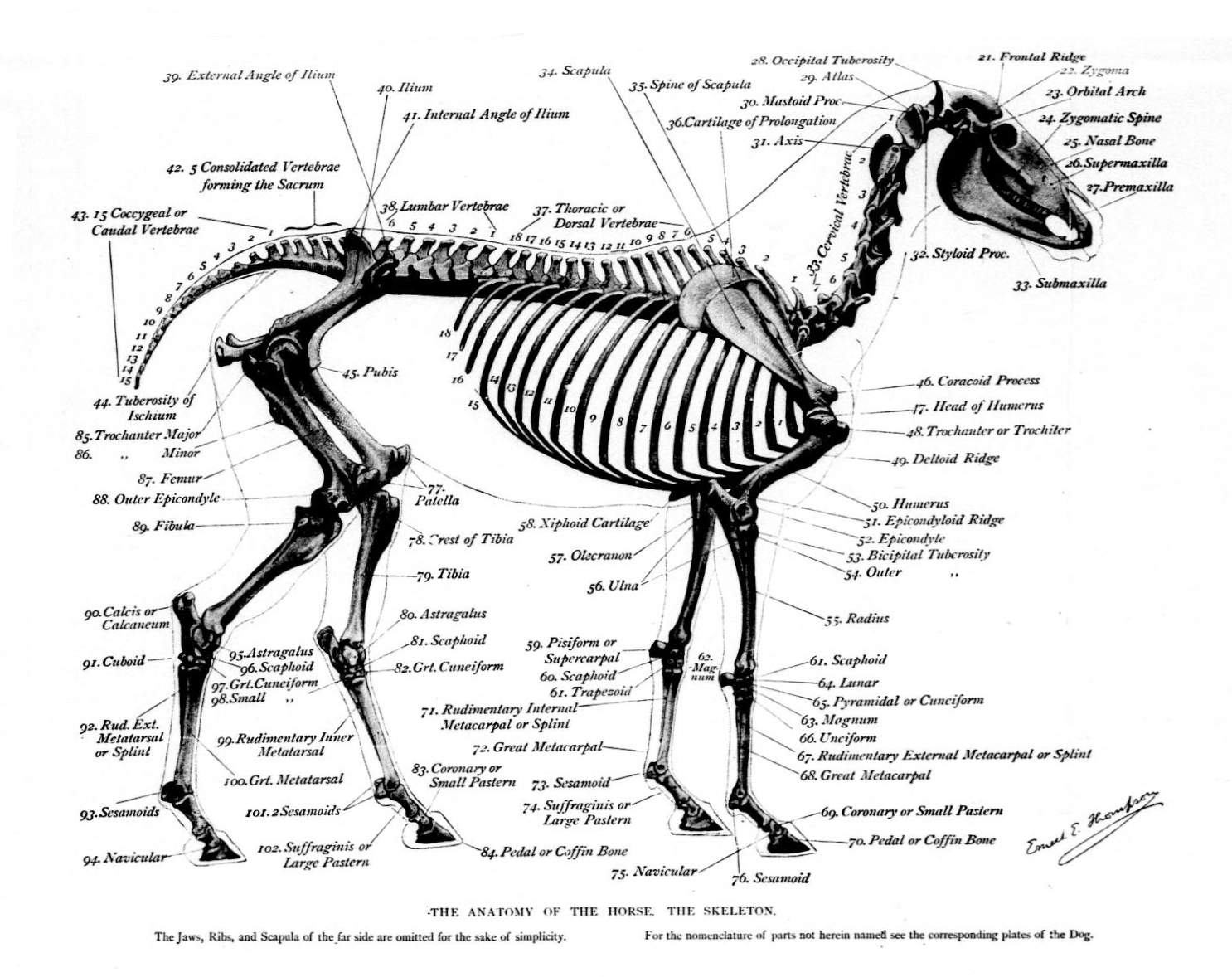

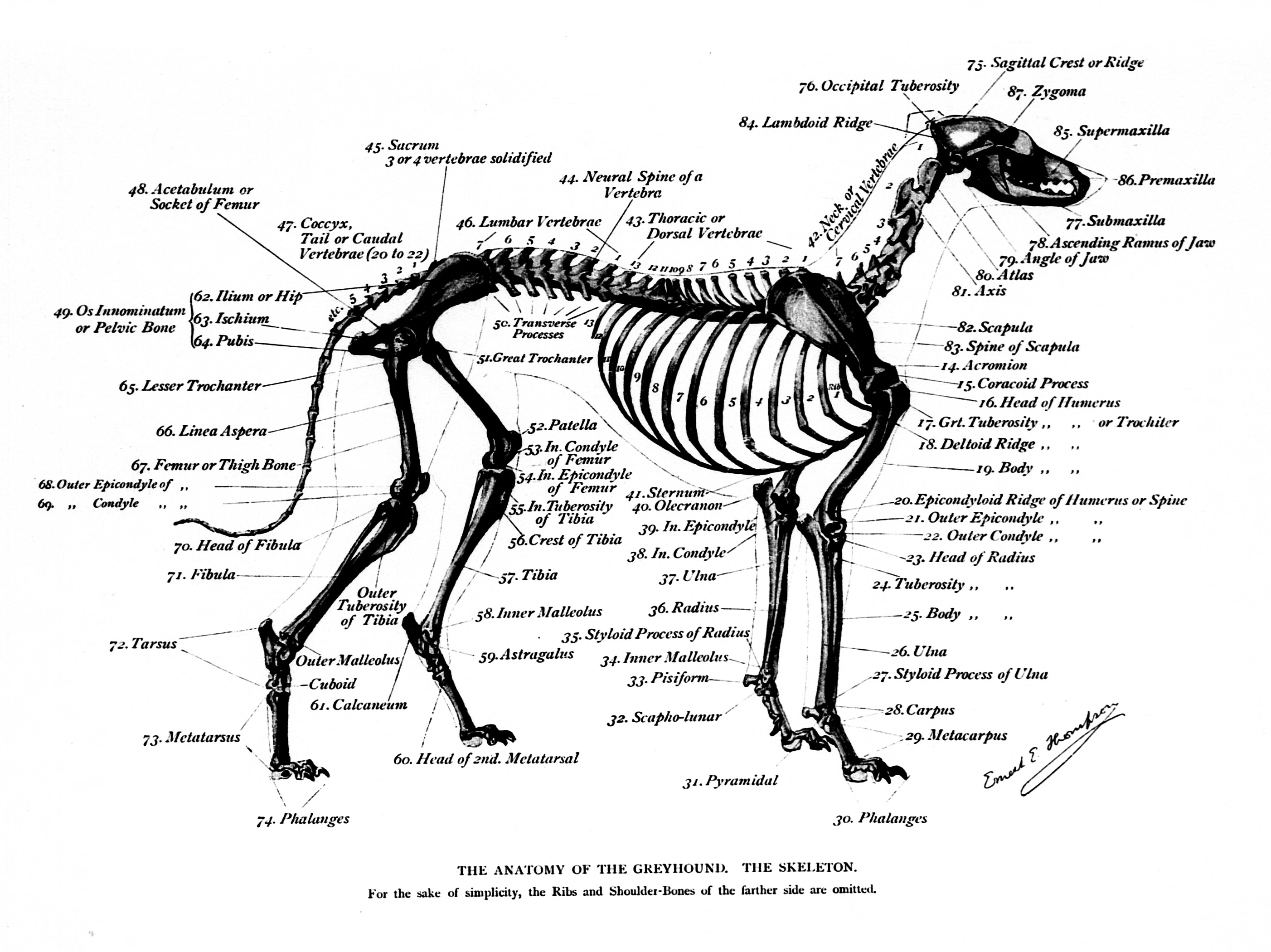

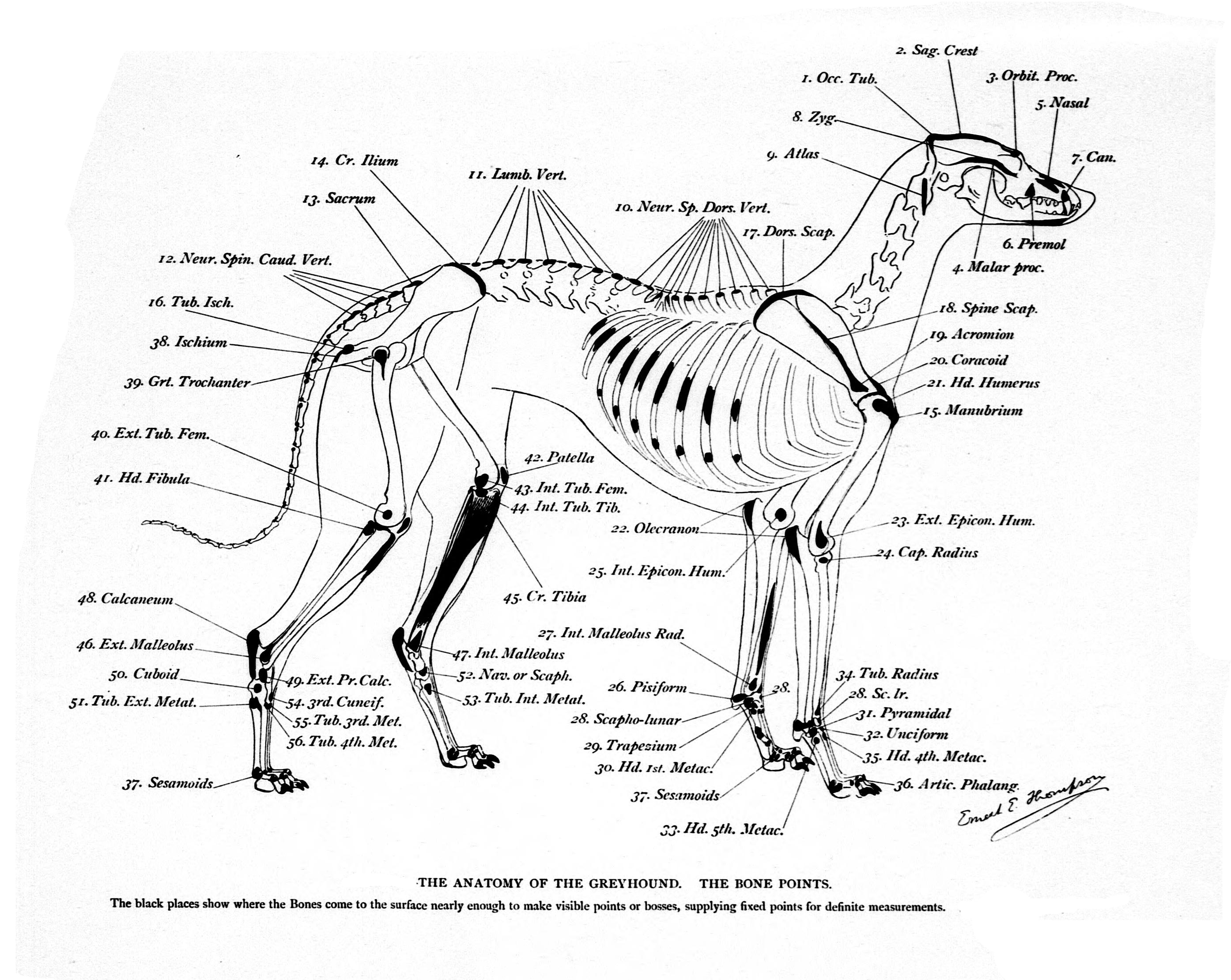

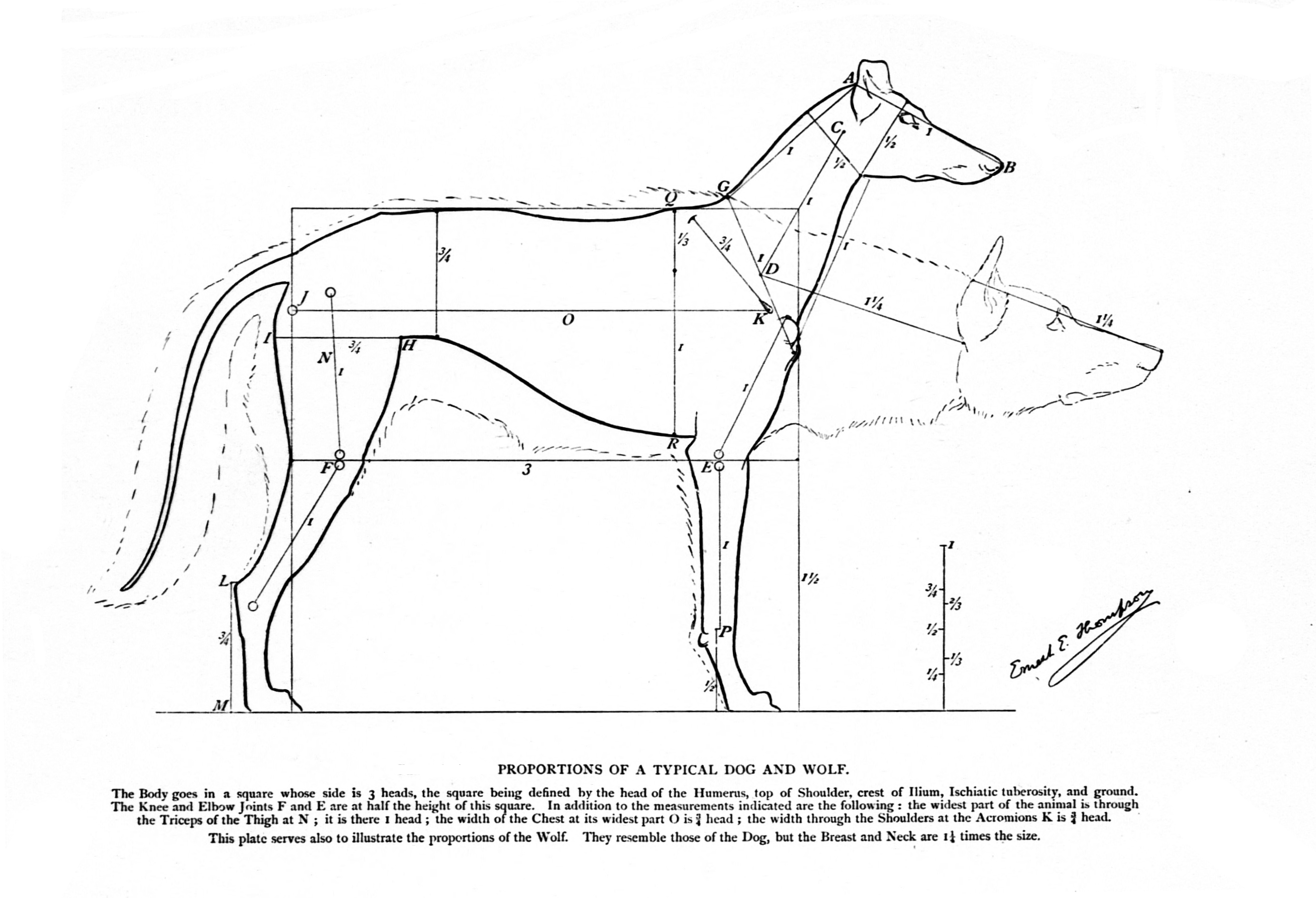

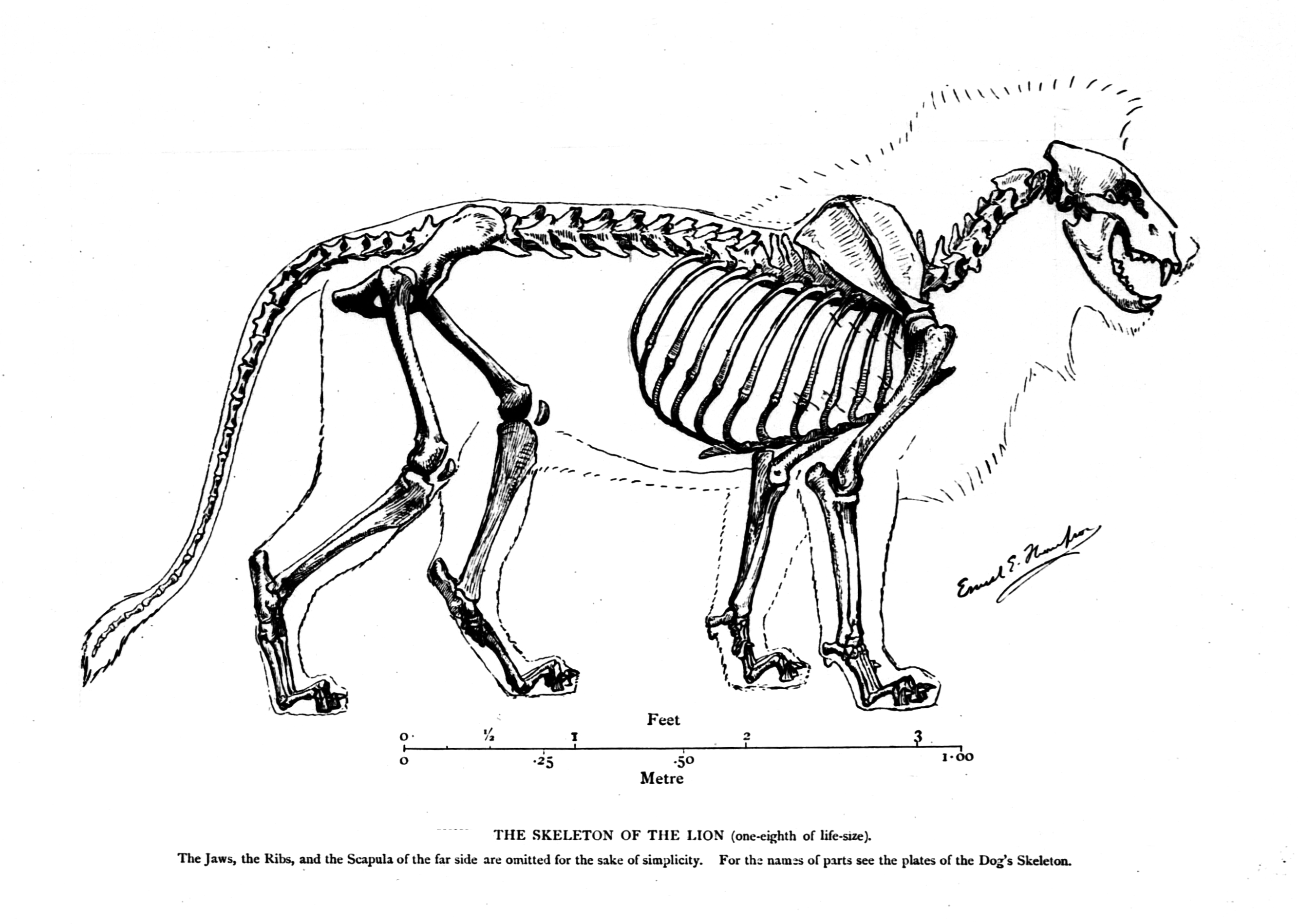

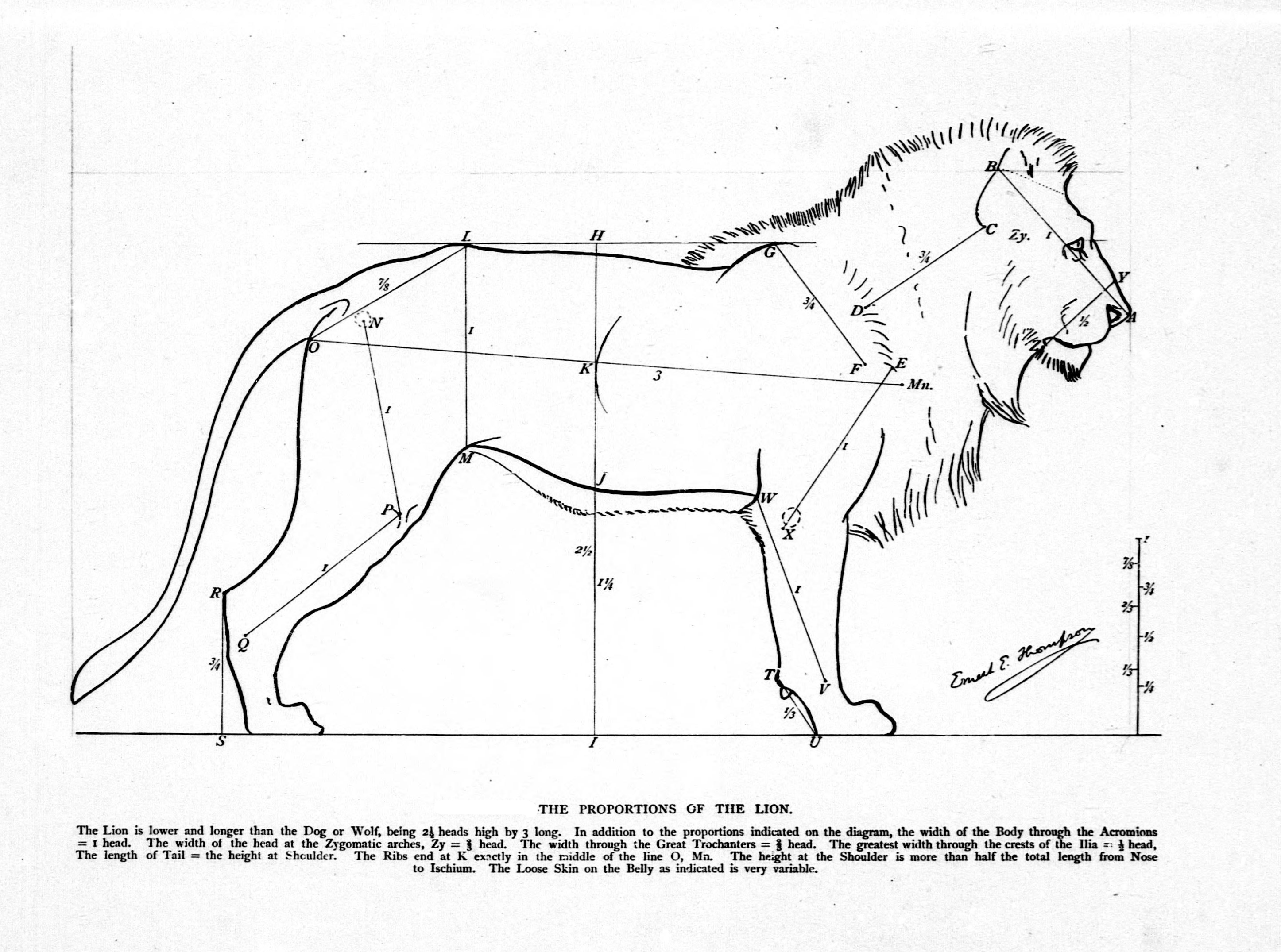

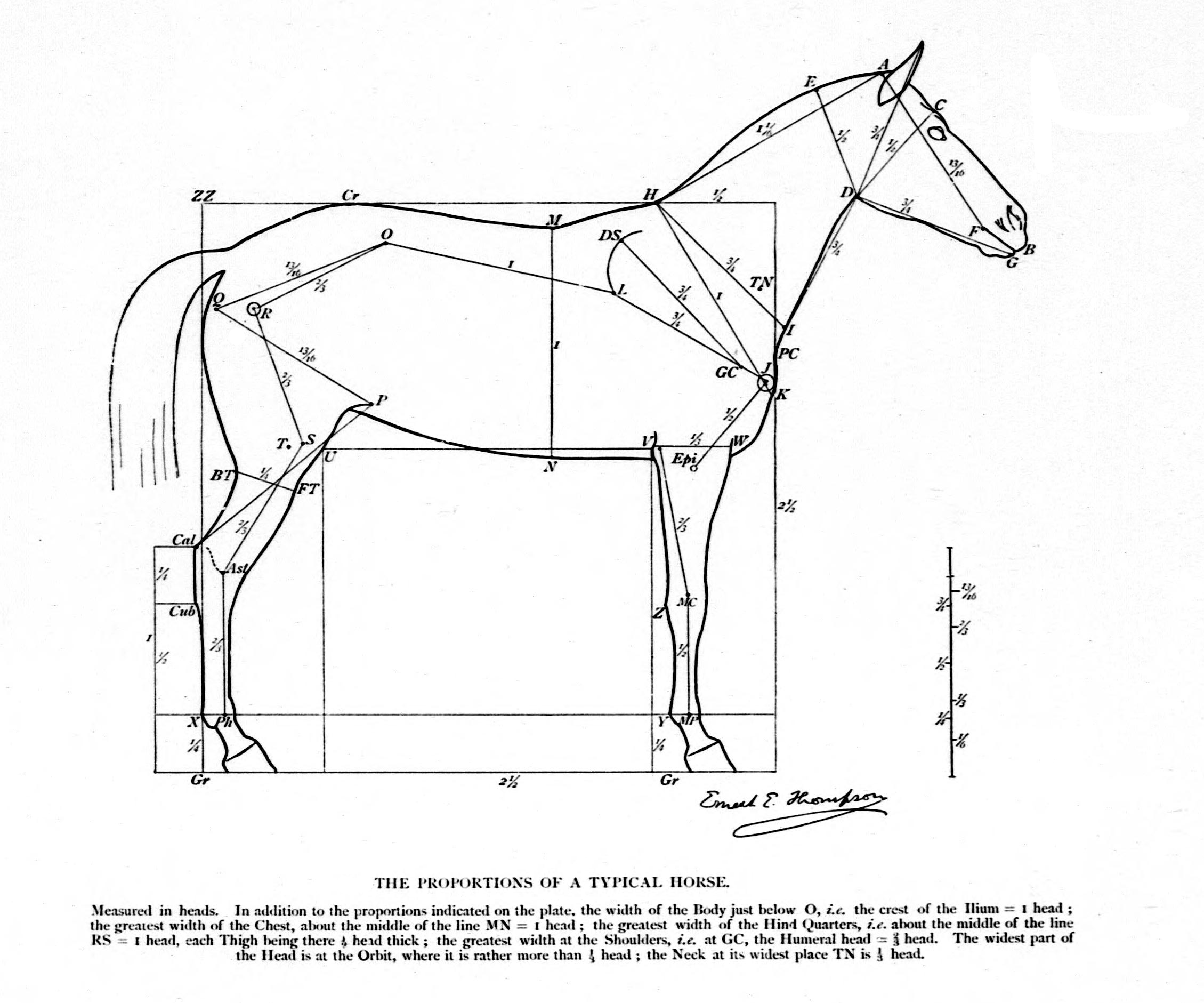

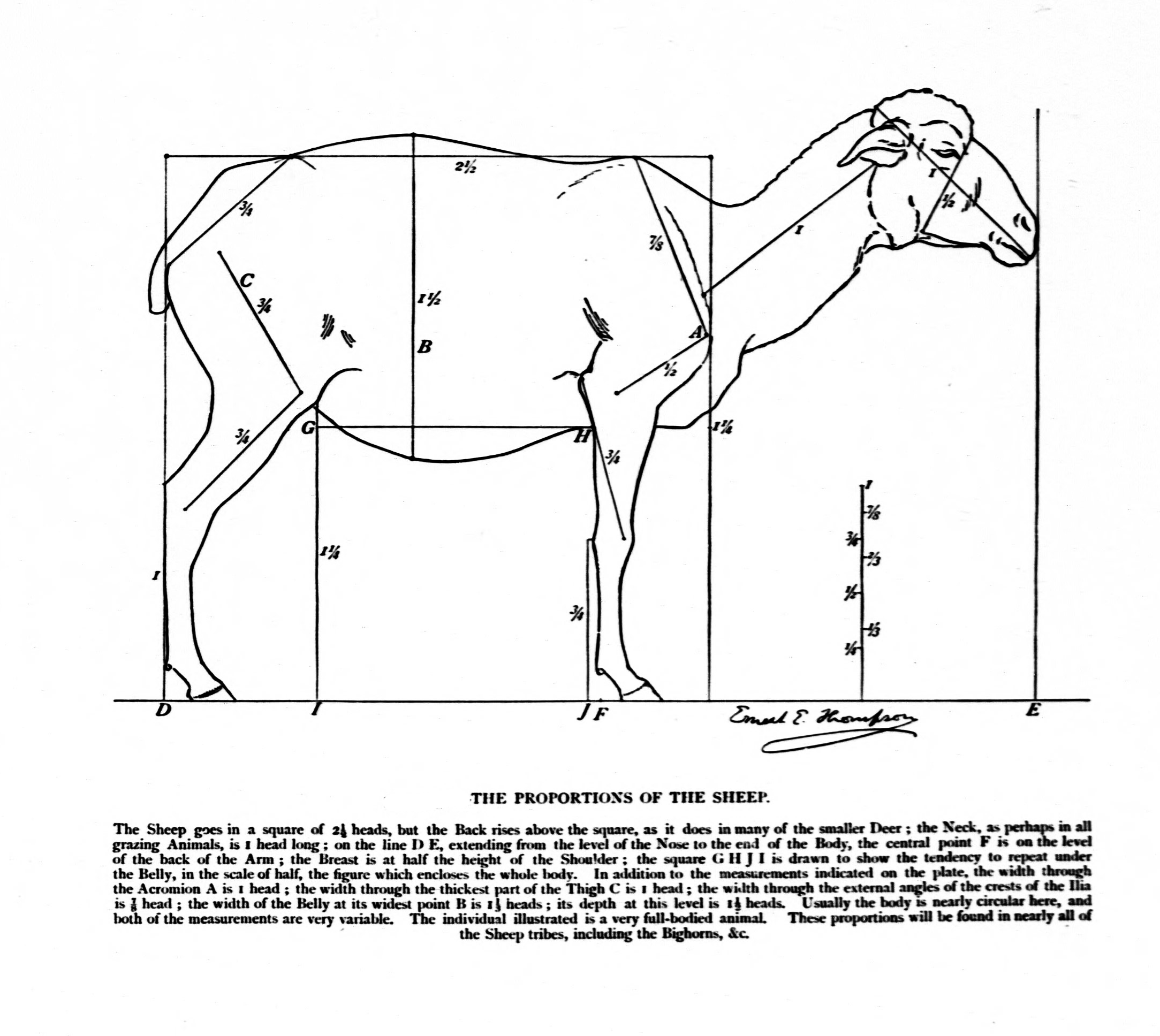

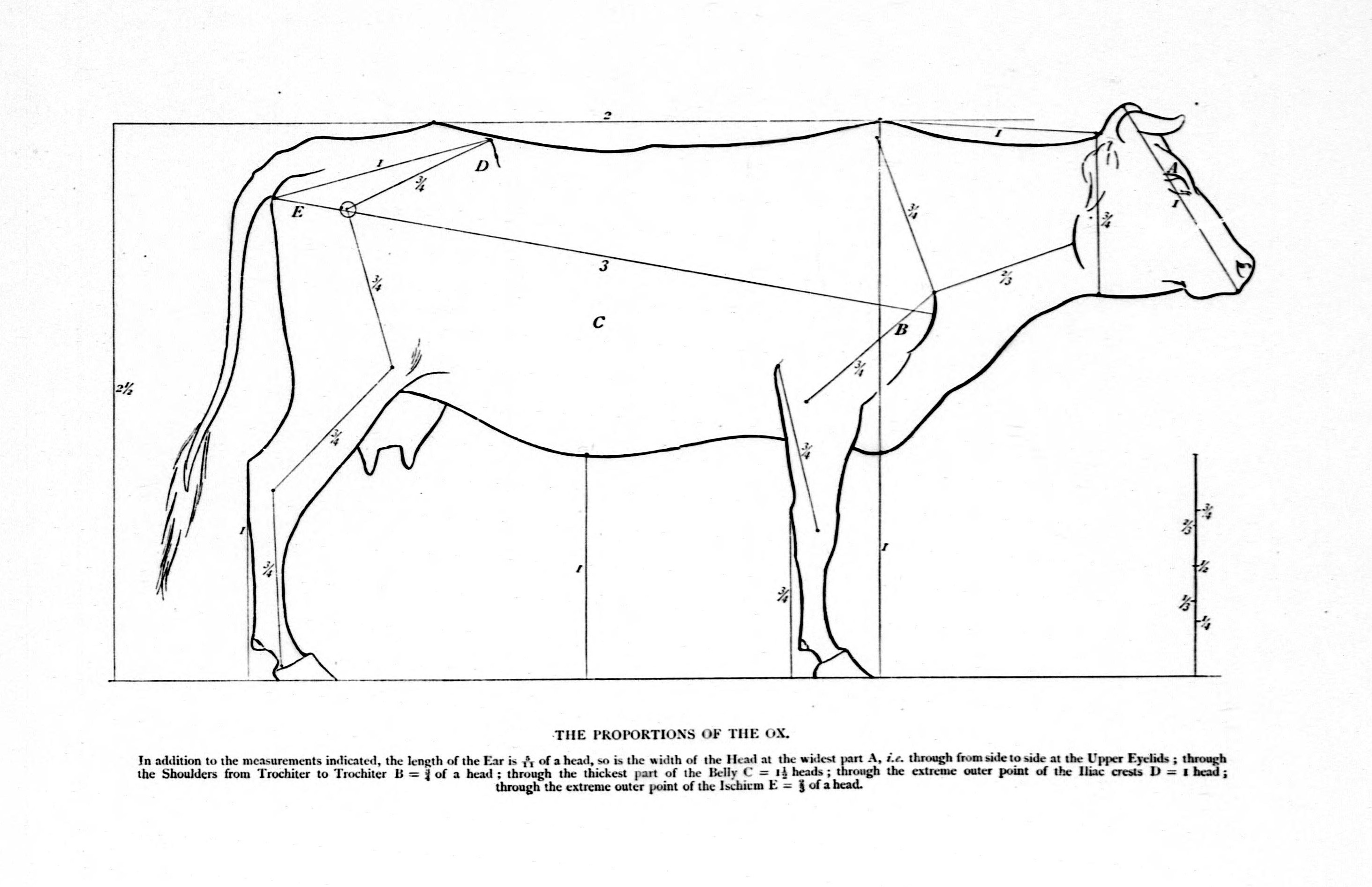

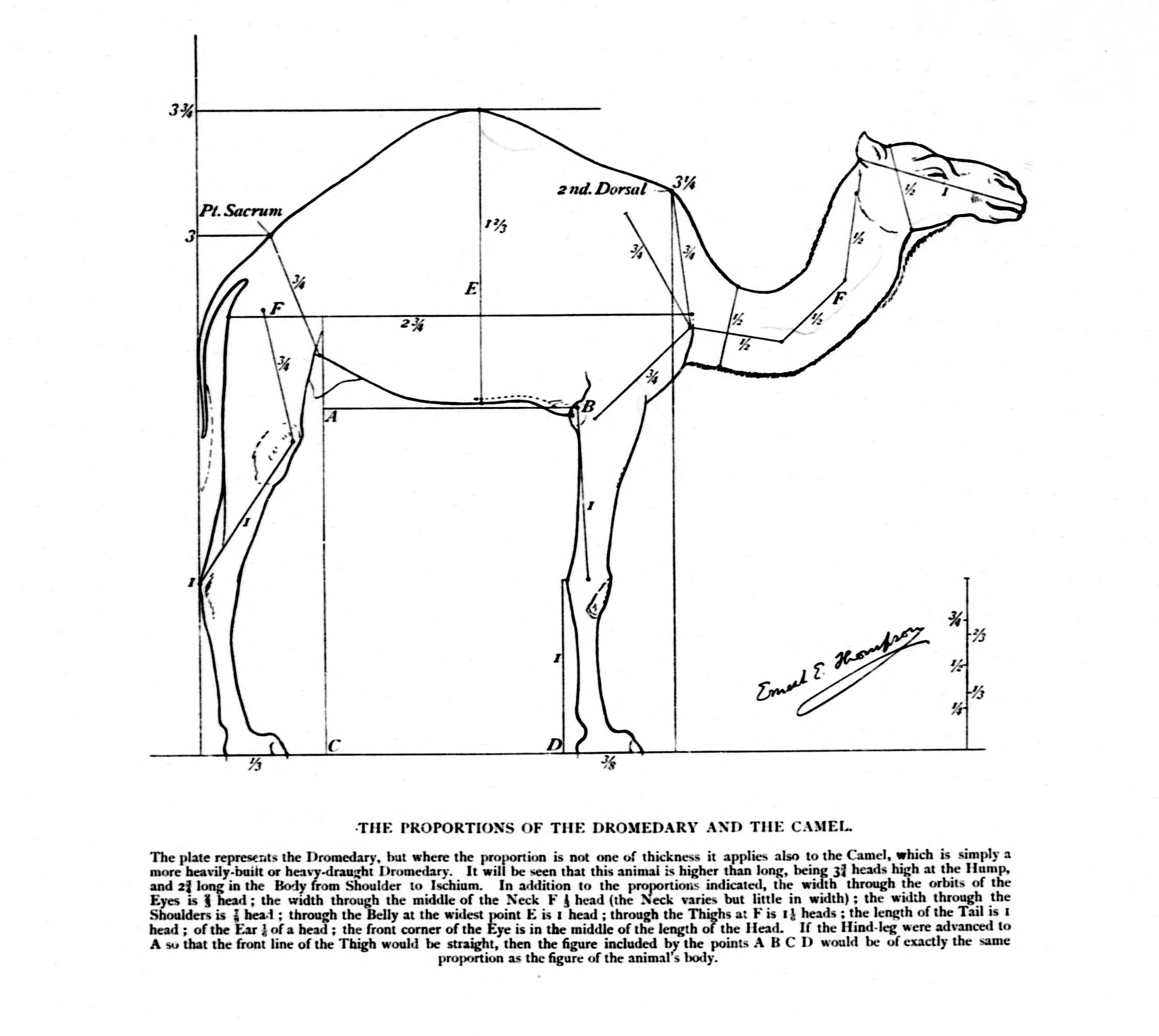

== See also ==
- Kibbo Kift
- Lobo the King of Currumpaw
- Philmont Scout Ranch
- Roving Outdoor Conservation School (ROCS)
- Scouting memorials
- Seton's Wild Animals, a Japanese manga adaptation of some of Seton's works by Sanpei Shirato
