= Academy for the Love of Learning =

Coordinates: 35°35′59″N 105°55′49″W

The Academy for the Love of Learning is a non-profit organization conceived by American composers Leonard Bernstein and Aaron Stern. The Academy was incorporated as a 501(c)3 in 1998. Its campus is located in southeast Santa Fe, NM, on the former estate of Ernest Thompson Seton. Through its programming and research, the Academy seeks to "awaken, enliven, nurture and sustain the natural love of learning in people of all ages."

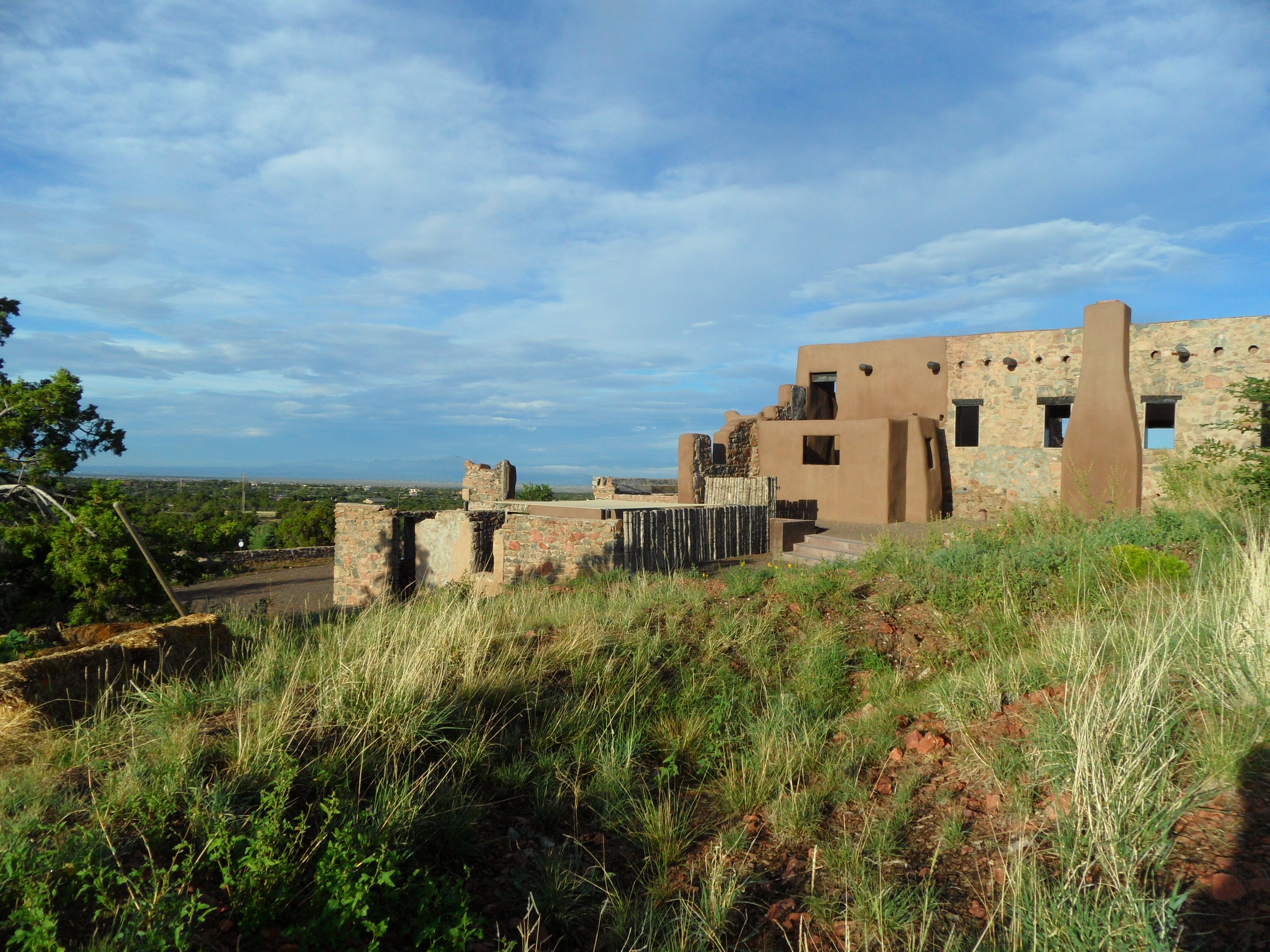

== History ==
After meeting in 1971, Bernstein and Stern began envisioning an institute that would study and promote people's natural love of learning. The Academy incorporated as a 501(c)3 organization in 1998, eight years after Bernstein's death.

== Campus ==
In 2003, The Academy purchased the estate of Ernest Thompson Seton, a pioneer in wildlife conservation and nature-based youth education. It began renovation of his former home, known as Seton Castle, in Seton Village. On November 15, 2005, while still under renovation, the building was destroyed by fire. The Academy subsequently designed and built a new campus that "takes a stand for a more respectful relationship with nature" and "a commitment that grows out of our own learning methodology, which calls for a heightened awareness of our impact on everything that surrounds us,” according to Academy founder Aaron Stern. The campus was completed in 2011. The City of Santa Fe declared it a 2012 Sustainable Santa Fe award winner for its water harvesting system. In May, 2013, the Academy was awarded Gold level LEED Certification from the U.S. Green Building Council.

== Approach ==
Bernstein and Stern shared a vision of "the activation of a culture of learning" in schools, leadership positions, and organizations and businesses. Programs include a professional development course for teachers called Teacher Renewal, leadership development, and a community arts program called El Otro Lado.
